= 1125 in Ireland =

- Centuries: 11th; 12th; 13th; 14th
- Decades: 1100s; 1110s; 1120s; 1130s; 1140s
- See also: Other events of 1125; List of years in Ireland

Events from the year 1125 in Ireland.

== Incumbents ==
- High King: Toirdelbach Ua Conchobair

== Events ==
- On 5 January 1125, the roof of the great stone church at Armagh was raised, having been without a complete roof for 130 years; the work was overseen by Ceallach, successor of Patrick.

== Deaths ==
- Cineidigh Ua Conaing, archinneach of Cill-Dalua
- Mac Maeilesuthain, Chief Lector
