= 1133 in Ireland =

- Centuries: 11th; 12th; 13th; 14th
- Decades: 1110s; 1120s; 1130s; 1140s; 1150s
- See also: Other events of 1133; List of years in Ireland

Events from the year 1133 in Ireland.

== Incumbents ==
- High King: Toirdelbach Ua Conchobair

== Events ==
- A major epidemic affecting cattle occurred, called maelgarbh (“cow mortality”), described as unprecedented since an earlier great mortality of cattle.
- A raid on Ardbraccan occurred in this year.

== Deaths ==
- Flaithbheartach Ua Flaithbheartaigh, killed by the son of Lochlainn Ua Lochlainn.
