= 1120 in Ireland =

- Centuries: 11th; 12th; 13th; 14th
- Decades: 1100s; 1110s; 1120s; 1130s; 1140s
- See also: Other events of 1120; List of years in Ireland

Events from the year 1120 in Ireland.

== Incumbents ==
- High King: Toirdelbach Ua Conchobair

== Events ==
- Toirdelbach Ua Conchobair succeeds Domnall Ua Lochlainn as High King.
- English King Henry I imposed trade embargoes on Ireland, affecting figures such as Arnulf de Montgomery.

== Deaths ==
- Branan, son of Gillachrist, chief of Corcachlann.
- Eachmarcach Mac Uidhrin, chief of Cinel-Fearadhaigh
