= 1107 in Ireland =

- Centuries: 11th; 12th; 13th; 14th
- Decades: 1100s; 1110s; 1120s
- See also: Other events of 1107; List of years in Ireland

The following is a list of events from the year 1107 in Ireland.

== Incumbents ==
- High King of Ireland: Domnall Ua Lochlainn

== Events ==
- A battle was fought between the people of the east and west of the Teathbha, in which Cinaedh (lord of Calraighe), along with others, were slain by Domhnall Mac Fiacla.
- Muirchertach Ua Briain further consolidated his authority over Meath and neighboring kingdoms.

== Deaths ==
- Cuilen Ua Cathalan, lord of Uaithne-Cliach
