= 1109 in Ireland =

- Centuries: 11th; 12th; 13th; 14th
- Decades: 1100s; 1110s; 1120s
- See also: Other events of 1109; List of years in Ireland

The following is a list of events from the year 1109 in Ireland.

== Incumbents ==
- High King of Ireland: Domnall Ua Lochlainn

== Events ==
- An army was led by the High King, with the people of Northern Ireland, to Sliabh. However, Ceallach, successor of Patrick, made a year's peace between Mac Lochlainn and Ua Briain; after which the people with the Cinel-Conaill and Cinel-Eoghain, proceeded to attack the Ulidians; who in turn gave them the three hostages which they themselves selected.
- Fighting is recorded among Leinster dynasties, involving the Uí Cheinnselaig rival Leinster factions. These conflicts are recorded as violent clashes.

== Deaths ==
- Maelisa Ua Cuillen, noble bishop of Northern Ireland
