= 1108 in Ireland =

- Centuries: 11th; 12th; 13th; 14th
- Decades: 1100s; 1110s; 1120s
- See also: Other events of 1108; List of years in Ireland

The following is a list of events from the year 1108 in Ireland.

== Incumbents ==
- High King of Ireland: Domnall Ua Lochlainn

== Events ==
- A substantial amount of Luimneach (Limerick) was burned on the night of the festival of Patrick.
- Muirchertach Ua Briain, King of Munster (and de facto High King), made a major military campaign into Mide (Meath) in 1108.

== Deaths ==
- Donnchad Ua Maeleachlainn a kingsman from the midlands, killed by an Ua Ruairc and others during the hostilities involving Ua Briain’s campaign.
