= 1100 in Ireland =

- Centuries: 11th; 12th; 13th
- Decades: 1100s; 1110s; 1120s
- See also: Other events of 1100; List of years in Ireland

Events from the year 1100 in Ireland.

== Incumbents ==
- Gilla na Naomh Ua hEidhin, King of Uí Fiachrach Aidhne, 1048–1100
- Aodh Ua hEidhin, King of Uí Fiachrach Aidhne, 1100–1121

== Deaths ==
- Gilla na Naomh Ua hEidhin, King of Uí Fiachrach Aidhne
