= 1140 in Ireland =

- Centuries: 11th; 12th; 13th; 14th
- Decades: 1120s; 1130s; 1140s; 1150s; 1160s
- See also: Other events of 1140; List of years in Ireland

Events from the year 1140 in Ireland.

== Incumbents ==
- High King: Toirdelbach Ua Conchobair

== Events ==
- A descendant of Patrick made a visitation to Connaught for the first time, and was praised.
- A battle was fought by the foreigners of Ath-cliath, over the foreigners of Port-Lairge, in which the son of Mac Tormair was slain.

== Deaths ==
- Domhnall Ua Sealbhaigh, airchinneach of Corcach
- Raghnall, grandson of Dubhdara, chief of Muintir‑Eolais (killed in conflict).
