= 1141 in Ireland =

- Centuries: 11th; 12th; 13th; 14th
- Decades: 1120s; 1130s; 1140s; 1150s; 1160s
- See also: Other events of 1141; List of years in Ireland

Events from the year 1141 in Ireland.

== Incumbents ==
- High King: Toirdelbach Ua Conchobair

== Events ==
- Conchobar Ua Briain, a member of the powerful Uí Briain dynasty, gained the kingship of Dublin. He died the following year.
- An army was led by Toirdhealbhach Ua Conchobhair into Fotharta-Airbhreach, where he plundered some of the men of Meath and of the Fothart.

== Deaths ==
- Domhnall, lord of Feara-Ceall, was killed by Muintir-Luainimh, at Rathain.
- Aedh Ua Longain, steward of Munster.
