= 1118 in Ireland =

- Centuries: 11th; 12th; 13th; 14th
- Decades: 1100s; 1110s; 1120s; 1130s
- See also: Other events of 1118; List of years in Ireland

Events from the year 1118 in Ireland.

== Incumbents ==
- High King of Ireland: Domnall Ua Lochlainn

== Events ==
- Synod of Ráth Breasail
- Enna mac Donnchada mac Murchada becomes King of Dublin.
- Cu Faifne mac Congalaig becomes King of Uí Failghe.
- Maelsechlainn Ua Faelain becomes King of the Déisi Muman.

== Deaths ==
- Diarmait Ua Briain, King of Munster.
- Rogan mac Domnaill meic Conchobair, King of Uí Failghe.
