= 1117 in Ireland =

- Centuries: 11th; 12th; 13th; 14th
- Decades: 1100s; 1110s; 1120s; 1130s
- See also: Other events of 1117; List of years in Ireland

Events from the year 1117 in Ireland.

== Incumbents ==
- High King of Ireland: Domnall Ua Lochlainn

== Deaths ==
- Diarmait mac Énna meic Murchada ruler of the kingdoms of Leinster and Dublin.
- Máel Muire Ua Dunáin, head of the clergy of Ireland.
