= 1101 in Ireland =

- Centuries: 11th; 12th; 13th; 14th
- Decades: 1100s; 1110s; 1120s
- See also: Other events of 1101; List of years in Ireland

Events from the year 1101 in Ireland.

== Incumbents ==
- High King of Ireland: Domnall Ua Lochlainn

== Events ==
- Muirchertach Ua Briain of the Dál gCais proclaims himself High King of Ireland.
- At the Synod of Cashel, Muirchertach Ua Briain grants Cashel to the church as the seat of a metropolitan bishop.
- Muirchertach Ua Briain destroys the ringfort at Grianan of Aileach.
- Sailors from overseas raid Scattery Island.
- Gillafin mac Coulahan, King of Síol Anmchadha, is killed and succeeded by his predecessor's son, Diarmaid Ua Madadhan.

== Deaths ==
- Gilla na Naemh Ua Dunabhra, Chief Poet of Connacht.
