= 1115 in Ireland =

- Centuries: 11th; 12th; 13th; 14th
- Decades: 1100s; 1110s; 1120s; 1130s
- See also: Other events of 1115; List of years in Ireland

The following is a list of events from the year 1115 in Ireland.

== Incumbents ==
- High King of Ireland: Domnall Ua Lochlainn

== Events ==
- An assault on Norse-Gaelic Dublin by Diarmait mac Énna meic Murchada and Conchobar Ua Conchobair Failge, joint Kings of Leinster, is thwarted by Domnall Gerrlámhach.

== Deaths ==
- Conchobar Ua Conchobair Failge, slain in Dublin.
- Diarmait mac Énna meic Murchada, slain in Dublin.
