= 1113 in Ireland =

- Centuries: 11th; 12th; 13th; 14th
- Decades: 1100s; 1110s; 1120s; 1130s
- See also: Other events of 1113; List of years in Ireland

The following is a list of events from the year 1113 in Ireland.

== Incumbents ==
- High King of Ireland: Domnall Ua Lochlainn

== Events ==
- An army was led by Domhnall Ua Lochlainn, with the chiefs of Cinel-Eoghain, Cinel-Conaill, and Airghialla, to Gleann where the group banished Donnchadh from the kingdom of Ulidia and gave his lands to Ua Duinnsleibhe (nobleman), while the group retained Dál-Araidhe and Uí Eathach.
- The Order of St. Bernard was commenced.

== Deaths ==
- Diarmaid Ua Longain, steward of Munster
