= 1103 in Ireland =

- Centuries: 11th; 12th; 13th; 14th
- Decades: 1100s; 1110s; 1120s
- See also: Other events of 1103; List of years in Ireland

Events from the year 1103 in Ireland.

== Incumbents ==
- High King of Ireland: Domnall Ua Lochlainn

== Died ==
- Magnus Olafsson (Old Norse: Magnús Óláfsson, Norwegian: Magnus Olavsson; 1073 – 24 August 1103), better known as Magnus Barefoot (Old Norse: Magnús berfœttr)
