= 1116 in Ireland =

- Centuries: 11th; 12th; 13th; 14th
- Decades: 1100s; 1110s; 1120s; 1130s
- See also: Other events of 1116; List of years in Ireland

The following is a list of events from the year 1116 in Ireland.

== Incumbents ==
- High King of Ireland: Domnall Ua Lochlainn

== Events ==
- Famine.
- Diarmait Ua Briain, king of Munster, attacked Muirchertach and Brian Ua Briain "in violation of a mutual oath on the relics of Ireland" besieging Limerick. This resulted in Muirchertach making peace with Diarmait but he was eventually captured by Muircheartach.

== Births ==
Ruaidrí Ua Conchobair (Modern Irish: Ruaidhrí Ó Conchobhair, or, Ruairí Ó Conchúir; commonly anglicised as Rory O'Conor) (d. 1198) was King of Connacht from 1156 to 1186, and High King of Ireland from 1166 to 1183. He was the last High King of Ireland before the Norman invasion of Ireland (Brian Ua Néill and Edward Bruce both claimed the title with opposition in later years).
