= Bangor Abbey =

Irish monastery

- Mainistir Bheannchair
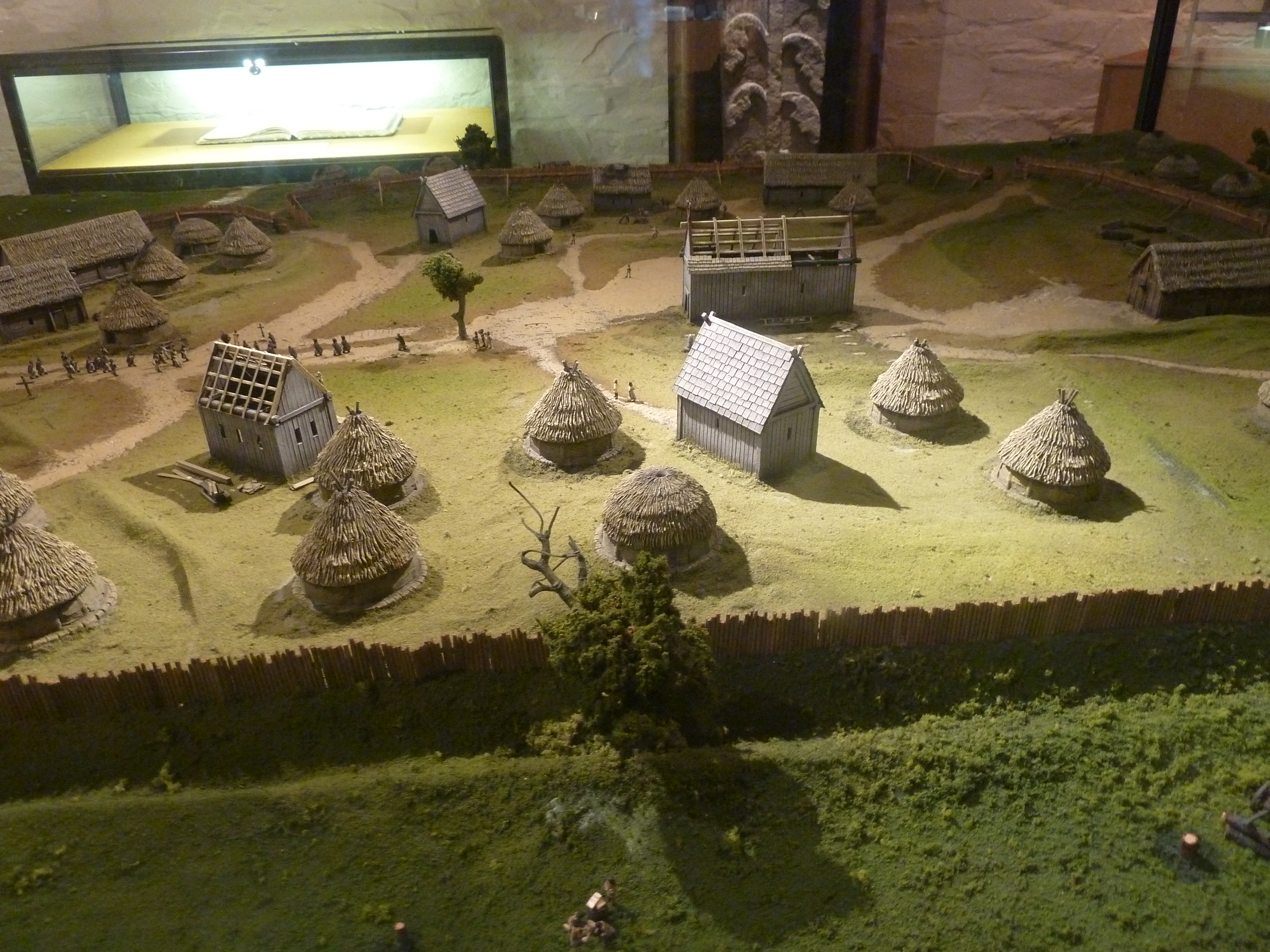
- Model of Bangor Abbey in AD 688

- Location within County Down Location within island of Ireland

Monastery information
- Other names: Bennchor; Vallis Angelorum; White Choir
- Order: Celtic monasticism Augustinian Canons Regular
- Denomination: Catholic
- Established: AD 552–559
- Disestablished: 1539
- Reestablished: c. 1123–24
- Mother house: Armagh Abbey (as an Augustinian monastery)
- Diocese: Down

People
- Founder: Comgall

Architecture
- Functional status: Buildings incorporated into Church of Ireland church
- Heritage designation: Grade B+ listed building
- Style: Celtic monastic

Site
- Location: Bangor, County Down
- Country: Northern Ireland
- Coordinates: 54°39′22″N 5°40′30″W
- Public access: yes
- Website: bangorabbey.org

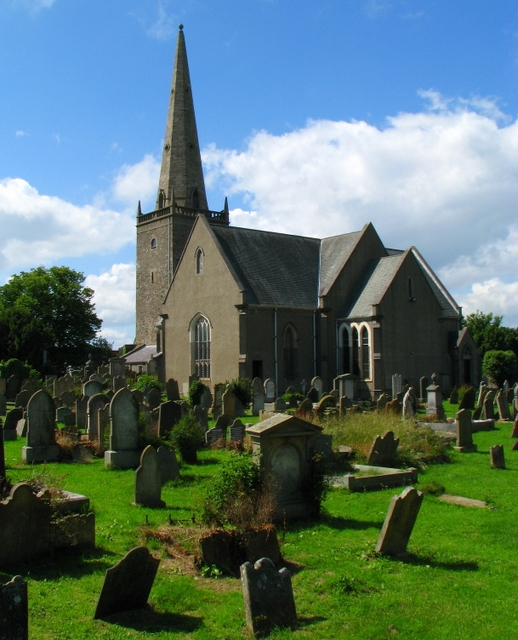
Bangor Abbey and graveyard

Bangor Abbey was established by Saint Comgall in 558 in Bangor, County Down, Ireland and was famous for its learning and austere rule. It is not to be confused with the slightly older abbey in Wales on the site of Bangor Cathedral.

== History ==
=== Foundation ===
Comgall founded the monastery at Bangor about 558 A.D. in County Down, on the southern shore of Belfast Lough. The ancient Annals differ about the exact year, giving various dates between 552 and 559. The earliest, the Annals of Tighernach, and the Annals of Innisfallen, give 558 A.D. as the date of the foundation. The name was sometimes written "Beannchor." The place was also called the "Vale of Angels," because, according to a popular legend, St Patrick once rested there and saw the valley filled with angels.

Comgall was born in Antrim in 517, and educated at Clooneenagh and Clonmacnoise. The spirit of monasticism was then strong in Ireland. Many sought solitude to better serve God, and with this object Comgall retired to a lonely island. The persuasions of his friends drew him from his retreat; later on he founded the monastery of Bangor.

Under his rule, which was rigid, prayer and fasting were incessant. Food was scant and plain. Worship held the foremost place in the life of the community. It is clear that music was a prominent feature of the worship of the Bangor monks. Crowds came to share his penances and his vigils; they also came for learning.

=== School ===
Bangor Abbey is regarded as one of the most important of the early Irish monastic sites, second only to Armagh. Within the extensive rampart which encircled its monastic buildings, students studied scripture, theology, logic, geometry, arithmetic, music, and the classics. Mo Sinu moccu Min was the fifth abbot of Bangor. It is thought that he tutored Columbanus. Robin Flower wrote that "It is clear that particular attention was paid to historical studies at Bangor, and the earliest Irish chronicle was probably a production of that house."

Bangor was a major centre of learning—called the "Light of the World"—and trained many missionaries. Carthach of Lismore studied at Bangor, as did Fintan of Doon. Saint Mirin was a prior at Bangor before leaving to found Paisley Abbey in Renfrewshire. Columbanus and Gall went off to Continental Europe in 590 AD and founded the famous monasteries of Luxeuil Abbey (France), St Gallen (Switzerland) and Bobbio (Italy).

=== Decline ===
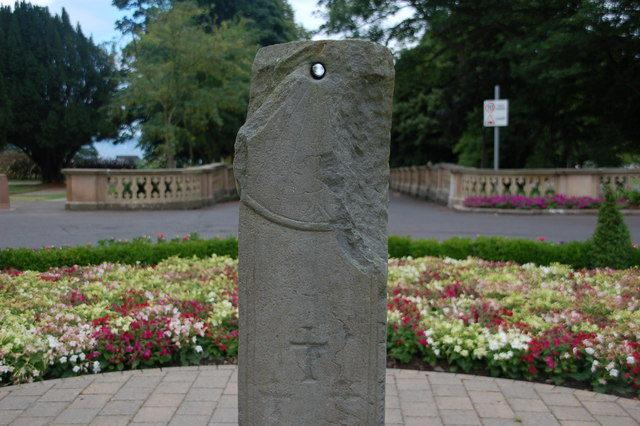
The ruined Bangor Sundial (c. 900), now on display outside the town hall

Like many early Irish monasteries, Bangor was destroyed and rebuilt on a number of occasions. The Annals of Ulster record that Bangor was burned in 616 and again in 755. No doubt at this period the buildings were constructed of wood. Easily accessible from the sea, Bangor invited attack, and between 822 and 824 the Norsemen plundered it. The Annals of Ulster and the Four Masters both record that during this raid, “learned men and bishops” were smitten, while the shrine containing the relics of Comgall was taken. Another probable victim of the Vikings was “Tanaidhe MacUidhir, coarb of Bennchor, who was killed in 958. There is a consensus that the importance of Bangor declined around the latter part of the 10th century.

When St Malachy, in 1121, became Abbot of Bangor he had to build everything anew. However, three years later he was promoted to the See of Down, and Bangor again decayed. By the Statutes of Kilkenny the "mere Irishmen" were excluded from making profession there.

In 1469, the Franciscans had possession of it, and a century later the Augustinians, after which, at the dissolution of the monasteries in that part of Ireland, it was given by James I to Sir James Hamilton who repaired the church in 1617 and was buried in it when he died in 1644. It appears that stone from the abbey was used in the construction of the new church. All that remains of the Abbey ruins is St Malachy's Wall.

The present tower of the church dates back to the 14th century. A mural in the church is of Christ ascending to heaven with Saints Comgall, Gall and Columbanus at his feet.

== Antiphonary of Bangor ==
The Antiphonary of Bangor was probably written by the monks of Bangor Abbey between 602 and 691. It was housed at Bobbio in Italy for over 1000 years. The manuscript, which contains a collection of Latin hymns, prayers and antiphons is one of the earliest surviving dateable monastic manuscripts from Ireland and has been described as one of the most precious surviving witnesses to the early Irish church. The manuscript provides an important insight into monastic life in Ireland and is also testament to the artistic and literary standard of the work attributed to the monks of Bangor in the 7th century.

Nothing now remains of the original buildings of Comgall's monastery. In the Private Chapel at Clandeboye, however, may be seen, built into the wall, the shaft of a Cross, which was found in the Abbey precincts. This is a fragment of a Celtic High Cross, which may have stood on "the Cross Hill" adjacent to Bangor Castle, and which is indicated on a 17th-century map. This fragment probably dates from about the 8th century.

== Gallery ==
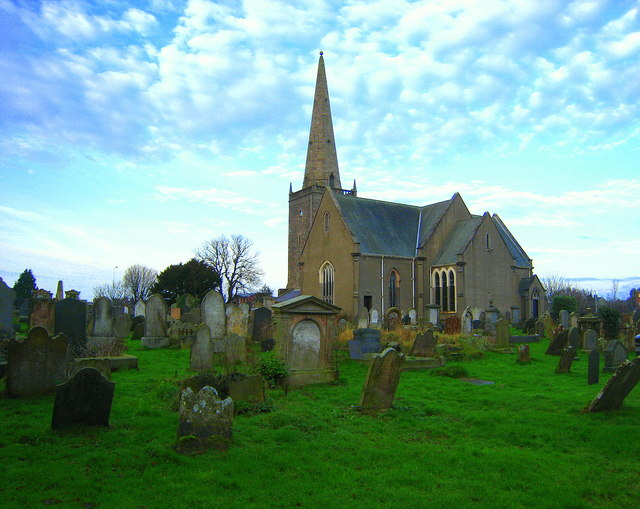
Bangor Abbey and graveyard

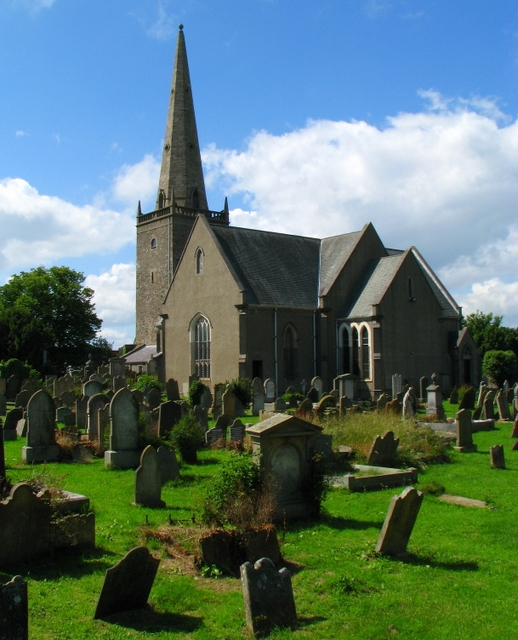
Another view

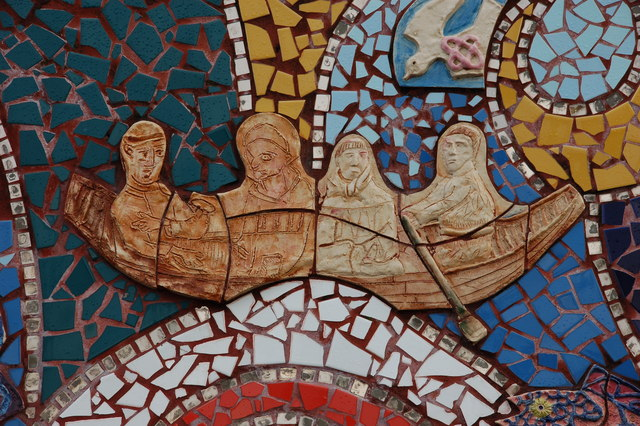
Mosaic from Bangor harbour depicting St Comgall and other monks.

== See also ==
- Abbeys and priories in Northern Ireland (County Down)
