= 1102 in Ireland =

- Centuries: 11th; 12th; 13th; 14th
- Decades: 1100s; 1110s; 1120s
- See also: Other events of 1102; List of years in Ireland

Events from the year 1102 in Ireland.

== Incumbents ==
- High King of Ireland: Domnall Ua Lochlainn

== Events ==
- Arnulf de Montgomery, Lord of Pembroke, being banished from England and Wales for joining with his brother in rebellion against Henry I of England, serves his father-in-law, Muirchertach Ua Briain, High King of Ireland; Henry imposes a trade embargo against Ireland.
- Betrothal of Muirchertach Ua Briain's daughters: Lafracoth to Arnulf de Montgomery and Bjaðmunjo to Sigurd (son of Magnus Barefoot).
- Archbishop Anselm of Canterbury writes to Muirchertach Ua Briain urging ecclesiastical reform and restoring good relations between him and Henry I of England.
- Domnall Ua Conchobair becomes King of Connacht

== Births ==
- Gilla na Naemh Ua Duinn, poet, historian and cleric (died 1160).
- Approximate date and probable location – Harald IV Gille of Norway (killed 1136).

== Deaths ==
- Mugrón Ua Morgair, archlector of Armagh.
- Domnall Ua Ruairc, King of Connacht and Breifne.
