= Semon =

Semon may refer to:

- Charles Semon (1814–1877), German and British businessman, politician and philanthropist
- Felix Semon (1841–1921), German neurobiologist and laryngologist
- Henry Semon (1884–1958), American farmer, businessman, and politician
- Larry Semon (1889–1928), American actor, director, producer, and screenwriter during the silent film era
- Mo Chuaroc moccu Neth Semon (fl. c. 600?), an Irish monk and scholar of the Early Middle Ages
- Richard Semon (1859–1918), German zoologist and evolutionary biologist
- Waldo Semon (1898–1999), American inventor born in Demopolis, Alabama

== See also ==
- Semon's Leaf-nosed Bat, species of bat in the family Hipposideridae, found in Australia and Papua New Guinea
- Semon Knudsen (1912–1998), prominent automobile executive
