= 1646 in Ireland =

- Centuries: 15th; 16th; 17th; 18th; 19th
- Decades: 1620s; 1630s; 1640s; 1650s; 1660s
- See also: Other events of 1646; List of years in Ireland

Events from the year 1646 in Ireland.

== Incumbent ==
- Monarch: Charles I

== Events ==
- 3 March – the title of Earl of Leinster in the Peerage of Ireland is created for Robert Cholmondeley.
- 28 March – the first "Ormonde Peace": the Supreme Council of the Irish Catholic Confederation signs an agreement with James Butler, Marquess of Ormonde, as lieutenant of Charles I of England which would procure some rights for Catholics in return for their military support of the royalists in England, but this is renounced by the Confederation's General Assembly.
- 5 June – the Battle of Benburb, part of the Irish Confederate Wars, takes place in County Tyrone. The forces of Catholic Confederate Ireland under Owen Roe O'Neill secure a decisive victory over a Scottish Covenanter and Anglo-Irish army led by Robert Monro.
- 29 June – battle at Laught (Leacht), part of the Irish Confederate Wars, between Tadhg Mór and his brother Laughlin Ó Cellaigh (who is killed).

== Arts and literature ==
- Henry Burkhead's closet drama Cola's Fury, or Lirenda's Misery, based on the Irish Rebellion of 1641, is published in Kilkenny (dated 1645).

== Births ==
- 24 August – Roger Boyle, 2nd Earl of Orrery, politician (d. 1682)
- John Davys, politician (d. 1689)
- Antoine Hamilton, author (d. 1720)

== Deaths ==
- 29 June – Laughlin Ó Cellaigh, chief.
