= 1112 in Ireland =

- Centuries: 11th; 12th; 13th; 14th
- Decades: 1100s; 1110s; 1120s; 1130s
- See also: Other events of 1112; List of years in Ireland

The following is a list of events from the year 1112 in Ireland.

== Incumbents ==
- High King of Ireland: Domnall Ua Lochlainn

== Events ==
- Muirchertach Ua Briain, king of Munster and dominant figure, led a hosting (military expedition) into Connacht in 1112.
- The fort of Ard-Macha, with its church, was burned on April 10, along with 2 streets of Trian-Masan.

== Deaths ==
- Ughaire Ua Lorcain, lord of Ui-Muireadhaigh
