= 1121 in Ireland =

- Centuries: 11th; 12th; 13th; 14th
- Decades: 1100s; 1110s; 1120s; 1130s; 1140s
- See also: Other events of 1121; List of years in Ireland

Events from the year 1121 in Ireland.

== Incumbents ==
- High King of Ireland: Domnall Ua Lochlainn

== Deaths ==
- Muireadhach Ua Flaithbheartaigh, King of Iar Connacht.
