= 1119 in Ireland =

- Centuries: 11th; 12th; 13th; 14th
- Decades: 1100s; 1110s; 1120s; 1130s
- See also: Other events of 1119; List of years in Ireland

Events from the year 1119 in Ireland.

== Incumbents ==
- High King of Ireland: Domnall Ua Lochlainn (alleged), Muirchertach Ua Briain (before c.10 March)

== Events ==
- Máel Máedóc Ua Morgair (Saint Malachy) was made a priest, as vicar to Celsus.

== Deaths ==
- c.10 March – Muirchertach Ua Briain, reigning King of Munster since 1086 and claimant to the Kingship of Ireland
- Aedh Ua Con Ceannainn, King of Uí Díarmata.
