= Saint Alina =

Saint Alina may refer to:

- Saint Alena, born in Dilbeek, Belgium, and martyred c. 640
- Blessed Alina Martain, a Benedictine nun who died in 1125.
