= 1110 in Ireland =

- Centuries: 11th; 12th; 13th; 14th
- Decades: 1100s; 1110s; 1120s; 1130s
- See also: Other events of 1110; List of years in Ireland

The following is a list of events from the year 1110 in Ireland.

== Incumbents ==
- High King of Ireland: Domnall Ua Lochlainn

== Events ==
In the time leading up to the Norman invasion of Ireland, the Normans, were invited guests of Irish royalty.

== Deaths ==
- Gilla Coluim ua Maelmuaid, king of Fir Cell.
- Mael Ruanaid ua Machainén, king of Mugdorna.
- Flan O'Kennedy, abbot and poet.
