= 1114 in Ireland =

- Centuries: 11th; 12th; 13th; 14th
- Decades: 1100s; 1110s; 1120s; 1130s
- See also: Other events of 1114; List of years in Ireland

The following is a list of events from the year 1114 in Ireland.

== Incumbents ==
- High King of Ireland: Domnall Ua Lochlainn (alleged), Muirchertach Ua Briain

== Events ==
- First entry from Mac Carthaigh's Book
- Diarmait Ua Briain becomes King of Munster

== Deaths ==
- Maelcoluim Ua Cormacain, Abbot of Aran
