= Martain =

Martain is a surname. Notable people with the surname include:

- Alina Martain (late 11th century–1125), French nun and saint
- Giolla Ernain Ó Martain (died 1218), Irish poet

== See also ==
- Martian
