= 1127 in Ireland =

- Centuries: 11th; 12th; 13th; 14th
- Decades: 1100s; 1110s; 1120s; 1130s; 1140s
- See also: Other events of 1127; List of years in Ireland

Events from the year 1127 in Ireland.

== Incumbents ==
- High King of Ireland: Toirdelbach Ua Conchobair

== Events ==
- Building starts on Cormac's Chapel, on the Rock of Cashel, Cashel, County Tipperary (and lasts until 1134).
