= 1111 in Ireland =

- Centuries: 11th; 12th; 13th; 14th
- Decades: 1100s; 1110s; 1120s; 1130s
- See also: Other events of 1111; List of years in Ireland

The following is a list of events from the year 1111 in Ireland.

== Incumbents ==
- High King of Ireland: Domnall Ua Lochlainn

== Events ==
- Synod of Rathbreasail, presided over by Cellach Ua Sinaig, Abbot of Armagh is held. Ireland is divided into territorial dioceses (24 sees) under two metropolitans, the Archbishop of Armagh and the Archbishop of Cashel.
- Domnall mac Taidc temporarily seizes the Kingdom of the Isles (the Hebrides and the Isle of Man) by force.
