= 1649 in Ireland =

- Centuries: 15th; 16th; 17th; 18th; 19th
- Decades: 1620s; 1630s; 1640s; 1650s; 1660s
- See also: Other events of 1649; List of years in Ireland

Events from the year 1649 in Ireland.

== Incumbent ==
- Monarch: Charles I (until 30 January), monarchy abolished.

== Events ==
- 30 January
  - King Charles I of England, Scotland and Ireland is beheaded in London.
  - Prince Charles Stuart declares himself King Charles II of England, Scotland and Ireland. At the time all three Kingdoms had not recognised him as ruler.
- 22 May–October – Robert Blake blockades Prince Rupert's fleet in Kinsale.
- 2 August – Battle of Rathmines – a combined Irish Confederate and English Royalist force trying to besiege Dublin is routed by the English Parliamentarians with heavy casualties.
- 15 August – Oliver Cromwell lands in Dublin with the New Model Army to begin the Cromwellian conquest of Ireland.
- 3 September – Siege of Drogheda begins.
- 11 September – Sack of Drogheda: Cromwell takes the town and put its Irish Catholic Confederation garrison to death.
- 2 October – siege of Wexford begins.
- 11 October – Sack of Wexford: Cromwell's forces take and sack the town, killing many of its defenders and several hundred civilians.
- 19 October – New Ross falls to the English Parliamentarian forces.
- November (early) – Battle of Arklow: An Irish force attacks Cromwell's army as it marches south but is beaten off.
- 19 November – Carrick-on-Suir taken by stealth by Cromwellian forces after they discover an undefended gate. An Irish counter-attack under Major Geoghegan on 24 November is repulsed with five hundred Irish Confederate soldiers killed.
- November 24 – Cromwell's army arrives before Waterford to besiege the city.
- 6 December – Battle of Lisnagarvey – a Scottish Covenanter force is routed by the English Parliamentarian New Model Army.
- 10 December – Cromwell calls off the siege of Waterford and retires to Youghal: due to bad weather and disease, only 3,000 of his 6,500 besieging force are still fit for duty.

== Deaths ==
- 11 September – Arthur Aston, Royalist commander (killed during the sack of Drogheda), (b. 1590)
- 6 November – Owen Roe O'Neill Irish Catholic general (dies of disease), (b. 1590)
- December – Michael Jones, English Parliamentarian general (dies of disease at the siege of Waterford).
