= 1122 in Ireland =

- Centuries: 11th; 12th; 13th; 14th
- Decades: 1100s; 1110s; 1120s; 1130s; 1140s
- See also: Other events of 1122; List of years in Ireland

The following events occurred in Ireland in the year 1122.

== Incumbents ==
- High King of Ireland: Toirdelbach Ua Conchobair

== Events ==
- Tairrdelbach Ua Conchobair ravages the Kingdom of Desmond for the second time
- Ruaidrí na Saide Buide Ua Conchobair captures Tairrdelbach Ua Conchobair

== Deaths ==
- Arnulf de Montgomery Anglo-Norman magnate (born c. 1066)
- Máel Coluim Ua Brolcháin Bishop of Derry
