= 1129 in Ireland =

- Centuries: 11th; 12th; 13th; 14th
- Decades: 1100s; 1110s; 1120s; 1130s; 1140s
- See also: Other events of 1129; List of years in Ireland

Events from the year 1129 in Ireland.

== Incumbents ==
- High King: Toirdelbach Ua Conchobair

== Deaths ==
- Saint Ceallach (Celsus), (b 1080), abbot of Armagh. He presided at the synod of Rathbreasail in 1111.
