= 1128 in Ireland =

- Centuries: 11th; 12th; 13th; 14th
- Decades: 1100s; 1110s; 1120s; 1130s; 1140s
- See also: Other events of 1128; List of years in Ireland

Events from the year 1128 in Ireland.

== Incumbents ==
- High King of Ireland: Toirdelbach Ua Conchobair

== Births ==
- St. Laurence O'Toole, (died 1180) or Lorcán Ua Tuathail, was born at Castledermot, County Kildare

== Deaths ==
- Mac Aodh Ua Dubhda, King of Uí Fiachrach Muaidhe
