= Gilla Mo Choinni Ua Cathail =

Gilla Mo Choinni Ua Cathail (died 1147) was King of Uí Fiachrach Aidhne.

Gilla Mo Choinni was the only member of the Ó Cathail sept to rule Aidhne. He was a descendant of Cathal mac Ógán. They were rulers of Cenél Áeda na hEchtge until expelled by their Ó Seachnasaigh cousins in the 13th century. Thereafter they settled in north County Galway and fell into obscurity.

Preceded by Aodh Ua hEidhin	King of Uí Fiachrach Aidhne; 1121–1147	Succeeded by Gilla Cheallaigh Ua hEidhin
