= 1137 in Ireland =

- Centuries: 11th; 12th; 13th; 14th
- Decades: 1110s; 1120s; 1130s; 1140s; 1150s
- See also: Other events of 1137; List of years in Ireland

Events from the year 1137 in Ireland.

== Incumbents ==
- High King: Toirdelbach Ua Conchobair

== Events ==
- Church in Boyounagh burned
- Gilla Meic Liac mac Diarmata becomes Archbishop of Armagh
