= 1643 in Ireland =

- Centuries: 15th; 16th; 17th; 18th; 19th
- Decades: 1620s; 1630s; 1640s; 1650s; 1660s
- See also: Other events of 1643; List of years in Ireland

Events from the year 1643 in Ireland.

== Incumbent ==
- Monarch: Charles I

== Events ==
- March 18 – Irish Confederate Wars: Battle of New Ross: James Butler, Earl of Ormonde, defeats Thomas Preston and a numerically superior Irish Confederate army north of the town of New Ross.
- June 4 – Confederate Wars: Battle of Funcheon Ford: Catholic Confederation commander James Tuchet, 3rd Earl of Castlehaven's horsemen surprise and rout hundreds of Baron Inchiquin's men near Castlelyons in County Cork.
- September – Confederate Wars: "Cessation" (i.e. ceasefire) arranged by Ormond places the greater part of Ireland into the hands of the Catholic Confederation.
- An Calbhach mac Aedh Ó Conchobhair Donn, The Ó Conchubhair Donn, Chief of the Name of the Clan Ó Conchubhair, is popularly inaugurated as King.

== Deaths ==
- September 15 – Richard Boyle, 1st Earl of Cork, Lord High Treasurer of Ireland (b. 1566)
- Mícheál Ó Cléirigh, chronicler and chief author of the Annals of the Four Masters (b. c. 1590)
