= Boyounagh =

Village in County Galway, Ireland

Boyounagh (Irish: bhuíonach) is a rural village in County Galway, Ireland, northwest of Glenamaddy.

== History ==
The old church of Boyounagh is all destroyed with exception of a fragment of the north wall. The building was 18 ft (5.5 m) wide but its length cannot be ascertained. The natives relate there was a monastery; traces of a foundation of an abbey called An Mainistir are pointed out a short distance to the east of the old graveyard.

The site of the old church is almost in the centre of the pre-Norman Ballybetagh, old town land of Boyounagh. In the 16th/17th century inquisitions it was returned to grand juries as "Ye Fower quarters" of Boyounagh belonging to the Protestant Archbishop of Tuam. The old church of Boyounagh was sited in and surrounded by church lands. In modern times these four quarters consist of eight ordnance survey town lands including Cloonkeen, Meelick, Boyounagh Beg, alias Cunningham village, Boyounagh More alias Middletown and Cashel. In the latter days of landlordism it was called the Boyounagh Estate.

Boyounagh was once mentioned in the Annals of Four Masters when in 1137 the church was burned. There is a tradition that Saint Patrick founded the first church in Boyounagh. Whilst the Annals do not mention St. Jarlath we know he founded a monastery in Tuam in the 5th/6th century and it is probable that the "Coarbes" successors of St. Jarlath had jurisdiction over places like Boyounagh.

Lord Fitzgerald was leaseholder of Boyounagh Estate until his death in 1843. Then Martin McDonnell bought it on 20 June 1859 for £5,850. The Boyounagh estate consisted of Cloonkeen, Meelick, Cashel, Middletown and Gorthaganny. The area of these town lands was 3,914 acres. Martin McDonnell was a merchant from Dunmore. It was said he was a fortunate man to own all of 12,000 acres, collecting all his rent. Tradition has it that he was a good landlord. He died in 1912. His tomb was built in the highest spot so that it could be seen from his house in Dunmore.
