= 1642 in Ireland =

- Centuries: 15th; 16th; 17th; 18th; 19th
- Decades: 1620s; 1630s; 1640s; 1650s; 1660s
- See also: Other events of 1642; List of years in Ireland

Events from the year 1642 in Ireland.

== Incumbent ==
- Monarch: Charles I

== Events ==
- 18 February – a group of Protestant English settlers surrender to Irish authorities at Castlebar in County Mayo in hopes of having their lives spared, but are killed one week later at Shrule on orders of Edmond Bourke.
- 17 March – a group of nobles sign the "Catholic Remonstrance" at Trim, County Meath addressed to King Charles I.
- 19 March – the citizens of Galway seize an English naval ship and close the town gates in support of the Irish Rebellion of 1641.
- 22 March – in a Catholic synod at Kells chaired by Hugh O'Reilly (Archbishop of Armagh), a majority of bishops proclaim that the rebellion is a just war.
- 26 March – Siege of Drogheda broken by English reinforcements.
- 14 April – Battle of Kilrush: English troops under the James Butler, Earl of Ormonde defeat Irish rebels under James's cousin, Richard Butler, 3rd Viscount Mountgarret.
- 10 May – in a Catholic synod at Kilkenny, bishops draft the Confederate Oath of Association, calling on Catholics to swear allegiance to Charles I and to obey orders and decrees made by a "Supreme Council of the Confederate Catholics", hence the rebels become known as Confederate Ireland.
- 18 May–23 June – Siege of Limerick: the English Protestant garrison of King John's Castle (Limerick) is forced to surrender by the Confederate Ireland Munster army led by General Garret Barry.
- 16 June – the Battle of Glenmaquin takes place in County Donegal, with the Protestant Laggan Army decisively defeating Confederate Ireland soldiers.
- July – Battle of Liscarroll: Murrough O'Brien, 1st Earl of Inchiquin, leading an English force, routs an Irish rebel army under Garret Barry advancing on Cork.
- 4 August – Alexander Forbes, 10th Lord Forbes, relieves Forthill and besieges Galway.
- c. August – Covenanter Campbell soldiers of the Argyll's Foot, encouraged by their commanding officer Sir Duncan Campbell of Auchinbreck, massacre the Catholic MacDonald residents of Rathlin Island.
- 7 September – Lord Forbes raises his unsuccessful siege of Galway.
- 24 October – the first Confederate Assembly is held in Kilkenny where it sets up a provisional government, largely Catholic Royalist; start of the Irish Confederate Wars.
- c. 14 November – the Confederate Assembly elects a Supreme Council.
- The Presbytery of Ulster, a predecessor of the Presbyterian Church in Ireland, is created by chaplains of the Presbyterian Scottish army in Ulster.

== Deaths ==
- 7 February – William Bedell, Church of Ireland Bishop of Kilmore (b. 1571)
- 6 June – Robert Digby, 1st Baron Digby, peer and Governor of King's County.
- 29 September – David Barry, 1st Earl of Barrymore, dies of wounds received at the Battle of Liscarroll (b. 1604)
