= 1647 in Ireland =

- Centuries: 15th; 16th; 17th; 18th; 19th
- Decades: 1620s; 1630s; 1640s; 1650s; 1660s
- See also: Other events of 1647; List of years in Ireland

Events from the year 1647 in Ireland.

== Incumbent ==
- Monarch: Charles I

== Events ==
- July – James Butler, 1st Duke of Ormonde, surrenders Dublin to parliamentary forces under Michael Jones.
- August – Battle of Dungan's Hill, Confederate Ireland army intercepted on a march towards Dublin and destroyed by Parliamentary army.
- September – Sack of Cashel: Murrough O'Brien, 1st Earl of Inchiquin, slaughters the Confederate Ireland garrison at Cashel. The priest Theobald Stapleton suffers summary execution. Inchiquin goes on to devastate Catholic-held Munster.
- November – Battle of Knocknanuss, Murrough O'Brien, 1st Earl of Inchiquin's Parliamentarian army inflicts crushing defeat on Confederate Ireland's Munster army.

== Births ==
- Adam Loftus, 1st Viscount Lisburne, courtier and military commander (d. 1691)

== Deaths ==
- 13 September – Theobald Stapleton, priest and writer, put to death in Sack of Cashel (b. 1589)
- Garret Barry, soldier, served in the Eighty Years' War and the Irish Confederate Wars, military writer.
- Col Ciotach, adventurer of Clan Donald, Laird of Colonsay (b. 1570)
- Alasdair MacColla, Scottish/Irish soldier, son of Colla Ciotach, killed at the battle of Knocknanuss.
