= 1648 in Ireland =

- Centuries: 15th; 16th; 17th; 18th; 19th
- Decades: 1620s; 1630s; 1640s; 1650s; 1660s
- See also: Other events of 1648; List of years in Ireland

Events from the year 1648 in Ireland.

== Incumbent ==
- Monarch: Charles I

== Events ==
- March – Murrough O'Brien, 1st Earl of Inchiquin changes sides and declares for the King.
- September – open breach between Owen Roe O'Neill and Confederate Council.
- September – Murrough O'Brien, 1st Earl of Inchiquin welcomes the Marquis of Ormond when he returns to Ireland.

== Births ==
- Henry Colley, politician (d. 1719)
- Edward Fitzharris, intriguer (d. 1681)

== Deaths ==
- Richard Martin fitz Oliver, lawyer, member of the Catholic Confederates of Ireland and Mayor of Galway (b. c. 1602)
