= 1650 in Ireland =

- Centuries: 15th; 16th; 17th; 18th; 19th
- Decades: 1630s; 1640s; 1650s; 1660s; 1670s
- See also: Other events of 1650; List of years in Ireland

Events from the year 1650 in Ireland.

== Events ==
- 27 March – Confederate Ireland's besieged capital Kilkenny is surrendered to Cromwell.
- 27 April – Cromwellian conquest of Ireland: Oliver Cromwell joins the siege of Clonmel in person.
- 1 May – Charles II repudiates his alliance with Irish Catholics in favour of one with Scottish Covenanters in the Treaty of Breda. Most English Royalists in Ireland surrender to the Parliamentarians after this point.
- 10 May – Battle of Macroom: Irish force defeated by English Parliamentarians.
- 17 May – Siege of Clonmel: Cromwell's troops storm the walls, taking up to 2,500 casualties. Although they are unable to take the town by force, the garrison, without supplies, slips away under cover of darkness.
- 26 May – Cromwell leaves Ireland from Youghal and passes his command to Henry Ireton.
- 19 June – Battle of Tecroghan: an Irish force successfully relieves the siege of Tecroghan Castle in County Westmeath
- 21 June – Battle of Scarrifholis: the Irish Catholic Ulster Army is routed by the English Parliamentarians under Charles Coote, near Letterkenny, with up to 3,000 dead.
- 25 October – Battle of Meelick Island: English Parliamentarians rout the Irish Connaught Army.
- December – The Duke of Ormonde, erstwhile Royalist commander in Ireland, gives up his command and leaves for France.

== Arts and literature ==
- Andrew Marvell writes An Horatian Ode upon Cromwell's Return from Ireland.

== Births ==
- May – William King, Church of Ireland Archbishop of Dublin and author (d.1729)

== Deaths ==
- 11 May – Boetius MacEgan, Catholic Bishop of Ross, hanged by the English Parliamentarians after the Battle of Macroom.
- 21 July – Henry O'Neill, son of Owen Roe O'Neill, executed by the English Parliamentarians after the Battle of Scarrifholis.
- July – Heber MacMahon, Roman Catholic Bishop of Clogher, executed by English Parliamentarian forces under Charles Coote (b.1600)
