= Gilla Cheallaigh Ua hEidhin =

Gilla Cheallaigh Ua hEidhin (died 1153) was King of Uí Fiachrach Aidhne.

Preceded by Gilla Mo Choinni Ua Cathail	King of Uí Fiachrach Aidhne; 1147–1153	Succeeded by Muirgheas Ua hEidhin
