= 1123 in Ireland =

- Centuries: 11th; 12th; 13th; 14th
- Decades: 1100s; 1110s; 1120s; 1130s; 1140s
- See also: Other events of 1123; List of years in Ireland

Events from the year 1123 in Ireland.

== Incumbents ==
- High King of Ireland: Toirdelbach Ua Conchobair

== Events ==
- Maollosa O'Conchubhair receives the Cross of Cong
