= 1651 in Ireland =

- Centuries: 15th; 16th; 17th; 18th; 19th
- Decades: 1630s; 1640s; 1650s; 1660s; 1670s
- See also: Other events of 1651; List of years in Ireland

Events from the year 1651 in Ireland.

== Events ==
- January - Edmund Ludlow lands in Ireland as lieutenant-general of horse and second-in-command to Henry Ireton.
- June - restart of the siege of Limerick by English Parliamentarian troops under Ireton.
- July - Battle of Knocknaclashy. Irish force trying to relieve Limerick is routed.
- August - start of the siege of Galway: an English Parliamentarian army under Charles Coote blockades the city.
- October 27 - siege of Limerick: Hugh Dubh O'Neill surrenders Limerick after part of the English Royalist garrison mutinies. The soldiers are permitted to march unarmed to Galway but some leaders are executed.
- November 26 - Henry Ireton dies of fever and is succeeded in command by Edmund Ludlow.

== Deaths ==
- October 31 - executions by the English Parliamentarians after the surrender of Limerick:
  - Terence Albert O'Brien, Roman Catholic Bishop of Emly (b.1600)
  - Dominic Fanning, Alderman.
- November 26 - Henry Ireton, English Parliamentarian commander (b.1611)
- Richard Butler, 3rd Viscount Mountgarret, landowner and former Irish Confederate military commander (b.1578)
