= 1124 in Ireland =

- Centuries: 11th; 12th; 13th; 14th
- Decades: 1100s; 1110s; 1120s; 1130s; 1140s
- See also: Other events of 1124; List of years in Ireland

Events from the year 1124 in Ireland.

== Incumbents ==
- High King: Toirdelbach Ua Conchobair

== Events ==
- Dún Bhun na Gaillimhe ('Fort at the Mouth of the Gaillimh') was constructed by the King of Connacht Tairrdelbach Ua Conchobair.

== Births ==
- Tigernán Ua Ruairc, ruler of the Kingdom of Breifne
