= Adalbert von Mörsberg =

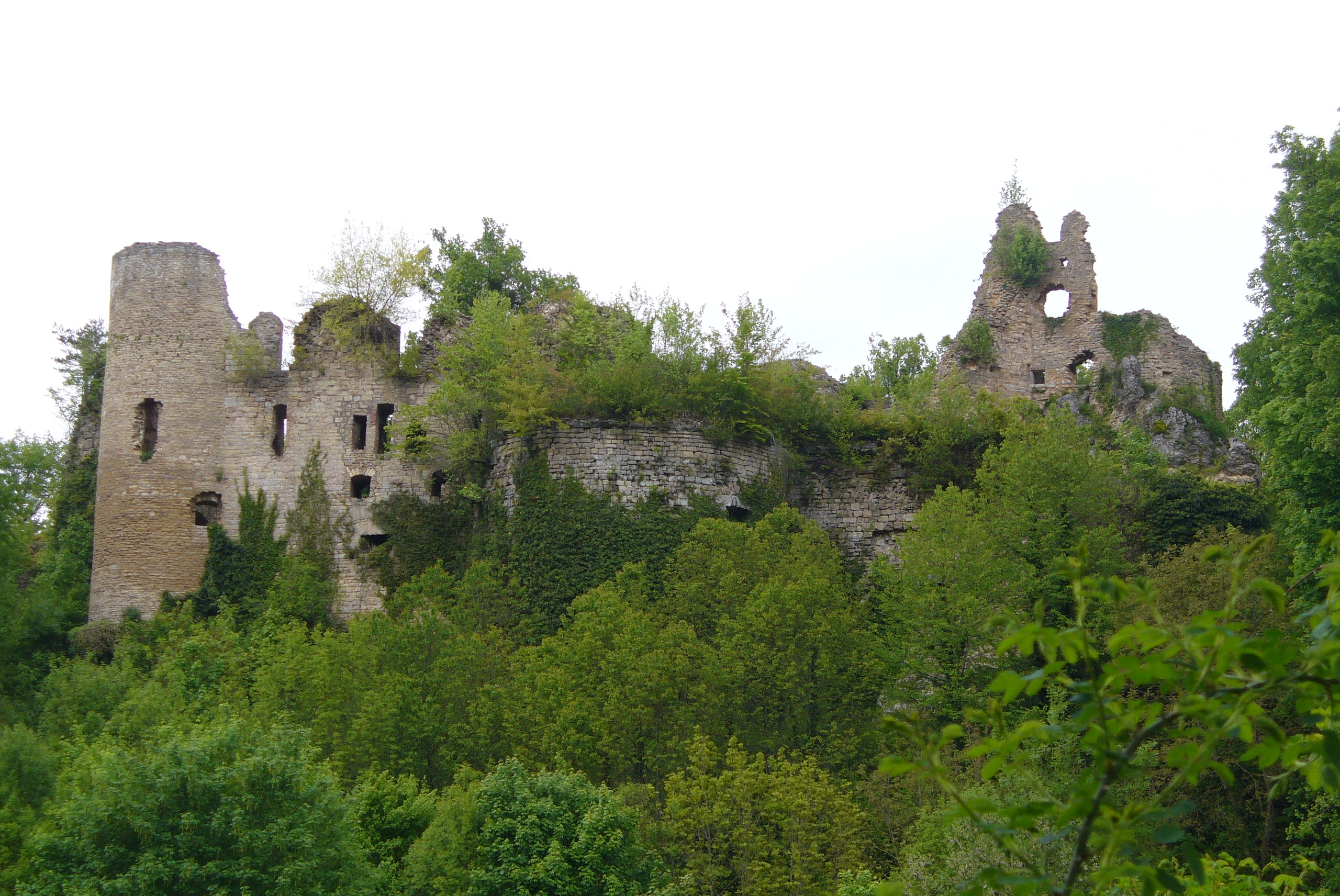
Mörsberg Castle in Alsace / Château de Morimont

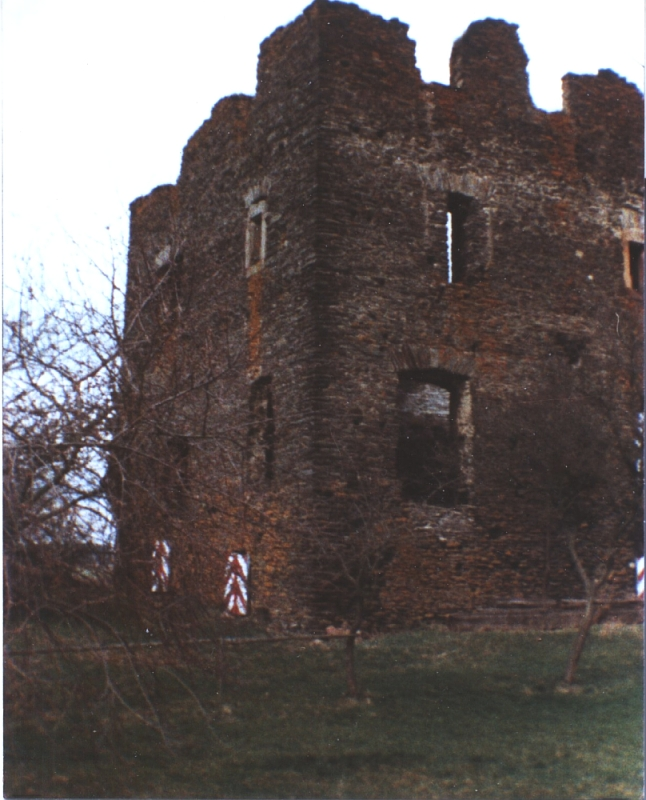
Dill Castle in Hunsrück

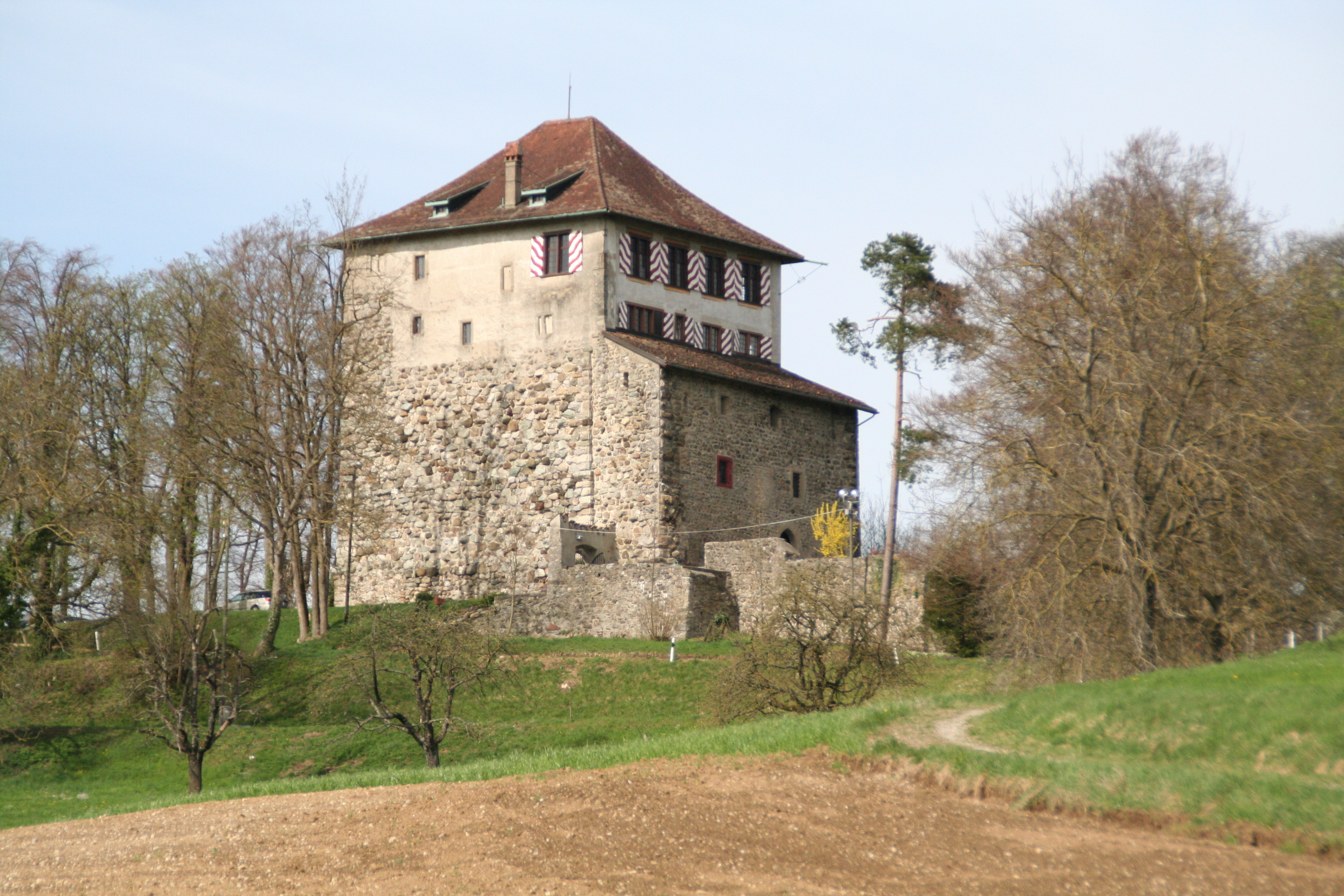
Mörsburg Castle near Winterthur

Adalbert II Count of Mörsberg (Moersberg in 26-letter alphabet) (born about 1070, died between 1124 and August 30, 1125) was Vogt of the monasteries Allerheiligen in Schaffhausen, Switzerland, and Pfaffen-Schwabenheim near Bad Kreuznach, Germany, Count of Dill, Germany, and Mörsberg (now a part of France), as well as owner of the Mörsburg castle near Winterthur.

Adalbert seems to have been born around 1070 A.D. as son of Eberhard VII. von Nellenburg. One of his uncles was archbishop of Trier, another one was the abbot of the Benedictine abbey of Reichenau island.

Only some five years later, Adalbert lost his father who died in 1075 in the Saxon Rebellion. Between 1096 and 1098, already during the lifetime of his uncle Burchard III, the governing Count f Nellenburg, he took over the charge of the proprietary monasteries of the Nellenburgers as a Vogt. There he acquired a bad reputation because of illegitimate demands for monasterial property and brutality against the monks. Contemporary documents prove the efforts of his relatives to make amends for the damage caused by Adalbert.

By marrying Mechthild of Bar-Mömpelgard, daughter of Theodoric I, Count of Montbéliard of House Scarponnois and Ermentrude of Burgundy, heiress of the County of Montbéliard, Adalbert attained ownership of Château de Morimont near Ferrette in Alsace after death of his father-in-law in 1105. At that time he took the title of a Count of Morisberk which is not documented before and after his lifetime.

When also his uncle died in 1105 or 1106 without any male descendants, Adalbert's older brother Dietrich received the family seat and title of a Count of Nellenburg while Adalbert himself received a considerable share of allod (including Dill castle in Hunsrück with the monastery of Schwabenheim near Kreuznach, properties in Sponheim, Hamm, Kastellaun,) and the Nellenburg fiefs (the Kreuznach imperial estate with Böckelheim castle). In 1107, he is documented as Count of Dill. Mörsburg castle near Winterthur was named after him. Dill castle and Mörsburg seem to have been strengthened substantially or were probably only erected at the time.

His cousin Bruno of Bretten was archbishop of Trier from 1102 to 1124.

Adalbert wedded his daughter Mechthild (d. March 12, 1152/80) to Meginhard of Sponheim (c. 1085 to c. 1135). This act was of great importance since the title of count and considerable property were transferred to Meginhard which prompted the formation of the County of Sponheim.
