= 1644 in Ireland =

- Centuries: 15th; 16th; 17th; 18th; 19th
- Decades: 1620s; 1630s; 1640s; 1650s; 1660s
- See also: Other events of 1644; List of years in Ireland

Events from the year 1644 in Ireland.

== Incumbent ==
- Monarch: Charles I

== Events ==
- October 24 – the Long Parliament of England passes an Ordinance of no quarter to the Irish.

== Births ==
- Richard Pyne, judge (d. 1709)

== Deaths ==
- May 26 – Roche MacGeoghegan, Dominican Bishop of Kildare (b. 1580)
- September 7 – Ralph Corbie, Jesuit priest (b. 1598) (hanged)
- September 13 – Peter Wadding, Jesuit theologian (b. c.1581)
- December – Michael Wadding, Jesuit priest and missionary to New Spain (b. 1591)
- Geoffrey Keating (Seathrún Céitinn), historian (b. c.1569)
