= 1645 in Ireland =

- Centuries: 15th; 16th; 17th; 18th; 19th
- Decades: 1620s; 1630s; 1640s; 1650s; 1660s
- See also: Other events of 1645; List of years in Ireland

Events from the year 1645 in Ireland.

== Incumbent ==
- Monarch: Charles I

== Events ==
- Irish Confederate Wars: Lismore town and castle are sacked by a force of the Irish Confederacy commanded by Lord Castlehaven.
- January 20–March 18 – Siege of Duncannon: Confederate general Thomas Preston takes Duncannon.
- April 23 (Saint George's Day) – English Civil War: one hundred and fifty Irish soldiers bound for service with King Charles I of England are captured at sea by Parliamentarians and killed at Pembroke in Wales.
- October 27 – Catholic Bishop Malachy Ó Caollaidhe is killed by Scottish forces during a Confederate expedition to Sligo.
- The Society of Jesus establishes a school in Galway, the predecessor of Coláiste Iognáid.

== Arts and literature ==
- Henry Burkhead's closet drama Cola's Fury, or Lirenda's Misery, based on the Irish Rebellion of 1641, is written.
- John Colgan's Acta Sanctorum Hiberniae is published in Leuven.

== Deaths ==
- Richard III de Bermingham, Anglo-Irish landowner (b. 1570)
- Peter Martin (STP), Dominican.
- Muiris mac Torna Ó Maolconaire, scribe and poet.
