= Mael Ísa Ua Coinne =

Irish lawyer

Mael Ísa Ua Coinne was an iconic Irish lawyer who died in 1126.

A native of what is now County Tyrone, Ua Coinne was at his death regarded as The most learned of the Gaeidhel of Erinn in jurisprudence and in the Ord Patraic.

His surname is now rendered as O'Quinn or Quinn.
