= Zhao Boju =

A Palace by Zhao Boju (c. 1120-c. 1182)

Zhao Boju (Chinese: 赵伯驹; pinyin: Zhào Bójū; 1120–1182), was a Chinese painter during the early Southern Song Dynasty (1127–1279).

Zhao was born in the Hebei provence, and painted landscapes, figures, flowers, fruit and birds. None of his works survive, although some works have been falsely attributed to him, but we know of Zhao through the written descriptions by the art critic Zhao Xigu.
