= Mo Chuaroc moccu Neth Semon =

Mo Chuaroc moccu Neth Semon (fl. c. 600?) was an Irish monk and scholar of the Early Middle Ages.

He was a native of the Youghal area of what is now County Cork in southern Ireland. He studied with Mo Sinu moccu Min and later recorded what the latter taught, which is thought to have been an ordo numerorum, a table of Greek numbers.

== Sources ==
- 1. - MS m, Universitatsbibliothek, Wurzburg; see also below.
- 2. - p. 113, Ireland and her neighbours in the Seventh Century, by Michael Richter.
- 3. - p. 14, "The Irish Tradition", Robin Flower, 1947.
