= Laughlin Ó Cellaigh =

Laughlin Ó Cellaigh, Gaelic-Irish Lord, died 29 June 1646.

== Background ==
Ó Cellaigh was a descendant of the Kings of Uí Maine, and cousin of the last attested king, Feardorcha Ó Cellaigh, (1593 – after 1611). He was the chief of his branch of the dynasty, owning the castles of Mullaghmore, Garbally, Moylough and Castleblakeney in north County Galway.

Laughlin is said to have been the last Ó Cellaigh inhabitant and owner of Moylough Castle. He was regarded as "a chivalrous man", and was kindly remembered in local folklore into the 20th century.

== The Battle of Laught ==
Laughlin's brother, Tadhg Mór, resided a few miles away at Mullaghmore Castle, and was in dispute with Laughlin over possession of their lands and castles.

Tadhg and his followers fought Laughlin and his army at Laught townland on 29 June 1646, during the Irish Confederate Wars, Laughlin been defeated and killed. He was buried in Leacht, with the following epitaph inscribed on his tomb:

"Oh people, who has seen so great a cause of pity since the Three Marys were watching the grave? Full of a castle of noble women. Trusting to one man and he was taken from them."

A second version of the conflict states that:

"Tradition says that at one time a great battle [was fought at Leacht] and many of the inhabitants lost their lives. At one time two chiefs, one from Williamstown and the other from Barnadeag owned all the land from Williamstown and barnadearg as far as Laught. However, they agreed to divide their land and that they should arise early on a certain morning and meet the other and where ever they should meet that would be the boundary."

"The former was very greedy and haughty arose early, gathered an army and set out to meet his enemy. The latter was lazy and did not get up in time. He then set out with his army. Not agreeing with his brother and having the stronger army, he began to drive them back and the Williamstown army fled before the Barnadearg army. They continued their flight until they came to Laught and there they fought a pitched battle. The Williamstown chieftain was killed and was buried behind Boyle's shop. A memorial of stones and morter was erected to mark the place where he was buried.

== Aftermath ==
Laughlin and his brother were first cousins of Tadhg Mór Ó Cellaigh of Aughrim and Tadhg Mór Ó Cellaigh of Castleblakeney. Together with Tadhg Mór Mullaghmore, "They were said to be the three best Tadhgs in Ireland." Several of their descendants were killed during the Battle of Aughrim, Ballinasloe, on 12 July 1691.

The battle of Laught is notable in being one of the last pitched battles to have occurred in County Galway prior to the Irish War of Independence (1919–1922) and the Irish Civil War (1922–1923).
