= First millennium B.C. in Ireland =

- 1st millennium B.C. in Ireland
- Other centuries
- 2nd millennium B.C. | 1st millennium B.C. | 1st millennium

Events from the first millennium BC in Ireland.

== Events ==
- 465 BC – Destruction by fire of a later structure at Emain Macha, according to radiocarbon dating.
- 450 BC – Pseudo-historical date for the foundation of Emain Macha as the capital of the Ulaid kingdom, according to a 12th-century text of Leabhar Gabala.
- 392 BC–201 BC – Murder of Clonycavan Man, according to radiocarbon dating
- 362 BC–175 BC – Murder date of Old Croghan Man, according to radiocarbon dating.
- 307 BC – Pseudo-historical date for the foundation of Emain Macha as the capital of Ulaid kingdom, according to the 8th-century Irish World Chronicle; pseudo-historical date for the destruction of Dind Rig and the foundation of the kingdom of Leinster, according to Leabhar Gabala; dated to 300 BC by Orthanach ua Caellama Cuirrig (d. 840).
- 300 BC – Earliest La Tène influences reach Ireland through trade with and possible migration from the continent.
- 200 BC – Bronze and iron are being used at a crannog at Rathtinaun, Lough Gara, County Sligo; sculptures are being made in stone and wood; creation of the Turoe stone, Bullaun, County Galway.
