= Cow mortality =

Death of domestic cattle

Cow mortality refers to the death of domestic cattle (Bos taurus) commonly attributed to disease, accidents, environmental factors, age, or other causes. Mortality in cows affects agricultural productivity, animal welfare, herd management practices, and farm economics worldwide.

== Overview ==
Cow mortality is a key indicator in livestock health monitoring. It includes unassisted deaths as well as euthanasia when animals are too ill or injured to recover. Mortality rates vary widely depending on species (dairy vs. beef), management system (pasture‑based vs. confined), region, and health practices. In dairy herds, on‑farm mortality is generally higher than in beef herds and tends to be monitored alongside culling rates (removal of animals from the herd due to poor productivity, injury, or illness).

== Mortality rates ==
Average annual mortality rates for adult dairy cows can range from approximately 1% to over 8% depending on the herd and region. In a study of pasture‑based dairy farms in Uruguay, the annual on‑farm mortality rate averaged 4.5%, ranging from 1.1% to 8.1% across individual herds.

Historically, large surveys in the United States have reported dairy cow death rates ranging from about 3% to over 10% in certain regions and time periods, with higher rates often indicating animal welfare concerns.

In some herd studies, nearly half of cows that died did so within the first month after giving birth, often with a large share of deaths occurring in just the first few days postpartum.

== Causes ==
Mortality in cows can be broadly categorized into health‑related, environmental, and accidental causes.

Diseases and health disorders are major contributors to cow mortality. Analysis of necropsy (post‑mortem) records shows that a majority of deaths in dairy cattle are caused by:

- Gastrointestinal diseases (e.g, enteritis/colitis), accounting for around 30–37% of deaths in necropsied herds.
- Respiratory diseases such as pneumonia, causing an estimated 19–20% of fatalities in some studies.
- Reproductive and metabolic problems, including metritis, and related complications.
- Other causes like peritonitis and omphalophlebitis (navel ill).

Large offspring syndrome (LOS) or Abnormal offspring syndrome (AOS), a congenital overgrowth condition, can also occur in cattle, primarily triggered by assisted reproductive technologies, such as cloning, including the use of fetal bovine serum and in-vitro production, but can also spontaneously occur in maternal diets high in urea, causing oversized fetuses and newborns, characterized by epigenetic changes, particularly a loss-of-imprinting disorder similar to Beckwith-Wiedemann syndrome (BWS) in humans, making it an animal model. This involves misregulation of imprinted genes, causing developmental issues in various tissues, leading to macroglossia, macrosomia, enlarged organs (organomegaly), umbilical hernias, omphaloceles, hypoglycemia, ear malformations, and skeletal deformities, as well as the increased risk of birth complications, including stillbirths, neonatal deaths, abortions, dystocia, hypoxia (lack of oxygen), acidosis and difficulty suckling.

Producer‑reported causes in survey data often include lameness or injury, mastitis, and calving problems, reflecting major welfare and management issues on commercial farms.

== Impacts ==
High mortality rates are often considered indicators of welfare problems in livestock systems. They can reflect underlying issues such as insufficient disease control, inadequate shelter, or heat difficulties.

Mortality contributes to economic loss for producers due to the cost of replacing dead animals, reduced productivity, and associated veterinary care expenses.

== See also ==
- Animal welfare
