= Énna Mac Murchada =

- King of Uí Chennselaig, Leinster, and Dublin
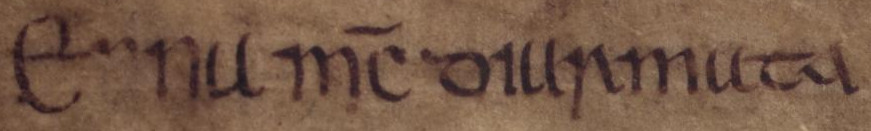
- Énna's name as it appears on folio 36r of Oxford Bodleian Library Rawlinson B 503 (the Annals of Inisfallen): "Enna mc. Diarmata".
- Reign: 1122–1126
- Born: Leinster
- Died: 1126; Wexford
- House: Meic Murchada (Uí Chennselaig)
- Father: Donnchad mac Murchada

Énna Mac Murchada, or Enna Mac Murchada, also known as Énna mac Donnchada, and Énna mac Donnchada mic Murchada, (died 1126) was a twelfth-century ruler of Uí Chennselaig, Leinster, and Dublin. Énna was a member of the Meic Murchada, a branch of the Uí Chennselaig dynasty that came to power in Leinster in the person of his paternal great-grandfather. Énna himself gained power following the death of his cousin Diarmait mac Énna. Throughout much of his reign, Énna acknowledged the overlordship of Toirdelbach Ua Conchobair, King of Connacht, although he participated in a failed revolt against the latter in 1124 before making amends. When Énna died in 1126, Toirdelbach successfully took advantage of the resulting power vacuum.

== Background ==
Énna was a son of Donnchad mac Murchada, King of Leinster. Donnchad had two other sons: one slain in 1115, and another named Diarmait. The men were members of the Uí Chennselaig. In the 1040s, the family seized possession of the provincial kingship of Leinster in the person of the King of Uí Chennselaig, Diarmait mac Máel na mBó, Énna's paternal great-grandfather. Diarmait mac Máel na mBó eventually gained the kingship of Dublin, and further laid claim the high-kingship of Ireland itself. For over a century afterwards the royal rulers of Leinster were regularly drawn from the family. Énna and his immediate family were members of the Meic Murchada, a branch of the Uí Chennselaig descended and named after Diarmait mac Máel na mBó's son, Murchad.

In 1117, the kingship of Uí Chennselaig, Leinster, and Dublin was held by Énna's first cousin, Diarmait mac Énna. When the latter died within the year, Énna succeeded to the kingship of Uí Chennselaig, and Leinster. Unlike other recent Uí Chennselaig monarchs, Énna did not face any serious inter-dynastic opposition to his position.

== Dublin ==
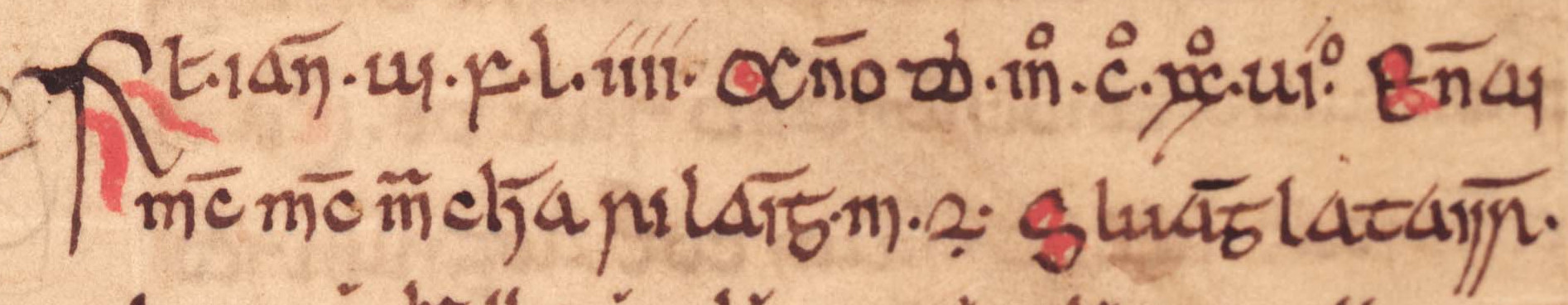
Excerpt from Oxford Bodleian Library Rawlinson B 489 (the Annals of Ulster) concerning Énna's death in 1126. This entry accords Énna a patronym referring to his grandfather, whilst the pictured excerpt from the Annals of Inisfallen refers to Énna's father.

In 1118, Toirdelbach Ua Conchobair, King of Connacht seized the kingship of Dublin, after expelling the reigning Domnall Gerrlámhach Ua Briain, King of Dublin, who appears to have seized control following Diarmait's death the year before.

At some point afterwards, Énna apparently gained the kingship himself, as he is accorded the title rí Laigen ⁊ Gall by the Annals of Ulster in an entry recording his submission to Toirdelbach in 1122. (Note: Énna is similarly styled by the Banshenchas.) Rather than control Dublin directly himself, Toirdelbach appears to have allowed Énna to rule in Dublin as his subordinate. Although the two appear to have generally enjoyed amiable relations, the former participated in a revolt against the latter in 1124, spearheaded by Cormac Mac Cárthaigh, before relations were finally restored, as Toirdelbach travelled to Dublin and is recorded by the Annals of Tigernach to have handed the kingship over to Énna. Énna's reign in Dublin is further evidenced by the record of his gift of the estate of "Realgeallyn" to the Church of the Holy Trinity, Dublin's ecclesiastical centre.

Énna's early death in 1126 is recorded in numerous sources such as the Annals of Inisfallen, the Annals of Tigernach, the Annals of the Four Masters, and the Annals of Ulster. The Book of Leinster further reveals that he died in Wexford. His death there suggests that the Meic Murchada were patronising this Norse-Gaelic enclave, and it appears that this town and Dublin were the primary concentrations of Leinster's wealth.

Toirdelbach seized upon the power vacuum caused by Énna's demise, and the following year installed his own son, Conchobar, as King of Dublin. Toirdelbach also invaded the core territory of the Uí Chennselaig, and deposed an unnamed Meic Murchada, before installing Conchobar as king. The aforesaid Meic Murchada may well have been Máel Sechlainn mac Diarmata, a first cousin once removed of Énna. Another possibility, however, is that the unnamed Meic Murchada was Énna's aforesaid younger brother, Diarmait, an apparent rival of Máel Sechlainn.

== Ancestry ==
Ancestors of Énna Mac Murchada

16. Donnchad mac Diarmata (died 1006).
8. Diarmait mac Máel na mBó, King of Leinster (died 1072)
18. Aífe ingen Gilla Pátraic
4. Murchad mac Diarmata, King of Dublin and the Isles (died 1070)
2. Donnchad mac Murchada, King of Leinster (died 1115)
1. Énna Mac Murchada (died 1126)

== Citations ==
Énna Mac Murchada Meic Murchada Cadet branch of the Uí Chennselaig
Regnal titles
| Preceded by Diarmait mac Énna | King of Uí Chennselaig ×1117–1126 | Unknown |
| Preceded by Diarmait mac Énna | King of Leinster ×1117–1126 | Unknown |
| Preceded by Toirdelbach Ua Conchobair | King of Dublin ×1122–1126 | Succeeded by Conchobar Ua Conchobair |
