= Branan =

Branan is a surname. Notable people with the surname include:

- Brett Branan (born 1983), American soccer player
- Cliff Branan (born 1961), American politician
- Cory Branan (born 1974), American singer-songwriter
- Dustin Branan (born 1981), American soccer player
