= Gilla na Naomh Ua hEidhin =

Gilla na Naomh Ua hEidhin was King of Uí Fiachrach Aidhne until his death in 1100.

Gilla na Naomh was the third Ua hEidhin king to rule Aidhne, and was king for sixty-two years, one of the longest in attested Irish history.

In 1055 he killed Domnhall Ruadh Ua Briain in unexplained circumstances. In 1067 the battle of Turlach Adhnaigh occurred in his territory. The Annals of the Four Masters make the following note of it:

The battle of Turlach Adhnaigh, between Áed in Gai Bernaig, King of Connaught, and Aedh, the son of Art Uallach Ua Ruairc, and the men of Breifne along with him; where fell Áed in Gai Bernaig, King of the province of Connaught, the helmsman of the valour of Leath-Chuinn; and the chiefs of Connaught fell along with him, and, among the rest, Aedh Ua Con Ceanainn, lord of Uí Díarmata, and many others. It was to commemorate the death of Aedh Ua Conchobhair this quatrain was composed:"Seven years, seventy, not a short period/And a thousand, great the victory/From the birth of Christ/not false the jurisdiction/Till the fall of Aedh, King of Connaught."

The same source records another battle in Aidhne in 1094.

A battle was gained by Tadhg, son of Ruaidhri Ua Conchobhair, and the Sil-Muireadhaigh, over the people of Thomond and West Connaught, in which three hundred were slain; and they plundered all West Connaught. This was called the battle of Fidhnacha. Of the chieftains who were slain in this battle were Amhlaeibh Ua hAichir, Donnsleibhe Ua Cinnfhaelaidh, and the son of Gillafursa Ua Maelmhuaidh.

Gilla na Naomh died in 1100 and was buried in Clonmacnoise.

Preceded by Mael Fabhaill Ua hEidhin	King of Uí Fiachrach Aidhne; 1048-1100	Succeeded by Aodh Ua hEidhin
