= Aodh Ua hEidhin =

Aodh Ua hEidhin (died 1121) was King of Uí Fiachrach Aidhne.

According to the Annals of the Four Masters, sub anno 1121:

A hosting by Toirdhealbhach son of Ruaidhrí into Munster, and he burned Ciarraighe Luachra and went from there eastwards through Munster, and burned Ua Caoimh's house on the bank of the Abha Mhór, and his scouts came to Magh Ceithniuil and Druim Fínghin. On that day were killed Muireadhach Ua Flaithbheartaigh, king of Iarthar Connacht, and Aodh Ua hEidhin, king of Uí Fhiachrach Aidhne, to avenge the profanation of Mo-Chuda, although Toirdhealbhach made compensation for the plundering. An encampment by Toirdhealbhach son of Ruaidhrí at Magh Biorra during the winter, and he made a settlement between Clann Charthaigh and Síol Briain, and they both submitted to him.

Preceded by Gilla na Naomh Ua hEidhin	King of Uí Fiachrach Aidhne; 1100–1121	Succeeded by Gilla Mo Choinni Ua Cathail
