= 2nd century in Ireland =

Events from the 2nd century in Ireland.

== 100s ==
106

- Battle of Moin An Chatha, in Magh Line, Dal Araidhe

== 140s ==
140

- Greek astronomer and cartographer Ptolemy provided the earliest known reference to human habitation in the area now known as Dublin. In around 140 he referred to a settlement he called Eblana Civitas

== 150s ==
157

- Battle of Tuath Amrois

== Notes ==
- List of Published Texts at CELT — University College Cork's Corpus of Electronic Texts project has the full list of Irish Annals.
