= Château de Morimont =

Ruined castle in the Alsace region of France

Coordinates: 47°26′43″N 7°12′51″E

The Château de Morimont (German: Moersberg) is a ruined castle in the Alsace region of France, in the commune of Oberlarg in the Haut-Rhin département. It is 40 km southwest of Mulhouse and 45 km west of the Swiss city of Basel.

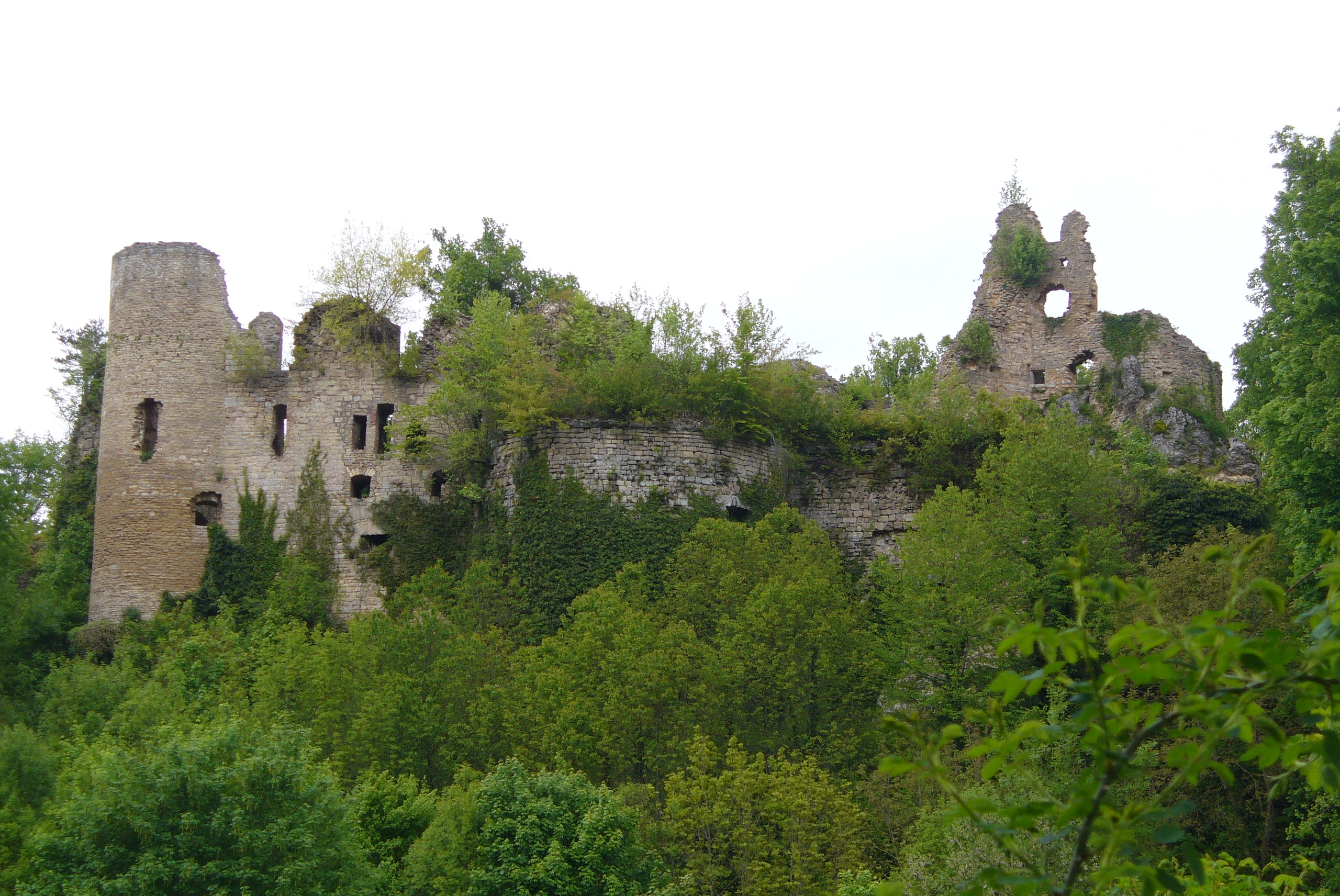
Morimont castle ruins in Alsace

== History ==
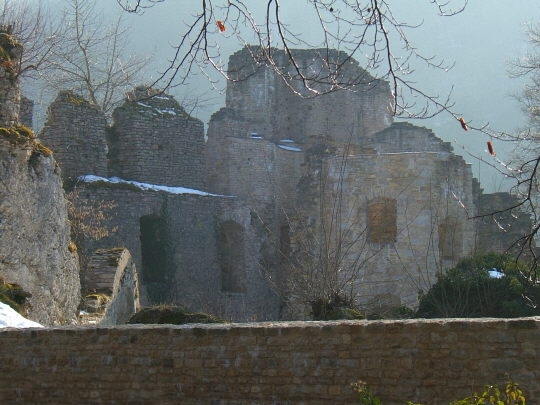
Château de Morimont ruins

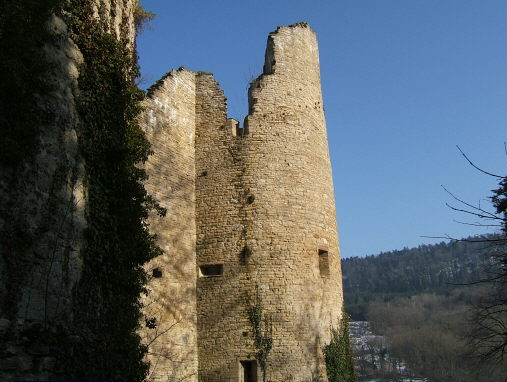
Château de Morimont tower

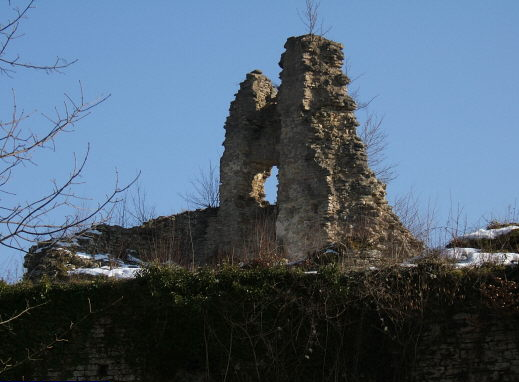
Ruined keep of Château de Morimont

The first documented mention of the castle is from 1271, when the Count of Ferrette made an oblation to the bishop of Basel. It was occupied by, and takes its name from, the Morimont family, vassals of the Ferrettes, and later the Habsburgs. A war with Basel and the Swiss led to the castle's destruction some time between 1445 and 1468. It was rebuilt by the Morimonts in the 15th and 16th centuries with seven artillery towers. In 1582 they sold it to the Counts of Ortenbourg Salamanque who kept it until the Thirty Years' War, during which it was destroyed by French troops in 1637. In 1641, Louis XIV gave it and the manor to the Vignacourts, who stayed until the French Revolution. It subsequently belonged to Jean Bruat, then Aaron Meyer, and, from 1870, the Viellard family.

== Architecture ==
Built on a rocky east-west crest, the castle dominates the route between Oberlag and Levoncourt. It is constructed from Jurassic limestone with a lime mortar. The northern building, measuring 51 by 7.5 m (~170 by 25 ft), has an underground semicircular vaulted cellar running its full length, and the remains of two spiral staircases. The southern building consists of a polygonal staircase tower and the remains of pointed-arch vaulting and a fireplace. The tower in the northwest corner has oven-shaped vaulting. The southern artillery tower has three vaulted casemates whose cannon openings are set to fire horizontally, with one covering the entrance. The northeast tower, built in 1515, has been restored, and the present entrance to the cellar through the curtain wall is not original.

The oldest part of the present castle — a U-shaped tower in the southern corner — dates from the 13th or 14th century. Referred to by most authors as a keep, it was built onto the bare rock and provided the first residential quarters. The southwest Schlossturm Tower dates from the 15th century, as do part of the west and south curtain walls. In the north, the great hall of 1552, on the probable site of the former lower courtyard, is flanked by two large artillery towers; the northeast tower, dated 1515, carries the arms of Hans Jacob de Morimont and his wife Margarete de Furtenberg. In the south, there was a second residence of which a staircase tower remains. The castle entrance was defended by a low casemated tower and a barbican. In the middle of the west wall is a tower with wells.

The adaptation of the castle to artillery warfare was modern in conception but with little military value, as the site was dominated from three sides by high ground. Its Renaissance form, particularly early for Alsace, is explained by the Morimonts' close links to France.

The castle was used as a quarry until its restoration by Quiquerez starting in 1864.

A 1361 document refers to a lower castle ("Bas Morimont") and a higher castle ("Haut Morimont"). The former is located at the present Morimont farm to the west. Very little of it remains; dated to perhaps the 12th or 13th century, it was destroyed by the 15th century at the latest, and is not mentioned after 1423.

The Château de Morimont and the neighbouring smaller castle ruins have been listed as historical monuments (monument historique) by the French Ministry of Culture since 1841.

== See also ==
- List of castles in France
