= 1131 in Ireland =

- Centuries: 11th; 12th; 13th; 14th
- Decades: 1110s; 1120s; 1130s; 1140s; 1150s
- See also: Other events of 1131; List of years in Ireland

Events from the year 1131 in Ireland.

== Incumbents ==
- High King: Tairrdelbach Ua Conchobair

== Events ==
- The Book of Glendalough was written in Glendalough.
