= Mo Sinu moccu Min =

Irish scholar (died 610)

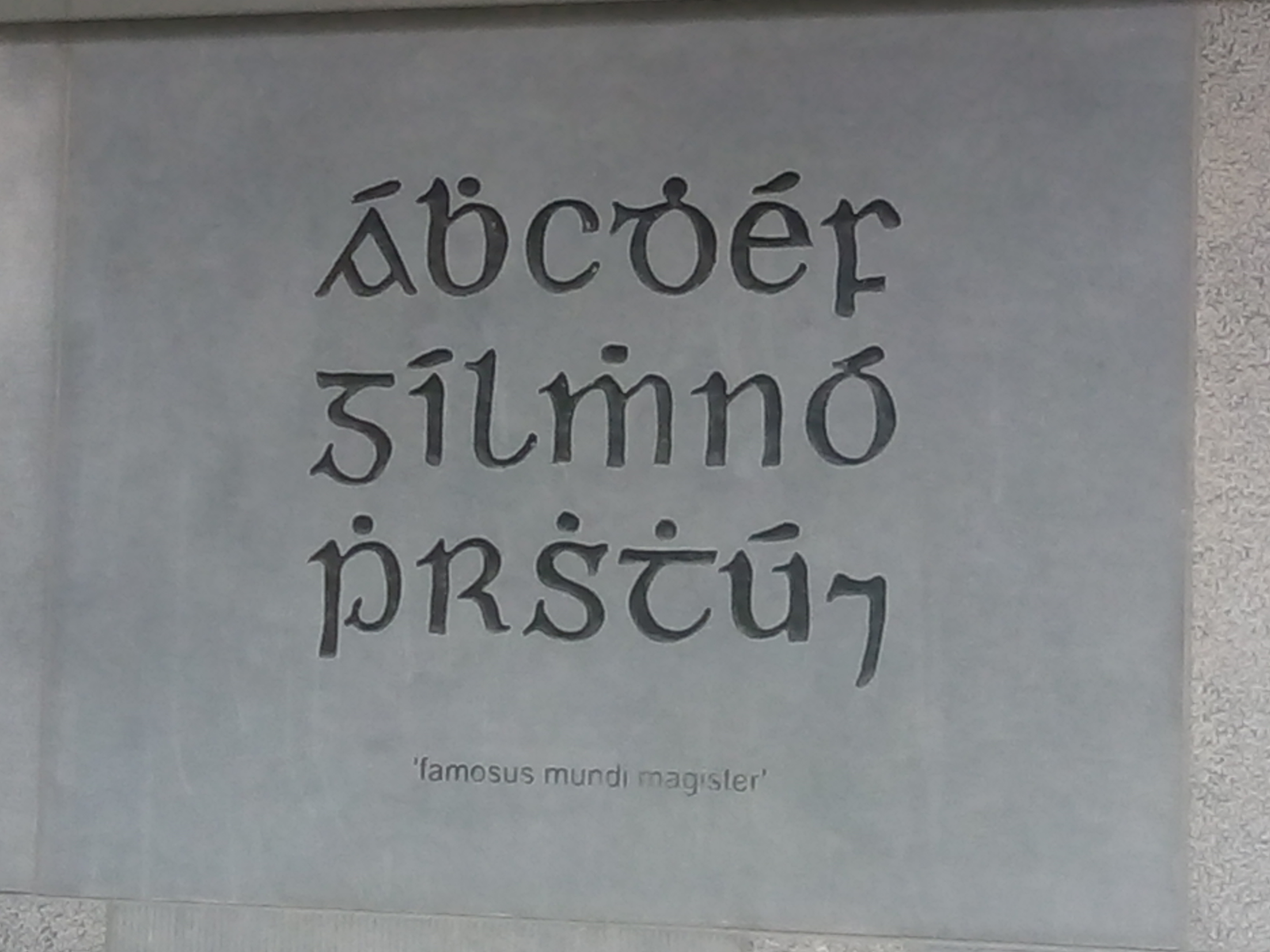
Inscription on a building in Dublin, honouring Sinlan as famosus magister mundi ("famous teacher of the world")

Mo Sinu moccu Min, also known as Sinilis, Sinlán Moccu Mín (died 610) was an Irish scholar.

Fifth abbot of Bangor, "Mo-Sinu maccu Min ... was the first of the Hibernenses who learned the computus by heart from a certain Greek. Afterwards, Mo-Chuoróc maccu Neth Sémon, whom the Romani styled doctor of the whole world, and a pupil of the aforesaid scholar, in the island called Crannach of Duin Lethglaisse (Downpatrick), committed this knowledge to writing, lest it should fade from memory." This computus is thought to have been an oro numerorum.

It is thought that he is identical to the Sinilis who tutored Columbanus, according to Jonas of Bobbio. If so, he would have taught Columbanus in the years prior to his departure to France about 585.

Robin Flower wrote of him that "It is clear that particular attention was paid to historical studies at Bangor, and the earliest Irish chronicle was probably a production of that house. It has been attributed with good reason to Sinlán Moccu Mín, that Sinlanus who is described in the list of abbots in the Antiphonary of Bangor as the 'famed teacher of the world.'" Flower also suggested that he was the teacher in the monastic school of Bangor on Cranny Island in Strangford Lough, and that the chronicle, like the computus, "was compiled under his supervision rather than actually written in his own hands."
