= 1130 in Ireland =

- Centuries: 11th; 12th; 13th; 14th
- Decades: 1110s; 1120s; 1130s; 1140s; 1150s
- See also: Other events of 1130; List of years in Ireland

Events from the year 1130 in Ireland.

== Incumbents ==
- High King: Toirdelbach Ua Conchobair

== Births ==
- Richard de Clare, 2nd Earl of Pembroke (a.k.a. Strongbow), who led the Norman invasion of Ireland (died 1176).
