= Diarmait Ua Briain =

Diarmait Ua Briain (c. 1060 –1118) was an 11th-century Irish king who ruled Munster from 1114 to 1118.

One of three sons of Toirdelbach Ua Briain, he was banished from Munster by his brother Muirchertach Ua Briain shortly after the death of their father in 1086. He lived in exile for several years while his brother ruled as King of Munster. He is believed to have been the commander of the Irish fleet that supported Rhys ap Tewdwr at the Battle of Mynydd Carn.

In 1093, he reconciled with Muirchertach after recognizing his claim and was installed as dux of Waterford. He eventually succeeded his brother as acting King of Munster when his brother became seriously ill in 1114. After taking the throne, he banished Muircheartach and soon was involved in a four-year struggle for control of Munster. In 1116, he attacked Muirchertach and Brian Ua Briain "in violation of a mutual oath on the relics of Ireland" besieging Limerick. This resulted in Muirchertach making peace with Diarmait but he was eventually captured by Muircheartach.

He later died in Cork in 1118 and in the same year, Toirdelbach Ua Conchobair invaded Munster and partitioned the land between the sons of Diarmait Ua Briain and Tadg Mac Carthaig, Conchobar Ua Briain of Thomond and Toirdelbach Mac Carthaig of Desmond respectively.

== Family ==
He married Mór Ua Conchobair, daughter of Ruaidrí Ua Conchobair [(anglicised Roderic O'Connor), called Ruaidrí na Saide Buide], King of Connacht (died 1118) and had two sons:

- Tadc (Tadhg) (died 1154)
- Toirdhealbhach (died 1167)

He had two other sons by unknown wives or mistresses:

- Cochobhar na Cathrach (died 1142)
- Donnchad, Bishop of Killaloe (died 1164)

Diarmait Ua Briain Dál gCais
Regnal titles
Preceded by Muircheartach Ua Briain	King of Munster; 1114–1118	Succeeded by Conchobar Ua Briain and Toirdelbach Mac Carthaig
