= 1104 in Ireland =

- Centuries: 11th; 12th; 13th; 14th
- Decades: 1100s; 1110s; 1120s
- See also: Other events of 1104; List of years in Ireland

Events from the year 1104 in Ireland.

== Incumbents ==
- High King of Ireland: Domnall Ua Lochlainn

== Events ==
- Dál nAraidi forces defeat the sons of Eochaid mac Duinn Sléibe King of Ulster.

== Deaths ==
- Eataine Ní Egrai
