= Diarmait mac Énna meic Murchada =

Diarmait mac Énna
- King of Leinster and Dublin
- Died: 1117; Dublin
- Dynasty: Uí Cheinnselaig
- Father: Énna mac Murchada

Diarmait mac Énna meic Murchada (died 1117) was an early twelfth-century ruler of the kingdoms of Leinster and Dublin.

== Background ==
Diarmait was a member of the Uí Chennselaig, and son of Énna mac Murchada.

== Kingship and death ==
In 1115, Donnchad mac Murchada and Conchobar Ua Conchobair Failge, co-kings of Leinster, seized upon the faltering power of the Uí Briain controlled Kingdom of Munster, and launched an attack upon the Kingdom of Dublin. The Dubliners, however, led by the Uí Briain dynast Domnall Gerrlámhach, repulsed the invasion, and slew both Donnchad and Conchobar.

The kingship of Leinster thereupon fell to Diarmait himself, who soon after seized control of Dublin, before dying there in 1117. After his death, Domnall Gerrlámhach retook the kingship of Dublin; and Énna Mac Murchada, an Uí Chennselaig kinsman of Diarmait, was elected King of Leinster.
