= 1106 in Ireland =

- Centuries: 11th; 12th; 13th; 14th
- Decades: 1100s; 1110s; 1120s
- See also: Other events of 1106; List of years in Ireland

Events from the year 1106 in Ireland.

== Incumbents ==
- High King of Ireland: Domnall Ua Lochlainn

== Events ==
- Turlough O’Connor becomes King of Connacht and claimant to the High Kingship of Ireland, reigning until 1156.

== Deaths ==
- Máel Muire mac Céilechair, cleric and scribe at the monastery of Clonmacnoise.
