= 1134 in Ireland =

- Centuries: 11th; 12th; 13th; 14th
- Decades: 1110s; 1120s; 1130s; 1140s; 1150s
- See also: Other events of 1134; List of years in Ireland

Events from the year 1134 in Ireland.

== Incumbents ==
- High King: Toirdelbach Ua Conchobair

== Events ==
- Consecration of Cormac’s Chapel at Cashel Building had started in 1127. It had been built by Cormac mac Carthaig, King of Munster and consecrated in the presence of a great assembly of church and royal dignitaries.
