= 1105 in Ireland =

- Centuries: 11th; 12th; 13th; 14th
- Decades: 1100s; 1110s; 1120s
- See also: Other events of 1105; List of years in Ireland

Events from the year 1105 in Ireland.

== Incumbents ==
- High King of Ireland: Domnall Ua Lochlainn

== Events ==
- Cellach Ua Sinaig inherits the position of Abbot of Armagh (the seventh in a series of members of the Ua Sinaig family, who had held the position without taking holy orders, and several of whom had been married).

== Deaths ==
- Muirgheas Ua Cú Ceannainn, King of Uí Díarmata.
