= 1132 in Ireland =

- Centuries: 11th; 12th; 13th; 14th
- Decades: 1110s; 1120s; 1130s; 1140s; 1150s
- See also: Other events of 1132; List of years in Ireland

Events from the year 1132 in Ireland.

== Incumbents ==
- High King of Ireland: Toirdelbach Ua Conchobair

== Events ==
- Summer – Conchobhair O Brian of Thomond makes a marauding raid on Uí Maine and besieges Galway.
- Malachy, Bishop of Down and of Connor, is appointed Archbishop of Armagh.

== Deaths ==
- Conchobhar Ua Flaithbheartaigh, king of Iar Connacht
