= Alina Martain =

French Benedictine nun (d. 1125)

Alina Martain (died 1125) was a French Benedictine nun and Catholic saint.

Martain was born in the late 11th century. She became a Benedictine nun at an early age. In 1105, Count William of Mortain built a convent of which Alina became the first superior. After a life of asceticism and voluntary mortification, her feast day is October 20.

She does not appear in the index of the 2004 edition of the Roman Martyrology.
