= 1139 in Ireland =

- Centuries: 11th; 12th; 13th; 14th
- Decades: 1110s; 1120s; 1130s; 1140s; 1150s
- See also: Other events of 1139; List of years in Ireland

Events from the year 1139 in Ireland.

== Incumbents ==
- High King: Toirdelbach Ua Conchobair

== Events ==
- Early – Malachy, Bishop of Down, begins his first journey to Rome, via Scotland, England, and France, visiting Bernard of Clairvaux. He petitions Pope Innocent II for pallia for the Sees of Armagh and Cashel, and is appointed native legate for Ireland.
- Malachy gives the previously Benedictine St. Mary's Abbey, Dublin, to monks of the Congregation of Savigny.
- Course of River Suck diverted by Tairrdelbach Ua Conchobair, King of Connacht.

== Deaths ==
- Cú Connacht Ua Dálaigh, poet.
- David Scotus, chronicler.
