= 1138 in Ireland =

- Centuries: 11th; 12th; 13th; 14th
- Decades: 1110s; 1120s; 1130s; 1140s; 1150s
- See also: Other events of 1138; List of years in Ireland

Events from the year 1138 in Ireland.

== Incumbents ==
- High King: Toirdelbach Ua Conchobair

== Deaths ==
- Cormac Mac Cárthaigh, King of Munster.
