= 1120 =

1120 in various calendars
- Gregorian calendar: 1120; MCXX
- Ab urbe condita: 1873
- Armenian calendar: 569; ԹՎ ՇԿԹ
- Assyrian calendar: 5870
- Balinese saka calendar: 1041–1042
- Bengali calendar: 526–527
- Berber calendar: 2070
- English Regnal year: 20 Hen. 1 – 21 Hen. 1
- Buddhist calendar: 1664
- Burmese calendar: 482
- Byzantine calendar: 6628–6629
- Chinese calendar: 己亥年 (Earth Pig); 3817 or 3610 — to — 庚子年 (Metal Rat); 3818 or 3611
- Coptic calendar: 836–837
- Discordian calendar: 2286
- Ethiopian calendar: 1112–1113
- Hebrew calendar: 4880–4881
- Hindu calendars
- Vikram Samvat: 1176–1177
- Shaka Samvat: 1041–1042
- Kali Yuga: 4220–4221
- Holocene calendar: 11120
- Igbo calendar: 120–121
- Iranian calendar: 498–499
- Islamic calendar: 513–514
- Japanese calendar: Gen'ei 3 / Hōan 1 (保安元年)
- Javanese calendar: 1025–1026
- Julian calendar: 1120; MCXX
- Korean calendar: 3453
- Minguo calendar: 792 before ROC 民前792年
- Nanakshahi calendar: −348
- Seleucid era: 1431/1432 AG
- Thai solar calendar: 1662–1663
- Tibetan calendar: ས་མོ་ཕག་ལོ་ (female Earth-Boar); 1246 or 865 or 93 — to — ལྕགས་ཕོ་བྱི་བ་ལོ་ (male Iron-Rat); 1247 or 866 or 94

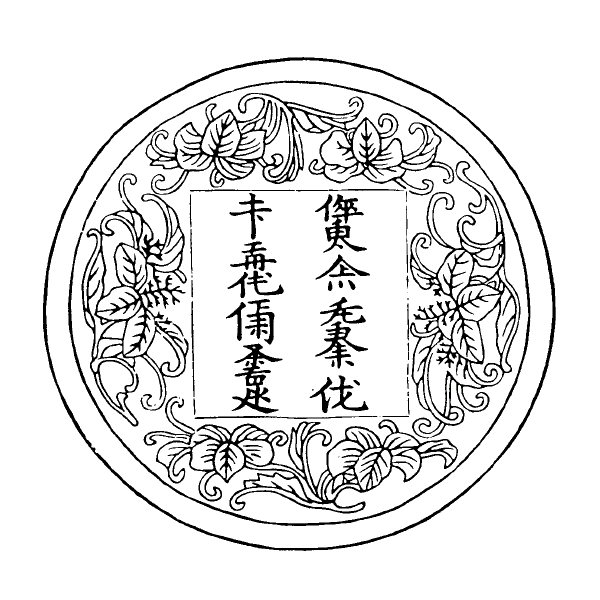
Jurchen translation of the Chinese couplet, Ming wang shen de, si yi xian bin ("明王慎德.四夷咸宾": "When a wise king is heedful of virtue, foreigners from all quarters come as guests")

Year 1120 (MCXX) was a leap year starting on Thursday of the Julian calendar.

== Events ==
=== By place ===
==== Byzantine Empire ====
- Siege of Sozopolis: Byzantine forces under Emperor John II Komnenos conquer Sozopolis in Pisidia, from the Sultanate of Rum. The Seljuk garrison is defeated while they are trapped between the Byzantine cavalry and the army (which is besieging the fortress).

==== Levant ====
- January 16 – Council of Nablus: King Baldwin II of Jerusalem and Patriarch Warmund convenes an assembly at Nablus, establishing the earliest surviving written laws of the Crusader Kingdom of Jerusalem. The prelates and noblemen who attend the meeting confirm the clergy's right to collect the tithe and to bear arms "in the cause of defense".
- Baldwin II grants the Knights Templar under Hugues de Payens and Godfrey de Saint-Omer a headquarters in a wing of the royal palace on the Temple Mount in the captured Al-Aqsa Mosque in the Old City of Jerusalem.
- Summer – Baldwin II leads an expedition to Antioch to defend the northern Crusader states. He signs a 1-year truce with Ilghazi, Artuqid ruler of Mardin, securing the possession of Kafartab and other fortresses in Syria.

==== Europe ====
- June 17 – Reconquista: Battle of Cutanda: The combined forces of Aragon and Navarre under King Alfonso the Battler crush the Almoravid army near Calamocha. Alfonso recaptures the fortified towns of Calatayud and Daroca.
- The Almoravid fleet under Admirals Abu Abd Allah ibn Maymum of Almería and Isa ibn Maymum of Sevilla attacks the coastline of the Christian Kingdom of Galicia.
- Freiburg is founded by Conrad I and his elder brother, Duke Berthold III of Zähringen, as a free market town.

==== England ====
- King Henry I gives a portion of the Stoneleigh estate (located in Warwickshire) to Geoffrey de Clinton, his chamberlain and treasurer. He builds a motte and bailey castle and forms a lake to provide better defences.
- November 25 – The White Ship sinks in the English Channel off Barfleur. Henry I's only legitimate son, William Adelin, is among 300 (many of them Anglo-Norman nobility) who drown.
- The Pseudo-Ingulf's Croyland Chronicle records Cornwall as a nation distinct from England.

==== Asia ====
- Fang La, a Chinese rebel leader, leads an uprising against the Song dynasty in Qixian Village (modern-day Zhejiang) in southeast China. He raises an army and captures Hangzhou.
- August–September (the eighth month of the Chinese calendar) – Wanyan Xiyin, a Jurchen nobleman and minister, completes the design of the first version of the Jurchen script.
- The flourishing south Chinese coastal city of Quanzhou claims a population of 500,000 citizens, including the hinterland.

=== By topic ===
==== Religion ====
- Order of Premonstratensians founded by Norbert of Xanten at Prémontré in Picardy.
- Bishop Urban begins the construction on Llandaff Cathedral in Wales.

==== Science ====
- Walcher of Malvern, an English astronomer and mathematician, creates a system of measurement for the Earth using degrees, minutes and seconds of latitude and longitude.

== Births ==
- Alfonso of Capua, Italo-Norman nobleman (d. 1144)
- Arnold I of Vaucourt, archbishop of Trier (d. 1183)
- Frederick II of Berg, archbishop of Cologne (d. 1158)
- Fujiwara no Yorinaga, Japanese statesman (d. 1156)
- Gonçalo Mendes de Sousa, Portuguese

nobleman (d. 1190)

- Gunhilda of Dunbar, Scottish Noblewoman (d. 1166)
- Ioveta of Bethany, princess and daughter of Baldwin II
- Jaksa Gryfita, Polish nobleman and knight (d. 1176)
- Judah ben Saul ibn Tibbon, Arab-Jewish translator
- Louis VII (le Jeune), king of France (d. 1180)
- Philip of Milly, French nobleman and knight (d. 1171)
- Rainald of Dassel, archbishop of Cologne (d. 1167)
- Roger de Mowbray, English nobleman (d. 1188)
- Urban III, pope of the Catholic Church (d. 1187)
- William I ("the Wicked"), king of Sicily (d. 1166)
- Zhao Boju, Chinese landscape painter (d. 1182)

== Deaths ==
- September 3 – Blessed Gerard, founder of the Knights Hospitaller
- September 24 – Welf II ("the Fat"), duke of Bavaria (b. 1072)
- November 25
  - Matilda FitzRoy, countess and daughter of Henry I
  - Ralph of Pont-Echanfray, Norman knight (b. 1070)
  - Richard d'Avranches, 2nd Earl of Chester (b. 1094)
  - William Adelin, duke and son of Henry I (b. 1103)
- Adelaide, countess of Vermandois and Valois (or 1124)
- Afridun I (the Martyr), ruler (shah) of Shirvan (b. 1046)
- Eudo Dapifer (or FitzHerbert), Norman nobleman
- Fujiwara no Atsutaka, Japanese nobleman and poet
- Fujiwara no Sadazane, Japanese calligrapher (b. 1076)
- Ingegerd, queen of Denmark and Sweden (b. 1046)
- Raymond Pilet d'Alès, French nobleman (b. 1075)
