= 1098 =

1098 in various calendars
- Gregorian calendar: 1098; MXCVIII
- Ab urbe condita: 1851
- Armenian calendar: 547; ԹՎ ՇԽԷ
- Assyrian calendar: 5848
- Balinese saka calendar: 1019–1020
- Bengali calendar: 504–505
- Berber calendar: 2048
- English Regnal year: 11 Will. 2 – 12 Will. 2
- Buddhist calendar: 1642
- Burmese calendar: 460
- Byzantine calendar: 6606–6607
- Chinese calendar: 丁丑年 (Fire Ox); 3795 or 3588 — to — 戊寅年 (Earth Tiger); 3796 or 3589
- Coptic calendar: 814–815
- Discordian calendar: 2264
- Ethiopian calendar: 1090–1091
- Hebrew calendar: 4858–4859
- Hindu calendars
- Vikram Samvat: 1154–1155
- Shaka Samvat: 1019–1020
- Kali Yuga: 4198–4199
- Holocene calendar: 11098
- Igbo calendar: 98–99
- Iranian calendar: 476–477
- Islamic calendar: 491–492
- Japanese calendar: Jōtoku 2 (承徳２年)
- Javanese calendar: 1002–1003
- Julian calendar: 1098; MXCVIII
- Korean calendar: 3431
- Minguo calendar: 814 before ROC 民前814年
- Nanakshahi calendar: −370
- Seleucid era: 1409/1410 AG
- Thai solar calendar: 1640–1641
- Tibetan calendar: མེ་མོ་གླང་ལོ་ (female Fire-Ox); 1224 or 843 or 71 — to — ས་ཕོ་སྟག་ལོ་ (male Earth-Tiger); 1225 or 844 or 72

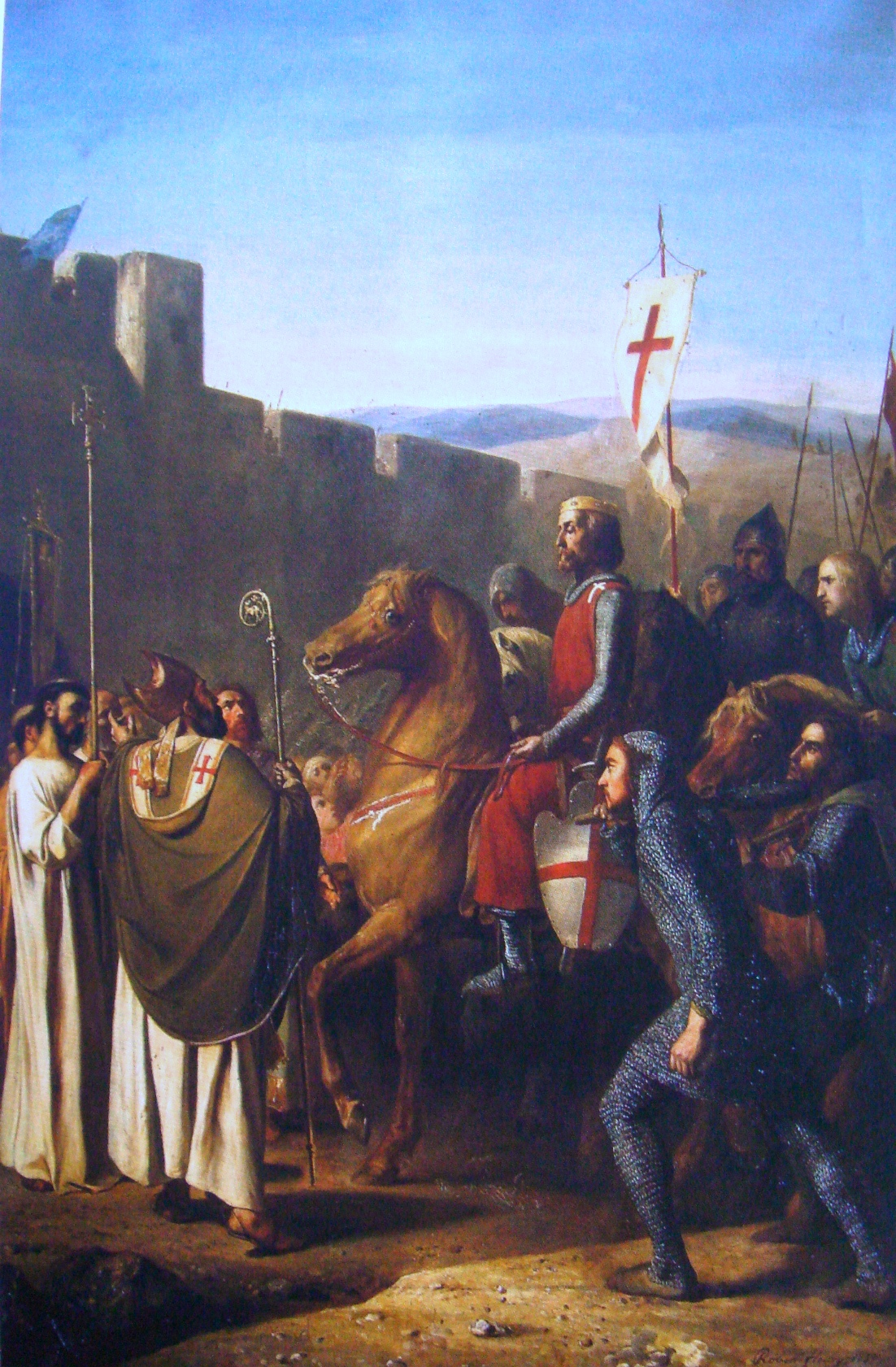
Baldwin of Boulogne entering Edessa.

Year 1098 (MXCVIII) was a common year starting on Friday of the Julian calendar.

== Events ==
=== By place ===
==== First Crusade ====
- February 9 – Battle of the Lake of Antioch: The Crusaders under Bohemond I defeat a Seljuk relief force (some 12,000 men) led by Sultan Fakhr al-Mulk Radwan of Aleppo. Bohemond gathers 700 knights, and marches in the night to ambush the Seljuk Turks at the Lake of Antioch (modern Turkey). After several successful cavalry charges the Crusaders rout the Seljuk army, forcing Radwan to retreat to Aleppo.
- March 10 – Baldwin of Boulogne enters Edessa, and is welcomed as liberator by the Armenian clergy. The local population massacres the Seljuk garrison and officials – or forces them to flee. Baldwin is acknowledged as their ruler (or doux). He assumes the title of count and establishes the first crusader state. Baldwin marries Arda, daughter of a local Armenian ruler, and consolidates his conquered territory.
- June 3 – Siege of Antioch: The Crusaders under Bohemond I capture Antioch after a 8-month siege. He established secret contact with Firouz, an Armenian guard who controlled the "Tower of the Two Sisters". He opened the gates and Bohemond entered the city. Thousands of Christians are massacred along with Muslims. Bohemond is named Prince of Antioch (under protest) and creates the Principality of Antioch.
- June 5 – Battle of Antioch: Emir Kerbogha, ruler (atabeg) of Mosul, arrives at Antioch with a Seljuk army (35,000 men) to relieve the city. He lays siege to the Crusaders who have just captured the city themselves (although they do not have full control of it). A Byzantine relief force led by Emperor Alexios I Komnenos turns back after Count Stephen of Blois convinces them that the situation in Antioch is hopeless.
- June 28 – Following the Holy Lance discovery by Peter Bartholomew in Antioch, the Crusaders under Bohemond I (leaving only 200 men) sortie from the city and defeat the Seljuk army. Kerbogha is forced to withdraw to Mosul, the garrison in the citadel surrenders to Bohemond personally (who raises his banner above the city) and the Crusaders occupy Antioch. The Crusade is delayed for the rest of the year.
- July 14 – Donation of Altavilla: Bohemond I grants commercial privileges and the right to use warehouses (fondaco) to the Republic of Genoa. This marks the beginning of Italian merchant settlements in the Levant.
- August 1 – Adhemar of Le Puy (or Aimar), French bishop and nominal leader of the First Crusade, dies during an epidemic (probably typhus). With this, Rome's direct control over the Crusade effectively ends.
- August – Fatimid forces under Caliph Al-Musta'li recapture Jerusalem and occupy Palestine. The Crusaders threaten the borders of the Fatimid Caliphate which already has lost the Emirate of Sicily (see 1091).
- December 12 – Siege of Ma'arra: The Crusaders capture the city of Ma'arra after a month's siege and massacre part of the population. Short of supplies, the army is accused of widespread cannibalism.

==== Britain ====
- June or July – Battle of Anglesey Sound: A Norwegian fleet led by King Magnus Barefoot reverses an Anglo-Norman invasion of North Wales. Magnus conquers the Orkney Islands, the Hebrides and the Isle of Man.
- King Edgar of Scotland signs a treaty with Magnus III in which he agrees that the northern territories including the Hebrides belong to Norway. At Dunfermline Abbey, Edgar seeks support from Anselm of Canterbury.

=== By topic ===
==== Religion ====
- March 21 – Cîteaux Abbey, located in Saint-Nicolas-lès-Cîteaux, is founded by Robert of Molesme, founder of the Cistercian Order.
- October – The Council of Bari presided by Pope Urban II discusses relations between the Western and the Eastern Church.

== Births ==
- Amadeus I, Swiss nobleman (House of Geneva) (d. 1178)
- Ayn al-Quzat Hamadani, Persian philosopher and poet (d. 1131)
- Hedwig of Gudensberg, German countess and regent (d. 1148)
- Hildegard of Bingen, German Benedictine abbess (d. 1179)
- John of the Grating, French bishop and saint (d. 1163)
- Pons, French nobleman (House of Toulouse) (d. 1137)
- Simon II de Senlis, Earl of Huntingdon-Northampton, Anglo-Norman nobleman (d. 1153)
- Wibald, German abbot and councillor (d. 1158)

== Deaths ==
- January 3 – Walkelin, Norman bishop of Winchester
- February 22 – Hugh de Grandmesnil, Norman sheriff (b. 1032)
- July 31 – Hugh of Montgomery, 2nd Earl of Shrewsbury
- August 1 – Adhemar of Le Puy, French bishop (b. 1045)
- Alan the Black, Norman nobleman and lord of Richmond
- Baldwin II, count of Hainaut (House of Flanders) (b. 1056)
- Ephraim of the Caves, Kievan bishop of Pereiaslav
- Raymond IV (Raimundus), count of Pallars Jussà
- Robert de Say (Fitz-Picot), Norman nobleman
- Vinayaditya, Indian king of the Hoysala Empire
- Walo II of Chaumont-en-Vexin (or Galon II de Beaumont), viscount and constable of France (b. 1060)
- Yaghi Siyan, Seljuk governor of Antioch (b. 1011)
