= 1125 =

1125 in various calendars
- Gregorian calendar: 1125; MCXXV
- Ab urbe condita: 1878
- Armenian calendar: 574; ԹՎ ՇՀԴ
- Assyrian calendar: 5875
- Balinese saka calendar: 1046–1047
- Bengali calendar: 531–532
- Berber calendar: 2075
- English Regnal year: 25 Hen. 1 – 26 Hen. 1
- Buddhist calendar: 1669
- Burmese calendar: 487
- Byzantine calendar: 6633–6634
- Chinese calendar: 甲辰年 (Wood Dragon); 3822 or 3615 — to — 乙巳年 (Wood Snake); 3823 or 3616
- Coptic calendar: 841–842
- Discordian calendar: 2291
- Ethiopian calendar: 1117–1118
- Hebrew calendar: 4885–4886
- Hindu calendars
- Vikram Samvat: 1181–1182
- Shaka Samvat: 1046–1047
- Kali Yuga: 4225–4226
- Holocene calendar: 11125
- Igbo calendar: 125–126
- Iranian calendar: 503–504
- Islamic calendar: 518–519
- Japanese calendar: Tenji 2 (天治２年)
- Javanese calendar: 1030–1031
- Julian calendar: 1125; MCXXV
- Korean calendar: 3458
- Minguo calendar: 787 before ROC 民前787年
- Nanakshahi calendar: −343
- Seleucid era: 1436/1437 AG
- Thai solar calendar: 1667–1668
- Tibetan calendar: ཤིང་ཕོ་འབྲུག་ལོ་ (male Wood-Dragon); 1251 or 870 or 98 — to — ཤིང་མོ་སྦྲུལ་ལོ་ (female Wood-Snake); 1252 or 871 or 99

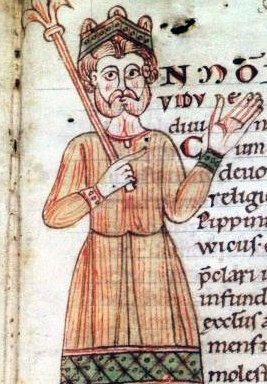
Lothair (1075–1137) becomes King of Germany this year

Year 1125 (MCXXV) was a common year starting on Thursday of the Julian calendar.

== Events ==
=== By place ===
==== Levant ====
- June 11 – Battle of Azaz: The Crusader states led by King Baldwin II of Jerusalem defeat the Seljuk forces at Azaz and raise the siege of the town. Baldwin mobilizes a force of 1,100 armoured knights (from Antioch, Edessa and Tripoli) and 2,000 foot-soldiers. The Crusaders capture the Seljuk camp and Baldwin takes enough loot to ransom the prisoners taken by the Seljuk Turks (including his 4-year-old daughter Ioveta and Joscelin II of Edessa who are taken hostage). Aq-Sunqur al-Bursuqi, governor (atabeg) of Mosul, withdraws to Aleppo and is forced to make a truce, leaving the frontier in northern Syria in peace for 18 months.

==== Europe ====
- May 23 – Henry V, Holy Roman Emperor, dies of cancer in Utrecht after leading an expedition against King Louis VI ("the Fat") of France and then against the citizens of Worms. Having no legitimate children, Henry leaves his possessions to his nephew, Frederick II ("the One-Eyed"), duke of Swabia. At the Hoftag diet in Regensburg, Lothair, duke of Saxony, is elected King of Germany and crowned at Aachen on September 13.
- Lothair II (supported by Pope Honorius II) asks Frederick II to restore to the crown the estates that he has inherited from Henry V. Frederick refuses, and by year's end a succession dispute breaks out between the House of Welf and the House of Hohenstaufen. The latter is led by Frederick and his brother Conrad III, duke of Franconia.
- King Inge the Younger of Sweden is murdered in Vreta Abbey at the instigation of Queen Ulvhild Håkansdotter after a 20-year reign. Her cousin Magnus Nielsen ("the Strong") becomes a ruler over Västergötland (until 1134).
- The Republic of Venice pillages the islands of Rhodes, ravages Samos and Lesbos, and occupies Chios (controlled by the Byzantine Empire). The Republic of Florence sacks and conquers the neighboring independent republic of Fiesole in Italy.
- Saracen pirates raid the city of Antibes in Provence and the Benedictine monastery of Saint Honorat on the Lérins Islands (French Riviera).
- The first fair in Portugal is created in Ponte de Lima; it is an early sign of commercialization and economic development.
- King Alfonso the Battler of Aragon and Navarre leads a Castellan raid in Andalusia (Southern Spain).

==== England ====
- King Henry I of England arranges a marriage between his nephew Stephen of Blois and the 20-year-old Matilda, daughter and heiress of Eustace III, count of Boulogne. This gives Stephen control of the County of Boulogne and also lands in England that have belonged to Eustace (who dies on his return from the Holy Land).

==== Asia ====
- November – Jin–Song War: Emperor Taizong of the Jurchen-led Jin dynasty declares war on the Chinese Song dynasty – and orders his armies to invade Song territory. He sends the Western army to the city of Taiyuan in Shanxi province and the Eastern army to Bianjing (modern-day Kaifeng), the Song capital. The Song forces are not expecting an invasion and are caught off guard.
- The Khamag Mongol, a Mongolic tribal confederation, begins to play an important role on the Mongolian Plateau. They occupy the fertile lands of the basins of the rivers Onon, Kherlen and Tuul in the Khentii Mountains.

==== Africa ====
- October 3 – Al-Ma'mun al-Bata'ihi, the vizier of the Fatimid Caliphate, is dismissed and imprisoned by Caliph al-Amir.

=== By topic ===
==== Arts ====
- Albert of Aix, German historian and writer, begins his Historia Hierosolymitanae expeditionis (approximate date).

==== Education ====
- March 29 – Reading School is founded in Berkshire in England.

==== Religion ====
- A collection of Zen Buddhist koans is compiled, in the Chinese Blue Cliff Record.

== Births ==
- October 17 – Lu You, Chinese poet and writer (d. 1210)
- date unknown
  - Abraham ben David, French rabbi (approximate date)
  - Baldwin of Forde, English archbishop (approximate date)
  - Bolesław IV (the Curly), duke of Poland (approximate date)
  - Chueang, Thai ruler of the Ngoenyang Kingdom (d. 1192)
  - Eystein II (Haraldsson), king of Norway (approximate date)
  - Fernando Rodríguez de Castro, Spanish nobleman (d. 1185)
  - Giovanni de Surdis Cacciafronte, Italian bishop (d. 1184)
  - Guigues V, count of Albon and Grenoble (approximate date)
  - Imad ad-Din al-Isfahani, Persian historian and writer (d. 1201)
  - Matilda of Savoy, queen consort of Portugal (d. 1157)
  - Otto II (the Rich), margrave of Meissen (d. 1190)
  - Reginald of Châtillon, French nobleman (d. 1187)
  - William de Vesci, Norman High Sheriff (d. 1184)
  - William of Æbelholt, French churchman (d. 1203)

== Deaths ==
- January 24 – David IV (the Builder), king of Georgia (b. 1073)
- April 12 – Vladislaus I, duke of Bohemia (b. 1065)
- May 19 – Vladimir II, Grand Prince of Kiev (b. 1053)
- May 23 – Henry V, Holy Roman Emperor (b. 1086)
- June 22 – Lambert of St-Bertin, French chronicler
- September 14 – Constance, princess of Antioch (b. 1078)
- September 27 – Richeza of Berg, duchess of Bohemia
- October 21 – Cosmas of Prague, Bohemian chronicler
- December 3 – Berengar II, German nobleman
- December 29 – Agnes I, abbess of Quedlinburg
- Adalbert II, count of Mörsberg (approximate date)
- Alina Martain, French Benedictine nun and saint
- Al-Ma'mun al-Bata'ihi, vizier of the Fatimid Caliphate
- Bernard of Sédirac, Spanish abbot and archbishop
- Bonfilius, Italian Benedictine monk and bishop
- Eustace III, count of Boulogne (approximate date)
- Harding of Bristol, English sheriff reeve (b. 1048)
- Hugh I, count of Champagne (approximate date)
- Ibn al-Khashshab, Seljuk Shi'i magistrate (qadi)
- Inge the Younger, king of Sweden (approximate date)
- Robert de Mowbray, Norman Earl of Northumbria
