= Domnall Ua Lochlainn =

Medieval Irish king

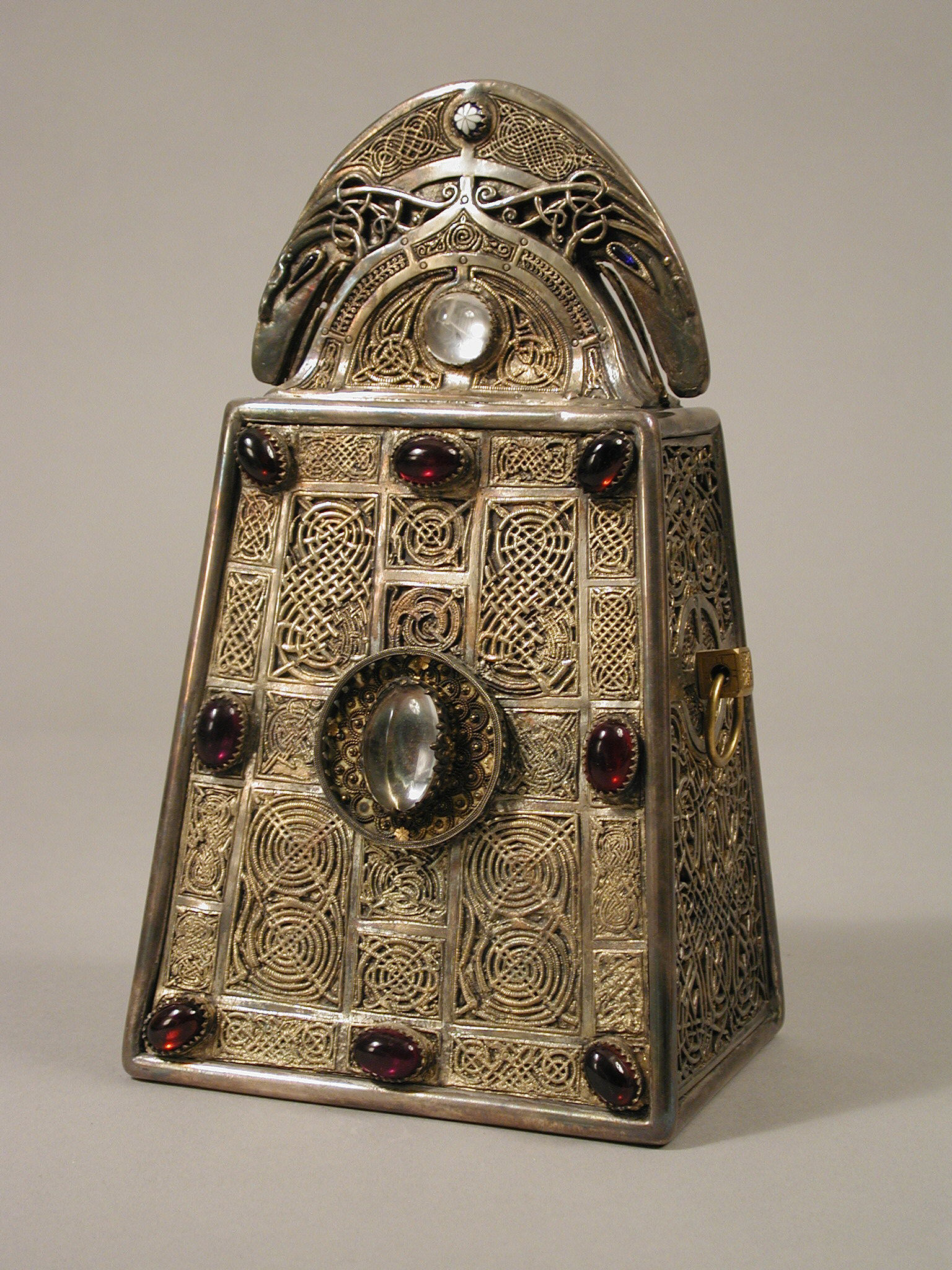
Saint Patrick's Shrine, now in the National Museum of Ireland, Dublin; an inscription on the rear begins "Pray for Domnall Ua Lochlainn on whose order this bell was made..."

Domhnall Ua Lochlainn (old spelling: Domnall Ua Lochlainn) (1048 – 10 February 1121), also known as Domhnall Mac Lochlainn (old spelling: Domnall Mac Lochlainn), was king of the Cenél Eogain, over-king of Ailech, and alleged High King of Ireland.

== High Kingship after Máel Sechnaill ==
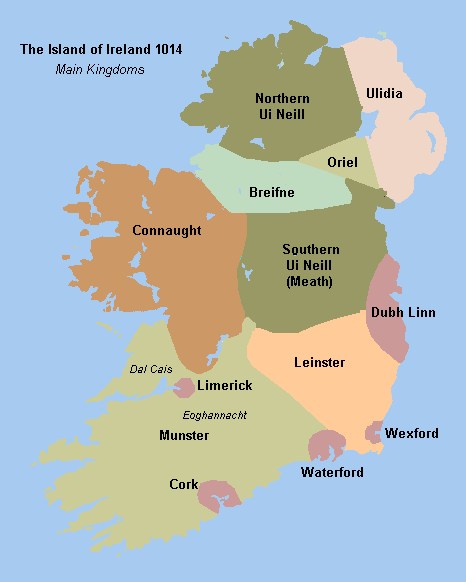
Outline political map of Ireland in 1014.

The meaning, and even the definition, of the High Kingship of Ireland to which Domnall laid claim was far from clear in the period after the death of the last traditional Uí Néill king of Tara, Máel Sechnaill mac Domnaill of Clann Cholmáin, in 1022. Later, rival kings produced differing definitions. Domnall's legal men, for example, claimed that a High King "with opposition" was the king of a province who could lead his army throughout Ireland without defeat, and this Domnall could do. The supporters of his southern rival, Muirchertach Ua Briain of Munster, disagreed, and said a High King "without opposition" should control three great port cities of Ireland: Dublin, Waterford, and Limerick, cities over which Muirchertach exercised some control.

Regardless of legal frictions, the first king to construct something resembling an over-lordship of Ireland after the death of Máel Sechnaill was Diarmait mac Maíl na mBó of the Uí Cheinnselaig. King of Leinster and the Foreigners in his obituary, Diarmait was more than this, the effective ruler of much of Ireland. His son Murchad ruled Dublin, Toirdelbach Ua Briain in Munster was his client, and Niall mac Eochada of Ulster was his ally. Diarmait's career ended with his death in battle, attempting to subjugate the heirs of Máel Sechnaill, on Tuesday 7 February 1072.

Diarmait's position was quickly taken by his former ally Toirdelbach Ua Briain. Ua Briain installed his son, Muirchertach in Dublin, and campaigned in Ulster. In Leinster and Connacht he pursued a policy of setting rival families against each other. Domnall Ua Lochlainn, on his coming to power in 1084, was left undisturbed by Ua Briain, who fell ill the following year and died in 1086, aged 77. At his death, even the partisan northern annals recognized Toirdelbach Ua Briain as king of Ireland.

== Origins ==
Domnall was the son of a certain Ardgar son of Lochlann. Genealogical compilations, such as that surviving in the Rawlinson B.502 manuscript trace Domnall's ancestry back, through the High King Domnall ua Néill, and his father the heroic Muirchertach of the Leather Cloaks, to Niall Glúndub. It appears subtly different in the Book of Leinster. Rather than being the descendants of Lochlann, grandson of Domnall ua Néill, the Meic Lochlainn appear to have been descended from another Lochlann, Lochlann mac Maíl Sechnaíll, a descendant of Niall Glúndub's less renowned brother Domnall Dabaill. Nonetheless, the Meic Lochlainn were members of the Cenél nEógain branch of the Uí Néill, and could rightly claim famous ancestors. Under Domnall, the Cenél nEógain were again a significant force in Irish politics.

In the years before Domnall, the Cenél nEógain had been largely bereft of effective leadership, so much so that Conchobar Ua Briain of Munster, cousin and bitter enemy of Toirdelbach, had been invited to take the kingship of the Tulach Óc branch of the kindred, and following Conchobar's murder with his wife in 1078, his brother Cennétig was invited to succeed him.

Domnall became king of Ailech in 1083 and began his reign in traditional fashion, with an inaugural raid—crech ríg—against the Conaille Muirthemne (in the region of modern Dundalk, County Louth). The Annals of Ulster state that Domnall "carried off a great prey of cattle and gave stipends from that prey to the men of Fernmag [the people and land from whom modern County Fermanagh was named]".

However, Muirchertach Ua Briain the new king of Munster (a matrilineal kinsman of Toirdelbach), moved to oppose the rule of Meic Lochlainn between 1101 and 1119.

== Death and after ==
Domnall's glowing obituary in the Annals of Ulster reads as follows:

Domnall son of Ardgar son of Lochlann, over-king of Ireland, pre-eminent among the Irish in form and lineage, in sense and valour, in happiness and prosperity, in giving valuables and food, died in Daire Coluim Cille in the thirty-eighth year of his reign, the seventy-third year of his age, on Wednesday night, the fourth of the Ides [i.e. 10 February 1121] and the eighteenth of the moon, the feast of Mo-Chuaróc the wise.
