= 1149 in Ireland =

- Centuries: 11th; 12th; 13th; 14th
- Decades: 1120s; 1130s; 1140s; 1150s; 1160s
- See also: Other events of 1149; List of years in Ireland

Events from the year 1149 in Ireland.

== Incumbents ==
- High King: Toirdelbach Ua Conchobair

== Events ==
- An army led by Toirdhealbhach mac Diarmada Ua Briain, King of Munster, and his forces marched into the province of Connacht, carrying off a large spoil of cattle and destroying the fortress of Dún Béal Gallimhe (Galway). During this campaign, Ua Lochlainn, lord of Corca-Modhruadh, drowned in the River Gaillimh.

== Deaths ==
- Gilla Pátraic Ua hAilchinned, Bishop of Clonfert
