= 1147 in Ireland =

- Centuries: 11th; 12th; 13th; 14th
- Decades: 1120s; 1130s; 1140s; 1150s; 1160s
- See also: Other events of 1147; List of years in Ireland

Events from the year 1147 in Ireland.

== Incumbents ==
- High King: Toirdelbach Ua Conchobair

== Events ==
- Bective Abbey is formed by Murchad O’Maeil-Sheachlainn as a daughter house of Mellifont Abbey.
- The community at St. Mary's Abbey (Dublin) (originally Savigniac) joined the Cistercian order.
- Antrim Round Tower was burned, and surrounding buildings were later removed.

== Deaths ==
- Muireadhach Ua Flannagain, a distinguished priest
