= 1158 in Ireland =

- Centuries: 11th; 12th; 13th; 14th
- Decades: 1130s; 1140s; 1150s; 1160s; 1170s
- See also: Other events of 1158; List of years in Ireland

Events from the year 1158 in Ireland.

== Incumbents ==
- High King: Toirdelbach Ua Conchobair

== Events ==
- The Roman Catholic Diocese of Derry was founded.

== Deaths ==
- Domnall Ua Longargain, Archbishop of Munster
