= 1165 in Ireland =

- Centuries: 11th; 12th; 13th; 14th
- Decades: 1140s; 1150s; 1160s; 1170s; 1180s
- See also: Other events of 1165; List of years in Ireland

The following events occurred in Ireland in the year 1165.

== Incumbents ==
- High King: Muirchertach Mac Lochlainn

== Events ==
- Domnall Ua Gilla-Patraic (descendant), king of North Ossory, and Conchobar Ua Broighte, king of Cenn-caille, were killed by Ma[c] Craith Ua Mordhai and by the Laichsi for evil causes.

== Deaths ==
- Diarmait Mac Artain, chief of Clann-Fogartaigh
