= 1173 in Ireland =

- Centuries: 11th; 12th; 13th; 14th
- Decades: 1150s; 1160s; 1170s; 1180s; 1190s
- See also: Other events of 1173; List of years in Ireland

Events from the year 1173 in Ireland.

== Incumbent ==
- High King: Ruaidri Ua Conchobair

== Events ==
- Aedh mac Óenghusa and the Clann-Aedha conducted a foray (raid) in the territory known as the Great Third of Armagh; Aedh was killed within three months of this action.
- Mael Sechlainn meic Domnaill Ua Mael Sechlainn becomes first Lord of Clonlonan King of Meath

== Deaths ==
- Cinaeth Ua Róna, bishop of Glenn-da-locha
- Mael-Ísu Mac-in-Baird, bishop of Cluain-ferta of St. Brenainn
