= Meic Torcaill =

The Meic Torcaill, also known as the Meic Turcaill, the Mac Torcaill dynasty, the Mac Turcaill dynasty, and the Mac Turcaill family, were a leading Norse-Gaelic family in mediaeval Dublin. The kindred produced several eminent men and kings of Dublin before the Norman conquest of the kingdom in 1170. Afterwards the family fell from prominence, losing possession of their extensive lands in the region. In time the Meic Torcaill lost precedence to other Dublin families, such as the Harolds and Archbolds.

== Norse-Gaelic Dublin ==
Simplified family tree illustrating one of several possible lines of descent of the Meic Torcall kings of Dublin.

Torcall (fl. 1133)
Ragnall; King of Dublin	Brodar; King of Dublin
unnamed (died 1138)	Ragnall (fl. 1167)	Ascall; King of Dublin

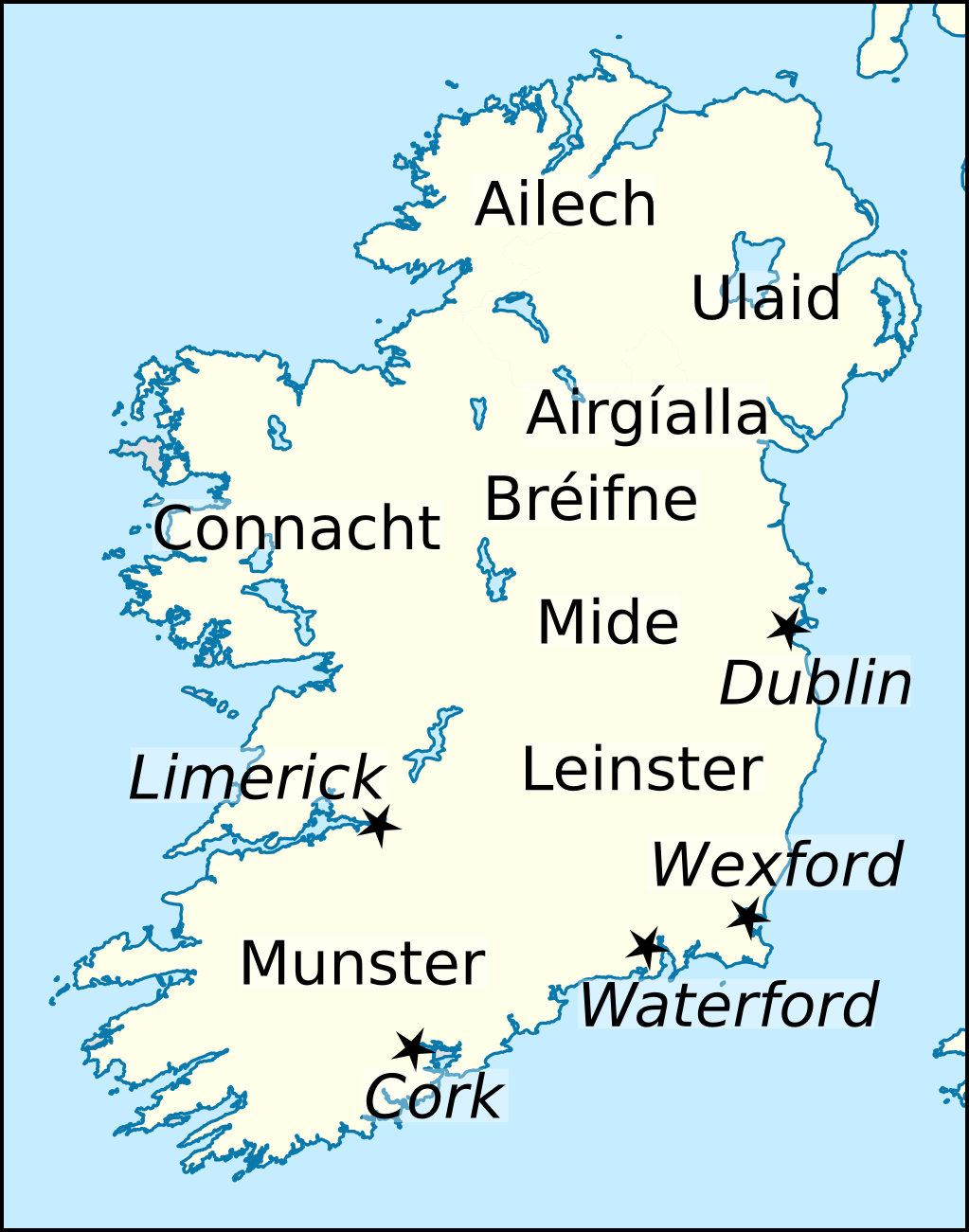
Locations of significant Norse-Gaelic settlements, including the Kingdom of Dublin, and major Irish kingdoms.

The origins of the Meic Torcaill are uncertain. A possible family predecessor may have been a certain Torcall mac Éola, whose slaying in Wales in 1093 is recorded by the Annals of Inisfallen. It is possible that this man was the eponymous ancestor of the family. A son of his may have been the Torfind mac Torcaill whose death in 1124 is recorded by both the Annals of Ulster, and the Annals of Loch Cé. Torcall mac Éola may have also been related to a certain twelfth-century Manx bishop, "Hamondus filius Iole", recorded by the Chronicle of Mann.

Whatever their precise origins, the Meic Torcaill can certainly be traced back to an early twelfth century. The first member of the family is a certain Torcall, whose rise to power appears to have occurred by 1133, as evidenced by the Annals of Loch Cé, at about a time when Dublin was closely aligned with Diarmait Mac Murchada, King of Leinster (died 1171). The latter lost control of the Dublin in 1141, however, as the Annals of the Four Masters reveals that the town was seized and held by Conchobar Ua Briain, King of Munster (died 1142). Following Conchobar's ousting, the same source indicates that the Dubliner's installed a certain Islesman, Ottar mac meic Ottair (died 1148), as King of Dublin in 1142. The head of the Meic Torcaill during this period appears to have been Torcall's son, Ragnall (died 1146). The Annals of the Four Masters records that the son of an unnamed member of the Meic Torcaill was slain in 1138, and it is possible that this man was in fact a son of Ragnall. If so, his death may well have weakened the family, and allowed the Meic Ottair to seize power.

Two years after Ottar's installation, he and an unnamed member of the Meic Torcaill (who may well have been Ragnall himself), and an unnamed son of a certain Erulb, are noted in the context of mercenary operations in Wales by the thirteenth- and fourteenth-century texts Brenhinedd y Saesson, Brut y Tywysogyon, and the "B" and "C" versions of the eleventh- to thirteenth-century Annales Cambriæ.

In 1146, several sources, such as the Annals of Tigernach, Chronicon Scotorum, and Mac Carthaigh's Book, record the slaying of the aforesaid Ragnall, styling him King of Dublin. If these sources are to be believed, Ragnall's reign would appear to begin at some point after the aforesaid operations in Wales, and interrupted the reign of Ottar, who died as king in 1148. The Annals of the Four Masters, however, accord Ragnall the title mórmáer, which could indicate that he was merely a subordinate within Ottar's regime. Although Ottar may well have enjoyed the cooperation of the Meic Torcaill in the early part of his reign, the Annals of Tigernach and Chronicon Scotorum reveal that they were responsible for his slaying in 1148.

The next Meic Torcaill monarch was Ragnall's brother, Brodar (died 1160), whose slaying in 1160, at the hands of the Meic Gilla Sechnaill of South Brega, is revealed by the thirteenth-century Cottonian Annals, the Annals of the Four Masters, the Annals of Ulster, and the Annals of Tigernach.

Following Diarmait's acquisition of dominance over Dublin in 1162, Diarmait is reported to have made several grants to churches in Fine Gall. One such grant, to Áed Ua Cáellaide, Bishop of Louth, dating between 1162 and 1166, concerned the lands of Baldoyle, and was witnessed by several members of the Meic Torcaill: a certain Echmarcach and Aralt.

The last King of Dublin was Ragnall's son, Ascall (died 1171). In 1167, the Annals of the Four Masters record that a certain Ragnall mac Ragnaill, styled tigerna Gall ("lord of the foreigners"), attended a great assembly convened by Ruaidrí Ua Conchobair, King of Connacht (died 1198). The latter's name and title suggest that he was either an otherwise unattested brother of Ascall, or else an annalist's mistake for Ascall himself. Whatever the case, according to the Expugnatio Hibernica, Ascall was driven from the kingship in 1170 by the forces of Richard de Clare, Earl of Pembroke. The following year he was finally defeated in an attempt to retake Dublin. Although a multitude of Irish sources—such as the Annals of the Four Masters, the Annals of Ulster, the Annals of Loch Cé, the Annals of Tigernach, and Mac Carthaigh's Book — place his death in the context of the military defeat, the Expugnatio Hibernica and the twelfth- to thirteenth-century La Geste des Engleis en Yrlande reveal that he was publicly executed.

== Diminishment ==
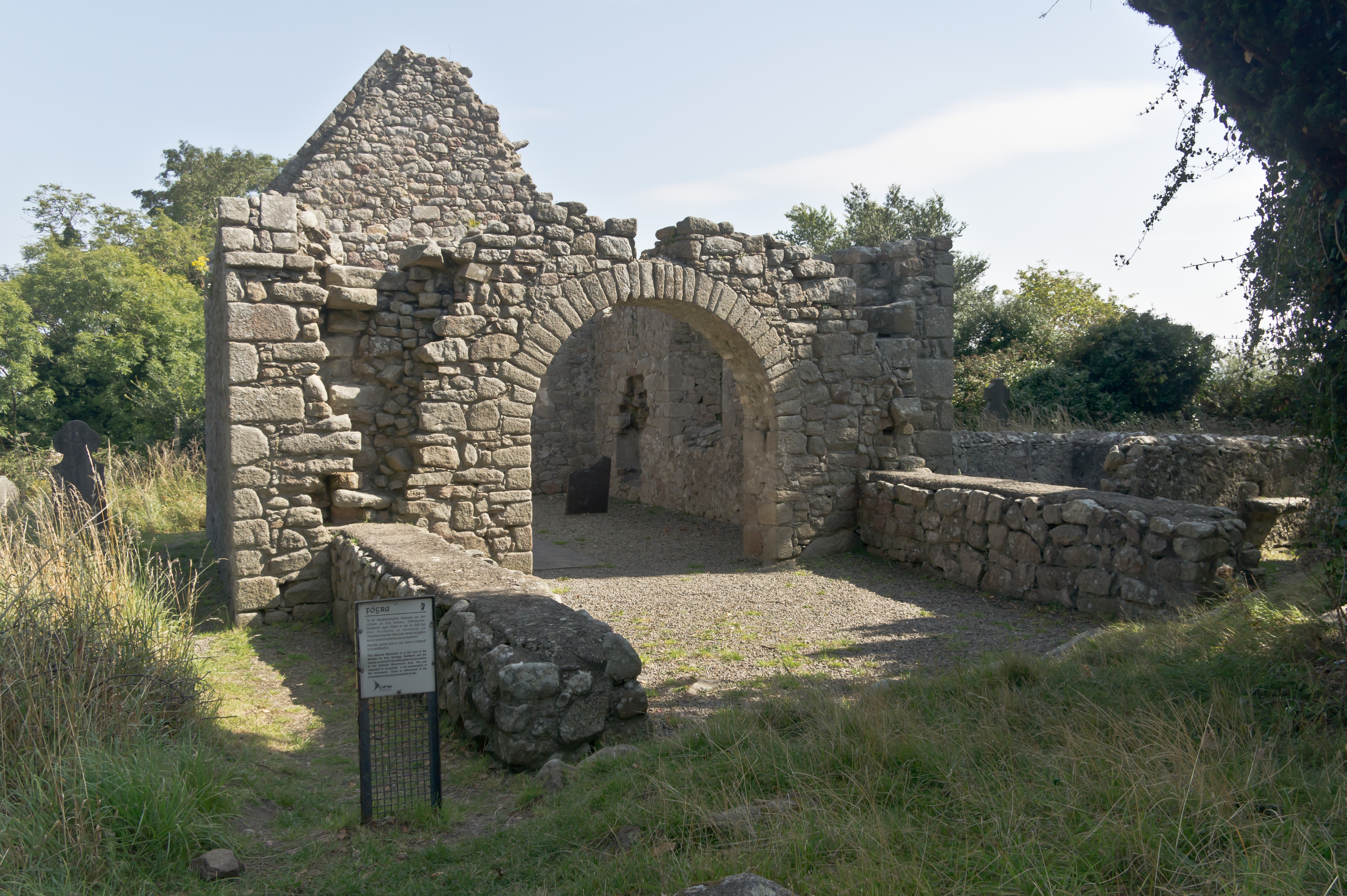
Ruinous mediaeval church of Tully, near Cabinteely. This religious house, and its surrounding lands, were once possessions of the Meic Torcaill.

The power of the Meic Torcaill before the fall of Dublin is apparent in the lands associated with them. A charter post-dating Ascall's fall reveals that he granted the church of St Brigid and the surrounding lands to the Church of the Holy Trinity. Another member of the family, a man named Sitric, is also stated to have granted the church and lands of Tully to the Church of the Holy Trinity. With the fall of the last Meic Torcaill monarch, and the consolidation of the English control of Dublin, the family's territories were evidently declared forfeit. Lands lost by the family at this point include a tract from Tully to Bray, stretching to Glencullen, granted to Walter de Ridlesford. Walter's grant included a significant part of the territory in Uí Briúin Chualann and much of the lands named "Odurchill" in the Latin charter, a reference to Meic Torcaill territories in what is today south Dublin and north-east County Wicklow. Other Meic Torcaill lands included holdings in north Dublin at Portrane, Malahide, Portmarnock, and Kilbarrack. Furthermore, Richard is recorded to have granted lands, formerly possessed by the Meic Torcaill, to the abbey of St Mary at Dublin.

Not all losses were final, however, as a certain Hamund Mac Torcaill, and his brothers, are recorded to have been confirmed in their Kinsealy lands in 1174. This partial restoration of family lands is one part of a process in which leading Dublin families were incorporated into the new English regime, and it is probable that this was also about the time of that the Harold family was also 'rehabilitated'.

In time, the Harolds and Archbolds began to fill the vacuum of the diminished Meic Torcaill. A certain "G. Mactorail" is recorded to have witnessed a grant of Thomas, Abbot of Glendalough to Lorcán Ua Tuathail, Archbishop of Dublin (died 1180) between 1172 and 1181. Another grant, to St Mary's Abbey, Dublin between 1172 and 1181, was witnessed by a certain Alan Mac Torcaill.

The Meic Torcaill may well be remembered in several Irish place names. For example, the earthwork of Rathturtle, located near Blessington, appears to be derived from the Irish Rath Torcaill, and therefore may refer to a member of the family. Whether the hilltop was the site of a Norse fortress is uncertain, however, since the site has not been excavated, and appears to be similar to an Anglo-Norman ringwork.

Another name seemingly referring to a member of the Meic Torcaill is that of the townlands Curtlestown Upper (Baile Mhic Thorcail Uachtarach) and Curtlestown Lower (Baile Mhic Thorcail Íochtarach), located near Powerscourt.
