= Brodar mac Torcaill =

- King of Dublin
- Reign: 1148–1 July 1160
- Predecessor: Óttar of Dublin
- Successor: Ascall mac Ragnaill
- Born: 1104
- Died: 1 July 1160 (aged 55–56); Brega
- House: Meic Torcaill
- Father: Torcall

Brodar mac Torcaill (1104 – 1 July 1160), also known as Brodar Mac Turcaill, was a late twelfth century King of Dublin. He was a member of the Meic Torcaill, a substantial landholding kindred in the kingdom. His death in 1160, at the hands of the Meic Gilla Sechnaill of South Brega, is revealed by the thirteenth-century Cottonian Annals, the seventeenth-century Annals of the Four Masters, the fifteenth- to sixteenth-century Annals of Ulster, and the fourteenth-century Annals of Tigernach.

== Citations ==
Brodar mac Torcaill Meic Torcaill Died: 1160
Regnal titles
Unknown Last known title holder: Ottar mac meic Ottair	King of Dublin ×1160	Unknown Next known title holder: Ascall mac Ragnaill
