= 1164 in Ireland =

- Centuries: 11th; 12th; 13th; 14th
- Decades: 1140s; 1150s; 1160s; 1170s; 1180s
- See also: Other events of 1164; List of years in Ireland

The following events occurred in Ireland in the year 1164.

== Incumbents ==
- High King: Muirchertach Mac Lochlainn

== Events ==
- Damlaic mór (big stone church) built in Derry.
- Terryglass was burned.

== Deaths ==
Mael Sechlainn mac Congalaig, King of Uí Failghe
