= 1163 in Ireland =

- Centuries: 11th; 12th; 13th; 14th
- Decades: 1140s; 1150s; 1160s; 1170s; 1180s
- See also: Other events of 1163; List of years in Ireland

Events from the year 1163 in Ireland.

== Incumbents ==
- High King: Muirchertach Mac Lochlainn

== Events ==
- Christ Church Cathedral, Dublin was converted to a priory of the Regular Order of Arrosian Canons (Reformed Augustinian Rule) by the second Archbishop of Dublin, Laurence O'Toole.
