= 1142 in Ireland =

- Centuries: 11th; 12th; 13th; 14th
- Decades: 1120s; 1130s; 1140s; 1150s; 1160s
- See also: Other events of 1142; List of years in Ireland

Events from the year 1142 in Ireland.

== Incumbents ==
- High King: Toirdelbach Ua Conchobair

== Events ==
- Foundation of the first Cistercian house in Ireland at Mellifont, on land given by the King of Airgíalla. Abbey completed in 1157. The Cistercians were brought into Ireland by Saint Malachy

== Deaths ==
- Conchobar Ua Briain, a ruler of the kingdoms of Munster and Dublin.
