= 1171 in Ireland =

- Centuries: 11th; 12th; 13th; 14th
- Decades: 1150s; 1160s; 1170s; 1180s; 1190s
- See also: Other events of 1171; List of years in Ireland

Events from the year 1171 in Ireland.

== Events ==
- May – following the death of Diarmait Mac Murchada, King of Leinster, the lordship of Leinster is disputed between his son, Domhnall Caomhánach, and the Cambro-Norman Richard de Clare (Strongbow).
- Henry II of England arrives in Ireland; Irish bishops and most Irish kings submit to his rule.
- Ascall mac Ragnaill, last Norse–Gaelic King of Dublin, is captured while trying to retake Dublin from de Clare, perhaps in company with Sweyn Asleifsson, and beheaded; before the end of the year, de Clare relinquishes possession of the city to his own liege lord, Henry.

== Deaths ==
- 1 May – Diarmait Mac Murchada, King of Leinster (born 1110).
- Ascall mac Ragnaill, King of Dublin.
