= 1161 in Ireland =

- Centuries: 11th; 12th; 13th; 14th
- Decades: 1140s; 1150s; 1160s; 1170s; 1180s
- See also: Other events of 1161; List of years in Ireland

Events from the year 1161 in Ireland.

== Incumbents ==
- High King: Muirchertach Mac Lochlainn

== Deaths ==
- Archbishop Gregory, Archbishop of Dublin
- Ragnall Ua Dálaigh, poet.
