= 1172 in Ireland =

- Centuries: 11th; 12th; 13th; 14th
- Decades: 1150s; 1160s; 1170s; 1180s; 1190s
- See also: Other events of 1172; List of years in Ireland

Events from the year 1172 in Ireland.

== Events ==
- Second Synod of Cashel.
- Meath is granted to Hugh de Lacy by Henry II of England.
- Henry II of England leaves Ireland.
- Supposed construction date of first Hook Lighthouse.

== Births ==
Walter de Lacy (d.1241) Lord of Meath.

== Deaths ==
- Death of Breifne King, Tiernan O'Rourke.
