= 1167 in Ireland =

- Centuries: 11th; 12th; 13th; 14th
- Decades: 1140s; 1150s; 1160s; 1170s; 1180s
- See also: Other events of 1167; List of years in Ireland

Events from the year 1167 in Ireland.

== Incumbents ==
- High King: Ruaidrí Ua Conchobair

== Events ==
- August – Diarmait Mac Murchada, exiled King of Leinster, returns from Wales with a force of Flemings under Richard fitz Godbert de Roche of Rhos (the first Anglo-Norman knight to land in Ireland) and retakes control of the Uí Ceinnselaig, presaging the Norman invasion of Ireland, but fails to take Waterford.
- Muirchertach Mac Lochlainn, High King of Ireland, presides over an assembly of laity and clergy of Leath Cuinn at Áth Buide Tlachtga (Athboy); marches to Armagh; divides Tír Eoghain between Niall Mac Lochlainn and Áed Ua Néill; and (at about this date) holds an Óenach Tailten.
- Completion of Derbforgaill's Nun's Church at Clonmacnoise by Conchobar ua Cellaig, king of the Uí Maine, to replace a wooden oratory.

== Deaths ==
- Uada Ua Con Ceanainn, King of Uí Díarmata; he is perhaps succeeded by Cú Ceanain Ó Con Ceanainn.
- Toirdelbhach MacDiarmaida Ó Briain, King of Thomond; he is succeeded by his son Muirchertach.
- The Barnwells arrived in Ireland with Strongbow in 1167 and had settled in Berehaven in Munster.
