= 1168 in Ireland =

- Centuries: 11th; 12th; 13th; 14th
- Decades: 1140s; 1150s; 1160s; 1170s; 1180s
- See also: Other events of 1168; List of years in Ireland

Events from the year 1168 in Ireland.

== Incumbents ==
- High King: Ruaidrí Ua Conchobair

== Events ==
- Domnall Mór Ua Briain becomes King of Thomond following the murder of his brother Muirchertach.
- St Mary's Cathedral, Limerick is founded on the site of a palace given by Domnall Mór Ua Briain.

== Deaths ==
- Ua Cerbaill, Bishop of Roscrea.
- Amhlaeibh Mac Innaighneorach, Chief Harper of Ireland.
