= Máel Brigte Ua Brolcháin =

Máel Brigte Ua Brolcháin was a medieval Irish bishop.

He was bishop of "Ard Macha" (Armagh) in the Annals of Ulster, but probably took care over the ee of Cinél nEógain. Brolcháin died on 29 January 1139.

Catholic Church titles
| Preceded by Máel Coluim Ua Brolcháin | Bishops of Cinél nEógain before 1122-1139 | Succeeded by Ua Gormgaile |
