= 1170 in Ireland =

- Centuries: 11th; 12th; 13th; 14th
- Decades: 1150s; 1160s; 1170s; 1180s; 1190s
- See also: Other events of 1170; List of years in Ireland

Events from the year 1170 in Ireland.

== Events ==
- 21 September - Following a siege, combined Anglo-Norman and Irish forces seize Dublin, forcing Ascall mac Ragnaill, King of Dublin, into exile.
- Arrival of Richard de Clare, 2nd Earl of Pembroke (Strongbow).
- Strongbow is married to Dermot MacMurrough’s daughter, Aoife.
- Invasion of Meath.
