= Amlaím Ua Muirethaig =

Medieval Irish bishop

Amlaím Ua Muirethaig also known in Latin as Mauricius, was a medieval Irish bishop.

He was styled "Bishop of Ard-Macha and Cenel-Feradhaigh" in the Annals of Ulster and appears to be reckoned as coarb of Saint Patrick in the Book of Leinster, but probably took care over the See of Cinél nEógain. Muirethaig died at Cenél Feradaig Cruthnai in 1185 and is buried at Derry.

Catholic Church titles
Preceded by Muiredach Ua Cobthaig	Bishops of Cinél nEógain; 1173-1185	Succeeded by Fogartach Ua Cerballáin
