= Máel Coluim Ua Brolcháin =

Máel Coluim Ua Brolcháin was a medieval Irish bishop.

He was bishop of Ard Macha" (Armagh) in the Annals of Ulster, but probably took care over the See of Cinél nEógain. Brolcháin was consecrated on 13 September 1107. He died at Derry in 1122.

Catholic Church titles
Preceded by First recorded incumbent	Bishops of Cinél nEógain before 1107-1122	Succeeded by Máel Brigte Ua Brolcháin
