= Óttar of Dublin =

Óttar
- King of Dublin
- Reign: c. 1142–1 July 1148
- Predecessor: Conchobar Ua Briain
- Successor: Brodar mac Torcaill
- Born: c. 1114; Probably the Hebrides
- Died: 1 July 1148; Dublin
- Spouse: Helga
- Issue: ?Óttar, Thorfinn Mac Oitir
- Father: Óttar

Viking Age Dublin

Óttar of Dublin (or Óttarr of Dublin), in Irish Oitir Mac mic Oitir (Oitir the son of a son of Oitir), was a Hiberno-Norse King of Dublin, reigning in 1142–1148. Alternative names used in modern scholarship include Óttar of the Isles and Óttar Óttarsson.

== Life ==
Óttar was a powerful man from the Norse-Gaelic territory of the Western Isles of Scotland, known as the Sudreyjar to the Vikings. He seized control of the Kingdom of Dublin in 1142, according to Clare Downham after having been invited by the townspeople to become their king. He is described as the grandson of Óttar in the Annals of the Four Masters and as the son of Óttar (McOtyr) in the Annals of Clonmacnoise. It is possible that both records are correct and that Óttar of Dublin was the son of a man named Óttar whose own father was also Óttar. Either his father or grandfather was the Jarl Óttar, killed in 1098, who is recorded as controlling half of the Isle of Man. One source unambiguously names Jarl Óttar of Man as the father of Óttar of Dublin, and also names his mother, one Svanhilda "a Danish lady." Before his takeover of Dublin he is not specifically mentioned as holding the title jarl, but his evident access to substantial military resources and the use of the title by both his forebears and descendants suggests that he was of that rank.

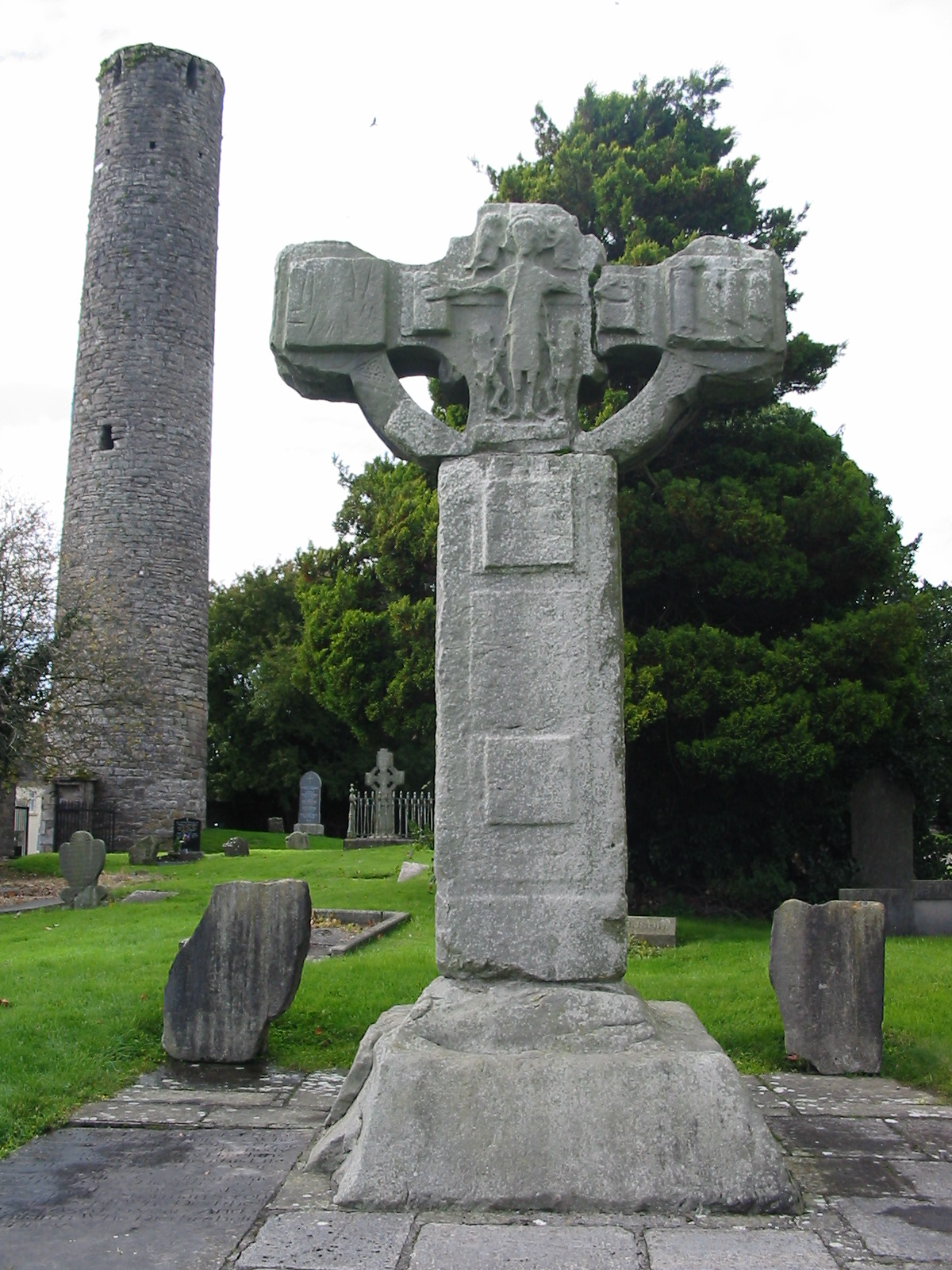
Cross and round tower at Kells, Meath

Óttar of Dublin belonged to what has been referred to as a 'dynasty of Óttars,' a family characterised by the repeated use of the personal name Óttar. Over a number of centuries its members were active throughout the Irish Sea zone, often in conjunction with the Uí Ímair, from Caithness in the far north of Scotland to Cork in the south of Ireland.

According to G. de P. Cotter, following his occupation of Dublin, Óttar "...burned the cathedral of Kells, and plundered that town. This most likely refers to the Church at Kells in County Meath, even though this church wasn't elevated to the status of "cathedral" until after the synod of Kells. The Annals of the Four Masters record that Kells ("Ceanannus") was burned in 1143 and three times in 1144.

Several versions of the Brut y Tywysogion record that an Óttar based in Dublin, and described as the "son of the other Óttar," was active fighting as a mercenary in Wales in 1144. This Óttar was either the king or, possibly, a son of the same name. The expedition to Wales was intended to support Cadwaladr ap Gruffydd against his brother Owain, king of Gwynedd. The force, transported by a fleet of vessels, landed at Abermenai in an attempt to force Owain to return Cadwaladr's lands. Relations with Cadwaladr apparently deteriorated and Óttar's men eventually took him hostage and demanded a ransom, the ransom being "two thousand slaves." Cadwaladr escaped from his erstwhile allies and made peace with his brother, who then forcibly induced the Dubliners to leave.

Contemporary annals suggest that Óttar was co-king with Ragnall mac Torcaill, until Ragnall was killed in a battle against the forces of Midhe (Meath) in 1145 or 1146: "A slaughter was made of the foreigners of Ath-cliath [Dublin] by the people of East Meath, where two hundred persons were slain, together with Raghnall Mac Torcaill, Mormaer of Ath-cliath, and Jufraigh, and many others of their chieftains." Raghnall was probably subordinate to Óttar. This is supported by the use of the title mormaer to describe Ragnall in the Annals of the Four Masters, though other annals call him king (in Irish "rí").

Óttar retained control of Dublin until 1148 when he was "treacherously killed" by the Meic Torcaill, the kin of Ragnall mac Torcaill. According to Downham, Óttar and the sons of Torcall initially co-operated, "...but a succession dispute emerged which led to Óttar's death in 1148".

== Posterity ==
He was married to Helga daughter of Tolokunger, a Danish commander, and was the father of Thorfinus filius Oter, who was described as the most powerful jarl (princeps) in the Western Isles.

He is claimed as an ancestor by the Cotter family of County Cork, Ireland, whose original name was Mac Oitir (son of Óttar), 'through Óttar's son Thorfin and grandson Therulfe.'

== Fiction ==
Óttar, the variant Irish spelling Otir is used, appears as a character in The Summer of the Danes by Ellis Peters in the Brother Cadfael series. The book uses Cadwaladr ap Gruffydd's attempt to reclaim his lands with the help of a "Danish" fleet as the background to the plot.

== See also ==
- Kingdom of Dublin
- Norse–Gaels
- Cotter family
- Cotter baronets
- Ohthere

== Notes ==
Regnal titles
Preceded by Conchobar Ua Briain	King of Dublin; 1142–1148 with Ragnall mac Torcaill (1142?–1146)	Succeeded by Brodar mac Torcaill
