= Gilla in Choimded Ó Cerbailláin =

Gilla in Choimded Ó Cerbailláin (died 1279), also known in Latin as Germanus, was a medieval Irish bishop.

Ó Cerbailláin was elected Bishop of Cinél nEógain in 1230. In 1254 he transferred the See from Ráith Lúraig (Maghera) to Derry.

Catholic Church titles
Preceded by Fogartach Ua Cerballáin	Bishops of Cinél nEógain before 1230-1279	Succeeded by Florentius
