= 1159 in Ireland =

- Centuries: 11th; 12th; 13th; 14th
- Decades: 1130s; 1140s; 1150s; 1160s; 1170s
- See also: Other events of 1159; List of years in Ireland

Events from the year 1159 in Ireland.

== Incumbents ==
- High King: Muirchertach Mac Lochlainn

== Deaths ==
- Aed mac Donnchada (Gilla na Findmona), King of Uí Failghe
