= Ua Gormgaile =

Irish bishop from 1149 to 1152

Ua Gormgaile was a medieval Irish bishop: he was Bishop of Cinél nEógain from 1149 to 1152.

Catholic Church titles
Preceded by Máel Brigte Ua Brolcháin	Bishops of Cinél nEógain before 1149-1152	Succeeded by Muiredach Ua Cobthaig
