= Fogartach Ua Cerballáin =

Medieval Irish bishop

Fogartach Ua Cerballáin, also known in Latin as Florentius, was a medieval Irish bishop.

Catholic Church titles
Preceded by Amlaím Ua Muirethaig	Bishops of Cinél nEógain; 1185-1230	Succeeded by Gilla in Choimded Ó Cerbailláin
