= 1150 in Ireland =

- Centuries: 11th; 12th; 13th; 14th
- Decades: 1130s; 1140s; 1150s; 1160s; 1170s
- See also: Other events of 1150; List of years in Ireland

Events from the year 1150 in Ireland.

== Incumbents ==
- High King: Toirdelbach Ua Conchobair

== Births ==
- John de Courcy (also John de Courci) (d. 1219), an Anglo-Norman knight who arrived in Ireland in 1176.
