= 1153 in Ireland =

- Centuries: 11th; 12th; 13th; 14th
- Decades: 1130s; 1140s; 1150s; 1160s; 1170s
- See also: Other events of 1153; List of years in Ireland

Events from the year 1153 in Ireland.

== Incumbents ==
- High King: Toirdelbach Ua Conchobair

== Events ==
- Devorgilla (married to Tiernan O'Rourke) eloped with Dermot McMurrough (the King of Leinster) to Ferns, an act which brought about a feud and McMurrough's eventual exile from Ireland.

== Births ==
- Cathal Crobhdearg Ua Conchobair, King of Connacht (died 1224).
