= 1143 in Ireland =

- Centuries: 11th; 12th; 13th; 14th
- Decades: 1120s; 1130s; 1140s; 1150s; 1160s
- See also: Other events of 1143; List of years in Ireland

Events from the year 1143 in Ireland.

== Incumbents ==
- High King: Toirdelbach Ua Conchobair

== Events ==
- Dermod Mór na Cill Baghain MacCarthy became King of Desmond

== Deaths ==
- Donogh MacCarthy, King of Desmond
