= 1151 in Ireland =

- Centuries: 11th; 12th; 13th; 14th
- Decades: 1130s; 1140s; 1150s; 1160s; 1170s
- See also: Other events of 1151; List of years in Ireland

Events from the year 1151 in Ireland.

== Incumbents ==
- High King: Toirdelbach Ua Conchobair

== Events ==
The Battle of Móin Mhór was fought in 1151 between the kingdoms of Leinster and Thomond in Ireland. The Kingdom of Leinster was victorious.
