= Ragnall mac Torcaill =

- King of Dublin
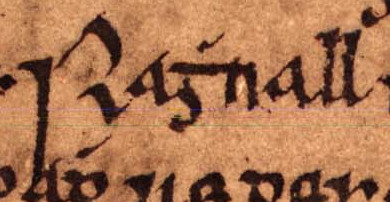
- Ragnall's name as it appears on folio 23r of Oxford Bodleian Library MS Rawlinson B 488 (the Annals of Tigernach): "Raghnall".
- Died: 1146
- House: Meic Torcaill
- Father: Torcall

Ragnall mac Torcaill (died 1146) was a twelfth-century Norse-Gaelic magnate who may have been King of Dublin. (Note: Since the 1980s, academics have accorded Ragnall various patronyms in English secondary sources: Raghnall mac Turcaill, Ragnall mac Torcaill, Ragnall Mac Torcaill, Ragnall mac Turcaill, and Ragnall Mac Turcaill.) He was a member of the Meic Torcaill, and may be identical to a member of this family who campaigned in Wales in 1144. Ragnall was slain in 1146, with some sources styling him king in records of his demise. He was the father of at least one son, Ascall, a man who certainly reigned as king.

== Background ==
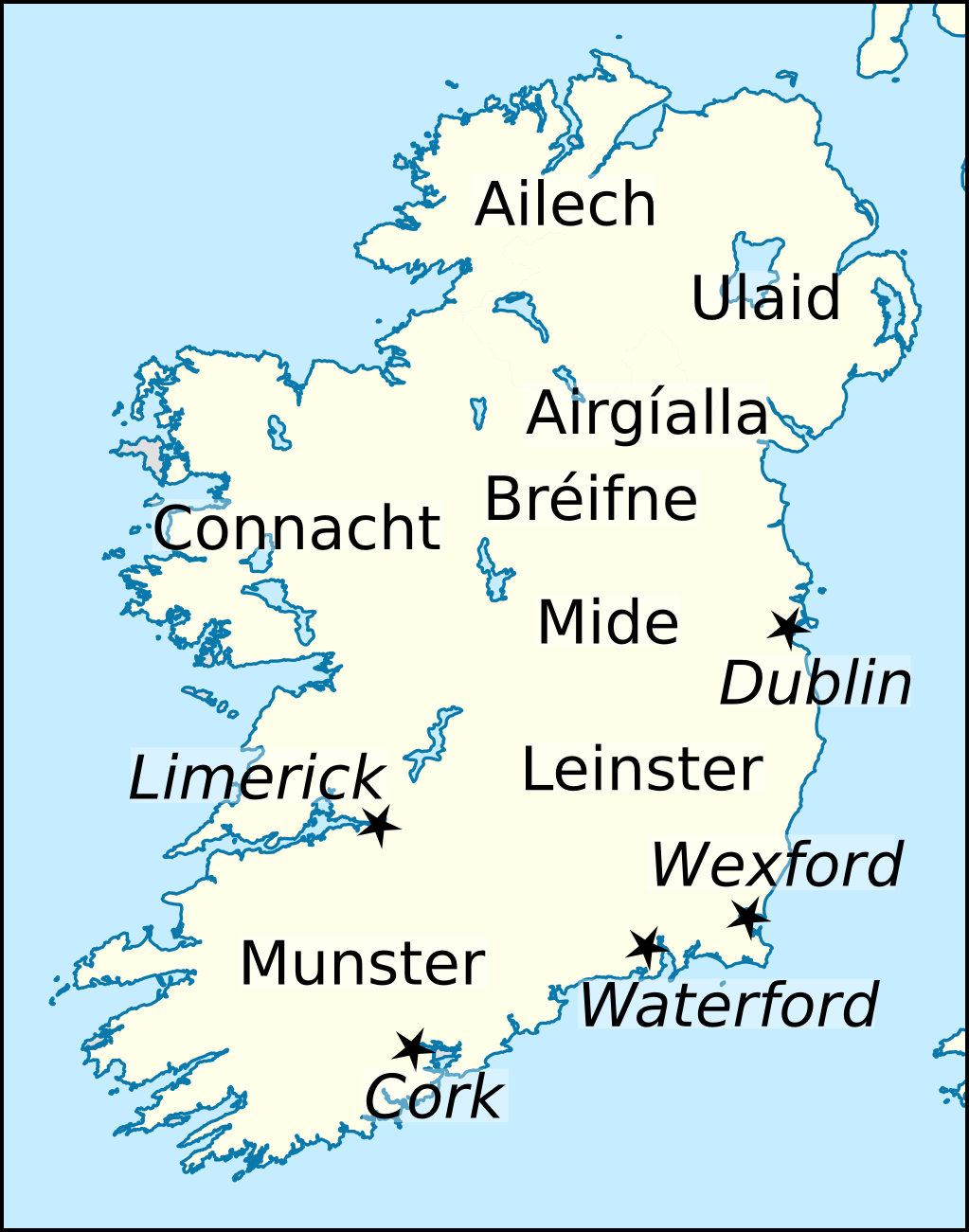
Locations of significant Norse-Gaelic settlements, including the Kingdom of Dublin, and major Irish kingdoms, including Kingdom of Munster.

Ragnall's father, a significant figure named Torcall, is mentioned by the sixteenth-century Annals of Loch Cé in 1133. Although Torcall's ancestry is uncertain, later sources suggest that his family—the Meic Torcaill—were a substantial landholding kindred in the region. (Note: A possible family predecessor may have been a certain Torcall mac Éola, whose slaying in Wales in 1093 is recorded by the eleventh- to fourteenth-century Annals of Inisfallen. It is possible that this man was the eponymous ancestor of the Meic Torcaill. A son of his may have been the Torfind mac Torcaill whose death in 1124 is recorded in both the fifteenth- to sixteenth-century Annals of Ulster, and the Annals of Loch Cé. Torcall mac Éola may have also been related to a certain twelfth-century Manx bishop, "Hamondus filius Iole", recorded by the thirteenth- to fourteenth-century Chronicle of Mann.) Torcall's rise to power seems to have occurred at about a time when Kingdom of Dublin was closely aligned with Diarmait Mac Murchada, King of Leinster. The latter lost control of Dublin in 1141, however, as the seventeenth-century Annals of the Four Masters reveals that the town was seized and held by Conchobar Ua Briain, overlord of Munster.

== Dublin ==
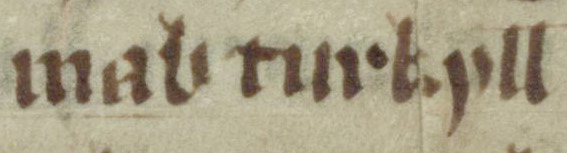
The name of a member of the Meic Torcaill—possibly Ragnall himself—as it appears on folio 71v of Oxford Jesus College 111 (the Red Book of Hergest): "mab turkyỻ".

Following Conchobar's ousting, the Annals of the Four Masters further indicates that the Dubliners installed a certain Islesman, Ottar mac meic Ottair, as King of Dublin in 1142. Two years later, Ottar, along with an unnamed member of the Meic Torcaill (who may well have been Ragnall himself) and an unnamed son of a certain Erulb, are noted in the context of mercenary operations in Wales by the thirteenth- and fourteenth-century texts Brenhinedd y Saesson and Brut y Tywysogyon, and the "B" and "C" versions of the eleventh- to thirteenth-century Annales Cambriæ. This episode seems to concern Dublin's military involvement in a Welsh factional dispute between Owain Gwynedd and Cadwaladr, sons of Gruffudd ap Cynan, King of Gwynedd. It was in the course of this inter-dynastic struggle that Cadwaladr sought assistance from Ireland. (Note: A piece of twelfth-century poetry, composed by Gwalchmai ap Meilyr, states that Owain utilised military assistance from Ireland and the Isles.) At one point, the sources report that the Dubliners demanded two thousand captives or cattle for their assistance, a pay-off that evinces the kingdom's interest in the continuing twelfth-century slave trade. Contemporary sources reveal that a desire to extinguish the Irish Sea slave trade was one of the reasons the English used to justify their twelfth-century conquests in Ireland.

== Death ==
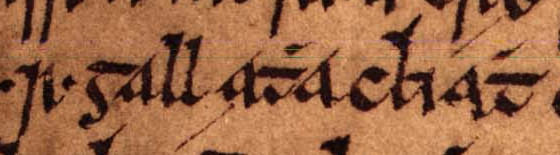
Ragnall's title as it appears on folio 23r of Oxford Bodleian Library Rawlinson B 488: "rí Gall Atha Clíath" ("king of the Gaill of Dublin").

Ragnall died in 1146. His slaying is reported by the fourteenth-century Annals of Tigernach, the twelfth-century Chronicon Scotorum, and the fifteenth-century Mac Carthaigh's Book. These sources accord Ragnall the title King of Dublin. If these accounts are to be believed, his reign would appear to have begun no earlier than 1144, and interrupted Ottar's reign. The Annals of the Four Masters, however, accords Ragnall the title mórmáer, which could indicate that he was merely a subordinate within Ottar's regime. (Note: This title is generally translated as "great steward". It is usually only found in a Scottish context, although one instance of the title in an Irish context is preserved by the eleventh- or twelfth-century Cogad Gáedel re Gallaib, in the form of a description of a follower of Brian Bóruma mac Cennétig, High King of Ireland. On the other hand, this particular occurrence may be merely an anachronism.) Ragnall's death appears to have occurred in the context of conflict with the inhabitants of East Meath. The record of his demise—and the Dubliners' part in the slaying of Cellach Ua Cellaig, King of Brega within the same year—may partly evince the apparent north-western expansion by the Dubliners in the twelfth-century. Although Ottar could well have enjoyed the cooperation of the Meic Torcaill in the early part of his reign, the Annals of Tigernach and Chronicon Scotorum reveal that they were responsible for his slaying in 1148.

== Descendants ==
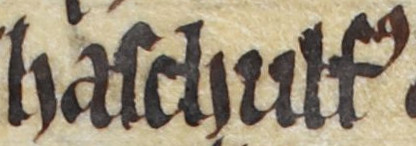
The name of Ragnall's son, Ascall, as it appears on folio 46v of British Library Royal 13 B VIII (Expugnatio Hibernica): "Hasculphus".

Ragnall had at least one son, Ascall, who ruled as king for a brief period in the last half of the century. Several decades before, the Annals of the Four Masters reports the death of a certain "mac Mic Turgaill" in 1138. If Ragnall was the leading representative of the family at this point in history, the fact that the deceased individual is not accorded any title could indicate that he was a son of Ragnall. Another possibility is that this man was instead a son of Torcall himself, or perhaps some other member of the Meic Torcaill. Another son of Ragnall may be a certain Ragnall mac Ragnaill, styled tigerna Gall ("lord of the foreigners"), who is stated by the Annals of the Four Masters to have attended the great assembly convened by Ruaidrí Ua Conchobair, High King of Ireland in 1167. The name and title of this Ragnall suggest that he was either an otherwise unattested son of Ragnaill mac Torcaill, or else an annalist's mistake for Ascall himself.
