= 1154 in Ireland =

- Centuries: 11th; 12th; 13th; 14th
- Decades: 1130s; 1140s; 1150s; 1160s; 1170s
- See also: Other events of 1154; List of years in Ireland

Events from the year 1154 in Ireland.

== Incumbents ==
- High King: Toirdelbach Ua Conchobair

== Events ==
- Abbeydorney Abbey, established by the Cistercian Order north of the modern village of Abbeydorney.
