= 1157 in Ireland =

- Centuries: 11th; 12th; 13th; 14th
- Decades: 1130s; 1140s; 1150s; 1160s; 1170s
- See also: Other events of 1157; List of years in Ireland

Events from the year 1157 in Ireland.

== Incumbents ==
- High King: Muirchertach Mac Lochlainn

== Events ==
- Completion and consecration of Mellifont Abbey, the first Cistercian foundation in Ireland.
- The earliest Irish land charter to survive is that of the grant in 1157 of land to the Cistercians in Newry, which lay in Uí Echach, by the High King Muirchertach Mac Lochlainn
