= Muiredach Ua Cobthaig =

Muiredach Ua Cobthaig, also known in Latin as Mauricius, was a medieval Irish bishop.

He was "Bishop of Cenel-Eogain and of all the North of Ireland" in the Annals of Ulster. Cobthaig was present at the Synod of Kells during March 1152. He died on 10 February 1173. .

Catholic Church titles
| Preceded by Ua Gormgaile | Bishops of Cinél nEógain before 1152-1173 | Succeeded by Amlaím Ua Muirethaig |
