= 1160 in Ireland =

- Centuries: 11th; 12th; 13th; 14th
- Decades: 1140s; 1150s; 1160s; 1170s; 1180s
- See also: Other events of 1160; List of years in Ireland

Events from the year 1160 in Ireland.

== Incumbents ==
- High King: Muirchertach Mac Lochlainn

== Events ==
- Jerpoint Abbey is founded in County Kilkenny.
- Earliest recorded reference to Dromcollogher - in the Book of Leinster.

== Deaths ==
- 17 December – Gilla na Naemh Ua Duinn, poet, historian and cleric (born 1102).
