= 1155 in Ireland =

- Centuries: 11th; 12th; 13th; 14th
- Decades: 1130s; 1140s; 1150s; 1160s; 1170s
- See also: Other events of 1155; List of years in Ireland

Events from the year 1155 in Ireland.

== Incumbents ==
- High King: Toirdelbach Ua Conchobair

== Events ==
- Pope Adrian IV issues the papal bull Laudabiliter, granting Henry II of England the right to rule Ireland, after Henry convinced the Pope that he was needed "to proclaim the truths of the Christian religion" to the Irish people.
