= 1152 in Ireland =

- Centuries: 11th; 12th; 13th; 14th
- Decades: 1130s; 1140s; 1150s; 1160s; 1170s
- See also: Other events of 1152; List of years in Ireland

Events from the year 1152 in Ireland.

== Incumbents ==
- High King: Toirdelbach Ua Conchobair

== Events ==
- Synod of Kells-Mellifont results in a national church organisation with four metropolitans (archbishoprics) and 36 sees, under the primacy of Armagh.
- The Archdiocese of Dublin, (Irish: Ard-Deoise Bhaile Átha Cliath), recognised as a metropolitan province in by the Synod of Kells.
- Diarmaid mac Murchadha elopes with Devorgill.
- Cloyne was recognised as a diocese at the Synod of Kells
