= 1169 in Ireland =

- Centuries: 11th; 12th; 13th; 14th
- Decades: 1140s; 1150s; 1160s; 1170s; 1180s
- See also: Other events of 1169; List of years in Ireland

Events from the year 1169 in Ireland.

== Events ==
- 1 May – Norman invasion of Ireland starts with the arrival at Bannow Bay in Leinster of Norman military leaders Robert Fitz-Stephen, Maurice FitzGerald and others including Cambro-Norman knight (and vassal of Henry II of England) Richard de Clare ("Strongbow") who has made an alliance with exiled Irish chief Diarmait Mac Murchada to help him regain the throne of Leinster. Wexford, Waterford, Dublin and the Kingdom of Ossory are taken and Mac Murchada restored as King of Leinster.
