= 1156 in Ireland =

- Centuries: 11th; 12th; 13th; 14th
- Decades: 1130s; 1140s; 1150s; 1160s; 1170s
- See also: Other events of 1156; List of years in Ireland

Events from the year 1156 in Ireland.

== Incumbents ==
- High King: Toirdelbach Ua Conchobair (died) then Muirchertach Mac Lochlainn

== Events ==
- Ruaidrí Ua Conchobair becomes King of Connacht
- Great freeze of winter.

== Deaths ==
- Tairrdelbach Ua Conchobair (Turlough O’Connor), who had reigned as King of Connacht since 1106 and was a claimant to the High Kingship of Ireland. He was buried in Clonmacnoise.
