= 1162 in Ireland =

- Centuries: 11th; 12th; 13th; 14th
- Decades: 1140s; 1150s; 1160s; 1170s; 1180s
- See also: Other events of 1162; List of years in Ireland

Events from the year 1162 in Ireland.

== Incumbents ==
- High King: Muirchertach Mac Lochlainn

== Events ==
- Lorcán Ua Tuathail (St Laurence O'Toole) elected as Archbishop of Dublin.
- Synod of Ireland held at Clane.

== Deaths ==
- Macraith Ua Macliag, chief of Cinel-Lughna.
- Cosnamhaigh Ua Dubhda, lord of Ui-Amhalghadha.
