= 1166 in Ireland =

- Centuries: 11th; 12th; 13th; 14th
- Decades: 1140s; 1150s; 1160s; 1170s; 1180s
- See also: Other events of 1166; List of years in Ireland

Events from the year 1166 in Ireland.

== Incumbents ==
- High King: Muirchertach Mac Lochlainn then Ruaidrí Ua Conchobair

== Events ==
- Muirchertach Mac Lochlainn, High King of Ireland, arranges a truce with his neighbours, taking hostages from many families in Ulster, but, in violation of an oath for good behaviour, has Eochaid mac Con Ulad Mac Duinn Sléibe, King of Ulster, seized and blinded. In return, he is killed. Ruaidrí Ua Conchobair takes the high-kingship.
- Diarmait Mac Murchada, King of Leinster, is driven from his kingdom by Tigernán Ua Ruairc and Ruaidrí Ua Conchobair across the Irish Sea, seeks the help of Henry II of England and recruits Norman knights.

== Deaths ==
- Muirchertach Mac Lochlainn, High King of Ireland
