= Clonard =

Clonard (also Cluain Iraird, as in Curiate Italian) may refer to:

== Republic of Ireland ==
- Clonard, County Meath, a village in County Meath, Ireland
  - Clonard Abbey, an early medieval monastery
    - Roman Catholic Diocese of Clonard, a medieval diocese until its 1202 suppression
- Clonard, a suburb of Wexford town

== Northern Ireland ==
- Clonard Monastery, a Catholic church and monastery in Belfast
- Clonard, Belfast, an electoral ward of West Belfast

== People ==
- Clonard Keating (1871–1898), Nova Scotian military officer
- Finnian of Clonard (470–549), early Irish monastic saint who founded Clonard Abbey
- Tola of Clonard (7th century), Irish Roman Catholic saint

=== Titles ===
- Abbot of Clonard, monastic head of Clonard Abbey
- Bishop of Clonard, 11th–12th century episcopal title of the Bishops of Meath

== Other uses ==
- Clonard College, a girls secondary school in Geelong, Australia
