= Ascall mac Ragnaill =

King of Dublin from 1160 to 1170

- King of Dublin
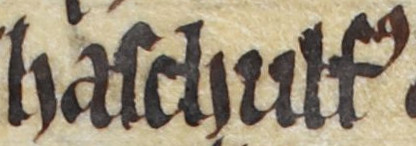
- Ascall's name as it appears on folio 46v of British Library Royal 13 B VIII (Expugnatio Hibernica): "Hasculphus".
- Reign: 1160–1170
- Predecessor: Brodar mac Torcaill
- Born: 1124
- Died: 16 May 1171 (aged 46–47); Dublin
- House: Meic Torcaill
- Father: Ragnall mac Torcaill

Ascall mac Ragnaill meic Torcaill (1124 – 16 May 1171), also known as Ascall Mac Torcaill, (Note: Since the 1990s, academics have accorded Ascall various personal names in English secondary sources: Ascall, Asculf, Asgall, Áskell, Askulf, Askuluw, Askulv, Hasculf, Haskulf, and Höskuld. Likewise, academics have accorded Ascall various patronyms and surnames in English secondary sources: Ascall mac Raghnaill mic Thurcaill, Ascall mac Ragnaill, Ascall mac Ragnaill meic Torcaill, Ascall mac Ragnaill mic Turcaill, Ascall Mac Torcaill, Ascall Mac Turcaill, Ascall mac Turcaill, Asculf mac Torcaill, Asculf Mac Torcaill, Asgall mac Torcaill, Asgall Mac Turcaill, Áskell Ragavalsson, Askulf Mac Turcaill, Askulf mac Turcaill, Hasculf Mac Thorkil, and Haskulf Thorgilsson. The various forms in which Ascall's name is recorded in primary sources, such as La Geste des Engleis en Yrlande and Expugnatio Hibernica, may be evidence that his name corresponds to the Old Norse Höskollr or Askülfr, rather than Áskell. For example, the former source gives "MacTurkil Esculf", and "Hesculf", whilst the latter source gives "Hasculphus". Another possibility is that the names recorded in the two sources represent the Old English Æscwulf.) was the last Norse-Gaelic king of Dublin. He was a member of the Meic Torcaill, a Dublin family of significance since the early twelfth century.

Control of the wealthy coastal kingdom was bitterly contested during Ascall's floruit, with members of his immediate family, as well as Islesmen and Irishmen, all securing power for brief periods of time. Throughout much of this period, however, the overlord of Dublin was Diarmait Mac Murchada, King of Leinster. In 1166, after the death of his close ally Muirchertach Mac Lochlainn, High King of Ireland, Mac Murchada was beset by his enemies. At this critical point of his reign, Mac Murchada lost the support of the Dubliners, which contributed to his expulsion from Ireland that year. Not long afterwards, however, he made his return with significant military assistance from mercenary English adventurers. In the latter half of 1170, Dublin itself fell to the combined forces of Mac Murchada and the powerful English magnate Richard de Clare, Earl of Pembroke.

With the collapse of the Norse-Gaelic kingdom, Ascall and the Dublin elite were forced to flee into what one source calls the "northern islands", a reference to either the Kingdom of the Isles or the Earldom of Orkney. About a year later, not long after Mac Murchada's death, Ascall attempted to regain his patrimony from the English. Unfortunately for himself, his invasion of Dublin ended in utter failure, and he was executed by the English governor of the town. Immediately following his fall, Dublin was besieged by a combined force of Irishmen and Islesmen. The town, however, remained firmly in the hands of the English; and before the end of the year, Dublin passed into the direct control of Henry II, King of England, who converted it into an English royal town.

== Background ==
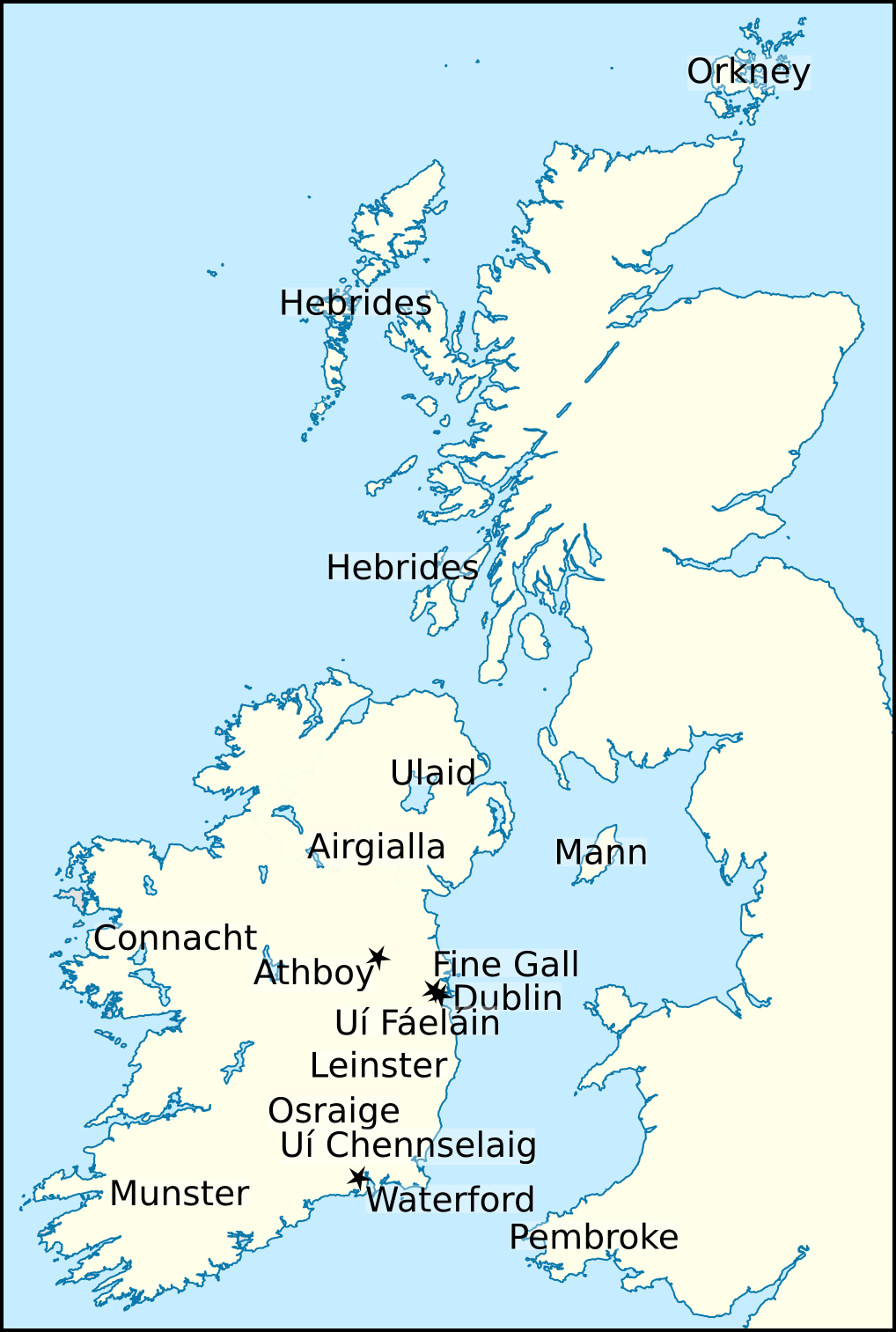
Locations relating to Ascall's life and times.

Ascall's father was Ragnall mac Torcaill, a man who may well have ruled as King of Dublin. The men were members of the Meic Torcaill, a substantial landholding kindred in the kingdom. Several members of this Norse-Gaelic family held the kingship in the twelfth century. One such man was Ascall's uncle, Brodar mac Torcaill, King of Dublin, who was slain in 1160.

At the midpoint of the twelfth century, the kingdom was under the overlordship of Diarmait Mac Murchada, King of Leinster. The latter's ultimate overking, however, was Muirchertach Mac Lochlainn, King of Cenél nEógain. The year after Brodar's death, numerous sources indicate that Mac Murchada, with a force of Dubliners in tow, formally rendered submission to Mac Lochlainn. (Note: Sources such as the Annals of the Four Masters, the Annals of Tigernach, and the Annals of Ulster.) In 1162, the fifteenth- to sixteenth-century Annals of Ulster reveals that Mac Murchada gained an almost-unprecedented authority over Dublin. (Note: It was likely Mac Murchada's domination of the Norse-Gaelic enclaves of Dublin and Wexford that earned him the sobriquet Diarmait na nGall ("Diarmait of the Foreigners"), rather than his later employment of English troops.) There is reason to suspect that his success stemmed from assistance received from Mac Lochlainn. The latter, for example, is recorded by the same source to have laid siege to the town within the year. This military campaign may have been undertaken to counter the Dubliners' attempt to install Gofraid mac Amlaíb, King of the Isles to the kingship of Dublin, as recounted by the thirteenth- to fourteenth-century Chronicle of Mann. (Note: On the other hand, this episode concerning Gofraid and the Dubliners may have taken place in 1156/1157.)

The record of events during the mid part of the twelfth century suggests that Leinster-based overkings of Dublin enjoyed the cooperation of the indigenous leaders of Dublin, and the emergence of the Meic Torcaill during this period may well fit into such a context. When an indigenous ruler was not to be found, however, the Dubliners seem to have sought leadership from the Isles, rather than endure a non-Leinster overking, as evidenced by the attempt to install Gofraid. (Note: The Dubliners, therefore, appear to have preferred rulers of Norse-Gaelic descent.) Mac Murchada's considerable authority in Dublin at this point is evidenced by several ecclesiastical grants, foundations, and appointments. Furthermore, two major military operations undertaken by Dublin's forces in 1164 and 1165 may have been conducted under Mac Murchada's authority. The latter campaign, recorded by the Annals of Ulster, and the thirteenth- and fourteenth-century texts Brut y Tywysogyon and Brenhinedd y Saesson, concerned naval manoeuvres off Wales, in the service of Henry II, King of England. The former campaign, recorded by the Annals of Ulster, consisted of involvement in the ill-fated invasion of mainland Scotland, launched by Somairle mac Gilla Brigte, King of the Isles.

== Fall of Mac Murchada and rise of Ua Conchobair ==
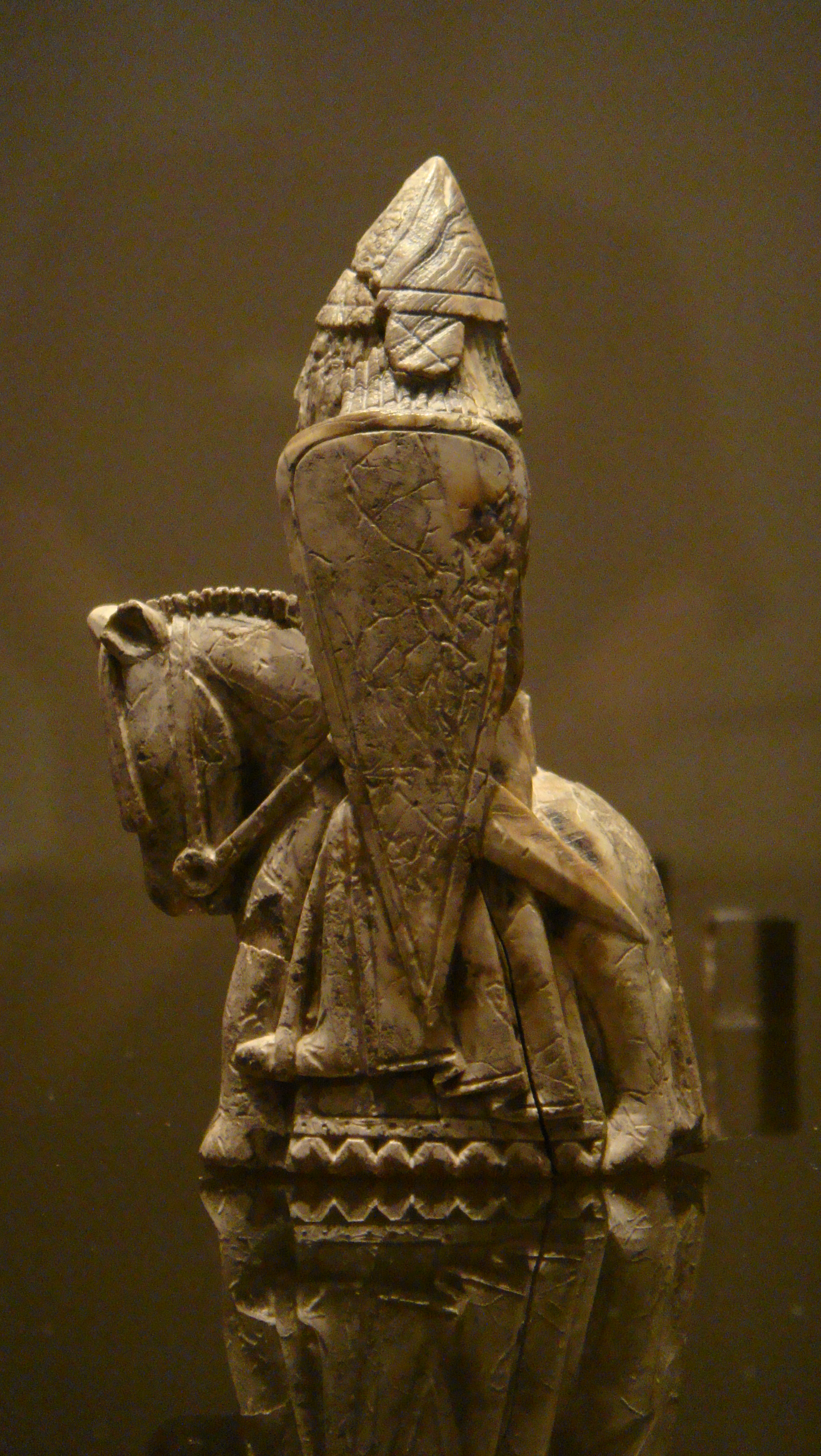
A knight gaming piece of the so-called Lewis chessmen. In 1167, 1,000 mounted warriors from Dublin are said to have attended an assembly convened by the High King of Ireland.

Mac Lochlainn was slain in 1166, leaving Mac Murchada to fend off his own enemies alone. Other than Mac Murchada himself, another man making a bid for the high-kingship was Ruaidrí Ua Conchobair, King of Connacht. Within the same year as Mac Lochlainn's demise, Ua Conchobair and his allies expelled Mac Murchada from not only Dublin, but Ireland altogether. As such, Ua Conchobair was duly recognised as High King of Ireland.

According to the seventeenth-century Annals of the Four Masters, he had secured the cooperation of Dublin, and perhaps gained the kingship of the town itself, through a stipend of 4,000 cows. (Note: The following passages from a mid twelfth-century poem appear to encapsulate the sentiments of the contemporary Irish who endured the substantial financial burdens required for the sustentation of the warbands of their kings: "... iniquitous law and great arrogance in kings ... wicked lords likewise ... the needy, transitory king will subdue the miserable husbandman".) In consequence, Dubliners formed part of Ua Conchobair's forces when he marched to Drogheda and Leinster, where he forced the submissions of the kings of Airgialla and Leinster respectively. In fact, Dublin appears to have formed a key part of Ua Conchobair's arsenal, and it is apparent that Mac Murchada was doomed without the support of this coastal kingdom. Certainly, the twelfth- to thirteenth-century La Geste des Engleis en Yrlande relates that Ascall ("MacTurkyl de Diveline") had abandoned his former overlord, and the eleventh- to fourteenth-century Annals of Inisfallen specify that Mac Murchada was only expulsed from Ireland after the Leinstermen and Dubliners had turned against him. Although Ua Conchobair appears to have allowed Mac Murchada to retain his patrimonial lordship of Uí Chennselaig, the Annals of the Four Masters reveals that the Leinstermen and Dubliners assisted Tigernán Ua Ruairc, King of Bréifne in forcing Mac Murchada from this final vestige of authority and into exile.

The following year, Ua Conchobair convened a great assembly at Athboy. The Annals of the Four Masters states that 13,000 horsemen attended the meeting — 1,000 of which were supplied from Dublin. One of the many rulers recorded to have attended this gathering is a certain Ragnall mac Ragnaill, styled tigerna Gall ("lord of the foreigners"). The latter's name and title suggest that he was either an otherwise unattested brother of Ascall, or else an annalist's mistake for Ascall himself.

Meanwhile, after his expulsion from Ireland, Mac Murchada sought out Henry on the Continent, and gained permission to recruit military aid from the latter's subjects. In the autumn of 1167, Mac Murchada and his English allies arrived in Ireland, where they established themselves at Ferns. Ua Conchobair responded by penetrating Uí Chennselaig in a campaign, recounted by the fourteenth-century Annals of Tigernach, that included military support from Dublin. With Mac Murchada temporarily kept in check, a preoccupied Ua Conchobair allowed him to hold onto at least part of his patrimony.

== Arrival of the English and Dublin's fall ==
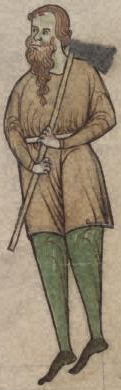
Depiction of Diarmait Mac Murchada, on folio 56r of National Library of Ireland 700 (Expugnatio Hibernica), dating to circa 1200. (Note: Scholars sometimes use the term "Ostmen" to denote the Dubliners and other Norse-Gaelic people of Ireland. The earliest form of the term in an Irish context dates to about 1173, several years after the English conquest of Ireland's Norse-Gaelic settlements. The term, therefore, may well have been originally introduced by the conquering English incomers. In any case, the name still exists today as Oxmantown, an area of modern-day Dublin. According to the twelfth-century Topographia Hibernica, the Irish utilised battle-axes in warfare, having originally adopted them from the Ostmen. This claim is backed up by archaeology, since contemporary Irish specimens are clearly based upon Norse axes. At one point, Expugnatio Hibernica advises the English that they "must never grow careless of the axes of the Irish".)

The situation in Ireland remained relatively unchanged until the arrival of a significant force of mercenaries in the summer of 1169, after which some of Mac Murchada's former vassals began to come over to his side. According to La Geste des Engleis en Yrlande, however, the kings of Uí Fáeláin and Osraige, and Ascall—described by this source as the "lord" of Dublin—stubbornly refused to support Mac Murchada's cause. In an apparent show of force that may have been designed to keep the Dubliners onside, the Annals of the Four Masters states that Ua Conchobair led an army to Tara, where he was joined by the forces of the kings of Ulaid and Airgialla, after which the combined army marched upon Dublin. The following year, however, saw the arrival of even more English support for Mac Murchada; and in August 1170, Richard de Clare, Earl of Pembroke landed in Ireland and took Waterford by storm.

Soon after, Clare married Mac Murchada's daughter, Aoife (or Aífe), and effectively became heir to the kingship of Leinster and the overlordship of Dublin. Unsurprisingly, later in September, the combined forces of Mac Murchada and Clare marched on Dublin, where they confronted Ua Conchobair and his forces.

If the account of the Annals of the Four Masters is to be believed, the Dubliners switched sides at this point, deserted the cause of Ua Conchobair, and further suffered an act of divine justice as their town went up in flames. (Note: Similarly, the Annals of Tigernach also note the firing of Dublin, although this source states that the Norse-Gaels assented to the burning, and sided with Mac Murchada against Ua Conchobair, whereupon the latter retired to Connacht without having battled.) On the other hand, the twelfth-century Expugnatio Hibernica specifies that, whilst negotiations were under way between the forces of Ua Conchobair and the coalition of Mac Murchada and Clare, an English force under the command of Miles de Cogan and Raymond le Gros successfully assaulted the town, and caused considerable carnage amongst the inhabitants. Although the Annals of the Four Masters specifies that the Dubliners were slaughtered in their fortress, after which the English carried off their cattle and goods, the Expugnatio Hibernica instead states that the majority of the Dubliners escaped the massacre and retained most of their possessions. The same source states that Ascall and the Dubliners managed to escape into the "northern islands". This term could well refer to Orkney. (Note: Orkney is located in a chain of islands known as the Northern Isles. In Old Norse, these islands were known as Norðreyjar, as opposed to the Isles (the Hebrides and Mann), which were known as Suðreyjar ("Southern Islands").) On the other hand, it is also possible that the term refers to the Hebrides or Mann; if so, this source would appear to be evidence that the Dubliners had retained close links with the Isles. According to the version of events preserved by La Geste des Engleis en Yrlande, the coalition's conquest of Dublin took place on 21 September.

== Final defeat and death ==
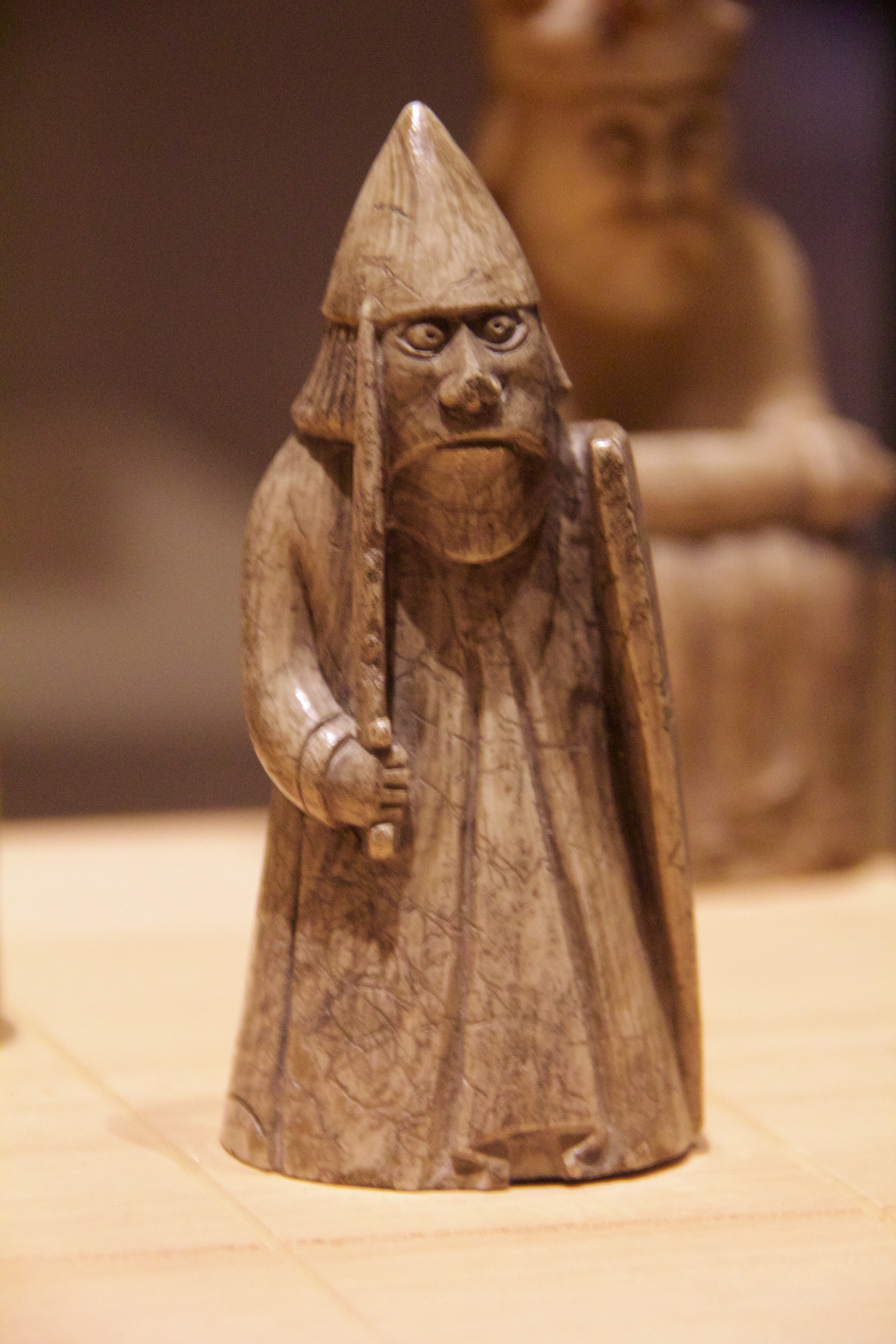
A rook gaming piece of the so-called Lewis chessmen. The near-contemporary Expugnatio Hibernica describes the men who followed Ascall in his ill-fated final attack as "iron-hearted as well as iron-armed". (Note: The Lewis chessmen depict warriors armed with kite shields. This type began to replace circular shields in the eleventh century, although the date of its adoption in Ireland is uncertain. According to Expugnatio Hibernica the troops who supported Ascall's cause in this action were "armed in the Danish fashion, some having long breast-plates, and others shirts of mail; their shields were round, and coloured red, and were bound about with iron". Such shields may have been favoured for maritime operations.)

Within weeks of Mac Murchada's death at the beginning of May, the Expugnatio Hibernica reveals that Ascall made his return to Dublin. The account of events recorded by the Expugnatio Hibernica and La Geste des Engleis en Yrlande indicate that Ascall's forces consisted of heavily armoured Islesmen and Norwegians. The former source numbers Ascall's forces at sixty ships, whilst the latter gives one hundred. According to both sources, Ascall's followers included a notable warrior named "John the Mad", a figure who may or may not be identical to the Orcadian saga-character Sveinn Ásleifarson. (Note: La Geste des Engleis en Yrlande names Ascall's commander as "Johan le devé", which translates to "John the Wode" or "John the Mad". Expugnatio Hibernica describes him as "Johanne agnomine þe Wode, quod Latine sonat Insano, vel Vehementi, viri bellicosi ...", in which the nickname has also been interpreted as "mad". The Annals of Ulster name him as "Eoan Mear", which likewise translates to "John the Mad". According to the twelfth- to thirteenth-century Orkneyinga saga, Sveinn was slain whilst raiding in Ireland at some point between 1165 and 1180.)

According to La Geste des Engleis en Yrlande, the invaders made landfall at the "Steine", located on the southern bank of the River Liffey, and proceeded to encamp themselves outside the town's walls. The Expugnatio Hibernica relates that they assaulted the walls of the eastern gate, a location that corresponds to St Mary's Gate, the focus of assault identified by La Geste des Engleis en Yrlande. Unfortunately for Ascall, the operation was an utter failure that resulted in his capture and death. Both sources relate that the town's defenders, led by Cogan and his brother Richard, successfully repulsed the invaders, slew John, and captured Ascall as he fled to his fleet. The Expugnatio Hibernica reveals that Ascall's was to be spared and he had already paid a large ransom, but both this source, and La Geste des Engleis en Yrlande, report that Ascall was beheaded anyway on account of his vows to soon return with far more soldiers, retake his kingdom, and take bloody revenge against the Norman invaders. (Note: Ascall's capture and execution are not documented in the Irish sources that mark his downfall. Sources such as the Annals of the Four Masters, the Annals of Ulster, the sixteenth-century Annals of Loch Cé, the Annals of Tigernach, and the fifteenth-century Mac Carthaigh's Book. These sources, instead, briefly report his demise in the context of defeat.)

== Legacy ==
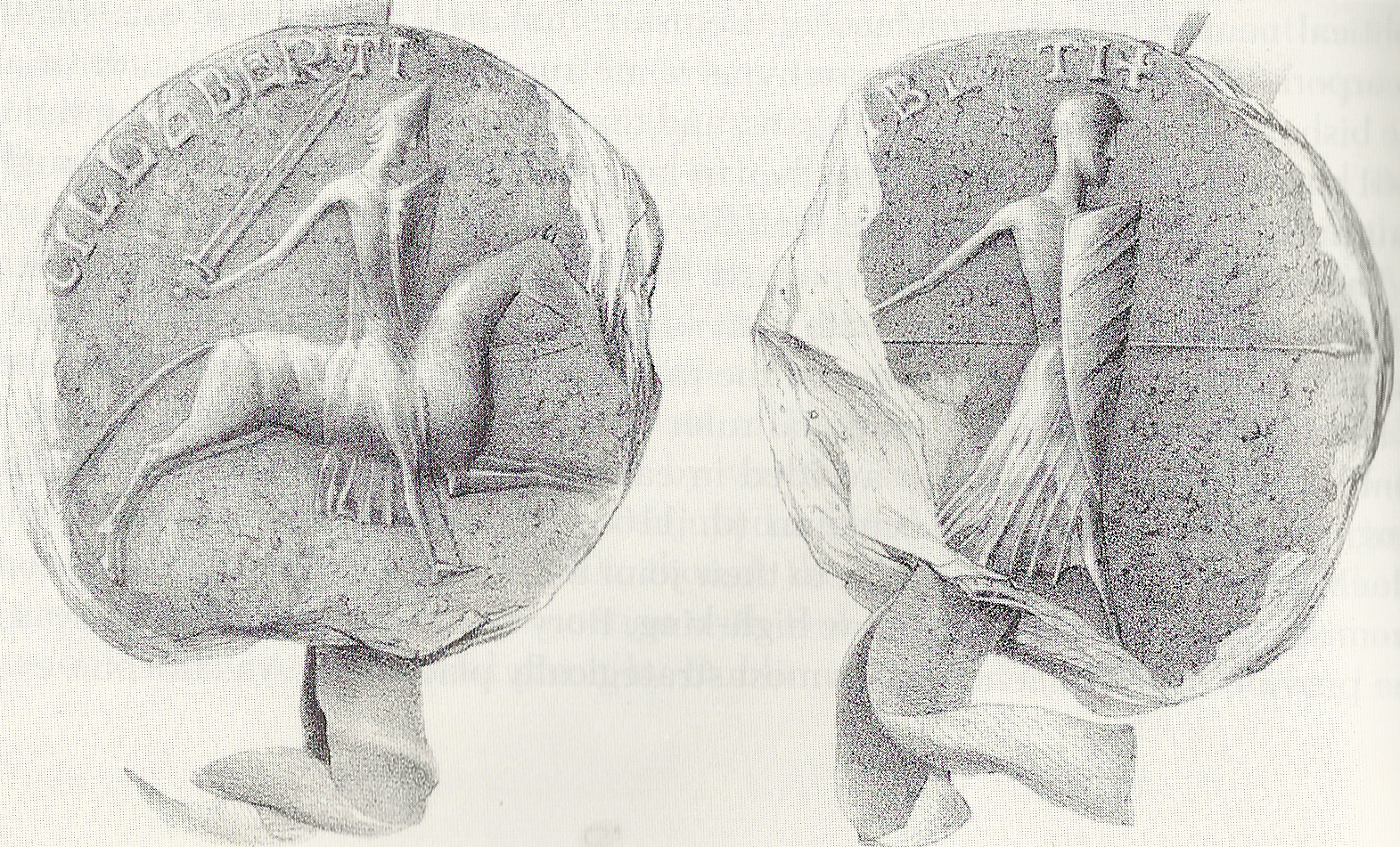
Seal of Richard de Clare, Earl of Pembroke. The device depicts a contemporary mounted knight and footsoldier. (Note: In contemporary or near contemporary sources, the incoming warriors recruited by Mac Murchada are overwhelmingly described as English. For example, Expugnatio Hibernica almost always describes them as English; so too does La Geste des Engleis en Yrlande, a source which uses the term "English" about eighty times, whilst using "French", "Flemings", and "Normans" in only one particular line. Despite the modern employment of terms such as "Normans", "Anglo-Normans" (itself an eighteenth-century construct), and "Cambro-Normans", contemporary sources virtually never use "Norman" in an Irish context. In fact, the term Normannaigh is never used by the Irish annals. Irish sources usually describe the men as "foreigners" and "grey foreigners", or else as Saxain ("Saxons" or "English"). In consequence, it is apparent that contemporaries regarded the incomers as English. In the nineteenth century, however, during a period of intense and sensitive political debate, the term was dropped by historians and replaced with ahistorical terms. Even amongst modern historians, there is still a reluctance to use "English".)

The successive deaths of Mac Murchada and Ascall appear to have left a power vacuum in Dublin that others strived to fill. Immediately after Ascall's fall, Ua Conchobair had the English-controlled town besieged. The Expugnatio Hibernica records that the High King and St. Lorcán Ua Tuathail, Archbishop of Dublin sent for Gofraid and others in the Isles, asking them to blockade Dublin harbour by sea. According to the aforesaid source, "the threat of English domination, inspired by the successes of the English, made the men of the Isles act all the more quickly, and with the wind in the north-west they immediately sailed about thirty ships full of warriors into the harbour of the Liffey". Unfortunately for the Irish, Islesmen, and Dubliners, the blockade was ultimately a failure, and Dublin remained firmly in the hands of the English. Ascall was the last Norse-Gaelic King of Dublin. Before the end of the year, Clare relinquished possession to his own liege lord, Henry, who converted it into an English royal town.

There is evidence post-dating Ascall's fall revealing that he gifted the church of St Brigid, and its surrounding lands, to the priory of the Holy Trinity (Christ Church Cathedral). A gardha or garð—Gaelic and Old Norse terms for a peasant settlement—is stated to have belonged to Ascall by Dublin's western gate. By 1190, the city gate at Nicholas Street was known in the Anglo-Norman language as porte Hasculf.

== Sources ==
=== Primary sources ===
- Anderson, J; Hjaltalin, JA; Goudie, G, eds. (1873). The Orkneyinga Saga. Edinburgh: Edmonston and Douglas.
- Anderson, AO, ed. (1922). Early Sources of Scottish History, A.D. 500 to 1286. Vol. 2. London: Oliver and Boyd.
- "Annals of Inisfallen". Corpus of Electronic Texts (23 October 2008 ed.). University College Cork. 2008.
- "Annals of Inisfallen". Corpus of Electronic Texts (16 February 2010 ed.). University College Cork. 2010.
- "Annals of Loch Cé". Corpus of Electronic Texts (13 April 2005 ed.). University College Cork. 2005.
- "Annals of Loch Cé". Corpus of Electronic Texts (5 September 2008 ed.). University College Cork. 2008.
- "Annals of the Four Masters". Corpus of Electronic Texts (3 December 2013 ed.). University College Cork. 2013a.
- "Annals of the Four Masters". Corpus of Electronic Texts (16 December 2013 ed.). University College Cork. 2013b.
- "Annals of Tigernach". Corpus of Electronic Texts (13 April 2005 ed.). University College Cork. 2005.
- Dimock, JF, ed. (1867). Giraldi Cambrensis Opera. Rerum Britannicarum Medii Ævi Scriptores. Vol. 5. London: Longmans, Green, Reader, and Dyer.
- Jones, O; Williams, E; Pughe, WO, eds. (1870). The Myvyrian Archaiology of Wales. Denbigh: Thomas Gee. OL 6930827M.
- Knott, E (1958). "A Poem of Prophesies". Ériu. 18: 55–84. eISSN 2009-0056. ISSN 0332-0758. JSTOR 30007335.
- "Mac Carthaigh's Book". Corpus of Electronic Texts (23 March 2010 ed.). University College Cork. 2010a.
- "Mac Carthaigh's Book". Corpus of Electronic Texts (23 March 2010 ed.). University College Cork. 2010b.
- Munch, PA; Goss, A, eds. (1874). Chronica Regvm Manniæ et Insvlarvm: The Chronicle of Man and the Sudreys. Vol. 1. Douglas, IM: Manx Society.
- "National Library of Ireland MS 700". Irish Script on Screen. Dublin Institute for Advanced Studies. n.d.
- Rhŷs, J; Evans, JG, eds. (1890). The Text of the Bruts From the Red Book of Hergest. Oxford. OL 19845420M.
- "Royal MS 13 B VIII". British Library. n.d.
- Scott, AB; Martin, FX, eds. (1978). Expugnatio Hibernica: The Conquest of Ireland. Dublin: Royal Irish Academy.
- "Song of Dermot and the Earl". Corpus of Electronic Texts (27 April 2010 ed.). University College Cork. 2010.
- "Song of Dermot and the Earl". Corpus of Electronic Texts (24 February 2011 ed.). University College Cork. 2011.
- "The Annals of Tigernach". Corpus of Electronic Texts (2 November 2010 ed.). University College Cork. 2010.
- "The Annals of Ulster". Corpus of Electronic Texts (29 August 2008 ed.). University College Cork. 2008.
- "The Annals of Ulster". Corpus of Electronic Texts (15 August 2012 ed.). University College Cork. 2012.
- The Twentieth Report of the Deputy Keeper of the Public Records and Keeper of the State Papers in Ireland. Dublin: Her Majesty's Stationery Office. 1888.
- Vigfusson, G, ed. (1887). Icelandic Sagas and Other Historical Documents Relating to the Settlements and Descents of the Northmen on the British Isles. Rerum Britannicarum Medii Ævi Scriptores. Vol. 1. London: Her Majesty's Stationery Office. OL 16401290M.
- Williams Ab Ithel, J, ed. (1860). Brut y Tywysigion; or, The Chronicle of the Princes. Rerum Britannicarum Medii Ævi Scriptores. London: Longman, Green, Longman, and Roberts. OL 24776516M.
- Wright, T; Forester, T; Hoare, RC, eds. (1905). The Historical Works of Giraldus Cambrensis. London: George Bell & Sons.

=== Secondary sources ===
- Barrett, J (2004). "Swein Asleiffson (d. 1171?)". Oxford Dictionary of National Biography (online ed.). Oxford University Press. doi:10.1093/ref:odnb/49359. (Subscription, Wikipedia Library access or UK public library membership required.)
- Bartlett, T (2010). Ireland: A History. Cambridge: Cambridge University Press. ISBN 978-0-521-19720-5.
- Bugge, A (1904). "Bidrag til det Sidste Afsnit af Nordboernes Historie i Irland". Aarbøger for Nordisk Oldkyndighed og Histori. 19: 248–315.
- Byrne, FJ (2008) [2005]. "Ireland and Her Neighbours, c.1014–c.1072". In Ó Cróinín, D (ed.). Prehistoric and Early Ireland. New History of Ireland. Oxford: Oxford University Press. pp. 862–898. ISBN 978-0-19-821737-4.
- Byrne, FJ (2008) [1987]. "The Trembling Sod: Ireland in 1169". In Cosgrove, A (ed.). Medieval Ireland, 1169–1534. New History of Ireland. Oxford: Oxford University Press. pp. 1–42. ISBN 978-0-19-821755-8.
- Clarke, HB (1993). "The 1192 Charter of Liberties and the Beginnings of Dublin's Municipal Life". Dublin Historical Record. 46 (1): 5–14. ISSN 0012-6861. JSTOR 30101018.
- Crooks, P (2005). "Mac Murchada, Diarmait". In Duffy, S (ed.). Medieval Ireland: An Encyclopedia. New York: Routledge. pp. 299–302. ISBN 0-415-94052-4.
- Davies, S (2014) [2004]. War and Society in Medieval Wales, 633–1283: Welsh Military Institutions. Cardiff: University of Wales Press. ISBN 978-1-78316-139-3.
- Doherty, C (2005). "Naval Warfare". In Duffy, S (ed.). Medieval Ireland: An Encyclopedia. New York: Routledge. pp. 352–353. ISBN 0-415-94052-4.
- Downham, C (2005). "Viking Incursions". In Duffy, S (ed.). Medieval Ireland: An Encyclopedia. New York: Routledge. pp. 502–504. ISBN 0-415-94052-4.
- Downham, C (2007). "Living on the Edge: Scandinavian Dublin in the Twelfth Century". In Smith, BB; Taylor, S; Williams, G (eds.). West Over Sea: Studies in Scandinavian Sea-Borne Expansion and Settlement Before 1300. The Northern World: North Europe and the Baltic c. 400–1700 AD. Peoples, Economics and Cultures. Leiden: Brill. pp. 33–52. ISBN 978-90-04-15893-1. ISSN 1569-1462.
- Downham, C (2013). "Living on the Edge: Scandinavian Dublin in the Twelfth Century". No Horns on Their Helmets? Essays on the Insular Viking-Age. Celtic, Anglo-Saxon, and Scandinavian Studies. Aberdeen: Centre for Anglo-Saxon Studies and The Centre for Celtic Studies, University of Aberdeen. pp. 157–178. ISBN 978-0-9557720-1-6. ISSN 2051-6509.
- Duffy, S (1992). "Irishmen and Islesmen in the Kingdoms of Dublin and Man, 1052–1171". Ériu. 43: 93–133. eISSN 2009-0056. ISSN 0332-0758. JSTOR 30007421.
- Duffy, S (1993). Ireland and the Irish Sea Region, 1014–1318 (PhD thesis). Trinity College, Dublin. hdl:2262/77137.
- Duffy, S (1997). Ireland in the Middle Ages. British History in Perspective. Houndmills, Basingstoke: Macmillan Press. doi:10.1007/978-1-349-25171-1. ISBN 978-1-349-25171-1.
- Duffy, S (1998). "Ireland's Hastings: The Anglo-Norman Conquest of Dublin". In Harper-Bill, C (ed.). Anglo-Norman Studies. Vol. 20. Woodbridge: The Boydell Press. pp. 69–85. ISBN 0-85115-573-1. ISSN 0954-9927.
- Duffy, S (2005a). "A Reconsideration of the Site of Dublin's Viking Thing-Mót". In Condit, T; Corlett, C (eds.). Above and Beyond: Essays in Memory of Leo Swan. Dublin: Wordwell. pp. 351–360.
- Duffy, S (2005b). "Town and Crown: The Kings of England and Their City of Dublin". In Prestwich, M; Britnell, R; Frame, R (eds.). Proceedings of the Durham Conference, 2003. Thirteenth Century England. Woodbridge: The Boydell Press. pp. 95–117. ISBN 1-84383-122-8. ISSN 0269-6967.
- Duffy, S (2007a). "Henry II and England's Insular Neighbours". In Harper-Bill, C; Vincent, N (eds.). Henry II: New Interpretations. Woodbridge: The Boydell Press. pp. 129–153. ISBN 978-1-84383-340-6.
- Duffy, S (2007b). "The Prehistory of the Galloglass". In Duffy, S (ed.). The World of the Galloglass: Kings, Warlords and Warriors in Ireland and Scotland, 1200–1600. Dublin: Four Courts Press. pp. 1–23. ISBN 978-1-85182-946-0.
- Duffy, S (2011). "Anglo-Norman Invasion of Ireland (1169–1171)". The Encyclopedia of War. Blackwell Publishing. pp. 1–4. doi:10.1002/9781444338232.wbeow024. ISBN 9781444338232.
- Duffy, S (2015) [1997]. "Dublin, Kingdom of". In Crowcroft, R; Cannon, J (eds.). The Oxford Companion to British History (2nd ed.). Oxford University Press. doi:10.1093/acref/9780199677832.001.0001. ISBN 978-0-19-967783-2 – via Oxford Reference.
- Edmonds, F (2014). "Saints' Cults and Gaelic-Scandinavian Influence Around the Cumberland Coast and North of the Solway Firth". In Sigurðsson, JV; Bolton, T (eds.). Celtic-Norse Relationships in the Irish Sea in the Middle Ages, 800–1200. The Northern World: North Europe and the Baltic c. 400–1700 AD. Peoples, Economics and Cultures. Leiden: Brill. pp. 39–63. ISBN 978-90-04-25512-8. ISSN 1569-1462.
- Flanagan, MT (1997) [1996]. "Irish and Anglo-Norman Warfare in Twelfth-Century Ireland". In Bartlett, T; Jeffrey, K (eds.). A Military History of Ireland. Cambridge: Cambridge University Press. pp. 52–75. ISBN 0-521-41599-3.
- Flanagan, MT (1998). "Strategies of Lordship in Pre-Norman and Post-Norman Leinster". In Harper-Bill, C (ed.). Anglo-Norman Studies. Vol. 20. Woodbridge: The Boydell Press. pp. 107–126. ISBN 0-85115-573-1. ISSN 0954-9927.
- Flanagan, MT (2004a). "Clare, Richard fitz Gilbert de, Second Earl of Pembroke (c.1130–1176)". Oxford Dictionary of National Biography (online ed.). Oxford University Press. doi:10.1093/ref:odnb/5447. (Subscription, Wikipedia Library access or UK public library membership required.)
- Flanagan, MT (2004b). "Fitzgerald, Raymond fitz William (d. 1189x92)". Oxford Dictionary of National Biography (online ed.). Oxford University Press. doi:10.1093/ref:odnb/9582. (Subscription, Wikipedia Library access or UK public library membership required.)
- Flanagan, MT (2004c). "Mac Murchada, Diarmait (c.1110–1171)". Oxford Dictionary of National Biography (online ed.). Oxford University Press. doi:10.1093/ref:odnb/17697. (Subscription, Wikipedia Library access or UK public library membership required.)
- Flanagan, MT (2004d). "Ua Conchobair, Ruaidrí [Rory O'Connor] (c.1116–1198)". Oxford Dictionary of National Biography (online ed.). Oxford University Press. doi:10.1093/ref:odnb/20522. (Subscription, Wikipedia Library access or UK public library membership required.)
- Flanagan, MT (2005a). "Anglo-Norman Invasion". In Duffy, S (ed.). Medieval Ireland: An Encyclopedia. New York: Routledge. pp. 17–19. ISBN 0-415-94052-4.
- Flanagan, MT (2005b). "Henry II". In Duffy, S (ed.). Medieval Ireland: An Encyclopedia. New York: Routledge. pp. 210–212. ISBN 0-415-94052-4.
- Forte, A; Oram, RD; Pedersen, F (2005). Viking Empires. Cambridge: Cambridge University Press. ISBN 978-0-521-82992-2.
- Frame, R (2016) [2013]. "Ireland After 1169: Barriers to Acculturation on an 'English' Edge". In Stringer, KJ; Jotischky, A (eds.). Norman Expansion: Connections, Continuities and Contrasts. Milton Park, Abingdon: Routledge. pp. 115–141. doi:10.4324/9781315598550. ISBN 978-1-409-44838-9.
- French, NE (2015a). "Dublin, 1160–1200: Part One". Dublin Historical Record. 68 (1): 21–35. ISSN 0012-6861. JSTOR 24616064.
- French, NE (2015b). "Dublin, 1160–1200: Part 2". Dublin Historical Record. 68 (2): 227–242. ISSN 0012-6861. JSTOR 24616096.
- Gillingham, J (2000). The English in the Twelfth Century: Imperialism, National Identity, and Political Values. The Boydell Press. ISBN 0-85115-732-7.
- Gillingham, J (2004) [1999]. "Killing and Mutilating Political Enemies in the British Isles From the Late Twelfth to the Early Fourteenth Century: A Comparative Study". In Smith, B (ed.). Britain and Ireland 900–1300: Insular Responses to Medieval European Change. Cambridge: Cambridge University Press. pp. 114–134. ISBN 0-511-03855-0.
- Grant, A (2016) [2013]. "At the Northern Edge: Alba and its Normans". In Stringer, KJ; Jotischky, A (eds.). Norman Expansion: Connections, Continuities and Contrasts. Milton Park, Abingdon: Routledge. pp. 49–85. doi:10.4324/9781315598550. ISBN 978-1-409-44838-9.
- Halpin, A (2005). "Weapons and Weaponry". In Duffy, S (ed.). Medieval Ireland: An Encyclopedia. New York: Routledge. pp. 511–514. ISBN 0-415-94052-4.
- Harrison, SH (2016). "'Warrior Graves'? The Weapon Burial Rite in Viking Age Britain and Ireland". In Barrett, JH; Gibbon, SJ (eds.). Maritime Societies of the Viking and Medieval World. The Society for Medieval Archaeology Monograph. Milton Park, Abingdon: Routledge. pp. 299–319. doi:10.4324/9781315630755. ISBN 978-1-315-63075-5. ISSN 0583-9106.
- Heath, I (1989). Armies of Feudal Europe, 1066–1300 (2nd ed.). Wargames Research Group.
- Holm, P (2000). "Viking Dublin and the City-State Concept: Parameters and Significance of the Hiberno-Norse Settlement". In Hansen, MH (ed.). A Comparative Study of Thiry City-State Cultures. Historisk-filosofiske Skrifter. Det Kongelige Danske Videnskabernes Selskab. pp. 251–262. ISBN 87-7876-177-8. ISSN 0023-3307.
- Holm, P (2015). "The Naval Power of Norse Dublin". In Purcell, E; MacCotter, P; Nyhan, J; Sheehan, J (eds.). Clerics, Kings and Vikings: Essays on Medieval Ireland in Honour of Donnchadh Ó Corráin. Dublin: Four Courts Press.
- Jones, RW (2010). Bloodied Banners: Martial Display on the Medieval Battlefield. Woodbridge: The Boydell Press. ISBN 978-1-84383-561-5.
- Latimer, P (1989). "Henry II's Campaign against the Welsh in 1165". The Welsh History Review. 14 (4): 523–552. eISSN 0083-792X. hdl:10107/1080171. ISSN 0043-2431.
- Marstrander, CJS (1915). Bidrag Til Det Norske Sprogs Historie I Irland. Oslo: Jacob Dybwad. OL 23281298M.
- Martin, FX (1994) [1967]. "The Normans: Arrival and Settlement (1169–c. 1300)". In Moody, TW; Martin, FX (eds.). The Course of Irish History (1994 revised and enhanced ed.). Cork: Mercier Press. pp. 123–143. ISBN 1-85635-108-4.
- Martin, FX (2008a) [1987]. "Allies and an Overlord, 1169–72". In Cosgrove, A (ed.). Medieval Ireland, 1169–1534. New History of Ireland. Oxford: Oxford University Press. pp. 67–97. ISBN 978-0-19-821755-8.
- Martin, FX (2008b) [1987]. "Diarmait Mac Murchada and the Coming of the Anglo-Normans". In Cosgrove, A (ed.). Medieval Ireland, 1169–1534. New History of Ireland. Oxford: Oxford University Press. pp. 43–66. ISBN 978-0-19-821755-8.
- McDonald, RA (1997). The Kingdom of the Isles: Scotland's Western Seaboard, c. 1100–c. 1336. Scottish Historical Monographs. East Linton: Tuckwell Press. ISBN 978-1-898410-85-0.
- McDonald, RA (2002). "Soldiers Most Unfortunate". In McDonald, R (ed.). History, Literature, and Music in Scotland, 700–1560. Toronto: University of Toronto Press. pp. 93–119. ISBN 0-8020-3601-5.
- McDonald, RA (2007a). "Dealing Death From Man: Manx Sea Power in and around the Irish Sea, 1079–1265". In Duffy, S (ed.). The World of the Galloglass: Kings, Warlords and Warriors in Ireland and Scotland, 1200–1600. Dublin: Four Courts Press. pp. 45–76. ISBN 978-1-85182-946-0.
- McDonald, RA (2007b). Manx Kingship in its Irish Sea Setting, 1187–1229: King Rǫgnvaldr and the Crovan Dynasty. Dublin: Four Courts Press. ISBN 978-1-84682-047-2.
- McDonald, RA (2012). "The Manx Sea Kings and the Western Oceans: The Late Norse Isle of Man in its North Atlantic Context, 1079–1265". In Hudson, B (ed.). Studies in the Medieval Atlantic. The New Middle Ages. New York: Palgrave Macmillan. pp. 143–184. doi:10.1057/9781137062390_6. ISBN 978-1-137-06239-0.
- McMahon, M; Collins, B; Buckley, L; Butler, V (2002). "Early Medieval Settlement and Burial Outside the Enclosed Town: Evidence From Archaeological Excavations at Bride Street, Dublin". Proceedings of the Royal Irish Academy. 102C (4): 67–135. doi:10.3318/PRIC.2002.102.1.67. eISSN 2009-0048. ISSN 0035-8991. JSTOR 25506170. S2CID 192196631.
- Moody, TW; Martin, FX; Byrne, FJ, eds. (2005). Maps, Genealogies, Lists: A Companion to Irish History. New History of Ireland. Oxford: Clarendon Press. ISBN 9780198217459.
- Murphy, M (2009). "Review of RA McDonald, Manx Kingship in its Irish Sea Setting, 1187–1229: King Rognvaldr and the Crovan Dynasty". Eolas: The Journal of the American Society of Irish Medieval Studies. 3: 112–114. ISSN 1931-2539. JSTOR 25681888.
- Naismith, R (2017). Naismith, Rory (ed.). Medieval European Coinage. Vol. 8. Cambridge: Cambridge University Press. doi:10.1017/CBO9781139031370. ISBN 9780521260169.
- Ní Mhaonaigh, M (2018). "Perception and Reality: Ireland c.980–1229". In Smith, B (ed.). The Cambridge History of Ireland. Vol. 1. Cambridge: Cambridge University Press. pp. 131–156. doi:10.1017/9781316275399.009. ISBN 978-1-107-11067-0.
- O'Byrne, E (2003). "A Much Disputed Land: Carrickmines and the Dublin Marches". In Duffy, S (ed.). Medieval Dublin. Vol. 4. Dublin: Four Courts Press. pp. 229–252. ISBN 1-85182-743-9.
- O'Byrne, E (2004). "Cultures in Contact in the Leinster and Dublin Marches, 1170–1400". In Duffy, S (ed.). Medieval Dublin. Vol. 5. Dublin: Four Courts Press. pp. 111–148. ISBN 1-85182-801-X.
- O'Byrne, E (2005). "Ua Conchobair, Ruaidrí (c. 1116–1198)". In Duffy, S (ed.). Medieval Ireland: An Encyclopedia. New York: Routledge. pp. 466–471. ISBN 0-415-94052-4.
- Oram, RD (2011). Domination and Lordship: Scotland 1070–1230. The New Edinburgh History of Scotland. Edinburgh: Edinburgh University Press. ISBN 978-0-7486-1496-7. Archived from the original on 18 June 2019 – via Questia.
- Ó Corráin, D (n.d.). "The Vikings & Ireland" (PDF). Corpus of Electronic Texts. University College Cork.
- Ó Corráin, D (1996) [1989]. "Prehistoric and Early Christian Ireland". In Foster, RF (ed.). The Oxford Illustrated History of Ireland. Oxford: Oxford University Press. pp. 1–52. ISBN 0-19-285245-0.
- Ó Cróinín, D, ed. (2008) [2005]. "Index". Prehistoric and Early Ireland. New History of Ireland. Oxford: Oxford University Press. pp. 1148–1219. ISBN 978-0-19-821737-4.
- Ó Murchadha, D (1992–1993). "Nationality Names in the Irish Annals" (PDF). Nomina. 16: 49–70. ISSN 0141-6340.
- Purcell, E (2003–2004). "The Expulsion of the Ostmen, 1169–71: The Documentary Evidence". Peritia. 17–18: 276–294. doi:10.1484/J.Peri.3.537. eISSN 2034-6506. ISSN 0332-1592.
- Simms, K (1996) [1989]. "The Norman Invasion and the Gaelic Recovery". In Foster, RF (ed.). The Oxford Illustrated History of Ireland. Oxford: Oxford University Press. pp. 53–103. ISBN 0-19-285245-0.
- Smith, B (2018). "Introduction". In Smith, B (ed.). The Cambridge History of Ireland. Vol. 1. Cambridge: Cambridge University Press. pp. 1–11. doi:10.1017/9781316275399.004. ISBN 978-1-107-11067-0.
- Sposato, PW (2009). "The Perception of Anglo-Norman Modernity and the Conquest of Ireland". Comitatus: A Journal of Medieval and Renaissance Studies. 40: 25–44. doi:10.1353/cjm.2009.0053. S2CID 154347001.
- Stokes, W (1905). "The Irish Abridgement of the 'Expugnatio Hibernica'". English Historical Review. 20 (77): 77–115. doi:10.1093/ehr/xx.lxxvii.77. eISSN 1477-4534. ISSN 0013-8266.
- Thomson, PL (2008) [1987]. The New History of Orkney (3rd ed.). Edinburgh: Birlinn. ISBN 978-1-84158-696-0.
- Veach, C (2014). Lordship in Four Realms: The Lacy Family, 1166–1241. Manchester Medieval Studies. Manchester: Manchester University Press. ISBN 978-0-7190-8937-4.
- Vincent, N (2018). "Angevin Ireland". In Smith, B (ed.). The Cambridge History of Ireland. Vol. 1. Cambridge: Cambridge University Press. pp. 185–221. doi:10.1017/9781316275399.011. ISBN 978-1-107-11067-0.
- Weiss, J (1999). "Thomas and the Earl: Literary and Historical Contexts for Romance of Horn". In Field, R (ed.). Tradition and Transformation in Medieval Romance. Woodbridge: The Boydell Press. pp. 1–14. ISBN 0-85991-553-0.
- Woods, A (2013). Economy and Authority: A Study of the Coinage of Hiberno-Scandinavian Dublin and Ireland (PhD thesis). Vol. 1. University of Cambridge. doi:10.17863/CAM.7489. hdl:1810/262248.
- Wyatt, D (2009). Slaves and Warriors in Medieval Britain and Ireland, 800–1200. The Northern World: North Europe and the Baltic c. 400–1700 AD. Peoples, Economics and Cultures. Leiden: Brill. ISBN 978-90-04-17533-4. ISSN 1569-1462.
- Wyatt, D (2018). "Slavery and Cultural Antipathy". In Pargas, DA; Roşu, F (eds.). Critical Readings on Global Slavery. Vol. 2. Leiden: Brill. pp. 742–799. doi:10.1163/9789004346611_025. ISBN 978-90-04-34661-1.

Ascall mac Ragnaill Meic Torcaill Died: 1171
Regnal titles
Unknown Last known title holder: Brodar mac Torcaill	King of Dublin ×1170	Extinct
