= Conchobar Ua Briain =

- King of Munster and Dublin
- Reign: 1141–1142
- Predecessor: Conchobar Ua Conchobair
- Successor: Óttar of Dublin
- Died: 1142; Ireland
- House: Uí Briain
- Father: Diarmait Ua Briain

Conchobar Ua Briain (died 1142) was a mid-twelfth-century ruler of the kingdoms of Munster and Dublin.

Conchobar was a son of Diarmait Ua Briain, King of Munster. In 1138, Conchobar assumed the kingship of Munster. The Annals of the Four Masters reveals that he gained the kingship of Dublin in 1141. He died the following year.

It is believed that Conchobar Ua Briain founded what is now known as Cahir Castle in the early 12th century. The fortress was a state-of-the-art defensive stronghold at the time, and continued to be in use for hundreds of years after being gifted to the Butler family in 1375 by Edward III.
