= Annals of Boyle =

- Subject: Medieval Ireland
- Publication place: Ireland

The Annals of Boyle (Irish: Annála Mhainistir na Búille, IPA: [ˈan̪ˠaːlə ˈwanʲəʃtʲəɾʲ ˈnˠə ˈbˠuːl̪ʲə]), also Cottonian Annals, are a chronicle of medieval Ireland. The entries span the years up to 1253. It is considered one of the works that forms The Chronicle of Ireland, although in summary form compared to others.

== Description ==
Robin Flower wrote in 1927:

The MS is the original chronicle of the Premonstratensian house of the Holy Trinity on the Island named after it in Loch Cé, founded on an earlier chronicle, perhaps that of Boyle. It remained in Holy Trinity till the secularization of that house, being used by the writers of the Annals of Loch Cé, who worked for the MacDermots. It passed into the hands of the Croftons with the other property of the house, and while in their hands was seen by Ussher, who probably called it the Annals of Boyle, which it has been known as ever since. From the Croftons, it passed to Oliver St John, Viscount Grandison of Limerick, who gave it to Sir Robert Cotton before 1630 and, with his library, it came into the British Museum in 1753 with a number of other Irish manuscripts and manuscripts of Irish interest.

The Annals used the Irish language, with some entries in Latin. Because the Annals copied its sources verbatim, the annals are useful not just for historians, but also for linguists studying the evolution of the Irish language.

The manuscript is now held in the British Library, under reference Cotton MS Titus A XXV.

== See also ==
- Irish annals
- The Chronicle of Ireland
