= 1173 =

1173 in various calendars
- Gregorian calendar: 1173; MCLXXIII
- Ab urbe condita: 1926
- Armenian calendar: 622; ԹՎ ՈԻԲ
- Assyrian calendar: 5923
- Balinese saka calendar: 1094–1095
- Bengali calendar: 579–580
- Berber calendar: 2123
- English Regnal year: 19 Hen. 2 – 20 Hen. 2
- Buddhist calendar: 1717
- Burmese calendar: 535
- Byzantine calendar: 6681–6682
- Chinese calendar: 壬辰年 (Water Dragon); 3870 or 3663 — to — 癸巳年 (Water Snake); 3871 or 3664
- Coptic calendar: 889–890
- Discordian calendar: 2339
- Ethiopian calendar: 1165–1166
- Hebrew calendar: 4933–4934
- Hindu calendars
- Vikram Samvat: 1229–1230
- Shaka Samvat: 1094–1095
- Kali Yuga: 4273–4274
- Holocene calendar: 11173
- Igbo calendar: 173–174
- Iranian calendar: 551–552
- Islamic calendar: 568–569
- Japanese calendar: Jōan 3 (承安３年)
- Javanese calendar: 1080–1081
- Julian calendar: 1173; MCLXXIII
- Korean calendar: 3506
- Minguo calendar: 739 before ROC 民前739年
- Nanakshahi calendar: −295
- Seleucid era: 1484/1485 AG
- Thai solar calendar: 1715–1716
- Tibetan calendar: ཆུ་ཕོ་འབྲུག་ལོ་ (male Water-Dragon); 1299 or 918 or 146 — to — ཆུ་མོ་སྦྲུལ་ལོ་ (female Water-Snake); 1300 or 919 or 147

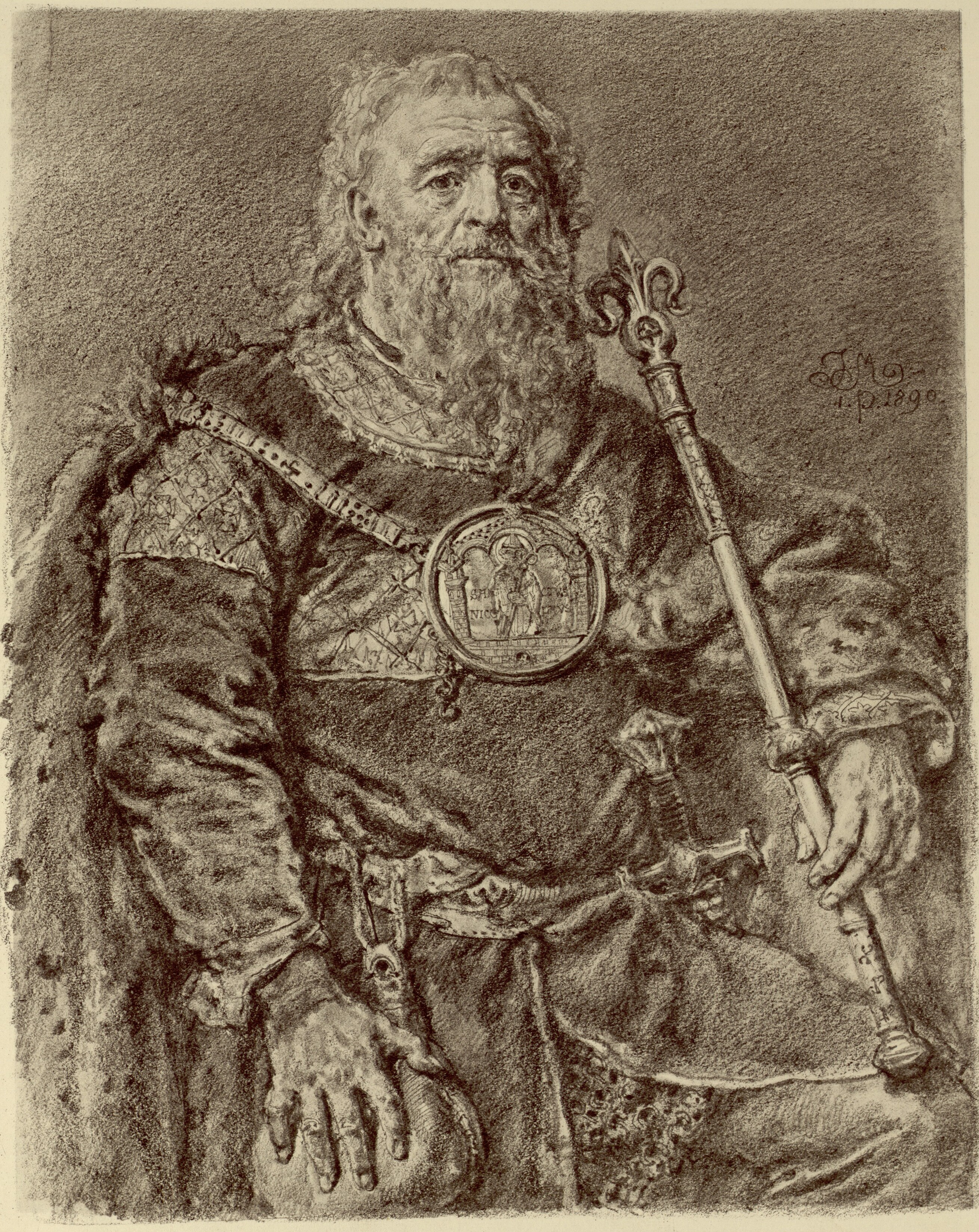
Mieszko III, Duke of Greater Poland 1173–1202

Year 1173 (MCLXXIII) was a common year starting on Monday of the Julian calendar.

== Events ==
=== By place ===
==== Europe ====
- January 5 – Bolesław IV the Curly, High Duke of Poland, dies after a 27-year reign. He is succeeded by his half-brother Mieszko III the Old, and as duke of Sandomierz in Lesser Poland by Casimir II the Just.
- Knut Eriksson (King Canute I of Sweden) extends his rule after the death of co-ruler Kol – which includes also Östergötland. He becomes the unopposed sole-ruler of Sweden with the support of jarl Birger Brosa.
- Abu Yaqub Yusuf, caliph of the Almohad Caliphate, re-populates the western Andalusian city of Beja. But it is rapidly abandoned, a sign of the quick demographic weakening of the Muslims in the peninsula.

==== England ====
- March – Henry the Young King withdraws to the French court, marking the beginning of the Revolt of 1173–1174, a dispute between King Henry II, his estranged wife Eleanor of Aquitaine and three of their sons over the territories they control. Eleanor is placed under de facto house arrest. William the Lion, King of Scotland, invades the North of England in support of the rebellion.
- October 17 – Revolt of 1173–74: Battle of Fornham – Flemish mercenaries under rebel leader Robert de Beaumont, Earl of Leicester, are defeated at a ford in East Anglia by the English royalists under Lord Richard de Lucy.

==== Egypt ====
- Summer – Saladin leads an expeditionary army against the Bedouin tribes in Oultrejordain to secure a route between Egypt and Syria. He raids the region at Kerak Castle.
- Pro-Fatimid rising in Upper Egypt led by Kanz al-Dawla, governor of Aswan, is crushed by Saladin's brother Al-Adil.

==== China ====
- The Qiandao era ends and the Chunxi era begins during the reign of Emperor Xiao Zong of the Song dynasty.

==== South India ====
- Sinhalese king Parakramabahu I "the Great" gains a decisive victory by invading the Chola Empire as an ally of the Pandyas, capturing Tondi and Pasi regions.

=== By topic ===
==== Art and leisure ====
- August 8 – The construction of a campanile, which will become the Leaning Tower of Pisa, begins.
- Algebraic chess notation is first recorded.

==== Agriculture ====
- Approximate date – King Béla III of Hungary invites Cistercian and Premonstratensian monks to Hungary. They introduce advanced agricultural methods in the realm.

==== Religion ====
- February 21 – Thomas Becket is canonized by Pope Alexander III. His tomb in Canterbury Cathedral becomes a shrine and a popular pilgrimage destination.
- Pedro Gudestéiz resigns the archdiocese of Santiago de Compostela after some controversy.
- Approximate date – Peter Waldo, French spiritual leader, is converted to Christianity and founds the Waldensians.
- Traditional date – The Great Mosque of al-Nuri, Mosul, is completed to the orders of Nur al-Din Zengi.

== Births ==
- May 21 – Shinran, founder of Jōdo Shinshū (Shin Buddhism) (d. 1263)
- October 31 – Kujō Ninshi, Japanese empress (d. 1239)
- December 23 – Louis I, duke of Bavaria (d. 1231)
- Diya' al-Din al-Maqdisi, Arab Sunni scholar (d. 1245)
- Frederick I, count of Berg-Altena (d. 1198)
- Kolbeinn Tumason, Icelandic chieftain (d. 1208)
- Louis IV, Count of Chiny ("the Young"), French nobleman (d. 1226)
- Rostislav II, Grand Prince of Kiev (d. 1214)
- Tankei, Japanese Buddhist sculptor (d. 1256)
- Walter Devereux, Anglo-Norman nobleman (d. 1197)
- Approximate date – Llywelyn ab Iorwerth ("the Great"), Welsh king of Gwynedd (d. 1240)

== Deaths ==
- January 5 – Bolesław IV the Curly, duke of Poland
- February 10 – Muiredach Ua Cobthaig, Irish bishop
- March 10 – Richard of Saint Victor, Scottish theologian
- May 25 – Euphrosyne of Polotsk, Belarusian granddaughter
- August 9 – Najm ad-Din Ayyub, father of Saladin
- August 13 – Nerses IV, Catholicos of Armenia (b. 1102)
- September 23 – Fujiwara no Ikushi, Japanese empress consort (b. 1146)
- October 15 – Petronilla, queen regnant of Aragon (b. 1136)
- November 7 – Uijong, Korean ruler Goryeo (b. 1127)
- Benoît de Sainte-Maure, French poet and writer
- Kol of Sweden, Swedish ruler of Östergötland
- Narasimha I, Indian ruler of the Hoysala Empire
- Raimbaut d'Aurenga, French troubadour (b. 1147)
- Rajaraja II, Indian ruler of the Chola dynasty
- Reginald Fitzurse, English nobleman (b. 1145)
- Roger de Clare, 2nd Earl of Hertford, English nobleman (b. 1116)
- Approximate date
  - Benjamin of Tudela, Spanish Jewish traveler (b. 1130)
  - Hemachandra, Indian poet and polymath (b. 1088)
