= 1149 =

1149 in various calendars
- Gregorian calendar: 1149; MCXLIX
- Ab urbe condita: 1902
- Armenian calendar: 598; ԹՎ ՇՂԸ
- Assyrian calendar: 5899
- Balinese saka calendar: 1070–1071
- Bengali calendar: 555–556
- Berber calendar: 2099
- English Regnal year: 14 Ste. 1 – 15 Ste. 1
- Buddhist calendar: 1693
- Burmese calendar: 511
- Byzantine calendar: 6657–6658
- Chinese calendar: 戊辰年 (Earth Dragon); 3846 or 3639 — to — 己巳年 (Earth Snake); 3847 or 3640
- Coptic calendar: 865–866
- Discordian calendar: 2315
- Ethiopian calendar: 1141–1142
- Hebrew calendar: 4909–4910
- Hindu calendars
- Vikram Samvat: 1205–1206
- Shaka Samvat: 1070–1071
- Kali Yuga: 4249–4250
- Holocene calendar: 11149
- Igbo calendar: 149–150
- Iranian calendar: 527–528
- Islamic calendar: 543–544
- Japanese calendar: Kyūan 5 (久安５年)
- Javanese calendar: 1055–1056
- Julian calendar: 1149; MCXLIX
- Korean calendar: 3482
- Minguo calendar: 763 before ROC 民前763年
- Nanakshahi calendar: −319
- Seleucid era: 1460/1461 AG
- Thai solar calendar: 1691–1692
- Tibetan calendar: ས་ཕོ་འབྲུག་ལོ་ (male Earth-Dragon); 1275 or 894 or 122 — to — ས་མོ་སྦྲུལ་ལོ་ (female Earth-Snake); 1276 or 895 or 123

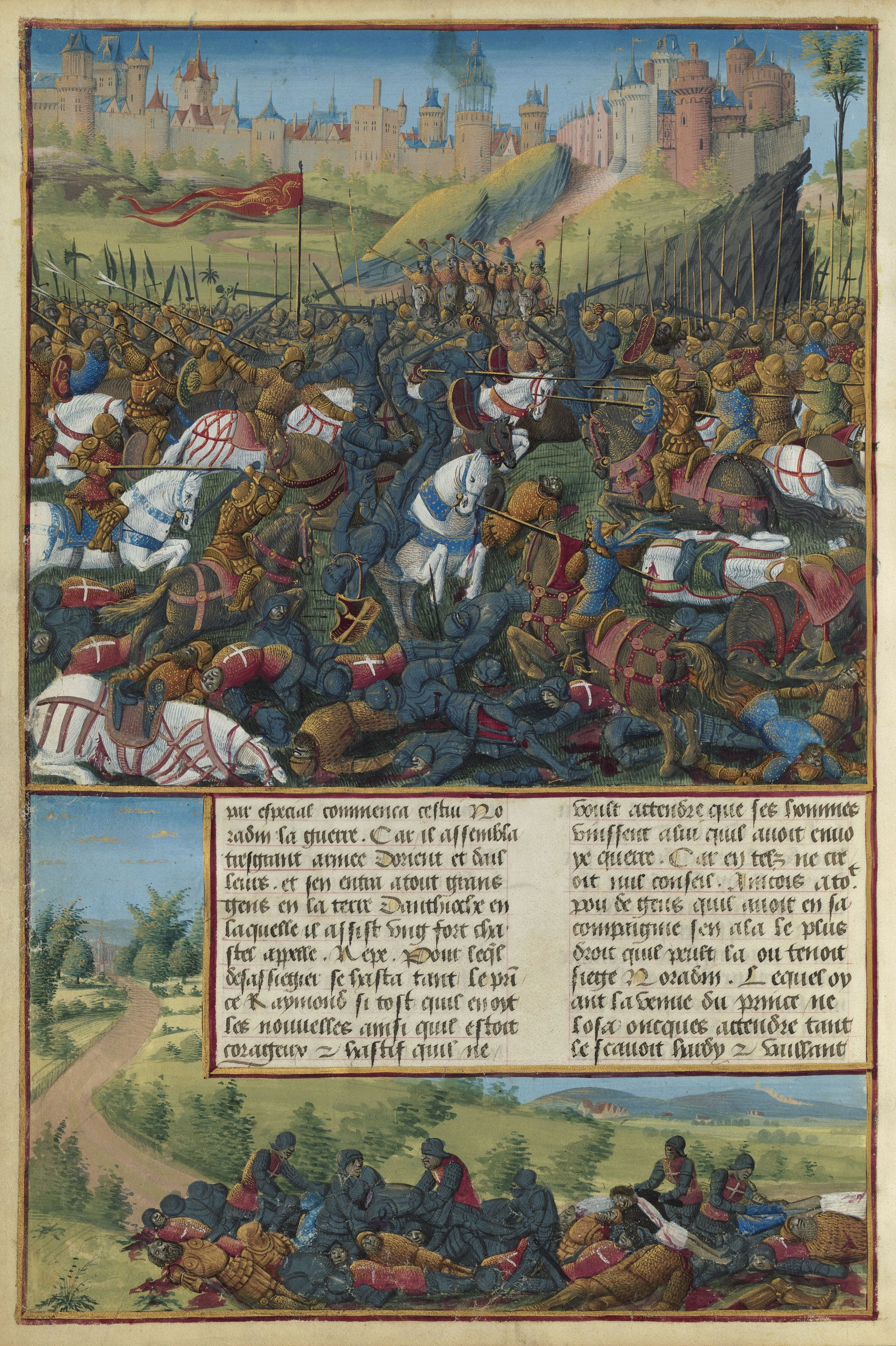
The Battle of Inab (or Ard al-Hatim)

Year 1149 (MCXLIX) was a common year starting on Saturday of the Julian calendar.

== Events ==
=== By place ===
==== Byzantine Empire ====
- Spring – Emperor Manuel I Komnenos recovers Corfu with the help of the Venetians, who defeat the Sicilian fleet. During the three-month siege, Byzantine admiral Stephen Kontostephanos is killed by a stone thrown by a catapult. Manuel prepares an offensive against the Normans; King Roger II sends a fleet (some 40 ships) under George of Antioch, to pillage the suburbs of Constantinople.

==== Levant ====
- Spring – Nur al-Din, Seljuk ruler (atabeg) of Aleppo, invades the Principality of Antioch and defeats the Crusaders under Raymond of Poitiers at Baghras. He moves southward to besiege the fortress of Inab, one of the few strongholds of the Crusaders east of the Orontes River. Raymond with a small army (supported by the Assassin allies under Ali ibn Wafa) hurries to its rescue. Nur al-Din, misinformed of the strength of the Crusader forces, retreats. In fact the Zangid forces (some 6,000 men) outnumber the Crusaders by over four to one. Against Ali's advice Raymond decides to reinforce the garrison of Inab.
- April – King Louis VII and Queen Eleanor of Aquitaine sail homeward in separate Sicilian ships. While the fleet rounds the Peloponnese (southern Greece) it is attacked by ships of the Byzantine navy. Louis gives orders to raise the French flag and is allowed to sail on. But the ships containing many of his followers and his possessions are captured and taken as a war-prize to Constantinople.
- June 29 – Battle of Inab: The Zangid army under Nur al-Din defeats the combined army of Raymond of Poitiers and the Assassins of Ali ibn Wafa at Inab. After the battle, Nur al-Din invades Antiochene territory and captures the fortresses of Artah and Harim. He then turns west to appear before the walls of Antioch itself and raids as far as St. Symeon.
- July – King Baldwin III receives an urgent request for help from Antioch to break the incomplete Zangid blockade of the city. Meanwhile, the Crusaders fail to retake Harim. Nur al-Din strengthens his siege of Antioch, but it is too large to surround. A truce is agreed under which Harim and farther east territory remains under Seljuk dominance.
- July 15 – The Church of the Holy Sepulchre in Jerusalem is consecrated, after reconstruction.

==== Europe ====
- The Italian 'naval republics' of Genoa, Pisa and Venice finance their expanding trade within and outside Europe – trade which includes an arms industry for manufactures and merchants alike (approximate date).
- October 24 – Ramon Berenguer IV, count of Barcelona, conquers Lleida from the Almoravids, after a siege of seven months (as well as Fraga and Mequinenza).
- Åhus, in present-day Sweden, gains city rights (approximate date).

==== Britain ====
- Spring – King Stephen besieges Worcester, but is unable to capture the castle due to its strong defences. He expels William de Beauchamp, lord of the city. Stephen builds two forts near the castle to assist in the attack.
- March – The 16-year-old Henry of Anjou, eldest son of Queen Matilda, lands in England in a second attempt to take the English throne from Stephen. He travels up via Salisbury and Gloucester north to Carlisle (Scotland).
- May 22 – Henry of Anjou is knighted at Carlisle by King David I. Henry acknowledges the Scottish king's right to Northumberland.

=== By topic ===
==== Commerce ====
- Genoa grants the benefits of a part of the city's fiscal revenues to a consortium of creditors called compera, the first example of the consolidation of public debt in medieval Europe.

==== Religion ====
- April 8 – Pope Eugene III takes refuge in the castle of Tusculum where he meets Louis VII and Eleanor of Aquitaine. He attempts to reunite the couple by insisting to restore the love between them.

== Births ==
- Albert of Vercelli, patriarch of Jerusalem (d. 1214)
- Al-Fa'iz bi-Nasr Allah, Fatimid caliph (d. 1160)
- Ch'oe Ch'ung-hŏn, Korean ruler of Goryeo (d. 1219)
- Fujiwara no Kanezane, Japanese nobleman (d. 1207)
- Majd al-Din ibn Athir, Zangid historian (d. 1210)
- Margaritus of Brindisi, Sicilian admiral (d. 1197)
- Minamoto no Michichika, Japanese nobleman (d. 1202)
- Muhammad of Ghor, ruler of the Ghurid Empire (d. 1206)
- Odon of Poznań, duke of Greater Poland (d. 1194)
- Shikishi, Japanese princess, poet and nun (d. 1201)

== Deaths ==
- January 15 – Berengaria of Barcelona, queen of Castile (b. 1116)
- March 10 – Reginald I ("the One-Eyed"), count of Bar
- April 24 – Petronille de Chemillé, French abbess
- May 8 – Bernard du Bec, French Benedictine abbot
- June 29 – Raymond of Poitiers, prince of Antioch
- August 28 – Mu'in al-Din Unur, Seljuk ruler of Damascus
- September 30 – Arnaud de Lévezou, French archbishop
- October 8 – Al-Hafiz, caliph of the Fatimid Caliphate
- Joseph ibn Tzaddik, Spanish Jewish rabbi and poet
- Machig Labdrön, Tibetan Buddhist teacher (b. 1055)
- Pedro Helías, archbishop of Santiago de Compostela
- Qadi Ayyad, Almoravid imam and chief judge (b. 1083)
- Stephen Kontostephanos, Byzantine aristocrat (b. 1107)
