= Muirchertach Mac Lochlainn =

- High King of Ireland
- Reign: 1156-1166
- Predecessor: Toirdhealbhach Ua Conchobhair
- Successor: Ruaidrí Ua Conchobair

Muircheartach Mac Lochlainn (pronounced [ˈmˠɪɾʲəçəɾˠt̪ˠəx mˠək ˈl̪ˠɔxl̪ˠən̠ʲ]; Old Irish: Muirchertach mac Lochlainn) was king of Tír Eoghain, and High King of Ireland from around 1156 until his death in 1166. He succeeded Toirdhealbhach Ua Conchobhair who died in 1156.

Mac Lochlainn survived an attempt by Ruaidrí Ua Conchobair to unseat him in 1159. He failed, however, to overcome the resistance of the Cenél Conaill and the Ulaid. In 1166, to attempt to achieve a diplomatic settlement with his neighbours, Mac Lochlainn arranged a truce and took hostages from many of the families in Ulaid. In return he had given a solemn oath to the Bishop of Armagh and many other notables for his good behaviour. In violation of the oath, he had Eochaid mac Con Ulad Mac Duinn Sléibe, king of Ulaid, seized and blinded.

Mac Lochlainn's allies abandoned him almost at once, and he was reduced to a handful of followers. With sixteen of these closest associates, he was killed and his death attributed to the vengeance of Saint Patrick.

Preceded by Toirdhealbhach Ua Conchobhair	High King of Ireland; 1156–1166	Succeeded by Ruaidrí Ua Conchobair
