= 1187 in Ireland =

- Centuries: 11th; 12th; 13th; 14th
- Decades: 1160s; 1170s; 1180s; 1190s; 1200s
- See also: Other events of 1187; List of years in Ireland

Events from the year 1187 in Ireland.

== Incumbent ==
- Lord: John

== Events ==
- The Rock of Loch Cé (Lough Key) was struck by lightning at midday, resulting in many deaths. In particular, Duvesa (Duibhessa); wife of Conchobair Mac Diarmata, lord of Moylurg; was burned and drowned, along with seven hundred or more people in the same event.

== Deaths ==
- Ruaidhri Ua Flaithbertaigh, king of Cenél-Eógain, was killed on a foray in Tir-Conaill
- Murtough O’Maeluire, Bishop of Clonfert
