= 1226 =

1226 in various calendars
- Gregorian calendar: 1226; MCCXXVI
- Ab urbe condita: 1979
- Armenian calendar: 675; ԹՎ ՈՀԵ
- Assyrian calendar: 5976
- Balinese saka calendar: 1147–1148
- Bengali calendar: 632–633
- Berber calendar: 2176
- English Regnal year: 10 Hen. 3 – 11 Hen. 3
- Buddhist calendar: 1770
- Burmese calendar: 588
- Byzantine calendar: 6734–6735
- Chinese calendar: 乙酉年 (Wood Rooster); 3923 or 3716 — to — 丙戌年 (Fire Dog); 3924 or 3717
- Coptic calendar: 942–943
- Discordian calendar: 2392
- Ethiopian calendar: 1218–1219
- Hebrew calendar: 4986–4987
- Hindu calendars
- Vikram Samvat: 1282–1283
- Shaka Samvat: 1147–1148
- Kali Yuga: 4326–4327
- Holocene calendar: 11226
- Igbo calendar: 226–227
- Iranian calendar: 604–605
- Islamic calendar: 622–624
- Japanese calendar: Karoku 2 (嘉禄２年)
- Javanese calendar: 1134–1135
- Julian calendar: 1226; MCCXXVI
- Korean calendar: 3559
- Minguo calendar: 686 before ROC 民前686年
- Nanakshahi calendar: −242
- Thai solar calendar: 1768–1769
- Tibetan calendar: ཤིང་མོ་བྱ་ལོ་ (female Wood-Bird); 1352 or 971 or 199 — to — མེ་ཕོ་ཁྱི་ལོ་ (male Fire-Dog); 1353 or 972 or 200

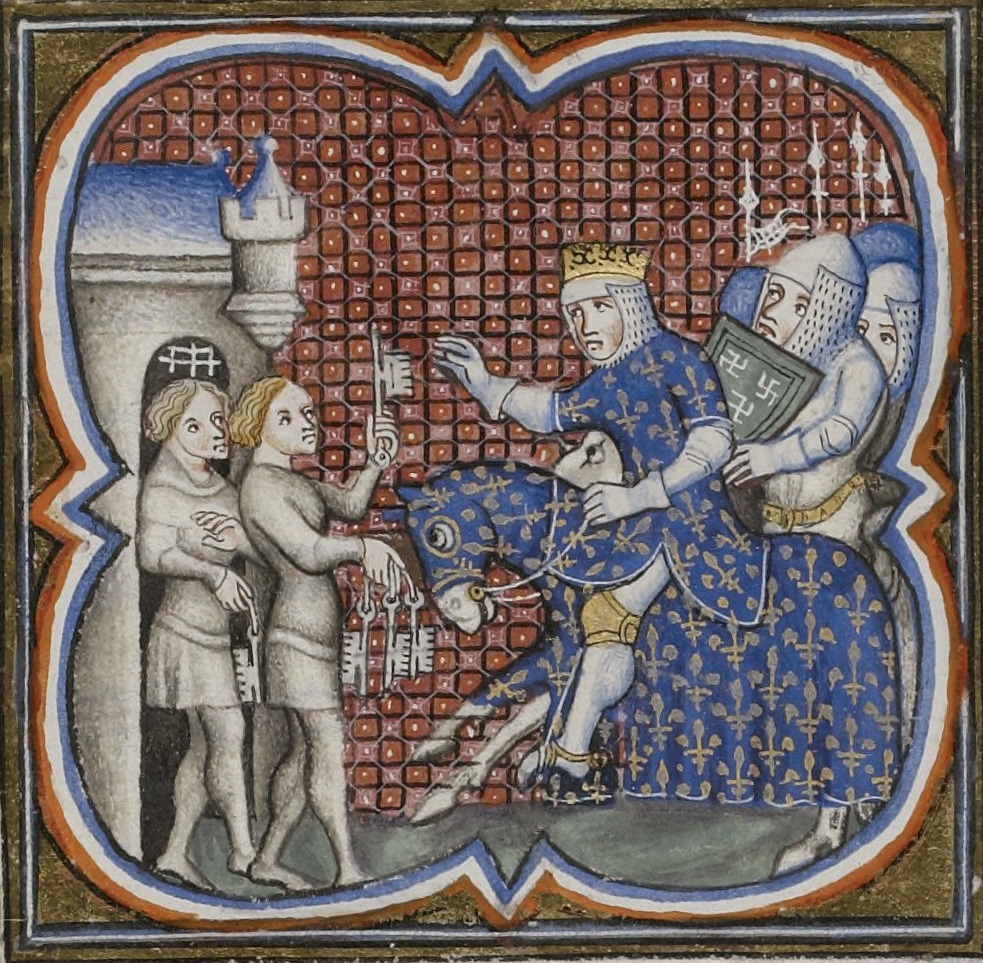
September 9: King Louis VIII of France accepts the surrender of the rebels at Avignon.

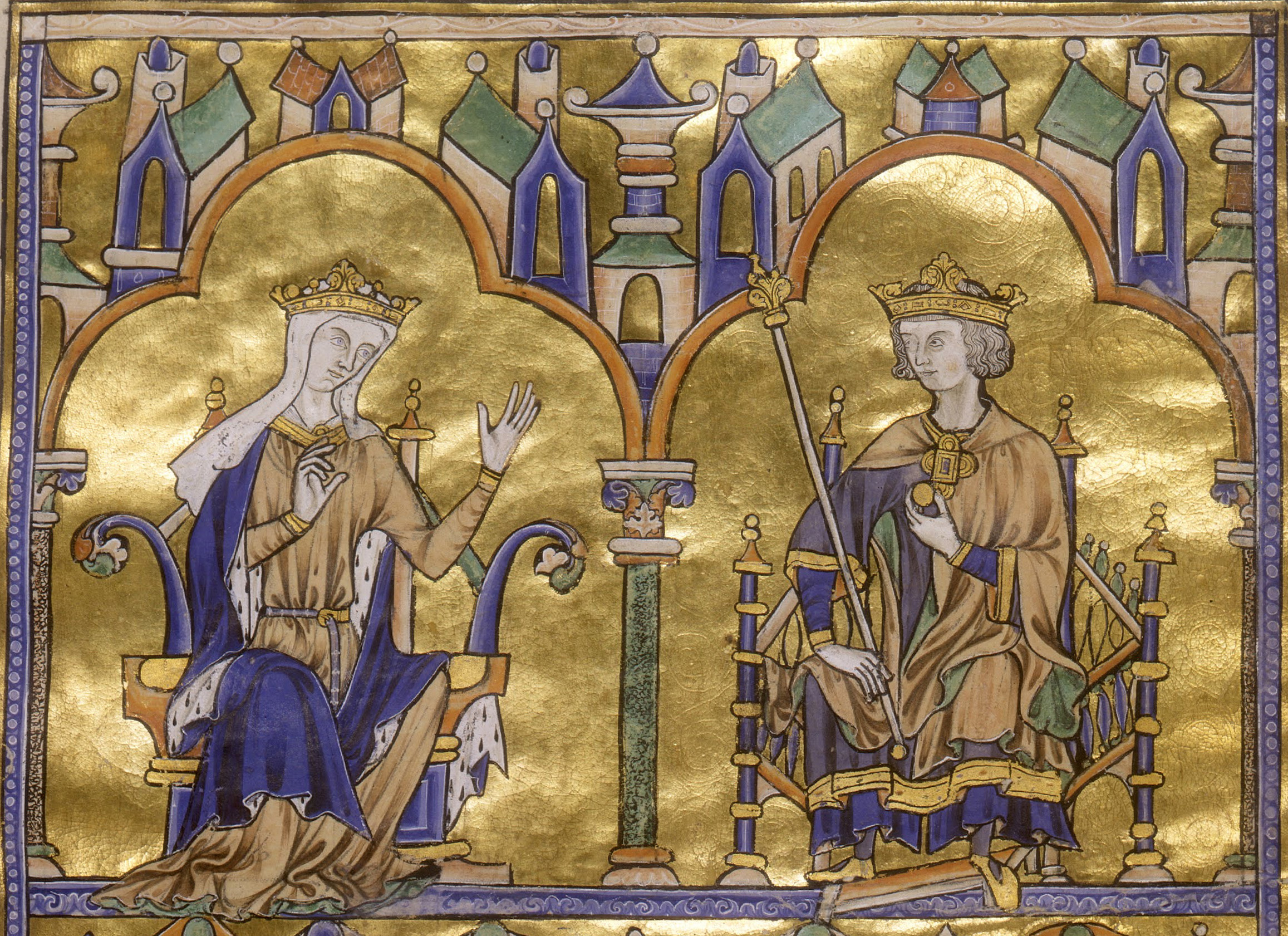
November 8: Louis IX (right) becomes the King of France at age 12, with his mother, Blanche of Castile (left), serving as regent (painted c. 1240 AD)

Year 1226 (MCCXXVI) was a common year starting on Thursday of the Julian calendar.

== Events ==
=== January – March ===
- January 11 – At Đông Kinh (now Hanoi), Trần Thái Tông begins a 32-year reign as the Vietnamese Emperor of Dai Viet, beginning the Trần dynasty.
- January 30 –
  - Pope Honorius III approves the "Rule of Saint Albert (written by Saint Albert Avoggadro of Vercelli as the guide for the Carmelites (the Order of the Brothers of the Blessed Virgin Mary of Mount Carmel) with the papal bull Ut vivendi normam.
  - King Louis VIII of France takes the cross to resume the Albigensian Crusade against the Catharism movement in Languedoc in southern France.
- February 20 – Pope Honorius III directs the Franciscan Archbishop of Toledo, Rodrigo Jiménez de Rada, to lead the Franciscans in converting Moroccan Muslims to Christianity.
- February 25 – (Karoku 2, 27th day of 1st month) In Japan, 8-year-old Kujō Yoritsune is raised to the status of the Shōgun Fujiwara no Yoritsune of the Kamakura shogunate by the Emperor Go-Horikawa, but the power over the Imperial military remains with the regent Hōjō Yoshitoki.
- March 4 – Just before dawn, a great conjunction between Saturn and Jupiter is observed from Earth. The conjunction is more significant than other occurrences because the separation of the two planets as visible in the sky of Earth (2.1 arcminutes or 1/30th of one degree of arc) will not be closer again until March 8, 4523 CE, and the close conjunction is the most easily visible from Earth until the conjunction of December 21, 2020.
- March 9 – Khwarazmian Empire forces commanded by the Muslim Sultan Jalal al-Din Mangburni capture Tbilisi, capital of the Kingdom of Georgia. After the capture, the massacre of thousands of its Christian inhabitants begins as residents are given the choice between converting to Islam or being put to death.
- March 26 – Frederick II, Holy Roman Emperor issues the Golden Bull of Rimini, in which he grants Teutonic Knights the right to all of the lands they will get during the mission in Prussia; he also declares himself a senior of the Teutonic Order and Poland, as well as the universal ruler of Christian Europe.

=== April – June ===
- April 5 – The Treaty of Melun is concluded between France (ruled by King Louis VIII) and Flanders, ruled jointly of by Jeanne, Countess of Flanders and Hainaut, with France agreeing to release her husband Count Ferrand (who had been a prisoner of war since 1214 in return for payment by Flanders of 50,000 livres in two installments, with Lille, Douai, and Sluis to be occupied by French troops until the debt is paid. In addition, Ferrand and Jeanne agree to swear their loyalty to King Louis, and to require that all Flemish nobles, knight and burghers take a similar oath of loyalty, including a promise not to support the Count of Flanders if he backs out of the treaty.
- May 14 – At the age of 11, Queen Isabella (Zabel), daughter of the dead King Leo, is formally crowned as the Queen of the Armenian Kingdom of Cilicia, in a ceremony at the Armenian capital, Sis.
- May 17 – Ralph Neville is appointed as the new Lord Chancellor of England by the Great Council of Regency, regent for the Kingdom of England during the reign of King Henry III.
- June 7 – King Louis VIII of France begins the Crusade against the Cathars (Albigensians) in southern France and against Raymond VII, count of Count of Toulouse. Over the next three months, the Crusaders capture the cities of Béziers, Carcassonne, Beaucaire and Marseille and by Avignon's surrender on September 9, Louis forces the region of Languedoc into submission, and reasserts his authority upon the autonomous municipalities of his estates. Most cities have to accept the authority of Ramon Berenguer IV, count of Provence, but Marseille and Nice rebel.

=== July – September ===
- July 10 – In Baghdad, Al-Mānsūr al-Mustansir bi-llah (known as Al-Mustansir I) becomes the new Caliph of the adherents of Islam (and the 36th of the Abbasid dynasty), succeeding his father, al-Zahir bi-Amr Allah, who died only nine months after succeeding to the Caliphate.
- August 8 – Siege of Avignon: After two months without forcing the defenders of Avignon to surrender from lack of food, King Louis VIII gives the order to assault the walls of the city and Guy II, Count of Saint-Pol, begins the second phase of the siege, digging trenches facing the city walls – which are connected on both sides of the Rhône with pontoon bridges. Firing from the fortress towers, the defenders repulse the attack and Count Guy is killed by a catapulted stone on the same day.
- August – At Xingqing in what is now China's Yinchuan province, Emperor Xianzong of the Western Xia Empire dies after a three-year reign, and is succeeded by his nephew, Li Xian. The Mongols under Genghis Khan force the surrender of Western Xia the following year, bringing an end to the Yinchuan province as a separate nation.
- September 9 – After Avignon's defenders negotiate a peaceful resolution with the French Army by the payment of an indemnity of 6,000 marks, the gates of the walled city are opened and Louis enters the city without violence.
- September 11 – The Catholic Church practice of eucharistic adoration among lay people formally begins in Avignon, Provence.

=== October – December ===
- October 30 – Trần Thủ Độ, head of the Trần dynasty of Vietnam, forces Lý Huệ Tông, the last emperor of the Lý dynasty, to commit suicide.
- November 8 – At the age of 12, Louis IX becomes the new King of France when his father, King Louis VIII, dies of dysentery at the Château de Montpensier while on his way back home after victory in the Albigensian Crusade. The boy's mother, Queen Blanche of Castile, rules the kingdom as regent during his minority.
- November 29 – The coronation of Louis IX as King of France takes place at the Reims Cathedral at the direction of Queen Blanche, who also orders the defeated French nobles from the Albigensian Crusade to swear allegiance to her son.
- December 23 – Jean Halgrin, the French Roman Catholic archbishop of Besançon, is offered the opportunity to be the Catholic patriarch of Constantinople, but declines the position because of health issues.F. Vigouroux (1912). Dictionnaire de la Bible. Vol. I. Letouzey et Ané.

=== By place ===
==== Europe ====
- The Teutonic Knights undertake a new Crusade, attempting to subdue the pagan Prussians, who occupy a part of the Baltic coast. They are invited to Poland by High Duke Konrad I of Masovia, a grandson of Bolesław III Wrymouth. Their task is to defend Masovia against raids of the Prussians. After defeating them, the German knights set up their own state, which they named after the pagan people they have all but annihilated – Prussia.
- King Sancho II of Portugal ("the Pious") launches an offensive against the Almohad Caliphate during the Reconquista, and takes the city of Elvas.
- Rǫgnvaldr Guðrøðarson is overthrown as ruler of the Kingdom of the Isles, and is replaced by his half-brother, Olaf the Black.

==== Mongol Empire ====
- Summer – Genghis Khan starts a campaign against the Tanguts, punishing the vassal kingdom of Western Xia (Xi Xia) for not contributing to the Mongol invasions. He assembles a large force (some 100,000 men), and lays siege to Liangzhou, second-largest city in Western Xia, which surrenders without resistance. In the autumn, Genghis crosses the Helan Mountains, and in November he lays siege to Lingwu. Meanwhile, Emperor Xianzong of Western Xia dies and is succeeded by his nephew Mo (or Li Xian).

=== By topic ===
==== Art and culture ====
- Brother Robert writes the Old Norse Tristrams saga ok Ísöndar, one of the rare fully surviving versions of the legend of Tristan and Iseult.

==== Religion ====
- The Carmelite Order is approved by Pope Honorius III in the bull Ut vivendi normam.

== Births ==
- April 16 – Mugaku Sogen, Chinese monk and adviser (d. 1286)
- June 21 – Bolesław V the Chaste, Polish nobleman (d. 1279)
- November 2 – Isabella de Clare, English noblewoman (d. 1264)
- Amato Ronconi, Italian nobleman, monk and hermit (d. 1292)
- Angelo da Foligno (or Conti), Italian cleric and priest (d. 1312)
- Ata-Malik Juvayni, Persian governor and historian (d. 1283)
- Bai Renfu (or Bai Pu), Chinese poet and playwright (d. 1306)
- Bar Hebraeus, Syrian scholar, historian and bishop (d. 1286)
- Blanche of Navarre (or Champagne), duchess of Brittany (d. 1283)
- Charles I, French nobleman and son of Louis VIII (d. 1285)
- Dietrich VI, German nobleman and knight (d. 1275)
- Gertrude of Austria, Austrian noblewoman (d. 1288)
- Herman VI, Margrave of Baden, German nobleman and knight (d. 1250)
- Maria of Brabant, Duchess of Bavaria, German noblewoman (d. 1256)
- Ulrich I, Count of Württemberg ("the Founder"), German nobleman (d. 1265)

== Deaths ==
- March 7 – William Longespée, English nobleman and knight (b. 1176)
- May 2 – Amaury I de Craon, French nobleman and knight (b. 1170)
- May 10 – Beatrice d'Este, Italian Benedictine nun and saint (b. 1192)
- June 5 – Henry Borwin II, Lord of Mecklenburg (or Burwy), German nobleman (b. 1170)
- July 2 – Waleran III (or Walram), duke of Limburg (b. 1165)
- July 11 – Al-Zahir bi-Amr Allah, caliph of the Abbasid Caliphate (b. 1175)
- August 8 – Guy II, Count of Saint-Pol, French nobleman and knight
- September 9 – Rudolf von Güttingen, Swiss abbot and bishop
- September 16 – Pandulf Verraccio, Italian bishop and politician
- October 3 – Francis of Assisi, founder of the Franciscan Order
- October 7 – Louis IV, Count of Chiny ("the Young"), French nobleman (b. 1173)
- October 22 – Renaud de Forez, French archbishop
- November 8 – Louis VIII ("the Lion"), king of France (b. 1187)
- November 15 – Frederick of Isenberg, German nobleman
- December 18 – Benedict of Sausetun, bishop of Rochester
- Aed mac Donn Ó Sochlachain, Irish musician and writer
- Bernart Arnaut d'Armagnac (or Arnaud), French troubadour
- Eleanor of Aragon, Spanish princess and countess (b. 1182)
- Falkes de Bréauté, Norman nobleman and High Sheriff
- Joseph ben Judah of Ceuta, Spanish physician and poet
- Roger de Montbegon, English nobleman and landowner
- Shenzong, Chinese emperor of Western Xia (b. 1163)
- William Brewer, English nobleman and High Sheriff
- Xian Zong, Chinese emperor of Western Xia (b. 1181)
