= 1182 in Ireland =

- Centuries: 11th; 12th; 13th; 14th
- Decades: 1160s; 1170s; 1180s; 1190s; 1200s
- See also: Other events of 1182; List of years in Ireland

Events from the year 1182 in Ireland.

== Incumbent ==
- Lord: John

== Events ==
- Hugh O’Loughlin led a battle at Dunbo against English forces; where his clan, the Kinel‑Owen, were defeated.
- The Kilcooly Abbey is founded, when the King of Thomond Donal Mor O’Brien granted lands to the Cistercians, to build one in Country Tipperary.

== Deaths ==
- Hugh O’Kaelly - Bishop of Oriel.
- Donnell O’Huallaghan - Archbishop of Munster.
