= Mongol conquest of Western Xia =

1205–1227 campaigns in northwest China

- Part of the Mongol conquest of China
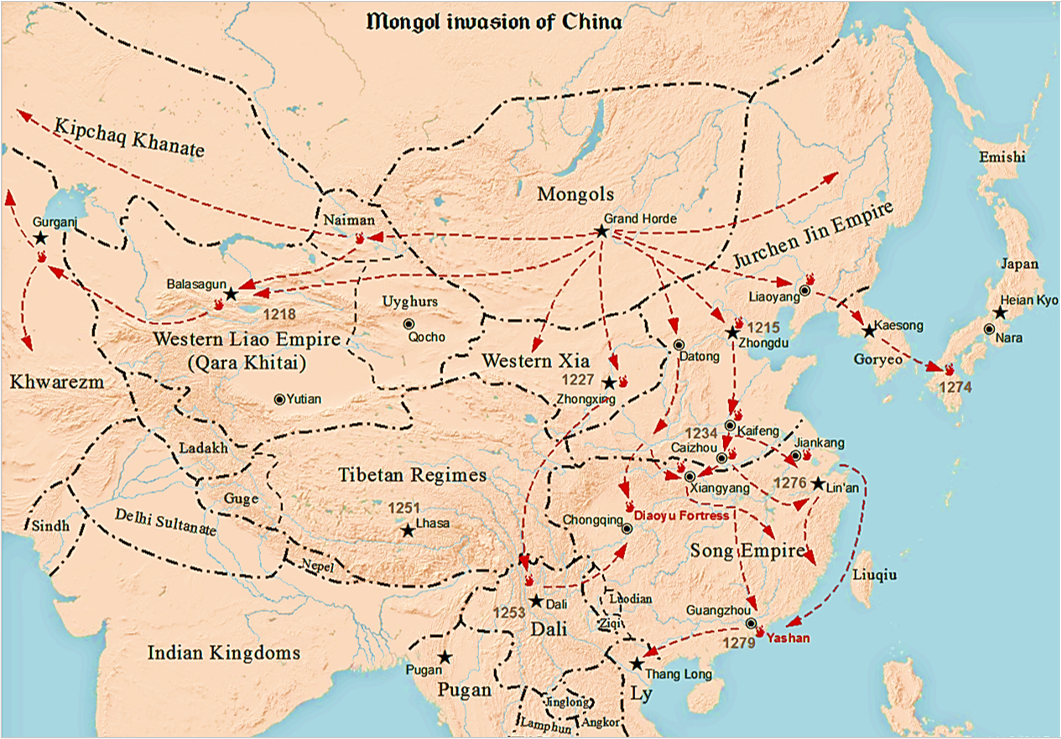
- Mongol conquest of Western Xia and other regimes of China
Date	1205–1210, 1225–1227
Location	Northwest China, Tibetan Plateau, Mongolian Plateau
Result	Mongol victory
Territorial changes	Western Xia lands absorbed into Mongol Empire

Belligerents
Mongol Empire	Western Xia; Jin dynasty

Commanders and leaders
Genghis Khan #/ (DOW); Ögedei Khan; Subutai; Tolui; Chagaan	Emperor Huanzong; Emperor Xiangzong (surrendered); Gao Lianghui; Weiming Linggong; Emperor Xianzong; Asha; Emperor Mo (executed)

Between 1205 and 1210, and again in 1225-1227, the Mongol Empire embarked on a series of military campaigns that ultimately led to the destruction of the Tangut-led Western Xia dynasty in northwestern China. Hoping to both to plunder and acquire vassalage, Genghis Khan commanded some initial raids against the Western Xia before launching a full-scale invasion in 1209. This was the first major invasion conducted by Genghis, and his first major incursion into China.

The Mongols began a siege of the Western Xia capital Yinchuan that lasted nearly a year, during which the Mongols tried to divert a river to flood the city, but accidentally flooded their own camp instead. Ultimately, Emperor Xiangzong of Western Xia surrendered to the Mongols in January 1210, marking the beginning of a decade of Western Xia vassalage under the Mongols, where they provided support for the Mongol conquest of the Jin dynasty. However, when Genghis invaded the Islamic Khwarazmian Empire in 1219, the Western Xia attempted to break away from Mongol vassalage and form alliances with the Jin and Song dynasties. Angered by the betrayal of the Western Xia, Genghis Khan began a second campaign against them, sending a punitive expedition into Western Xia in 1225. Genghis intended to annihilate the entire Western Xia culture: he methodically destroyed their cities and countryside, and began besieging Yinchuan in 1227. In December, near the end of the siege, Genghis Khan died of unknown causes, which has been presented by some accounts as being the result of wounds he had suffered against the Western Xia. Following Genghis's death, Yinchuan fell to the Mongols, and most of its population was massacred.

== Background ==
The Western Xia dynasty emerged in 1038—also called "Xi Xia", the "Tangut Empire", or "Minya"—and eventually controlled what are now the northwestern provinces of Ningxia, Gansu, eastern Qinghai, northern Shaanxi, northeastern Xinjiang, southwest Inner Mongolia, and southernmost Outer Mongolia. A fairly small state, Western Xia struggled against its larger and more powerful neighbors, the Liao dynasty to the east and northeast, and the Song dynasty to the southeast. When the Jin dynasty emerged in 1115 and displaced the Liao, Western Xia eventually accepted vassal status to the new Jin empire. Aiding Jin in their wars against the Song, Western Xia gained thousands of square miles of former Song territory. However, over many years the relations between Western Xia and Jin gradually declined.

Upon the death of its fourth ruler, Emperor Renzong, Emperor Huanzong took the throne and Western Xia's power began to fail. Though militarily inferior to neighboring Jin, the Western Xia still exerted a significant influence upon the northern steppes. The state often welcomed deposed Kerait leaders because of close trade connections to the steppes and because of the possibility of using the refugees as pawns in the Mongolian Plateau. In the late 1190s and early 1200s, Temüjin, soon to be Genghis Khan, began consolidating his power in Mongolia. Following the death of the Keraites leader Ong Khan to Temüjin's emerging Mongol Empire in 1203, Keriat leader Nilqa Senggum led a small band of followers into Western Xia. However, after his adherents took to plundering the locals, Nilqa Senggum was expelled from Western Xia territory.

== Preliminary raids ==
Using his rival Nilga Senggum's temporary refuge in Western Xia as a pretext, Temüjin launched a raid against the state in 1205 in the Edsin region. The Mongols plundered border settlements and one local Western Xia noble accepted Mongol supremacy. During a raid on Ganzhou (present-day Zhangye), the Mongols captured the son of the city's commander. This young boy joined Mongol service and took a Mongol name, Chagaan, and eventually rose through the ranks to become commander of Temüjin's personal guard. The next year, 1206, Temüjin was formally proclaimed Genghis Khan, ruler of all the Mongols, marking the official start of the Mongol Empire, while Li Anquan killed Huanzong of Western Xia in a coup d'état and installed himself as Emperor Xiangzong. In 1207, Genghis led another raid into Western Xia, invading the Ordos Plateau and sacking Wuhai, the main garrison along the Yellow River, before withdrawing in 1208. Genghis then began preparing for a full-scale invasion. By invading Western Xia, he would gain a tribute-paying vassal, and also would take control of caravan routes along the Silk Road and provide the Mongols with valuable revenue. Furthermore, from Western Xia he could launch raids into the even more wealthy Jin dynasty.

== First invasion (1209–1210) ==
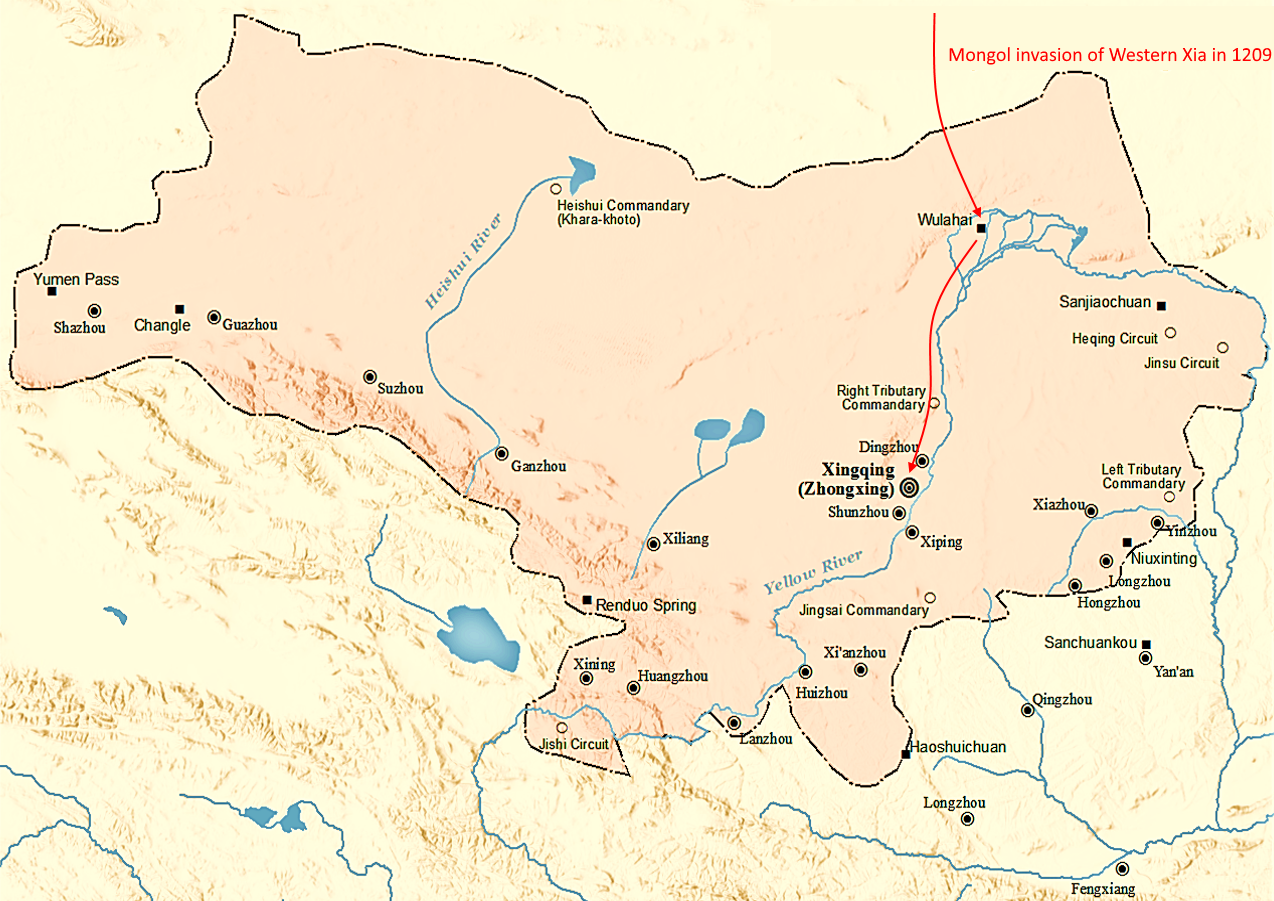
Mongol invasion of Western Xia in 1209

In 1209, Genghis undertook his campaign to actually conquer Western Xia. Emperor Xiangzong requested aid from the Jin dynasty, but the new Jin emperor Wanyan Yongji refused to send aid, stating that "It is to our advantage when our enemies attack each other. Wherein lies the danger to us?" After defeating a force led by Gao Lianghui outside Wulahai, Genghis captured the city and pushed up along the Yellow River, defeating several cities as he went, until he reached the fortress Kiemen which guarded the only pass through the Helan Mountains to the capital, Yinchuan. Containing an army of up to 70,000, plus 50,000 reinforcements, the fortress proved too difficult to capture, and after a two-month stand-off the Mongols feinted a retreat, luring the garrison, led by Weiming Linggong, out onto the field where it was easily destroyed. His path now open, Genghis advanced to the capital. Well fortified, Yinchuan held about 150,000 soldiers, nearly twice the size of the Mongol army. One of their first endeavors at siege warfare, the Mongols lacked the proper equipment and experience to take the city. They arrived at the city in May, but by October were still unsuccessful at breaking through. Genghis attempted to flood the capital by diverting the river and its network of irrigation canals into the city, and by January 1210 the walls of Yinchuan were nearly breached. However, the dike used to divert the river broke, and the ensuing flood wiped out the Mongol camp, forcing the Mongols to take the higher ground. Despite this setback, the Mongols still posed a threat to Western Xia, and with the state's crops destroyed and no relief coming from the Jin, Emperor Xiangzong agreed to submit to Mongol rule, demonstrating his loyalty by giving a daughter, Chaka, in marriage to Genghis and paying a tribute of camels, falcons, and textiles.

== Mongol vassalage (1210–1224) ==
In 1210, Western Xia attacked the Jin dynasty as punishment for their refusal to aid them against the Mongols. The following year, the Mongols joined Western Xia and began a 23-year-long war against Jin. The same year Li Anquan abdicated the throne, and subsequently died, after Emperor Shenzong seized power.

However, despite aiding the Mongols against Jin, in 1217 when Genghis Khan requested help for his Central Asian campaigns, Western Xia refused to commit troops, and as a warning the Mongols besieged the capital before withdrawing. In 1219, Genghis Khan launched his campaign against the Khwarazmian dynasty in Central Asia, and requested military aid from Western Xia. However, the emperor and his military commander Asha refused to take part in the campaign, stating that if Genghis had too few troops to attack the Khwarazmian dynasty, then he had no claim to supreme power. Infuriated, Genghis swore vengeance and left to invade Khwarazm, while Western Xia attempted alliances with the Jin and Song dynasties against the Mongols.

== Second invasion (1225–1227) ==
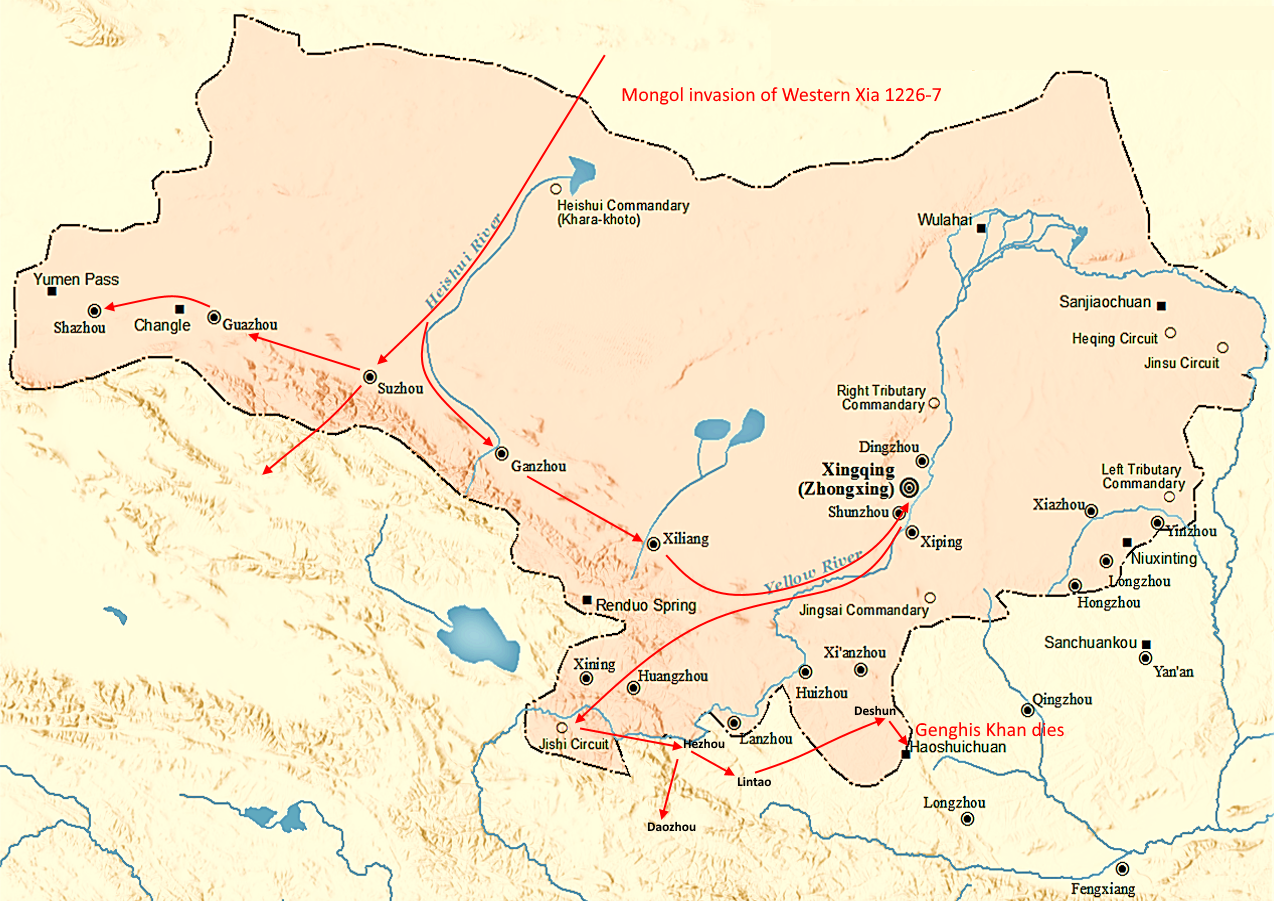
Mongol invasion of Western Xia, 1226-1227

After defeating Khwarazm in 1221, Genghis prepared his armies to punish Western Xia for their betrayal. Meanwhile, Emperor Shenzong stepped down from power in 1223, leaving his son Xianzong in his place. In 1225, Genghis Khan attacked with a force of approximately 180,000. After taking Khara-Khoto, the Mongols began a steady advance southward. Asha, commander of the Western Xia troops, could not afford to meet the Mongols as it would involve an exhausting westward march from the capital Yinchuan through 500 kilometers of desert. With no army to meet them in pitched battle, the Mongols picked the best targets for attack and as each city fell the Mongols would draw on prisoners, defectors, supplies, and weapons to take the next one. Enraged by Western Xia's fierce resistance, Genghis annihilated the countryside, ordering his generals to systematically destroy cities and garrisons as they went. Two months after taking Khara-Khoto, the Mongols reached a point where the Qilian Mountains force the Ruo Shui eastward, about 300 kilometers south of Khara-Khoto. At this point, Genghis divided his army, sending general Subutai to take care of the westernmost cities, while the main force moved east into the heart of the Western Xia Empire. Genghis lay siege to Suzhou, which fell after five weeks. Genghis then moved to Ganzhou, the hometown of his general Chagaan. Chagaan's father still commanded the city garrison, so Chagaan attempted negotiations with him. However, the second-in-command of the city staged a coup, killed Chagaan's father, and refused to surrender. The city took five months to subdue, and though the now furious Genghis threatened vengeance, Chagaan convinced him to only kill the 35 conspirators who killed Chagaan's father.

In August 1226, Genghis escaped the heat by residing in the Qilian Mountains while his troops approached Wuwei, the second-largest city of the Western Xia empire. As no relief came from the capital, Wuwei decided to surrender and avoid certain destruction. At this point, Emperor Xianzong died, leaving Mozhu to deal with a collapsing state as the Mongols encroached on the capital. In Autumn, Genghis rejoined his troops, took Liangzhou, crossed the Helan Shan desert, and in November lay siege to Lingwu, a mere 30 kilometers from Yinchuan. Here, in the Battle of Yellow River, Western Xia led a counter-attack with an estimated force of over 300,000 troops, engaging Mongol forces along the banks of the frozen river and canal systems. The Mongols destroyed the Western Xia troops, supposedly counting 300,000 bodies of Western Xia soldiers after the battle.

Upon reaching Yinchuan in 1227 and setting siege to the city, Genghis prepared to invade the Jin dynasty in order to neutralize any threat of them sending relief troops to Western Xia as well as setting the stage for a final conquest of the Jin empire. Genghis sent a force under his son Ögedei Khan and commander Chagaan toward the southern border, and they pushed into Jin territories along the Wei River and south Shaanxi, even sending some troops over the Qinling to threaten the Jin capital at Kaifeng. Genghis himself rejoined with Subutai and headed southwest to slice across an approximately 150 kilometer-wide territory mainly in present-day Ningxia and Gansu. Subutai crossed the northern parts of the Liupan mountain range, zigzagging from town to town throughout February and March, and conquered the Tao River valley and Lanzhou region. Meanwhile, Genghis went due south, following the Qing Shui river.

Back in Western Xia, Yinchuan lay besieged for about six months, and Genghis, himself busy directing a siege of Longde, sent Chagaan to negotiate terms. Chagaan reported that the emperor agreed to capitulate, but wanted a month to prepare suitable gifts. Genghis agreed, though secretly planned to kill the emperor. During the peace negotiations, Genghis continued his military operations around the Liupan mountains near Guyuan, rejected an offer of peace from the Jin, and prepared to invade them near their border with the Song. However, in August 1227, Genghis died of a historically uncertain cause, and, in order not to jeopardize the ongoing campaign, his death was kept a secret. In September 1227, Emperor Mozhu surrendered to the Mongols and was promptly executed. The Mongols then mercilessly pillaged Yinchuan, slaughtered the city's population, plundered the imperial tombs west of the city, and completed the effective annihilation of the Western Xia state.

=== Death of Genghis Khan ===
In August 1227, during the fall of Yinchuan, Genghis Khan died. The exact cause of his death remains a mystery, and is variously attributed to being killed in action by Western Xia, falling from his horse, illness, or wounds sustained in hunting or battle. The Galician–Volhynian Chronicle alleges he was killed by the Western Xia in battle, while Marco Polo wrote that he died after the infection of an arrow wound he received during his final campaign. Later Mongol chronicles connect Genghis' death with a Western Xia princess taken as war booty. One chronicle from the early 17th century even relates the legend that the princess hid a small dagger and stabbed him; some Mongol authors suspected this legend to be an invention by the rival Oirats.

== Aftermath ==
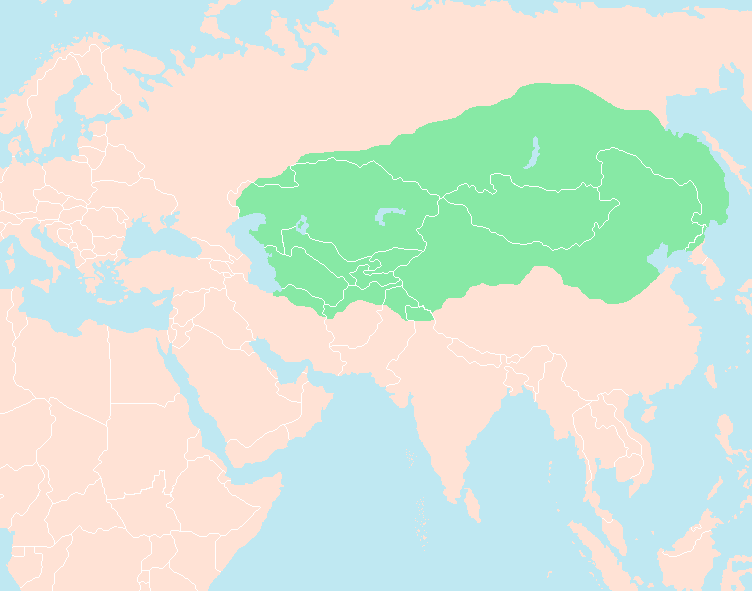
Mongol Empire at the time of Genghis Khan's death in 1227.

The destruction of Western Xia during the second campaign was near total. According to John Man, Western Xia is little known to anyone other than experts in the field precisely because of Genghis Khan's policy calling for their complete eradication. He states that "There is a case to be made that this was the first ever recorded example of attempted genocide, it was certainly very successful ethnocide."

However, some members of the Western Xia royal clan emigrated to western Sichuan, northern Tibet, even possibly northeast India, in some instances becoming local rulers. A small Western Xia state was established in Tibet along the upper reaches of the Yalong River, while other Western Xia populations settled in what are now the modern provinces of Henan and Hebei. In China, remnants of the Western Xia persisted into the middle of the Ming dynasty.

Despite the death of Genghis, the Mongol Empire was at last successful in defeating Western Xia. Now, Genghis Khan's successors concentrated on unifying the rest of China. The Jin dynasty, already reeling from great losses of land and troops due to the ongoing Mongol campaign since 1211, finally collapsed in 1234. The Kingdom of Dali in southwest China fell in an invasion in 1253, and the Song in the south, after over four decades of a conflict begun 1235, surrendered in 1279.
