= Western Xia mausoleums =

Historical tombs in China

Xixia Imperial Tombs
UNESCO World Heritage Site
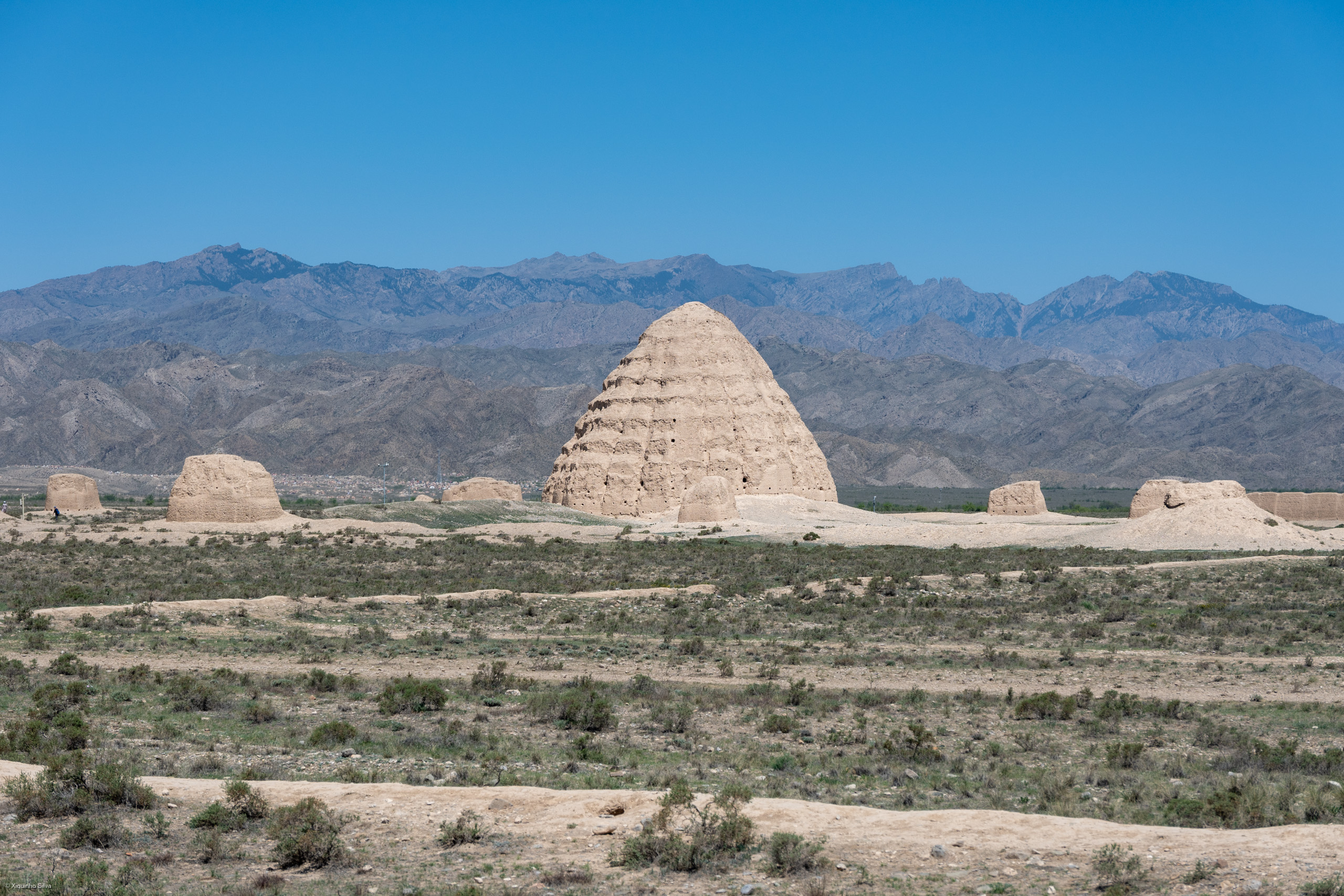
- Tomb no 2 and Helan Mountains in the background

- Location within China
- Criteria: ii, iii
- Reference: 1736
- Inscription: 2025 (47th Session)
- Extensions: 3,899 ha
- Coordinates: 38°26′06″N 105°59′14″E

The Western Xia mausoleums include nine imperial mausoleums and about 250 tombs of imperial relatives and officials of the Western Xia dynasty. The burial complex occupies an area of some 50 km^{2} (19 sq mi) at the foot of the Helan Mountains some 40 km (25 mi) westward from the capital city of the Western Xia, Xingqing, what is modern-day Yinchuan, now capital of the Ningxia Hui Autonomous Region in northwestern China.

Some 17,000 m^{2} (180,000 sq ft) have so far been excavated, and efforts are underway to secure and preserve the remains of a poorly understood era.

== History ==
The Western Xia dynasty existed between 1038 and 1227, when it was conquered by the Mongols under Genghis Khan. The empire was founded by the Tangut people, about which little is currently known. Only mausoleum No.3 has been adequately excavated and researched. This mausoleum is attributed to Western Xia's first emperor Jingzong, born Li Yuanhao (1003–1048), and has been determined as a pavilion-tower construction fusing both traditional mausoleum and temple styles with Buddhist characteristics.

The Western Xia capital city and the burial complex eluded early 20th century explorers of Central Asia, including Pyotr Kozlov, Aurel Stein and Sven Hedin. Wulf-Dieter Graf zu Castell recorded the site in an aerial photograph published 1938 in his book Chinaflug.

In 2019, the accompanying museum complex was moved outside the protected area in order to prepare for a bid as a World Heritage Site. They were included by UNESCO as Xixia Imperial Tombs in 2025.

== Imperial mausoleums ==
The area occupied by the Western Xia tombs runs from south-west to north-east along the eastern foothills of the Helan Mountains, about 12 km in length and up to 2.5 km in width. The earliest mausoleums appear to have been built at the southern end, with later construction moving seemingly step by step towards the north.

All mausoleums have a similar layout, generally comprising a rectangular outer enclosing wall with a pair of gate towers at the southern end, one or more pavilions (usually a pair) housing memorial steles, a rectangular barbican in front of the entrance to a square or rectangular inner enclosure, with watch towers at the four corners. The solid tomb mound built over the site of the burial is constructed from rammed earth. It is positioned off-centre, in the north-west part of the inner enclosure, and is up to 30 metres across and 23 metres in height. There are holes in the tomb mounds that would have originally supported wooden beams, and as large numbers of tiles have been found in each mausoleum, it is believed that the surviving mounds were merely the core of a more substantial architectural monument, coated with bricks, tiled eaves and decorative sculptures on each level.

Mausoleums 1 and 2 are situated close together at the southern tip of the tomb complex, they are the two largest tombs with their outer enclosures both measuring 340 × 224 metres. These two are believed to be occupied by the grandfather, Li Jiqian, and father, Li Deming, of Li Yuanhao, the first Emperor of the Western Xia.

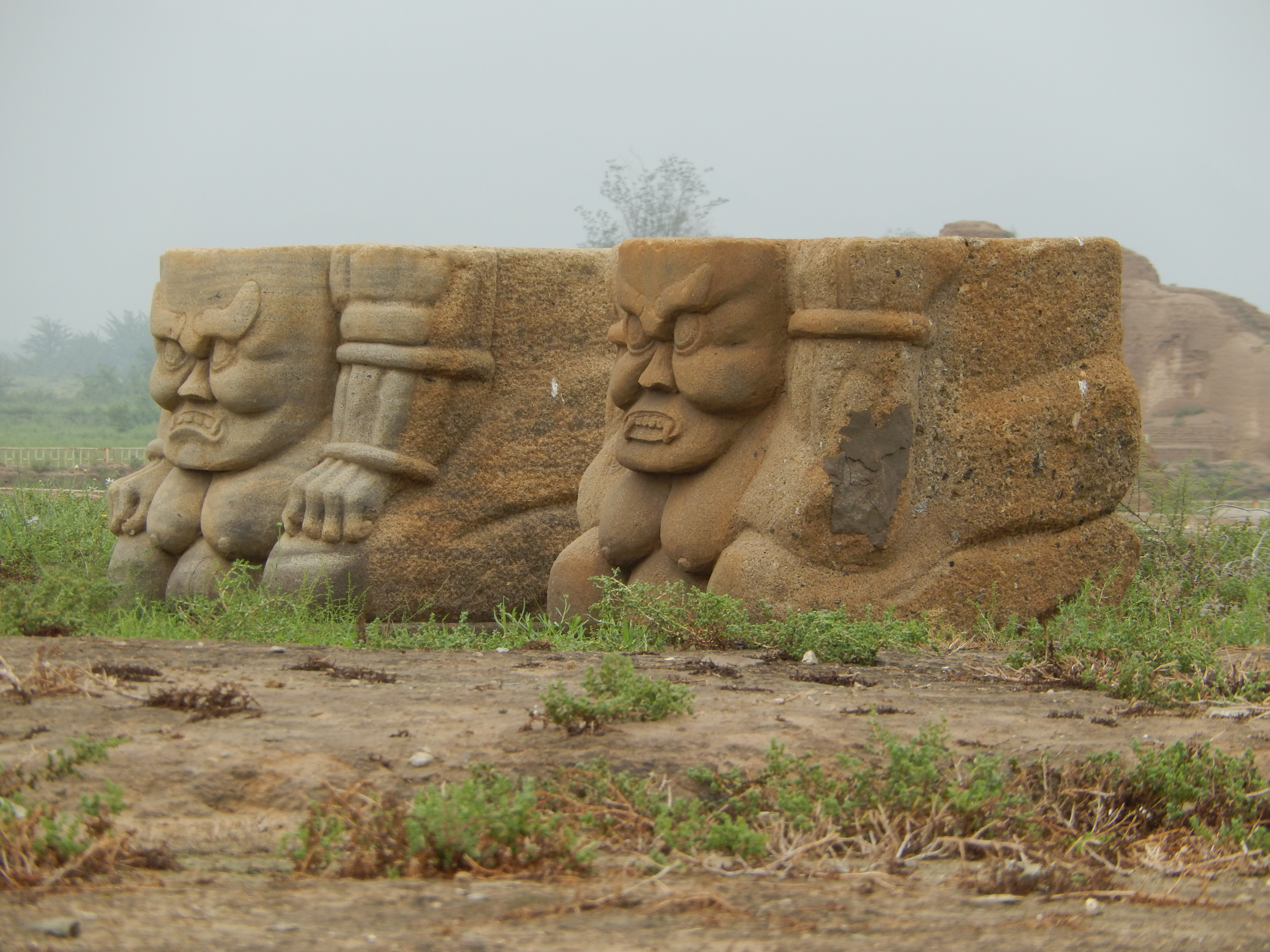
Stele bases of Tomb no. 3

Mausoleums 3 and 4 are about 4 km further north, with Mausoleum 3 at the eastern edge of the tomb area, and Mausoleum 4 situated about 2 km to the west, just next to the mountains. It is believed that Mausoleum 3 is occupied by Emperor Jingzong (1st emperor, reigned 1038–1048) and Mausoleum 4 is occupied by Emperor Yizong (2nd emperor, reigned 1048–1068).

About 2 km further north are Mausoleums 5 and 6, which are believed to be occupied by Emperors Huizong (3rd emperor, reigned 1068–1086) and Chongzong (4th emperor, reigned 1086–1139) respectively. In the early 1970s, the latter was excavated since its surface remains were relatively well-preserved. After more than two years of excavation, the excavation team entered the underground palace only to discover that it had been completely looted.

About 3 km further north are a group of three mausoleums for Emperors Renzong (5th emperor, reigned 1139–1193), Huanzong (6th emperor, reigned 1193–1206), and Xiangzong (7th emperor, reigned 1206–1211). This area was developed for industrial use during the 1970s, and part of Mausoleum 7 and most of Mausoleums 8 and 9 were built over, although the tomb mounds still survive. The modem buildings have now all been demolished.

There are no mausoleums for the last three Western Xia emperors, Shenzong (8th emperor, reigned 1211–1223), Xianzong (9th emperor, reigned 1223–1226), and Modi (last emperor, reigned 1226–1227), likely because the Western Xia empire was destroyed by the Mongols before there was time to build their tombs. However, it has been suggested that Tomb 161, which is the largest other tomb in the tomb complex (165 metres long and 100 metres wide) is the joint imperial tomb for emperors Shenzong and Xianzong. This tomb is situated about 200 metres south-west of Mausoleum 6, and although it is large compared to the other ordinary tombs, it is still smaller than the imperial mausoleums, and does not share the same complex layout as the imperial mausoleums. If Shenzong and Xianzong are indeed buried in Tomb 161, then it would be the only mausoleum that does not follow the south-to-north order.

No.	Name	Occupant	Photo	Section Plan
1	Yuling (裕陵)	Li Jiqian (963–1004)	Mausoleum of Li Jiqian	
2	Jialing (嘉陵)	Li Deming (981–1032)	Mausoleum of Li Deming	Plan of Mausoleum 2
3	Tailing (泰陵)	Emperor Jingzong (1003–1048, reigned 1038–1048)	Mausoleum of Li Yuanhao	
4	Anling (安陵)	Emperor Yizong (1047–1068, reigned 1048–1068)	Mausoleum of Li Liangzuo	
5	Xianling (獻陵)	Emperor Huizong (1061–1086, reigned 1068–1086)		
6	Xianling (顯陵)	Emperor Chongzong (1083–1139, reigned 1086–1139)		
7	Shouling (壽陵)	Emperor Renzong (1124–1193, reigned 1139–1193)		
8	Zhuangling (莊陵)	Emperor Huanzong (1177–1206, reigned 1193–1206)		
9	Kangling (康陵)	Emperor Xiangzong (1170–1211, reigned 1206–1211)		

== Subordinate tombs ==
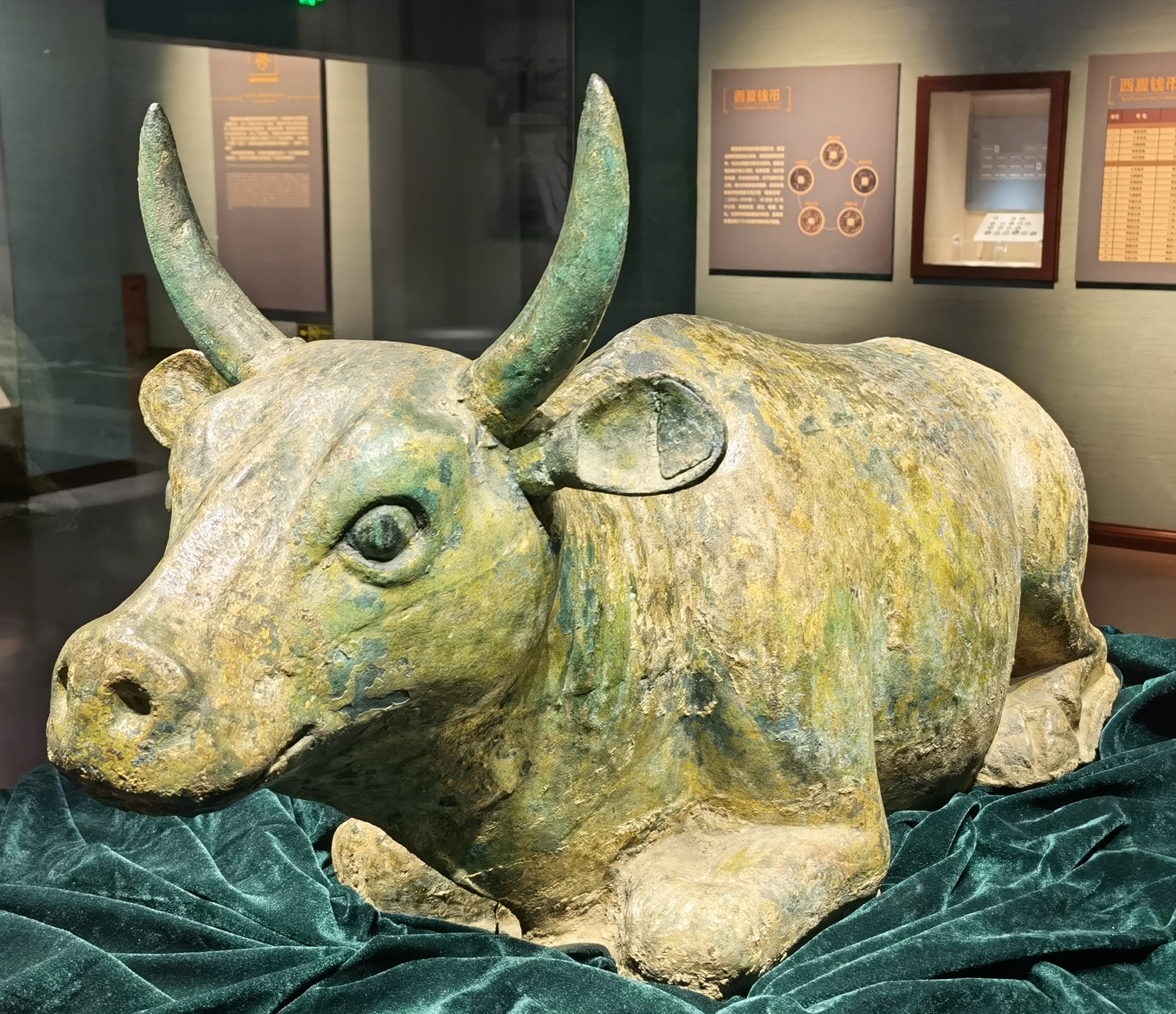
Western Xia gilded Bronze Ox

In 1977, the archaeological team that previously excavated Mausoleum No. 6 chose to excavate Tomb No. 101, which was relatively large and had no obvious signs of looting. After eight months of excavation, they found that it had indeed been looted. However, in the silt on the east wall of the passageway, 0.4 meters below the ground, they discovered a 1.2 meter long, 188 kilogram gilded bronze ox.

== Gallery ==
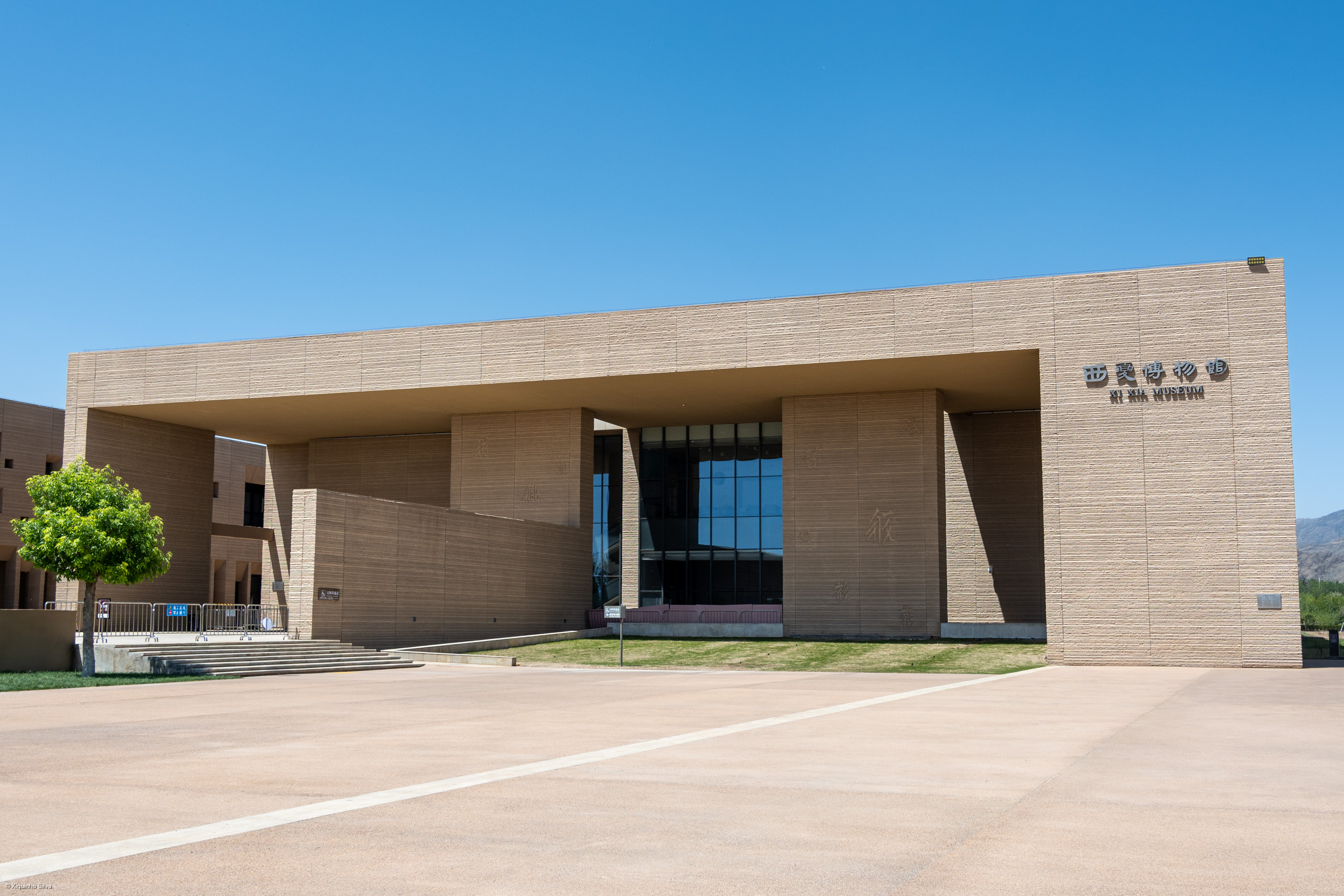
New Xi Xia Museum

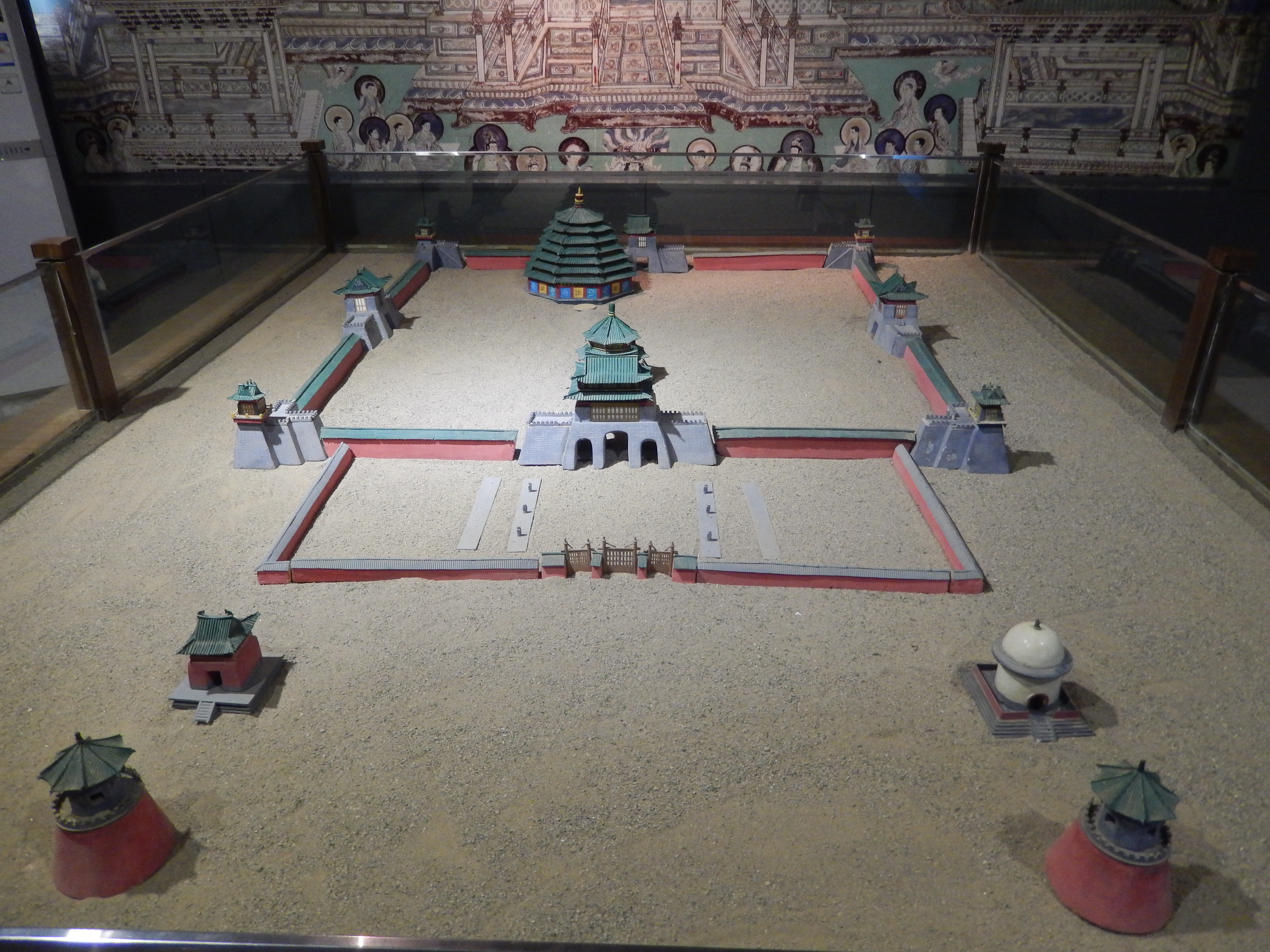
Model of Mausoleum 3

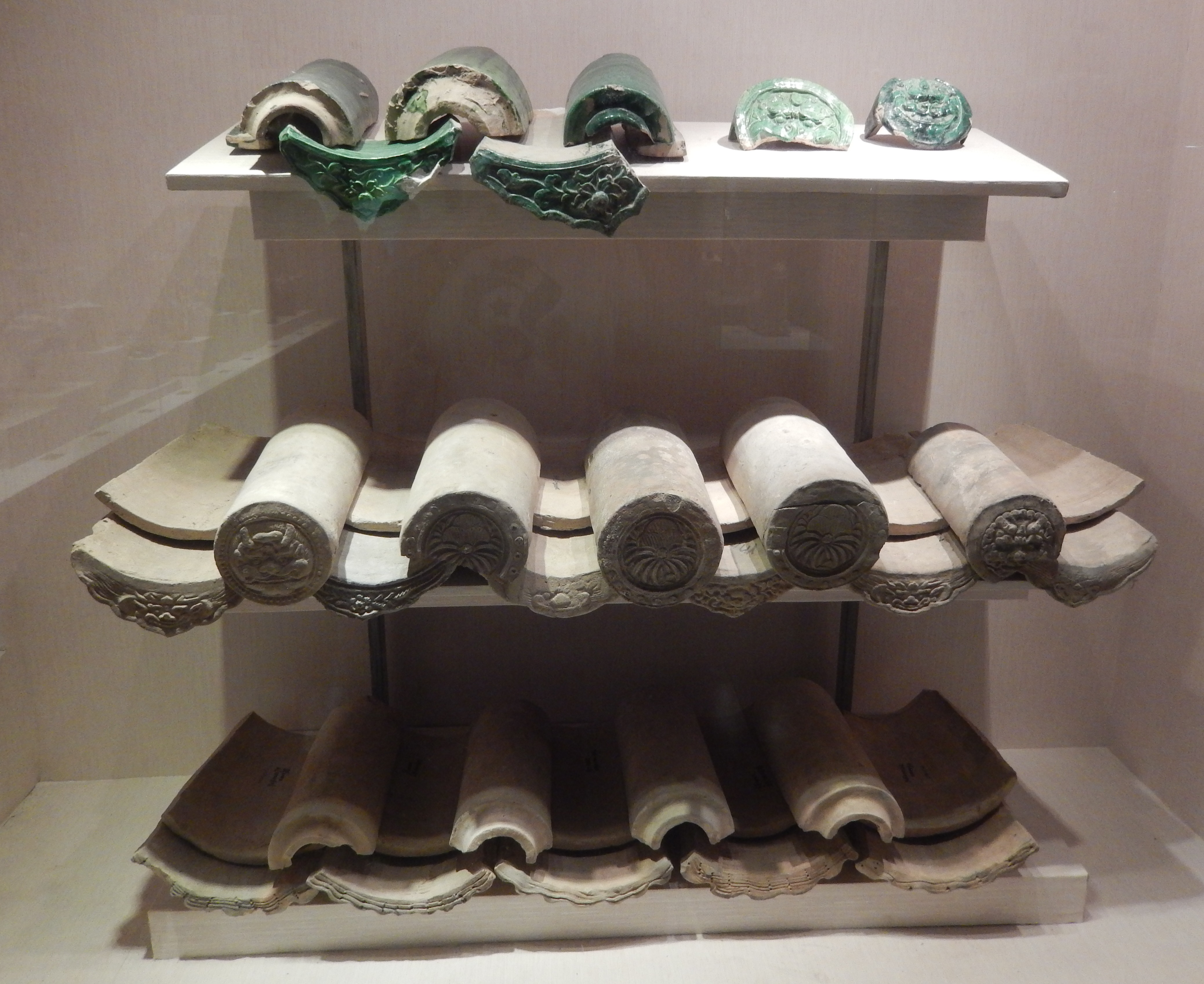
Roof tiles

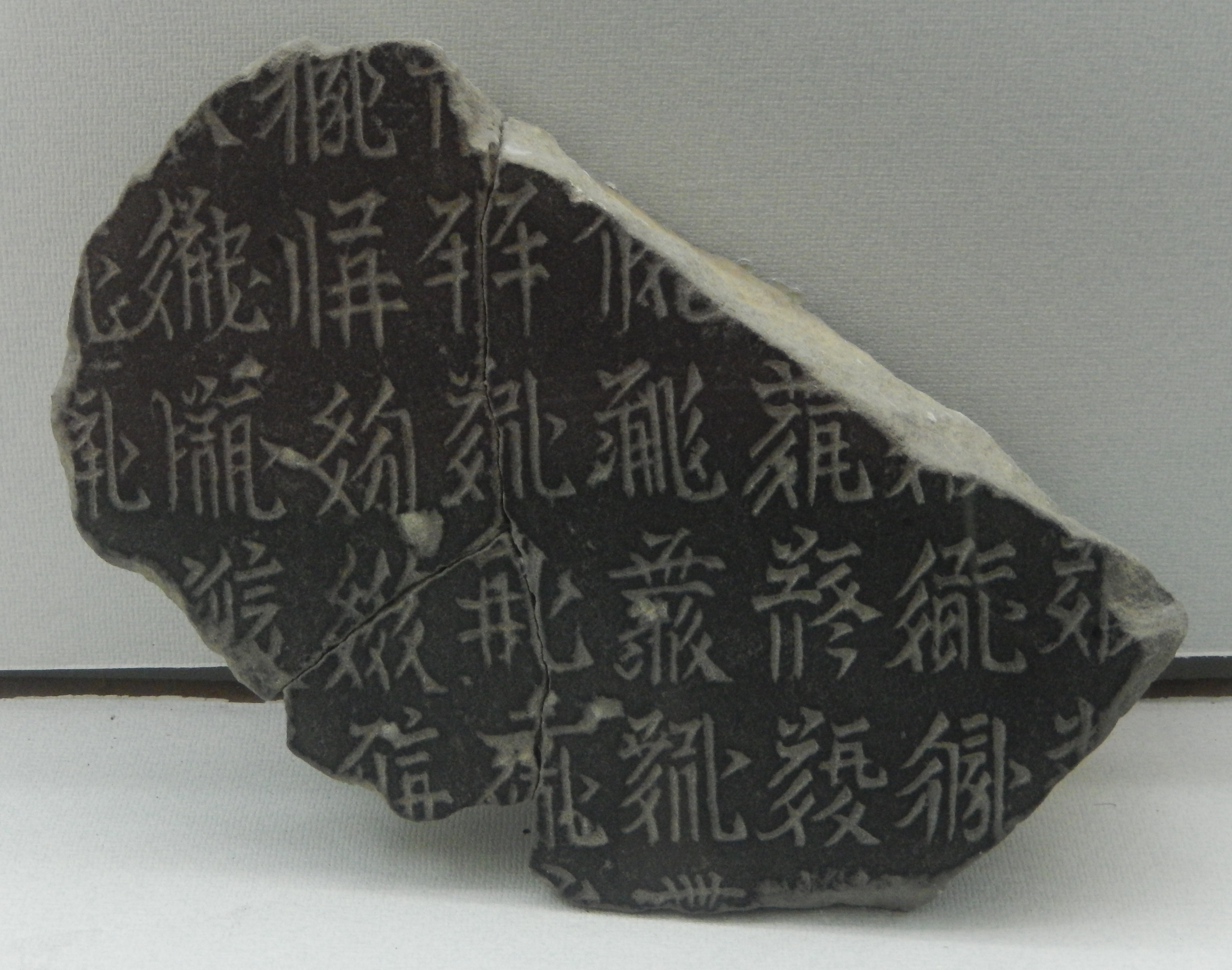
Stele fragment with Tangut script
