= 1191 in Ireland =

- Centuries: 11th; 12th; 13th; 14th
- Decades: 1170s; 1180s; 1190s; 1200s; 1210s
- See also: Other events of 1191; List of years in Ireland

Events from the year 1191 in Ireland.

== Incumbent ==
- Lord: John

== Events ==
- Roderic (Ruaidrí) O’Conor, former High King and king of Connacht, set out from Connacht seeking forces to recover his kingdom, first reaching Tirconnell and then Tyrone without success. After the Ultonians and the English of Meath declined to aid him, he went into Munster, where the Sil-Murray granted him the lands of Tir Fiachrach and Kinelea of Echtge.

== Deaths ==
- Hugh Mac Carroon, Chief of Muintir
- Joseph O'Hea, Bishop of Hy-Kinsellagh
