= Shenzong =

- Chinese: 神宗
- Literal meaning: Spiritual Ancestor
Transcriptions
Standard Mandarin
- Hanyu Pinyin: Shénzōng
- Wade–Giles: Shen^{2}-tsung^{1}

Shenzong is the temple name used for several emperors of China. It may refer to:

- Emperor Shenzong of Song (1048–1085, reigned 1067–1085), emperor of the Song dynasty
- Emperor Shenzong of Western Xia (1163–1223, reigned 1211–1223), emperor of Western Xia
- Wanli Emperor (1563–1620, reigned 1572–1620), emperor of the Ming dynasty

== See also ==
- Shenzhen–Zhongshan Bridge, or Shenzhong Bridge, on the Pearl River Delta in China
- Thần Tông (disambiguation), Vietnamese equivalent
