= 1190 in Ireland =

- Centuries: 11th; 12th; 13th; 14th
- Decades: 1170s; 1180s; 1190s; 1200s; 1210s
- See also: Other events of 1190; List of years in Ireland

Events from the year 1190 in Ireland.

== Incumbent ==
- Lord: John

== Events ==
- Hugh de Lacy, 1st Earl of Ulster (~1176 – after 26 December 1242) was replaced as Viceroy of Ireland by Guillaume le Petil. He was later reappointed to serve as viceroy from 1205 to 1210.
- Killone Abbey was founded by Donal Mor O'Brien, King of Thomond and Munster.
- Knockmoy Abbey was founded as a Cistercian abbey by the King of Connacht, Cathal Crobhdearg Ua Conchobair, in what is now Abbeyknockmoy
