= 1189 in Ireland =

- Centuries: 11th; 12th; 13th; 14th
- Decades: 1160s; 1170s; 1180s; 1190s; 1200s
- See also: Other events of 1189; List of years in Ireland

== Incumbent ==
- Lord: John

== Events ==
- Giraldus Cambrensis (Gerald of Wales) writes the Expugnatio Hibernica about Henry II’s invasion of Ireland.
- Royal charter was granted to Dundalk
- Hugh de Lacy, 1st Earl of Ulster was appointed Viceroy of Ireland

== Deaths ==
- King Conchobar Maenmaige Ua Conchobair of Connacht was assassinated.
