= 1183 in Ireland =

- Centuries: 11th; 12th; 13th; 14th
- Decades: 1160s; 1170s; 1180s; 1190s; 1200s
- See also: Other events of 1183; List of years in Ireland

Events from the year 1183 in Ireland.

== Incumbent ==
- Lord: John

== Events ==
- John de Courcy provided for the establishment of a priory at the cathedral of Down with generous endowments to the Benedictines from Chester in England (free from all subjugation to Chester Cathedral).
