= 1175 in Ireland =

- Centuries: 11th; 12th; 13th; 14th
- Decades: 1150s; 1160s; 1170s; 1180s; 1190s
- See also: Other events of 1175; List of years in Ireland

== Events ==
- October – Treaty of Windsor is made between Henry II of England and Ruaidrí Ua Conchobair, High King of Ireland, who agrees to rule unoccupied territory as a vassal.
