= 1192 in Ireland =

- Centuries: 11th; 12th; 13th; 14th
- Decades: 1170s; 1180s; 1190s; 1200s; 1210s
- See also: Other events of 1192; List of years in Ireland

Events from the year 1192 in Ireland.

== Incumbent ==
- Lord: John

== Events ==
- St Patrick's Cathedral built in Dublin.
- A medieval church close to the site of the present St. John's Church, Ballymore Eustace is first mentioned in 1192.
