= 1184 in Ireland =

- Centuries: 11th; 12th; 13th; 14th
- Decades: 1160s; 1170s; 1180s; 1190s; 1200s
- See also: Other events of 1184; List of years in Ireland

Events from the year 1184 in Ireland.

== Incumbent ==
- Lord: John

== Events ==
- The castle which gave Newcastle, County Wicklow its name was completed. It was built on an earlier Irish fortification in the territory of the O'Byrne's by the Norman Hugh de Lacy, then-governor of Ireland under Henry II.
- Clones Abbey was destroyed by fire.
