= 1174 in Ireland =

- Centuries: 11th; 12th; 13th; 14th
- Decades: 1150s; 1160s; 1170s; 1180s; 1190s
- See also: Other events of 1174; List of years in Ireland

Events from the year 1174 in Ireland.

== Events ==
- Battle of Thurles Loughtagalla: 1174 Donal Mór Ó Brian defeats a Norman incursion into Thomond.

== Deaths ==
- 27 March – Gilla Meic Liac mac Diarmata, Archbishop of Armagh
- Machabeo, an Irish monk and saint, abbot of Armagh's monastery of Saint Peter and Saint Paul for over thirty years.
