= Abbeyknockmoy =

Village in County Galway, Ireland

Abbeyknockmoy Mainistir Chnoc Muaidhe
- Village
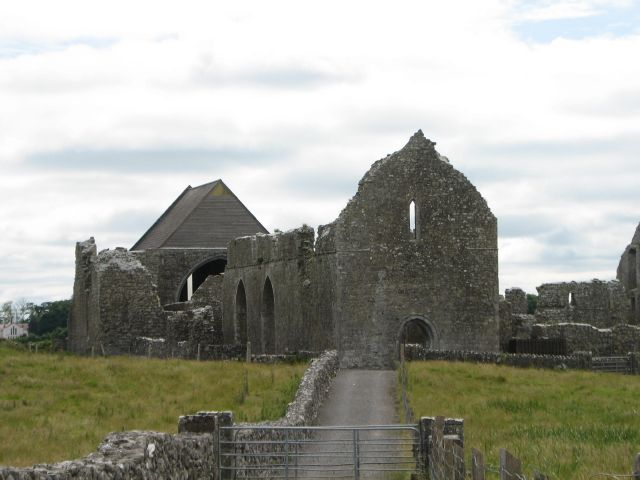
- Ruins of the 12th century Cistercian Knockmoy Abbey

- Location in Ireland
- Coordinates: 53°26′13.2″N 08°44′49.2″W
- Country: Ireland
- Province: Connacht
- County: Galway

Population (2022)
  - Total: 318

Abbeyknockmoy (Irish: Mainistir Chnoc Muaidhe, meaning 'Abbey of Muaidh's Hill') is a village and parish in County Galway, Ireland. It is known for the nearby ruins of the 12th century Cistercian abbey, established with the Kings of Connacht as its benefactors. The abbey was the burial site of King Cathal Crobhdearg Ua Conchobair and contains several examples of medieval wall paintings and sculpture. It was formerly part of the kingdom of the Soghain of Connacht.

== Abbey ==
Abbeyknockmoy was originally a Cistercian abbey founded in 1190 by the King of Connacht, Cathal Crobhdearg Ua Conchobair, in fulfilment of a vow made prior to a victory gained by Cathal against the English forces under Almeric de St. Lawrence. Cathal died a Cistercian monk and was buried there in 1224. The new abbey was occupied by Cistercian monks from Boyle Abbey. Substantial parts of the abbey remain, showing close links with other abbeys in the west of Ireland.

The abbey was decorated by medieval wall paintings, traces of which survive in the presbytery: they depict Saint Sebastian, the Crucifixion, the Trinity and the three living and three dead. One of the surviving fragments also depicts a hunting scene, indicating that hunting was popular in medieval Ireland. Additionally, the group of sculptors at Abbeyknockmoy can be identified as the same sculptors at work in Boyle Abbey. There is a capital that includes a fine example of a sculptured head: according to Roger Stalley, "there is a fine royal head on one of the nave piers. The nose and chin are smashed, but the carefully defined eyes, elaborate crown and long curly hair are still intact". He also suggests that the carved head actually represents Ua Conchobair, and "was perhaps a tribute to his benefactions".

The monastery was plundered by William de Burgo in 1200. In 1483, the abbot was accused of setting fire to the abbey.

== Community ==
Abbeyknockmoy is the home of St Bernards Utd, who won the Western Hygiene Premier Division Title in 2016; the highest League honour in Galway FA Junior soccer.

Abbeyknockmoy was designated as a census town by the Central Statistics Office for the first time in the 2016 census, at which time it had a population of 262 people. At the 2022 census the population was 318.

== Notable people ==
- Michael Coleman (1953–2025), hurler who won an All-Ireland hurling title with Galway in 1988
- David Connolly (b.1977), footballer who played for the Republic of Ireland national football team
- Clifton Wrottesley (b.1968), British politician and athlete who represented Ireland in the Men's Skeleton at the 2002 Winter Olympics

== See also ==
- List of towns and villages in Ireland
- List of abbeys and priories in Ireland (County Galway)
