= Thần Tông =

- Vietnamese alphabet: Thần Tông
- Chữ Hán: 神宗
- Literal meaning: Spiritual Ancestor

Thần Tông is the temple name used for several emperors of Vietnam, derived from the Chinese equivalent Shénzōng. It may refer to:

- Lý Thần Tông (1116–1138, reigned 1127–1138), emperor of the Lý dynasty
- Lê Thần Tông (1609–1662, reigned 1623–1643 and 1649–1662), emperor of the Lê dynasty
- Nguyễn Phúc Lan (1601–1648, reigned 1635–1648), one of the Nguyễn lords

== See also ==
- Shenzong (disambiguation), Chinese equivalent
