= 1180 in Ireland =

- Centuries: 11th; 12th; 13th; 14th
- Decades: 1160s; 1170s; 1180s; 1190s; 1200s
- See also: Other events of 1180; List of years in Ireland

Events from the year 1180 in Ireland.

== Incumbents ==
- Lord: John

== Events ==
- Construction of Carrickfergus Castle begins.
- St Mary's Cathedral built in Limerick.

== Arts and literature ==
- c.1180–1184 – The Tractatus de Purgatorio Sancti Patricii, a Latin text, was written by a monk who identified himself as H. of Saltrey and detailed the journey of an Irish knight, Owein, to St Patrick's Purgatory in Lough Derg, County Donegal

== Deaths ==
- 14 November – Laurence O’Toole
- Muirgheas Ua hEidhin, King of Uí Fiachrach Aidhne
