= 1176 in Ireland =

- Centuries: 11th; 12th; 13th; 14th
- Decades: 1150s; 1160s; 1170s; 1180s; 1190s
- See also: Other events of 1176; List of years in Ireland

Events from the year 1176 in Ireland.

== Events ==
- John de Courcy (also John de Courci) (d. 1219), an Anglo-Norman knight arrives in Ireland.

== Deaths ==
- Richard de Clare, 2nd Earl of Pembroke (Strongbow), who led the Norman invasion of Ireland (born 1130).
- Maurice FitzGerald, Lord of Lanstephan, soldier (b. c.1105)
