= 1177 in Ireland =

- Centuries: 11th; 12th; 13th; 14th
- Decades: 1150s; 1160s; 1170s; 1180s; 1190s
- See also: Other events of 1177; List of years in Ireland

Events from the year 1177 in Ireland.

== Incumbent ==
- Lord: John (from May)

== Events ==
- January–February – John de Courcy begins his conquest of Ulster, seizing Dun de Lethglas (Downpatrick).
- May – Council of Oxford: Prince John is made Lord of Ireland and speculative grants of the kingdoms of Cork and Limerick are made to Norman vassals. Royal administrators are also assigned to Leinster.
- June – John de Courcy defeats the last King of Ulster, Ruaidrí mac Con Ulad Mac Duinn Sléibe, in battle, going on to establish his capital at Carrickfergus and begin construction of Dundrum Castle in County Down.
- Áed in Macáem Tóinlesc, King of Ailech, is killed and deposed by Máel Sechlainn mac Muirchertaig Mac Lochlainn.
- The sons of Ruaidrí Ua Conchobair, High King of Connacht, rebel against him.
- Tyrell, Baron of Castleknock, granted lands at Kilmainham to the Priory of St. John of Jerusalem (Knights Hospitallers)
- Hugh de Lacy, Lord of Meath, built a motte-and-bailey fortification at Clonard, County Meath. It is still a well-known landmark in the village.

== Deaths ==
- Amlaid Ua Domhnalláin, poet
- In Timpanach Ua Connicén, poet (murdered)
- Áed in Macáem Tóinlesc, king (killed)
