= 1181 in Ireland =

- Centuries: 11th; 12th; 13th; 14th
- Decades: 1160s; 1170s; 1180s; 1190s; 1200s
- See also: Other events of 1181; List of years in Ireland

Events from the year 1181 in Ireland.

== Incumbent ==
- Lord: John

== Events ==
- Walter de Riddlesford built a motte and bailey fortress on the site of what is now Kilkea Castle in County Kildare.
- John, King of England granted Lambay Island to the Archbishops of Dublin.
- Hugh de Lacy, Lord of Meath was recalled from his government for having married Róis Ní Chonchobair, the daughter of Ruaidrí Ua Conchobair, King of Connaught and deposed High King of Ireland, without leave of Henry II of England.

== Deaths ==
- Tadhg Ua Dálaigh, poet.
