= 1185 in Ireland =

- Centuries: 11th; 12th; 13th; 14th
- Decades: 1160s; 1170s; 1180s; 1190s; 1200s
- See also: Other events of 1185; List of years in Ireland

Events from the year 1185 in Ireland.

== Incumbent ==
- Lord: John

== Events ==
- 25 April–December – John's first expedition to Ireland: King Henry II of England knights his son and heir, the 18-year-old Prince John, newly created Lord of Ireland, and sends him to Ireland, accompanied by 300 knights and a team of administrators to enforce English overlordship. Landing at Waterford, he treats the local Irish rulers with contempt, making fun of their unfashionable long beards. Also failing to make allies amongst the Anglo-Norman settlers, the English army is unable to subdue the Irish fighters in unfamiliar conditions and the expedition soon becomes a complete disaster, returning to England in defeat. Nonetheless, Henry gets John named 'King of Ireland' by Pope Urban III and procures a golden crown with peacock feathers. The expedition is accompanied and chronicled by Gerald of Wales.
- Cork charter is granted by Prince John.
- Occupation of lands in County Limerick begun by Theobald Walter, William de Burgh and Philip of Worcester.
- William de Burgh arrives in Ireland.
