= 1186 in Ireland =

- Centuries: 11th; 12th; 13th; 14th
- Decades: 1160s; 1170s; 1180s; 1190s; 1200s
- See also: Other events of 1186; List of years in Ireland

Events from the year 1186 in Ireland.

== Incumbent ==
- Lord: John

== Events ==
- Stephen Ridell appointed as first Lord Chancellor of Ireland.
- Hugh de Lacy the Elder, 1st Lord of Meath, is assassinated.
- Ruaidrí Ua Conchobair is usurped as King of Connacht by his son Conchobar Maenmaige Ua Conchobair.
- Approximate date of the construction of Ardfinnan Castle

== Deaths ==
- 25 July – Hugh de Lacy, Lord of Meath, 4th Baron Lacy
