= Emperor Xiangzong of Western Xia =

Emperor of Western Xia from 1206 to 1211

Emperor Xiangzong of Western Xia 西夏襄宗

Emperor of the Western Xia dynasty
- Reign: 1206–1211
- Predecessor: Emperor Huanzong
- Successor: Emperor Shenzong
- Born: 1170
- Died: 1211 (aged 40–41)
- Burial: Kangling Mausoleum (康陵, presumptively the No. 9 tomb of Western Xia mausoleums)
Names
- Weiming Anquan (嵬名安全); Li Anquan (李安全)
Era dates
- Yingtian (應天): 1206–1209; Huangjian (皇建): 1210–1211
Posthumous name
- Emperor Jingmu (敬慕皇帝)
Temple name
- Xiangzong (襄宗)

Emperor Xiangzong of Western Xia (1170–1211), born Li Anquan (Chinese: 李安全), was the seventh emperor of the Tangut-led Western Xia dynasty of China, reigning from 1206 to 1211. He launched attacks on the Jin dynasty, but eventually surrendered to the Mongol Empire under Genghis Khan.

== Reign ==
Li Anquan was a nephew of the Emperor Renzong. After the death of his father, Renyou, Li Anquan requested Huanzong to allow him inherit father's title. After Huanzong disagreed and bestowed upon him a title of Prince of Zhenyi commandery (鎮夷郡王), Li Anquan has been harbouring an intention to seize the imperial throne. Emperor Xiangzong came into power after a coup d'état with his first cousin Huanzong's birth mother, Empress Luo against Huanzong.

Many historians regarded him as incompetent.

Xiangzong attacked the Jin dynasty, destroying the years of peace between these two countries. He tried to become an ally of the Mongol Empire, but Genghis Khan regarded Western Xia as a roadblock to China and repeatedly invaded Western Xia.

Eventually, Li Anquan surrendered to the Mongols, gave his daughter, Chaka, in marriage to Genghis, and paid tribute of camels, falcons, and textiles.

In 1211, Xiangzong's nephew Lǐ Zūnxū initiated a coup d'état against Xiangzong and took power. Xiangzong died a month later.

== Family ==
Father: Li Renyou, Prince of Yue (越王李仁友)

Consorts and issue:

Daughter:

1. Princess Char (察合皇后, Mongolian: Чар хатан). Married Genghis Khan in 1209.
