= Emperor Xianzong of Western Xia =

Emperor of Western Xia from 1223 to 1226

Emperor Xianzong of Western Xia 西夏獻宗

Emperor of the Western Xia dynasty
- Reign: 1223–1226
- Predecessor: Emperor Shenzong
- Successor: Emperor Mo
- Born: 1181
- Died: 1226 (aged 44–45)
- Burial: Unknown, possibly the No. 161 attendant tomb of Western Xia mausoleums
Names
- Weiming Dewang (嵬名德旺); Li Dewang (李德旺)
Era name and dates
- Qianding (乾定, 𘀗𗪚): 1223–1226
Posthumous name
- None
Temple name
- Xiànzōng (獻宗, lit. "Dedicated Ancestor")
- Father: Emperor Shenzong

Emperor Xianzong of Western Xia (1181–1226), born Li Dewang (Chinese: 李德旺), was the ninth and penultimate emperor of the Western Xia dynasty of China, reigning from 1223 to 1226. He was the second son of the Emperor Shenzong who had abdicated in his favor.

== Reign ==
Emperor Xianzong inherited a weak empire as his predecessors' Emperor Xiangzong and Emperor Shenzong whose reckless attacks on the Jin dynasty and attempts to ally with the Mongols drained the economy. Emperor Xianzong changed his predecessors' policies and decided to ally with Jin dynasty. However, the Jin dynasty was under a barrage of assault from the Mongol Empire and was unable to help out Western Xia. Emperor Xianzong also changed the policy for Mongols. He decided to fight against the Mongol invaders instead of allying with them. However, the Western Xia armies were exhausted from long, incessant, and costly wars against the Jin, and were unable to repel the Mongol assaults. Xianzong died in 1226.
