= Emperor Huanzong of Western Xia =

Emperor of Western Xia from 1193 to 1206

Emperor Huanzong of Western Xia 西夏桓宗

Emperor of the Western Xia dynasty
- Reign: 1193–1206
- Predecessor: Emperor Renzong
- Successor: Emperor Xiangzong
- Born: 1177
- Died: 1206 (aged 28–29)
- Burial: Zhuangling Mausoleum (莊陵, presumptively the No. 8 tomb of Western Xia mausoleums)
Names
- Weiming Chunyou (嵬名純祐); Li Chunyou (李純祐)
Era name and dates
- Tianqing (天慶, 𘓺𘅝): 1194–1206
Posthumous name
- Emperor Zhaojian (昭簡皇帝, 𗭼𘜶𘓺𘋨)
Temple name
- Huanzong (桓宗)

Emperor Huanzong of Western Xia (1177–1206), born Li Chunyou (Chinese: 李純祐), was the sixth emperor of the Western Xia dynasty of China, reigning from 1193 to 1206.

== Reign ==
He was the son of Emperor Renzong, and tried to follow the policies dictated by his father. However, the high-ranking officials in the Western Xia government became more corrupt as time passed, starting the irreversible decline of the Western Xia. The rising of the Mongols under Genghis Khan began to pose threats as Mongols began raiding border villages. In 1205, Huanzong changed the name of the Western Xia capital to Zhongxing (now Yinchuan). Also in 1205, the Mongols began their first invasion of the Western Xia, pillaging and burning many outlying villages and cities. In 1206, his cousin Li Anquan, who became Emperor Xiangzong, started a coup d'état and took power from Huanzong. Huanzong died in the same year.
