= In Timpanach Ua Connicén =

In Timpanach Ua Connicén (died 1177) was an Irish poet.

The Annals of Lough Ce state that In Timpanach Ua Connicén, chief poet of the North of Erinn, was slain by the Cenél Conaill, together with his wife and family.

No context for the incident is given. It is uncertain what form the surname takes today.
