= 1188 in Ireland =

- Centuries: 11th; 12th; 13th; 14th
- Decades: 1160s; 1170s; 1180s; 1190s; 1200s
- See also: Other events of 1188; List of years in Ireland

Events from the year 1188 in Ireland.

== Incumbent ==
- Lord: John

== Deaths ==
- Melaghlin Ua Madadhan, King of Síol Anmchadha
- Muircertach Ua Brain, King of Breghmhuine.
