= Knockmoy Abbey =

Ruined Cistercian abbey in Galway, Ireland

- Mainistir Chnoc Muaidhe
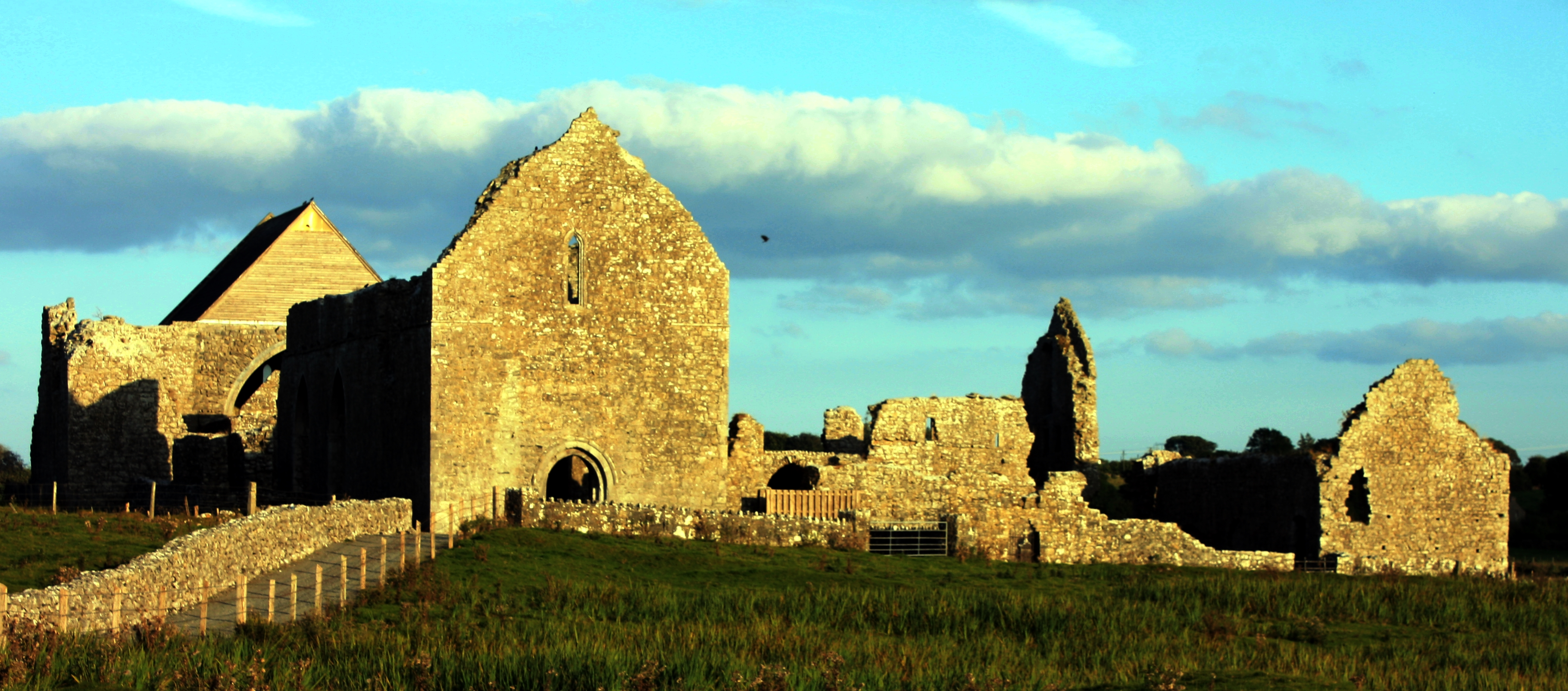
- The abbey in September 2014

- Location within Ireland
- Interactive map of Knockmoy Abbey

Monastery information
- Other names: Mainistir Chnoc Muaidhe, Monasterium Collis Victoriæ, Porta Magna, Porta Magna, Teampollandorusmoir
- Order: Cistercian
- Established: 1189
- Disestablished: 1542
- Mother house: Boyle Abbey
- Diocese: Galway, Kilmacduagh and Kilfenora

People
- Founder: Cathal Crobhdearg Ua Conchobair

Site
- Location: Abbeyknockmoy, Co. Galway
- Coordinates: 53°26′25″N 8°44′34″W
- Visible remains: Nave, two aisles, and a transept to the north and south. Includes some wall painting.
- Public access: Yes

Knockmoy Abbey (Irish: Mainistir Chnoc Muaidhe), also known as The Monastery of the Hill of Victory (Latin: Monasterium Collis Victoriæ); and as Porta Magna (English: Great Door) and Teampollandorusmoir (English: The Chapel with the Big Door) after the dissolution of the monasteries, is a ruined Cistercian abbey located in Abbeyknockmoy, County Galway, Ireland. Founded in 1198, the abbey is known for its wall-paintings.

== History ==
The abbey was founded in 1189 by Cathal Crobhdearg Ua Conchobair. Settled by monks from Boyle Abbey in County Roscommon, the abbey is located on the northern bank of the River Abbert in north east County Galway. The majority of the buildings that constitute the abbey date from the early 13th century, though it is likely further work was carried out in both the fifteenth and sixteenth centuries also.

Knockmoy was first plundered in either 1202 or 1203 by William de Burgh, and it was subsequently raided several other times, the next occasion being in 1228.

On 24 May 1542, following the dissolution of the monasteries, Hugh O'Kelly, the abbot in commendam surrendered the abbey to Henry VIII.

== Architecture ==
=== Composition of the monastery ===
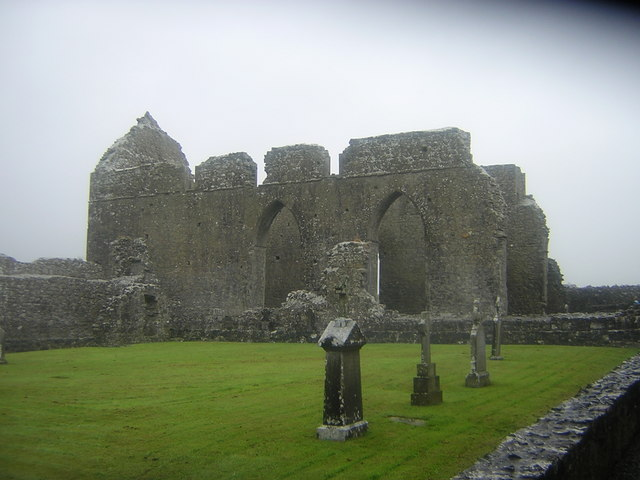
The abbey's cloister

Knockmoy Abbey's composition is largely typical of Cistercian monasteries. As a result, though there are no physical indications of whether or not the monastery had a tower, it is highly likely that the monastery had a low tower, a common feature of Cistercian friaries. Knockmoy is claustral in layout, though the cloister is now in use as a burial ground.

The monastery's church consists of a nave, two aisles, and a transept to the north and south, respectively. In each transept there are two side chapels. The nave is notably wide, and the transepts narrow. The laybrothers of the abbey would worship in the nave, while the monks would worship in the chancel. On the southwest corner of the church is a sculpture of a king, possibly Ua Conchobair. Though the nose and chin have broken away, the eyes, hair, and crown survive. The chancel ceiling is rib vaulted.

The ceiling of the sacristy is also vaulted, and dormitories were located above both the chancel and sacristy. Projecting eastward, and with a door on the first floor connecting to the dormitories was the garderobe. The walls of this building are not bonded with the rest of the monastery, and it is likely of fourteenth century construction.

The chapter room is also vaulted, and features a three-light window as well as two single-light windows. The three-light window is original, and features elaborately moulded jambs—the two single-light windows are of later construction, and feature rubble-work jambs. Cross-walls were added to the chapter room, blocking two of the three lights in the three-light window. It is possible that the two smaller windows were added at this point. The cross-walls divide the chapter room into three sections.

South of the chapter room was the calefactory, or the day room of the monks. Here a fire would have been kept for the monks to warm themselves by.

A section at the south end of the church formed the refectory. In the eastern end of the refectories south wall is an opening 2.7 metres (9 ft) wide, which would have featured steps leading up to a rostrum. Next to the refectory, to the south east, is a section of the monastery the function of which is difficult to ascertain. The walls here are in very poor condition, and having been reshaped several times to serve as a fence, give no indication as to the original placement of the windows. This may possibly have been the novices' rooms.

To the west of the cloister were buildings two storeys tall, which housed the lay brothers of the monastery. The lay brothers had a separate entrance to the church than the monks.

Close by the abbey is a modern mill, supposedly built on the site of a mill once belonging to the abbey.

=== Wall-paintings ===
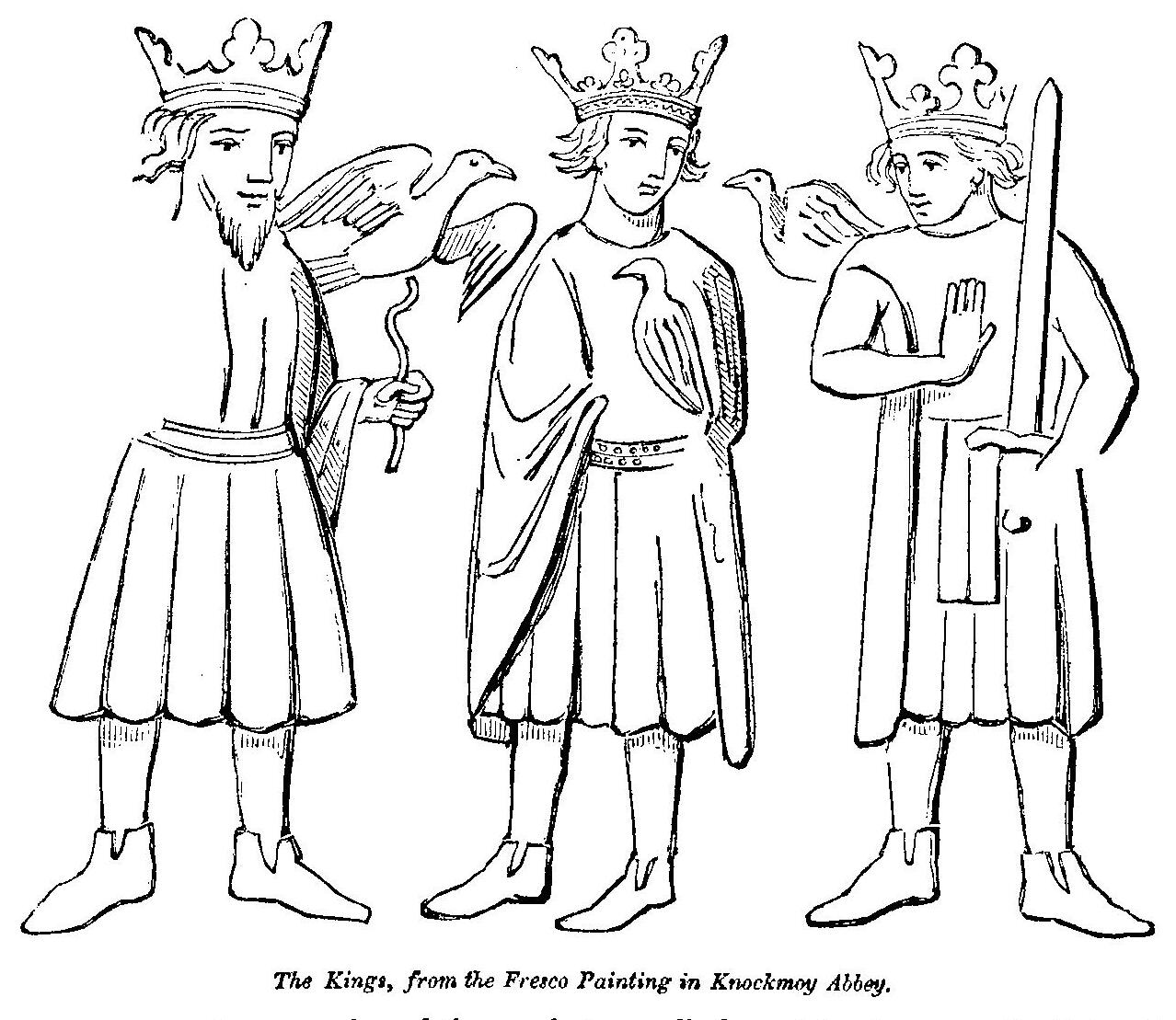
The main Irish Kings, Roderic O'Conor in the middle, from the fresco painting in Knockmoy, Dublin Penny Journal, 1833

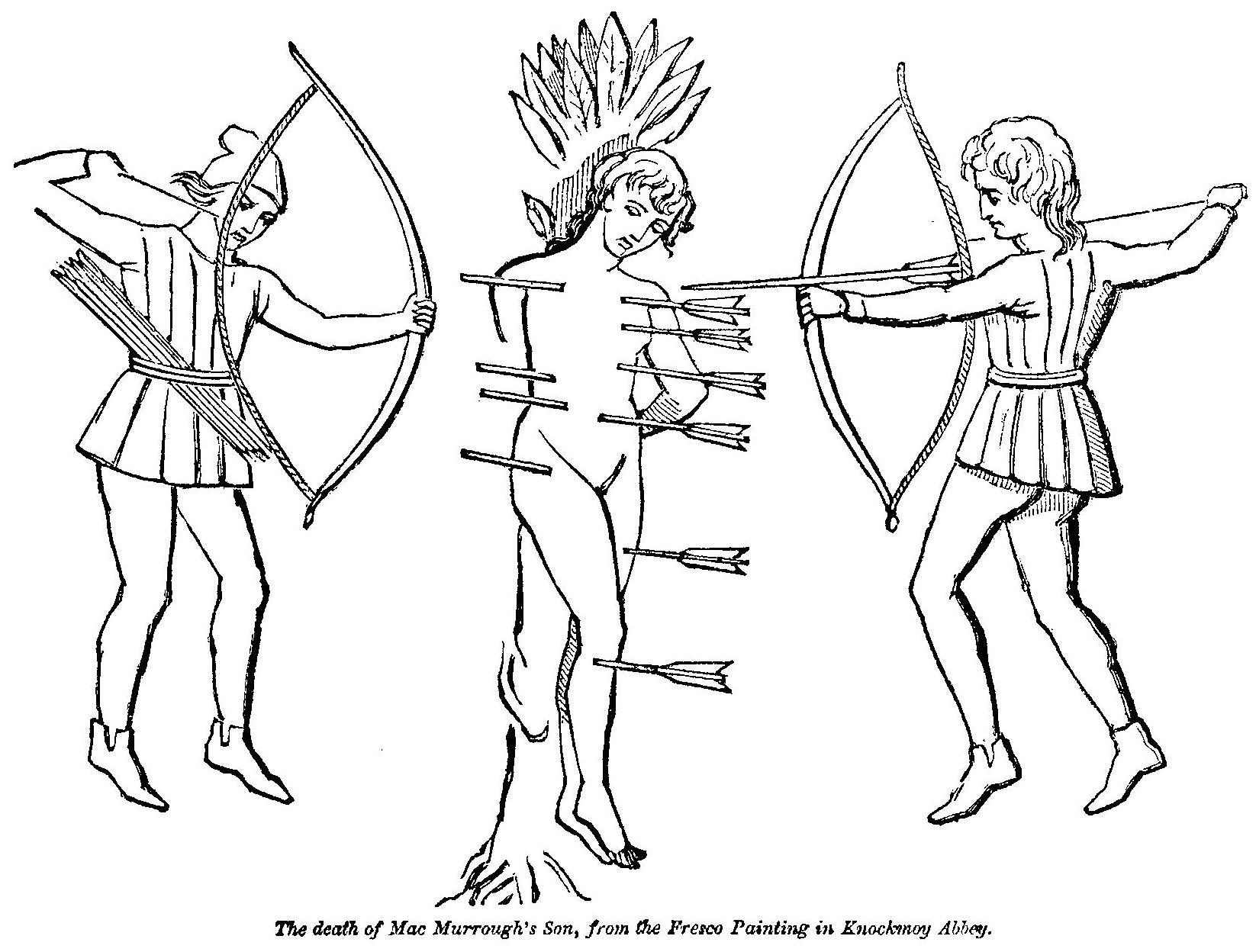
The death of Mac Murrough's son, from the fresco painting, sketched in 1833

The abbey is well known for its wall-paintings which once covered the entire north wall of the chancel of the abbey's church, though they are now partially destroyed. Though commonly referred to as frescoes, this is incorrect—they are in fact tempera, and there are no examples of true frescoes in any medieval churches in Ireland. The tempera at Knockmoy constitute one of a group of only four such artworks in Ireland. It is unclear whether or not they were once coloured. Long exposed to the elements, in the 1980s the Office of Public Works weather-proofed the segment of the abbey which houses them.
