= 1178 in Ireland =

- Centuries: 11th; 12th; 13th; 14th
- Decades: 1150s; 1160s; 1170s; 1180s; 1190s
- See also: Other events of 1178; List of years in Ireland

Events from the year 1178 in Ireland.

== Incumbent ==
- Lord: John

== Events ==
- St. Werburgh's Church in Dublin is established.

== Deaths ==
- Áedh Ua Flaithbheartaigh, king of Iar Connacht
