= Last Emperor of Western Xia =

Chinese emperor from 1226 to 1227

Last Emperor of Western Xia 西夏末帝

Emperor of the Western Xia dynasty
- Reign: 1226–1227
- Predecessor: Emperor Xianzong
- Died: 1227
Names
- Weiming Xian (嵬名晛); Li Xian (李晛); Shidurghu (失都兒忽)
Era name and dates
- Baoyi (寶義): 1226–1227
Posthumous name
- None
Temple name
- None

Emperor Mo of Xia
- Chinese: 夏末帝
- Literal meaning: "Last Emperor of Xia"
Transcriptions
Standard Mandarin
- Hanyu Pinyin: Xià Mòdì

Emperor Mozhu of Xia
- Chinese: 夏末主
- Literal meaning: "Last Ruler of Xia"
Transcriptions
Standard Mandarin
- Hanyu Pinyin: Xià Mòzhǔ

Li Xian
- Chinese: 李晛
Transcriptions
Standard Mandarin
- Hanyu Pinyin: Lǐ Xiàn

Last Emperor of Western Xia (died 1227), personal name Li Xian (Chinese: 李晛), was the tenth and last emperor of the Western Xia dynasty of China, ruling from 1226 to 1227. His reign ended with the collapse of the Western Xia as forces of the Mongol Empire under Genghis Khan overran and conquered it following the defiance of earlier emperors.

The Mongols gave Li Xian the name Shidurghu (Mongolian:ᠱᠢᠳᠤᠷᠭᠤ, Chinese: 失都兒忽), meaning "simple, right, just", and in 18th century European sources he is referred to as Schidascou or Shidaskû from his Mongolian name.

== Reign ==
He was a nephew of his predecessor Emperor Xianzong. Faced with the threat of the Mongols, Li Xian and his officials rallied around the capital Zhongxing, trying to use its large walls to hold off the Mongol cavalries. However, Zhongxing suffered from a massive earthquake, which resulted in pestilence and food shortage. In 1227, Li finally surrendered to the Mongol Empire. In August 1227, the Mongols killed Li Xian and his entire family out of fear that the Western Xia would rebel again over the death of Genghis Khan. His death marked the end of the Western Xia dynasty.

After the fall of the Western Xia, the Mongol army discussed the massacre of the city, but finally, under the strong advice of the Mongol general Tsa Han (Chinese: 察罕), a Tangut, the people of Zhongxing were prevented from being massacred, and Tsa Han then went into the city to pacify the people and soldiers therein, so that the people left behind by the Western Xia could be preserved.
