= Xingqing Prefecture =

Prefecture in imperial China

- Traditional Chinese: 興慶府
- Simplified Chinese: 兴庆府
Transcriptions
Standard Mandarin
- Hanyu Pinyin: Xīngqìng Fǔ

Zhongxing Prefecture
- Traditional Chinese: 中興府
- Simplified Chinese: 中兴府
Transcriptions
Standard Mandarin
- Hanyu Pinyin: Zhōngxīng Fǔ

Xing Prefecture
- Traditional Chinese: 興州
- Simplified Chinese: 兴州
Transcriptions
Standard Mandarin
- Hanyu Pinyin: Xīng Zhōu

Xingqing Prefecture, also known as Irqai, Äriqaya and Egrigaia in Tangut, Secret History of the Mongols and The Travels of Marco Polo respectively, was the capital of Western Xia (Tangut Empire) between the 11th and 13th centuries and its de facto independent precursor Dingnan Jiedushi, in modern Ningxia, China, centering on modern Yinchuan.

After the fall of the Tangut Empire, it was absorbed into imperial China. The Mongol leader and conqueror Genghis Khan, who founded the Mongol Empire, died there on 25 August 1227.

Xingqing was its name between 1033 and 1205. Between 1205 and 1288, it was known as Zhongxing Prefecture (Chinese: 中興府; pinyin: Zhōngxīngfǔ; Tangut: 𗤛𗼵𗥑) and between 1020 and 1033 as Xing Prefecture (興州; Xīngzhōu; Tangut: 𗼵𗉔).

The modern urban district Xingqing District in Yinchuan retains its name.

== See also ==
- Khara-Khoto
