= Emperor Shenzong of Western Xia =

Emperor of Western Xia from 1211 to 1223

Emperor Shenzong of Western Xia 西夏神宗

Emperor of the Western Xia dynasty
- Reign: 1211–1223
- Predecessor: Emperor Xiangzong
- Successor: Emperor Xianzong

Retired Emperor of the Western Xia dynasty
- Reign: 1223–1226
- Born: 1163
- Died: 1226 (aged 62–63)
- Burial: Unknown, possibly the No. 161 attendant tomb of Western Xia mausoleums
Names
- Weiming Zunxu (嵬名遵頊); Li Zunxu (李遵頊)
Era name and dates
- Guangding (光定, 𗪚𗏴): 1211–1223
Posthumous name
- Emperor Yingwen (英文皇帝)
Temple name
- Shenzong (神宗)

Emperor Shenzong of Western Xia (1163–1226), born Li Zunxu (Chinese: 李遵頊), was the eighth emperor of the Tangut-led Chinese Western Xia dynasty. He ruled from 1211 to 1223.

== Reign ==
Shenzong took power after a coup d'état and continued Xiangzong's policy of invading Jin Empire. He started many campaigns against Jin before the Jin Emperor counterattacked, killing many Western Xia soldiers. However, Shenzong continued to attack Jin despite the poor economy, causing high discontent among his people complaining of high taxes. He did not listen to those who advised peace with Jin Empire, and Western Xia sped up its decline. He passed power onto his son Lǐ Déwàng in 1223, and died in 1226.

== Family ==
Father: Prince Zhongwu of Qi (齊國忠武王)

Issue

1. Emperor Xianzong of Western Xia Dewang (西夏襄宗 德旺)
2. Prince of Qingping commandery (清平郡王)
