= 1187 =

1187 in various calendars
- Gregorian calendar: 1187; MCLXXXVII
- Ab urbe condita: 1940
- Armenian calendar: 636; ԹՎ ՈԼԶ
- Assyrian calendar: 5937
- Balinese saka calendar: 1108–1109
- Bengali calendar: 593–594
- Berber calendar: 2137
- English Regnal year: 33 Hen. 2 – 34 Hen. 2
- Buddhist calendar: 1731
- Burmese calendar: 549
- Byzantine calendar: 6695–6696
- Chinese calendar: 丙午年 (Fire Horse); 3884 or 3677 — to — 丁未年 (Fire Goat); 3885 or 3678
- Coptic calendar: 903–904
- Discordian calendar: 2353
- Ethiopian calendar: 1179–1180
- Hebrew calendar: 4947–4948
- Hindu calendars
- Vikram Samvat: 1243–1244
- Shaka Samvat: 1108–1109
- Kali Yuga: 4287–4288
- Holocene calendar: 11187
- Igbo calendar: 187–188
- Iranian calendar: 565–566
- Islamic calendar: 582–583
- Japanese calendar: Bunji 3 (文治３年)
- Javanese calendar: 1094–1095
- Julian calendar: 1187; MCLXXXVII
- Korean calendar: 3520
- Minguo calendar: 725 before ROC 民前725年
- Nanakshahi calendar: −281
- Seleucid era: 1498/1499 AG
- Thai solar calendar: 1729–1730
- Tibetan calendar: མེ་ཕོ་རྟ་ལོ་ (male Fire-Horse); 1313 or 932 or 160 — to — མེ་མོ་ལུག་ལོ་ (female Fire-Sheep); 1314 or 933 or 161

Year 1187 (MCLXXXVII) was a common year starting on Thursday of the Julian calendar.

== Events ==
=== By place ===
==== Byzantine Empire ====
- Spring – Emperor Isaac II (Angelos) sends a Byzantine expeditionary force under Alexios Branas to suppress the Vlach-Bulgarian Rebellion – but Alexios revolts against Isaac and is proclaimed emperor in Andrianople. He musters troops and advances on Constantinople in an attempt to seize it. However, Alexios is unable to bypass the city defenses and is defeated by the imperial forces led by Conrad of Montferrat, the emperor's brother-in-law. On the battlefield, Alexios is beheaded by Conrad's supporting footsoldiers and the rebel army flees the field.
- Siege of Lovech: Byzantine forces under Isaac II besiege the fortress city of Lovech in north-central Bulgaria. After a three-month siege, Isaac is forced to accept a truce by recognizing the joint-rule of Peter II and Ivan Asen I as emperor's (or tsar) over the territory, leading to the creation of the Second Bulgarian Empire (until 1396).

==== Levant ====
- Spring – The Crusaders under Raynald of Châtillon attack a large Muslim caravan, including members of Saladin's family, journeying from Cairo. Raynald takes the merchants, and their families with all their possessions to his castle of Kerak. Saladin demands the release of the prisoners and compensation for their losses. This is refused by Raynald, who pays no attention to his order.
- March 13 – Saladin leaves Damascus with his Muslim forces, and sends letters to neighboring countries, asking for volunteers for a forthcoming jihad ("Holy War"). A week later his younger brother Al-Adil, governor of Egypt, leads his forces out of Cairo towards Syria. Meanwhile, Saladin leaves an army under his 18-year-old son Al-Afdal at Busra, to keep watch on the 'Pilgrim road'.
- April – King Guy of Lusignan summons his vassals and marches north to Nazareth, to reduce Galilee to submission.
- April 29 – A delegation under Balian of Ibelin is sent to Tiberias, to reconcile with Raymond III, prince of Galilee. After Easter, a second delegation (supported by the Knights Templar and Knights Hospitaller) is sent to Tripoli, but the situation remains unchanged.
- May 1 – Battle of Cresson: A Muslim reconnaissance force (some 7,000 men) under Muzaffar al-Din Gökböri, defeats a small Crusader army near Nazareth. Only Gerard de Ridefort, commander of the Crusaders, and a handful of knights escape death or capture. The Muslims scatter and kill the Christian foot-soldiers (some 400 men) before pillaging the countryside.
- June 26 – Saladin regroups his Muslim forces and marches towards the Jordan River. His army numbers around 30,000 men and is divided into three columns. The following day Saladin encamps on the Golan Heights, in a marshy area near Lake Tiberias. Raiding parties are sent across the Jordan to ravage Christian territory between Nazareth, Tiberias, and Mount Tabor.
- June 30 – Saladin sends a contingent to block Tiberias and challenges the Crusaders by moving his main camp closer to Saffuriya – some 10 km west of Lake Tiberias. On July 1, he sends scouts to monitor an alternative road on his northern flank that connects Saffuriya and Tiberias. The following day he attacks Tiberias with a part of his forces, including siege equipment.
- July 2–3 – Saladin besieges Tiberias. The defenders, and Countess Eschiva II (wife of Raymond III) retreat to the citadel and sends messengers urging Guy of Lusignan to send help. Meanwhile, Guy and Raymond hold a war council to debate what should be done. Persuaded by Gerard de Ridefort and Raynald of Châtillon, Guy orders to march to the rescue of Tiberias.

==== Egypt ====
- July 4 – Battle of Hattin: Egyptian army under Saladin defeats the Crusader army (some 20,000 men) under Guy of Lusignan at the Horns of Hattin. Guy is captured along with many nobles and knights, among them, Raynald of Châtillon. The latter is executed by Saladin himself. The Crusader states have no reserves to defend the castles and fortified settlements against Saladin's forces.
- July 14 – Conrad of Montferrat, an Italian nobleman, arrives in Tyre which ends the surrender negotiations with Saladin. He finds the remnants of the Crusader army (after the battle of Hattin) and makes the Tyrians swear loyalty to him. Reginald of Sidon and several other nobles give their support, Reginald goes to refortify his own castle of Beaufort on the Litani River.
- Summer – Egyptian troops led by Saladin begins a campaign that paves the way for further Muslim inroads into Christian territory. Al-Adil invades Palestine with the Egyptian army, and captures the strategic castle of Mirabel (Majdal Yaba). By mid-September, Saladin has captured the cities of Acre, Jaffa, Gaza and Ascalon (blockaded by the Egyptian fleet), along with some 50 Crusader castles.
- September 20–October 2 – Siege of Jerusalem: Egyptian army under Saladin captures Jerusalem, after the Crusaders led by Balian of Ibelin surrender the 'Holy City'. The take-over of the city is relatively peaceful; Saladin agrees to let the Muslims and Christians leave the city, taking with them their goods. Balian joins his wife Maria Komnene and family, in the County of Tripoli.

==== Europe ====
- Summer – Pillage of Sigtuna: A fleet of Karelians enters Lake Malar and ravages the coast. The marauders burn Sigtuna and kill Archbishop Johannes at Almarestäket in Sweden.
- Genoa takes Bonifacio (in Corsica) from Pisa. Pope Gregory VIII reconciles the differences between the states so that both may be used to expedite shipments to the Holy Land.

==== Britain ====
- November – Richard of Poitou, son of King Henry II, take the Cross to help capture Jerusalem from the Muslims. He empties his coffers for the mission and makes a deal with King William the Lion of Scotland, giving him full feudal autonomy in return for cash.

==== Africa ====
- Almohad forces under Caliph Abu Yusuf Yaqub al-Mansur reconquer the city of Gabès (modern Tunisia) from the Almoravid pretender, Ali Banu Ghaniya.

==== Asia ====
- November 9 – Retired-Emperor Gao Zong dies at the age of 80, having abdicated 58 years ago (see 1129) after a reign in which he reestablished the Southern Song dynasty (until 1279).

=== By topic ===
==== Economy ====
- Orio Mastropiero, doge of Venice, secures loans from the Venetian nobility to finance the siege of Zadar. Pledging the income from the Salt Office becomes a staple of the city's finance.

==== Religion ====
- October 20 – Pope Urban III dies after a 2½-year pontificate at Ferrara. He is succeeded by Gregory VIII as the 173rd pope of the Catholic Church.
- October – Josias, archbishop of Tyre, arrives in Rome and informs the Papal Court of the disaster of the Christian slaughter at Hattin by Saladin.
- October 29 – Gregory VIII issues the bull Audita tremendi, proposing the Third Crusade and negotiates with Emperor Frederick I (Barbarossa).
- December 17 – Gregory VIII dies after holding the papacy for only 57 days. He is succeeded by Clement III as the 174th pope of Rome.

== Births ==
- February 23 – Peter I (Pedro), count of Urgell (d. 1258)
- March 29 – Arthur I (or Arzhur), duke of Brittany (d. 1203)
- July 29 – Ibn Abi'l-Dam, Syrian historian and judge (d. 1244)
- September 5 – Louis VIII (the Lion), French king (d. 1226)
- Ela of Salisbury, 3rd countess of Salisbury (d. 1261)
- Gundisalvus of Amarante, Portuguese priest (d. 1259)
- Hassan III, ruler of the Nizari Ismaili state (d. 1221)
- Ibn 'Adlan, Ayyubid cryptologist and poet (d. 1268)
- Koga Michiteru, Japanese nobleman and poet (d. 1248)
- Liu Kezhuang, Chinese poet and literary critic (d. 1269)
- Peter I (Mauclerc), duke and regent of Brittany (d. 1250)
- Vladimir IV (Rurikovich), Kievan Grand Prince (d. 1239)

== Deaths ==
- February 18 – Gilbert Foliot, bishop of London (b. 1110)
- March 18 – Bogusław I, duke of Pomerania (b. 1130)
- May 1 – Roger de Moulins, French Grand Master
- May 6 – Ruben III (or Roupen), Armenian ruler (b. 1145)
- July 4 – Raynald of Châtillon, prince of Antioch (b. 1125)
- October 1 – Yaroslav Osmomysl, Galician prince (b. 1135)
- October 20 – Urban III, pope of the Catholic Church (b. 1120)
- November 9 – Gao Zong, Chinese emperor (b. 1107)
- November 10 – Guðrøðr Óláfsson, Norse king of Dublin
- November 30 – Fujiwara no Hidehira, Japanese nobleman
- December 17 – Gregory VIII, pope of the Catholic Church
- Abu-l-Hasan Ali ibn Ruburtayr, Catalan mercenary general
- Alexios Branas, Byzantine nobleman and usurper
- Clarembald of Arras, French theologian and writer
- Gerard of Cremona, Italian translator and writer (b. 1114)
- Guecellone II, Italian nobleman (House of Da Camino)
- Raymond III, crusader and count of Tripoli (b. 1140)
- Robert of St. Albans, English nobleman and knight
- Rodrigo Álvarez, Galician nobleman and crusader
