= Concannon =

Concannon (other spellings Concanen, Concanon, Conceanainn, Con Ceanainn, and Kincannon, among others) is an Irish family name. According to historian C. Thomas Cairney, the O'Concannons were a chiefly family of the Uí Mháine tribe who in turn were from the Dumnonii or Laigin who were the third wave of Celts to settle in Ireland during the first century BC.

Notable people with the surname include:

- Brian Concannon (born 1963), human rights lawyer and foreign policy advocate
- Brian Concannon (hurler) (born 1997), Irish hurler
- Don Concannon (1930–2003), British politician
- Don O. Concannon (1927–2013), American attorney and politician in Kansas
- Eóin Concannon (died 1954), king of the Claddagh
- Helena Concannon (née Walsh; 1878–1952), politician, historian, author and scholar
- James Concannon (1890–1973), Australian politician
- John Concannon, Irish businessman
- Paddy Concannon (1918–2012), president of the ITCCA
- Susan Concannon (born 1958), American politician

== Other spellings ==
- Muirgeas ua Cú Ceanainn (died 1037), king of Uí Díarmata and chief of the name
- Richard Luke Concanen (1747–1810), first bishop of New York, 1808–1810
- Tomás Bán Ó Conceanainn (1870–1946), writer and historian

== See also ==
- Irish clans
- Concannon Vineyard, a winery in Livermore Valley, California
- Kincannon, a surname and variant of Concannon
- Uí Díarmata
