= Ó Cuindlis =

Ó Cuindlis was the name of an Irish family of brehons and scholars from Uí Maine, located in present-day County Galway and County Roscommon, in Connacht. It means 'Descendant of Cuindleas' (a given name of uncertain meaning). It was also spelt with Cuindilis and Cuindleas, later Cuinnlis and Coinlis, and in County Mayo Coinleisc and Coinlisc. The earliest form of the name can be traced back to an abbot from the 8th century, named Cuindles.

== Naming conventions ==
Anglicized variations of the surname include Candless, Conlish, Conlisk, Conliske, Coynliske, Cundlish, Cunlish, Cunlisk, Quinless, Quinlish, Quinlisk, and Quinlist. Ó Cuindlis is etymologically related to McCandless and McCandlish, from Mac Cuindlis, 'Son of Cuindleas'.

Male	Daughter	Wife (Long)	Wife (Short)
Ó Cuindlis	Ní Cuindlis	Bean Uí Cuindlis	Uí Cuindlis

== Notable individuals ==
- Domnall Ó Cuindlis, (d. 1342), historian
- Murchadh Ó Cuindlis (fl. 1398–1411; also spelled Ó Cuinnlis), a scribe of the Book of Lecan and An Leabhar Breac
- Cornelius Ó Cuinnlis (also spelled Ó Cunlis or O'Cunlis; fl. 1444–1469), a Catholic bishop of Emly and later of Clonfert

== See also ==
- McCandless (surname)
- McCandlish
- Candlish
