= Ó Comáin =

Irish surname

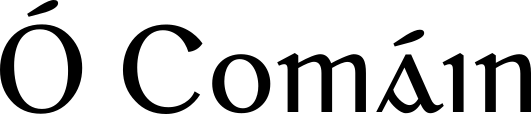
- Ó Comáin in a Gaelic type.
- Language: Irish

Origin
- Derivation: Kings of Déisi Munster; Kings of Uí Díarmata; Saint Commán of Roscommon; Saint Coman of Kinvara
- Meaning: "noble"
- Region of origin: Connaught, Munster, Clare

Ó Comáin is Irish language surname. Its anglicised forms include Comain(e), Coman, Comeens, Comin(s), Commane, Comman(s), Commin(s), Common(s), Commyn, Comyn(e), Cowman(s), Cummane, Cumings, Cummin(s), Cumming(s), Cumyn, Cummyn, Kimmons, MacSkimmins, McCowman.

The name is derived from the Gaelic personal name Comán (meaning "noble" or "steadfast") or Commán ("companion" or "communion"), a name from early Irish history. It is sometimes mistranslated as Hurley due to the superficial resemblance between the unrelated Gaelic words comán and camán, the latter referring to a hurling stick.

The surname is especially associated with the provinces of Connacht (sept: Ó Cuimín) and Munster (sept: Ó Comáin). Roscommon was founded by a saint, Common. A chiefdom, Tulach Commáin, existed in County Clare in the 8th and 9th centuries. The primary settlement was Cahercommaun, ("The Dwelling of Commaun/Commane") (Note: Also called Cahercommane and Cathair Chomáin - Irish spellings and names may use various spellings.) also in Clare.

== Chiefdom of Tulach Commáin ==
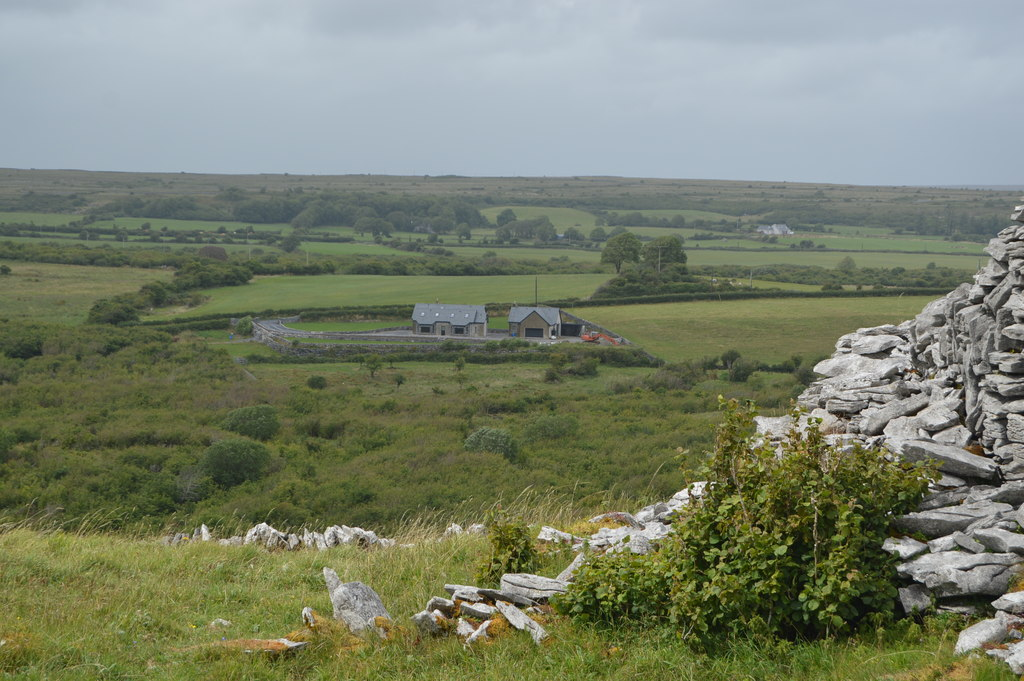
View from Cahercommane, centre of the Chiefdom of Commane

Tulach Commáin was a small Irish chiefdom, coexisting with the larger and more ancient chiefdom of the Corcu Mruad. It likely emerged from the disintegration of this larger polity, possibly forming part of the Dál Cais and Thomond's chiefdom confederacies. The chiefdom's primary settlement, Cahercommaun (Cathair Commáin or "Commane's Residence"), served as the political and ceremonial centre of Tulach Commáin in the 8th and 9th centuries.

In the Gaelic nobility of Ireland, Tulach Commáin likely functioned as an autonomous túath or as part of a larger composite chiefdom. It served as a hub of political, social, and religious activity, with its elaborate structures and associated monastic sites indicating its importance as a regional power.

=== The identity and origins of Tulach Commáin ===
In the Anals of Innisfallen, the death of Colman mac Comáin on one of the Aran islands is recorded in 751 A.D, according to Gibson, likely son or descendent of Comáin chief of Tulach Commáin.

A possible brother is mentioned in the Anals of Innisfallen and Annals of Ulster, the demise of Célechair mac Commáin (son of Commáin) is recorded in the Battle of Corcmodruadh in either 704 or 705 A.D. Gibson identifies him as of the Eóganacht Uí Cormaic, a branch of the prominent Eóganacht dynasty. Gibson's work draws on references such as O'Brien's Corpus Genealogiarum Hiberniae and Byrne's Irish Kings and High-Kings, which outline the genealogical framework of the Eóganacht. According to Frost, the Uí Cormaic settled in what is now the Islands Barony, possibly on the territory of the Corcu Baiscinn, located directly east of Tulach Commáin. Gibson suggests that Cahercommane, associated with Tulach Commáin, may have been the centre of a short-lived Eóganacht chiefdom, or part of the larger mór túath (over-kingdom) of the Corcu Mruad.

=== Loss of ancestral lands ===
In the 13th century the clan was dispossessed of their lands, following the Anglo-Norman invasion, by the "De Burgos" (Burke) invaders.

== Notable figures ==
Several historical and ecclesiastical figures may be associated with the name and variants:

- Giolla Comáin mac Néill (died 991) was 2nd King of Uí Díarmata.
- Colmán mac Comán: (8th-century) one of the four sages of Ireland, the second abbot listed in the Irish annals.
- Gilla Cómáin mac Gilla Samthainde: (11th-century) a medieval Irish poet.
