= McCandless =

McCandless may refer to:

== People ==
- McCandless (surname)

== Places ==
- McCandless, Pennsylvania, US, a home-rule municipality of 29,000 people
- McCandless Archeological Site, near Elkton, Maryland, US

== Other uses ==
- The McCandless method for stage lighting, authored by Stanley McCandless
- USS McCandless (FF-1084), a US Navy frigate named for Byron McCandless and Bruce McCandless I
- McCandless Lunar Lander, named for Bruce McCandless II

== See also ==
- McCandlish, a less common form of the name
- McCanles Gang (sometimes also rendered McCandless), an alleged outlaw gang in the American West of the early 1860s
- "Mac" McCandless, antagonist (played by Anthony Hopkins) in the film Freejack
- McCandles, protagonist family in the 1971 western film Big Jake
- McCanles, protagonist family in the 1946 western film Duel in the Sun and the Niven Busch novel on which it was based
