= Domnall Ó Cuindlis =

Irish historian

Domnall Ó Cuindlis (also rendered Domhnall Ó Coinleisc; died 1342) was an Irish historian of the Ó Cuindlis family of brehons and scholars.

Ó Cuindlis is described in the Annals of Lough Ce as "an eminent historian". In 1342, in unknown circumstances, he "was killed by the Uí Díarmata". The latter was the dynastic name of the family of Ó Con Ceanainn (anglicised as Concannon), who ruled a district called Uí Díarmata in what is now north-east County Galway.

== See also ==
- Murchadh Ó Cuindlis (fl. 1398-1411), a scribe of the Book of Lecan and An Leabhar Breac
