= McCandless (surname) =

Surname from north Ireland and sometimes south-west Scotland

McCandless, MacCandless
- Pronunciation: /mɪkˈkænd.ləs/
- Language: Irish and Scottish Gaelic

Origin
- Meaning: 'Son of Cuindleas'
- Region of origin: Ireland (north), Scotland (south-west)

Other names
- Variant forms: McCandlis, McCanlis, McAndless, McAnliss, McCandlass, McCandliss, McCanliss, McAndles, and many others

McCandless (/mɪkˈkænd.ləs/, mik-CAND-ləs) is a Gaelic surname, both Irish (Ulster) and occasionally Scottish. It is the Anglicized form of the Middle Irish Mac Cuindlis (among other spellings) 'son of Cuindleas', an Old Irish given name of uncertain meaning.

== Distribution and variants ==
In historical census and other data, the name is mostly confined to the province of Ulster, especially County Donegal in the Republic of Ireland, and counties Antrim, Down, and Londonderry in Northern Ireland. Some variants include McCandlis, McCanlis, McAndless, McAnliss, McCandlass, McCandliss, McCanliss, and McAndles, among others. Spellings with Mac were believed to be extinct by the first half of the 20th century, but still survive among a few families, primarily in Canada. As with other names of this sort, versions with M' were also attested until the early 20th century.

The name is closely related to McCandlish, from the same derivation but primarily found in Scotland. Some other recorded Scottish variants are more similar to McCandless, e.g. McCanleis and McCaunles, and some in the north of Ireland closer to McCandlish, e.g. McCandleish. McCandless itself is also thinly attested in Scotland.

The name is etymologically but probably not familially related to the Ó Cuindlis ('descendant of Cuindleas'), a literary family of Uí Mháine in west-central Ireland. The earliest form of the given name can be traced back to an abbot from the 8th century called Cuindles.

== Notable McCandlesses ==
- Al McCandless (1927–2017), US Congressman
- Billy McCandless (1894–1955), Irish football player and manager
- Bruce McCandless (1911–1968), US Navy rear admiral, and Medal of Honor recipient
- Bruce McCandless II (1937–2017), astronaut who made the first untethered spacewalk
- Byron McCandless (1881–1967), commodore in the US Navy; vexillologist
- Chris McCandless (1968–1992), American hiker and itinerant traveler; the subject of Into the Wild (1996)
- Cromie McCandless (1921–1992), Northern Irish motorcycle road racer; brother of Rex
- Ezra McCandless (born Monica Kay, 1998), an American who was convicted of the murder of Alex Woodworth
- Jack McCandless (1892–1940), Irish football player and manager
- Lincoln Loy McCandless (1859–1940), American politician, cattle rancher, industrialist from Hawaii
- Paul McCandless (born 1947), American jazz woodwind player and composer
- Ray B. McCandless (1889–1931), American college sports coach
- Rex McCandless (1915–1992), Northern Irish motorcycle road racer, designer of the Norton Featherbed motorcycle frame; brother of Cromie
- Scott Cook "Jack" McCandless (1891–1961), Major League Baseball player
- Stanley McCandless (1897–1967), considered to be the first theatrical lighting educator
- William McCandless (1834–1884), Union Army officer in the American Civil War, and later member of the Pennsylvania State Senate
- Wilson McCandless (1810–1882), US federal judge from Pennsylvania

== See also ==
- McCandless
- McCandlish
- McCandless Gang
- Ó Cuindlis
