= Tomás Ó Con Cheanainn =

Irish historian and university teacher (1921–2015)

Tomás Ó Con Cheanainn (9 March 1921 – 13 June 2015) was an Irish scholar, historian, and professor.

A native of Baile an tSagairt, Cois Fhairrge, County Galway, Ó Con Cheanainn won a scholarship in 1940 to University College Galway, studying for a BA in Irish and Classics. His MA thesis concerned a hagiographical text in the Leabhar Breac - the early 15th-century codex was later a subject of "a major palaeographical study, which marked the commencement of a virtual reinvention, wrought single-handedly in his lifetime, of scholarly knowledge concerning the culture and traditions of Connacht."

According to his obituary in The Irish Times:

"Tomás had an unrivalled knowledge of the literary and historical content of Irish manuscripts, medieval and modern. But he was also a palaeographical “natural”, possessed of a wonderfully keen eye for the salient features of a scribal hand. Long before digital imagery and databases, he showed a capacity to recall and associate such features in manuscripts from different collections, and to fix an identity previously unrecognised. He mastered the art of describing styles of handwriting with clarity and exactness, regardless of whether he was writing in English or, as he did almost exclusively in later years, in Irish."

Ó Con Cheanainn from 1969 to until he retired in 1986, was Professor of Classical and Modern Irish. From 1975 to 1986 he edited Éigse: A Journal of Irish Studies, and was a member of the Royal Irish Academy. The last of his many articles, written when age 90, concerned his dynastic ancestors, the Uí Díarmata, and the process by which its ruling sept adopted the surname Ua Con Cheanainn.

== See also ==
- Kings of Uí Díarmata
- Tomás Bán Ó Conceanainn (1870 – 1946), writer and historian.
- Eóin Concannon (died 1954), last actual King of the Claddagh
