= Tadhg of Uí Díarmata =

First recorded king of Ui Diarmata, died 971

Tadhg mac Muircheartach was the first recorded king of Uí Díarmata, a local kingdom located in what is now north County Galway, Ireland, who died in 971.

== Background ==
Tadhg mac Muircheartach was a member of the Síl Muiredaig dynasty, who ruled as kings of The Connachta in what is now central County Roscommon. By the mid 10th century they had expanded south-west into the north-east of County Galway. Here a branch of the kindred seized territory and renamed it Uí Díarmata, after its founder, Diarmada Finn mac Tomaltaig, who was in turn a great-grandson of King Indrechtach mac Muiredaig (died 723).

== Death and successors ==
Murchad Glun re Lar mac Flaithbertaigh, King of Ailech and King Cathal mac Tadg of Connacht fought each other at Ceis Corran in 971. Cathal was defeated and killed, along with many of his allies including: Geibheannach, son of Aedh, lord of Ui-Maine; Tadhg, son of Muircheartach, chief of Ui-Diarmada; Murchadh, son of Flann, son of Glethneachan, chief of Clann-Murchadha; and Seirridh Ua Flaithbheartaigh, with a countless number along with them: and Murchadh totally plundered Connaught afterwards.

His son, Concenaind mac Tadhg, though never apparently king himself, would give his name to the ruling dynasty of Uí Díarmata, Ó Cú Ceanain (anglicised "Concannon")

== The Concanon pedigree ==
- Muiredach Muillethan, died 702, father of
- Indrechtach mac Muiredaig, died 723, father of
- Murgaile mac Indrachtaig, father of
- Tomaltaig mac Murgaile.father of
- Diarmada Finn mac Tomaltaig, father of
- Dadlaich mac Diarmada Finn, father of
- Ailill mac Dadlaich, father of
- Muircertaig mac Ailill, father of
- Tadhg mac Muircertaig, died 971, father of
- Cú Ceanain mac Tadhg, died 991, father of
- Uata mac Concenaind, died 1021, father of
- Tadhg mac Uata, father of
- Muircertaig Mir mac Tadhg, father of
- Mailechlainn mac Muircertaig, father of
- Cathal mac Mailechlainn, father of
- Aedh mac Cathail, father of
- Tadhg mac Aedh, father of
- Ardgal mac Tadhg, fl. mid 12th century?

Regnal titles
Unknown	King of Uí Díarmata unknown-971	Succeeded by Gillacommain mac Niall
