= Teige Ua Con Ceannainn =

Teige Ua Con Ceannainn (nó Tadhg; fl. 1152) was an apparent King of Uí Díarmata.

== Overview ==
The succession to the kingship of Ui Diarmata after the death of Aedh Ua Con Ceannainn in 1119, to the death of Cú Ceanain Ó Con Ceanainn in 1224, is unclear. Teige is only mentioned retrospectively, in the obituary of his foster-son, King Cathal Crobhdearg Ua Conchobair of Connacht, sub anno 1224:

== Annalistic reference ==
"A heavy and terrible shower fell in part of Connacht this year, that is, in Tir Maine and in Sodain and in Ui Diarmata and in Clann Taidc, which brought about disease and very great sickness among the cows and beasts of those regions after they had eaten grass and leaves; and when men drank of the milk of these cattle and ate of their flesh, they suffered internal pains and various diseases. Nor was it strange that these portentous things should happen in Connacht at that time, for a great affliction befell the country then, the loss of Cathal Crobderg son of Toirrdelbach O Conchobair, king of Connacht; the king most feared and dreaded on every hand in Ireland; the king who carried out most plunderings and burnings against Galls and Gaels who opposed him; the king who was the fiercest and harshest towards his enemies that ever lived; the king who most blinded, killed and mutilated rebellious and disaffected subjects; the king who best established peace and tranquility of all the kings of Ireland; the king who built most monasteries and houses for religious communities; the king who most comforted clerks and poor men with food and fire on the floor of his own habitation; the king whom of all the kings in Ireland God made most perfect in every good quality; the king on whom God most bestowed fruit and increase and crops; the king who was most chaste of all the kings of Ireland; the king who kept himself to one consort and practised continence before God from her death till his own; the king whose wealth was partaken by laymen and clerics, infirm men, women and helpless folk, as had been prophesied in the writings and the visions of saints and righteous men of old; the king who suffered most mischances in his reign, but God raised him up from each in turn; the king who with manly valour and by the strength of his hand preserved his kingship and rule. And it is in the time of this king that tithes were first levied for God in Ireland. This righteous and upright king, this prudent, pious, just champion, died in the robe of a Grey Monk, after a victory over the world and the devil, in the monastery of Knockmoy, which with the land belonging to it he had himself offered to God and the monks, on the twenty-seventh day of May as regards the solar month and on a Monday as regards the week-day, and was nobly and honourably buried, having been for six and thirty years sole monarch of the province of Connacht. So says Donnchad Baccach O Maelchonaire in his poem on the Succession of the Kings: ‘The reign of Red-hand was a pleasant reign, after the fall of Cathal Carrach; he ruled for sixteen and twenty prosperous calm years.’ And he was in the seventy-second year of his age, as the poet Nede O Maelchonaire says: ‘Three years and a half-year, I say, was the life of Red-hand in Cruachu till the time that his father died in wide-stretching Ireland.’ He was born at Port Locha Mesca and fostered by Tadc O Con Chennainn in Ui Diarmata, and it was sixty-eight years from the death of Toirrdelbach to the death of Cathal Crobderg," as the chronicle shows.

However this does not specifically name Teige as ruler of Ui Diarmata.

Preceded by Aedh Ua Con Ceannainn	King of Uí Díarmata ?–?	Succeeded by Uada Ua Con Ceanainn
