= Mac Cú Ceanain =

Mac Cú Ceanain (died 1021) was King of Uí Díarmata.

== Biography ==
A son of Cú Ceanain mac Tadhg, first name unknown, is noted as king of Uí Díarmata at his death in 1021. His father, though never king himself, had died fighting against the then king in a succession war in 991. From the reign of his son, became the ancestor of all subsequent kings, and the dynasty took their surname, O Concannon, from him.

The Annals of the Four Masters report his death: The son of Cuceanann, lord of Ui-Diarmada, was slain by the Ui-Gadhra (see Kings of Sliabh Lugha).

Preceded by Muirgheas mac Aedh	King of Uí Díarmata; 999?–1021	Succeeded by Muirgeas ua Cú Ceanainn
