= Uada Ua Con Ceanainn =

Uada Ua Con Ceanainn (died 1167) was King of Uí Díarmata.

== Biography ==
Uada was the son of Muirgheas Ua Cú Ceannainn, who appears to be identical with the man of that name who died in 1105.

Dubhaltach Mac Fhirbhisigh records of him

"Uada son of Muirgheas took the full kingship of Uí Díarmata and he was a man of great fame in terms of honour, dexterity and appearance. He launched many attacks and assaults and did many actions in his own territory that we have not recounted and that have not been revised here afterwards for the sake of brevity."

His successor is not known for certain. The next recorded king was Cú Ceanain Ó Con Ceanainn, who died in 1224, but his relationship to Uada is uncertain.

Mac Fhirbhisigh gives the pedigree of his descendant, Domhnallán Ó Con Ceanainn as follows, tracing him back to Uada.

"Domhnallán son of Cionaoth son of Artghal son of Cathal son of Muireadhach son of Fearghus son of Raghallach son of Uda."

Uda was a contemporary, and subject of, King of Connacht Ruaidrí Ua Conchobair, who was also High-King of Ireland.

Preceded by Teige Ua Con Ceannainn	King of Uí Díarmata ?-1167	Succeeded by Cú Ceanain Ó Con Ceanainn
