= 1067 =

1067 in various calendars
- Gregorian calendar: 1067; MLXVII
- Ab urbe condita: 1820
- Armenian calendar: 516; ԹՎ ՇԺԶ
- Assyrian calendar: 5817
- Balinese saka calendar: 988–989
- Bengali calendar: 473–474
- Berber calendar: 2017
- English Regnal year: 1 Will. 1 – 2 Will. 1
- Buddhist calendar: 1611
- Burmese calendar: 429
- Byzantine calendar: 6575–6576
- Chinese calendar: 丙午年 (Fire Horse); 3764 or 3557 — to — 丁未年 (Fire Goat); 3765 or 3558
- Coptic calendar: 783–784
- Discordian calendar: 2233
- Ethiopian calendar: 1059–1060
- Hebrew calendar: 4827–4828
- Hindu calendars
- Vikram Samvat: 1123–1124
- Shaka Samvat: 988–989
- Kali Yuga: 4167–4168
- Holocene calendar: 11067
- Igbo calendar: 67–68
- Iranian calendar: 445–446
- Islamic calendar: 459–460
- Japanese calendar: Jiryaku 3 (治暦３年)
- Javanese calendar: 971–972
- Julian calendar: 1067; MLXVII
- Korean calendar: 3400
- Minguo calendar: 845 before ROC 民前845年
- Nanakshahi calendar: −401
- Seleucid era: 1378/1379 AG
- Thai solar calendar: 1609–1610
- Tibetan calendar: མེ་ཕོ་རྟ་ལོ་ (male Fire-Horse); 1193 or 812 or 40 — to — མེ་མོ་ལུག་ལོ་ (female Fire-Sheep); 1194 or 813 or 41

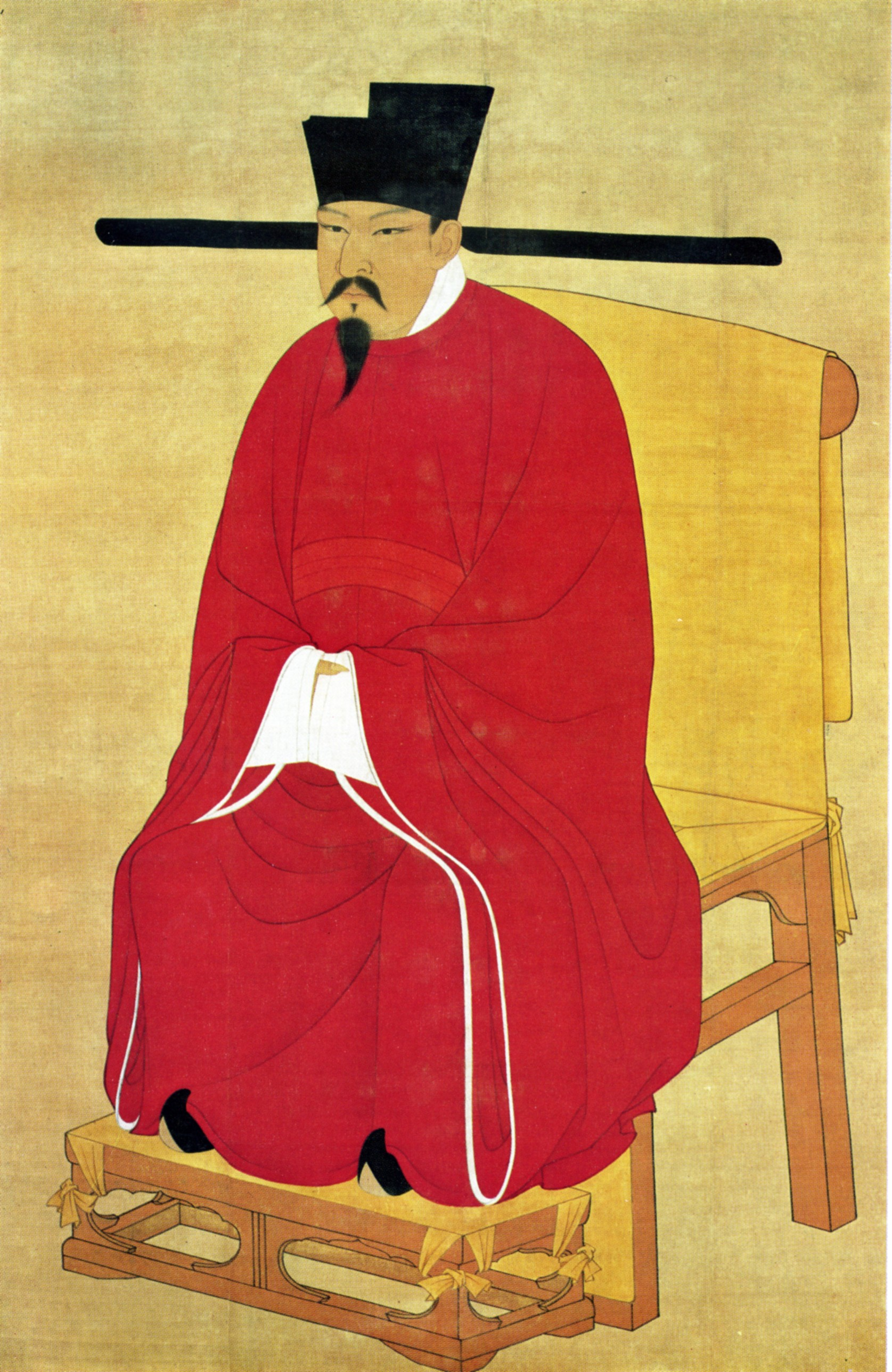
Emperor Shen Zong (1048–1085)

Year 1067 (MLXVII) was a common year starting on Monday of the Julian calendar.

== Events ==
=== By place ===
==== Byzantine Empire ====
- May 22 – Emperor Constantine X dies after a 7-year reign at Constantinople. His wife, Empress Eudocia Macrembolitissa, is crowned Augusta and becomes co-regent for her two sons (Michael VII and Konstantios) along with Constantine's brother John Doukas, who rules as Caesar of the Byzantine Empire.

==== Seljuk Empire ====
- Spring – The Seljuk Turks make incursions into Mesopotamia, Cilicia and Cappadocia. They sack the Byzantine city of Caesarea, move south through the Cilician Gates and raid the region around Antioch in Syria.

==== Europe ====
- March 3 – Battle on the Nemiga River: The three sons of Grand Prince Yaroslav I (the Wise) – Iziaslav I, Sviatoslav II, and Vsevolod I – defeat the forces under Vseslav of Polotsk.
- Eric and Eric, two pretenders to the Swedish throne, are both killed during the struggle for power in Sweden. Halsten, son of the late King Stenkil, becomes the new ruler.
- Olaf III returns to Norway with the remaining troops from the Battle of Stamford Bridge. He is proclaimed king and co-ruler with his older brother Magnus II (Haraldsson).
- Wartburg Castle (near Eisenach) is founded by Louis the Springer, count of Thuringia (modern Germany).
- Minsk and Orsha are first mentioned in the chronicles, making them two of the oldest cities in Belarus.

==== England ====
- Spring – King William I (the Conqueror) returns to Normandy and takes with him Edgar Ætheling (grandson of Edmund Ironside), Archbishop Stigand, and the brothers Morcar and Edwin.
- Odo of Bayeux, a half-brother of William I, is appointed Earl of Kent and becomes William's deputy (or de facto regent) in England. His wealth and land become considerable.
- Eustace II, count of Boulogne, supports the Kentishmen in an attempt to seize Dover Castle. The conspiracy fails, and Eustace is sentenced to forfeit his English fiefs.
- Winter – William I marches on Exeter, which he besieges. The city holds out for 18 days, and after its fall William builds Rougemont Castle there to secure the region.
- Winchester Castle in Hampshire is founded by William I; it is later one of the seats of government of the Norman kings ruling England.

==== China ====
- January 25 – Emperor Yingzong (or Zhao Shu) of the Song dynasty dies after a 4-year reign. He is succeeded by his 18-year-old son Shen Zong as emperor of China.

=== By topic ===
==== Religion ====
- December 6 – A fire, the second in as many years, heavily damages Canterbury Cathedral in England.

== Births ==
- Abu Hafs Umar an-Nasafi, Persian scholar and historian (d. 1142)
- Adela of Normandy, countess of Blois (approximate date)
- Ari Thorgilsson, Icelandic chronicler and writer (d. 1148)
- John Taronites, Byzantine governor (approximate date)

== Deaths ==
- January 25 – Ying Zong, Chinese emperor (b. 1032)
- February 13 – Geoffrey II, French nobleman
- April 17 – Robert de Turlande, French priest
- May 22 – Constantine X, Byzantine emperor (b. 1006)
- July 12 – John Komnenos, Byzantine general
- September 1 – Baldwin V, count of Flanders
- November 27 – Sancha of León, queen of León
- December 2 – Shaykh Tusi, Persian Shia scholar (b. 995)
- Aedh Ua Con Ceanainn, king of Uí Díarmata
- Bahmanyār, Persian philosopher and logician
- Cai Xiang, Chinese calligrapher and poet (b. 1012)
- Elisaveta Yaroslavna of Kiev, Norwegian queen
- Eric and Eric, Swedish throne pretenders
- Gervais de Château-du-Loir, French nobleman (b. 1007)
- Muireadhach Ua Cárthaigh, Irish chief poet
- Richard, French nobleman (House of Normandy)
- Wulfwig (or Wulfinus), bishop of Dorchester
