= Muirgheas mac Aedh =

Muirgheas mac Aedh (died 999) was king of Uí Díarmata until he was killed in 999.

Preceded by Gillacommain mac Niall	King of Uí Díarmata; 991?–999	Succeeded by Mac Cú Ceanain
