= Aedh Ua Con Ceannainn =

Aedh Ua Con Ceannainn (died 1119) was King of Uí Díarmata.

== Overview ==
The Annals of the Four Masters simply state that "Aedh Ua Conceannainn, lord of Ui-Diarmada, died." No contemporary annal gives any more detail, and the precise succession over much of the next century is not clear.

Preceded by Muirgheas Ua Cú Ceannainn	King of Uí Díarmata; 1106?–1119	Succeeded by Teige Ua Con Ceannainn
