= Cathal mac Davok Ó Con Ceanainn =

Cathal mac Davok Ó Con Ceanainn (died 1370) was King of Uí Díarmata.

== Overview ==
Cathal is the only ruler of the territory mentioned after Aodh Ó Con Ceanainn. The Annals of the Four Masters simply list his death without giving any details.

| Preceded by Aodh Ó Con Ceanainn | King of Uí Díarmata ?–1370 | Succeeded by Ó Con Ceanainn |
