= Candlish =

Candlish is a Scottish surname. Notable people with the surname include:

- James Smith Candlish (1835–1892), Scottish minister, son of Robert
- John Candlish (1816–1874), British glass bottle manufacturer and Liberal Party politician
- Louise Candlish, British author
- Robert Smith Candlish (1806–1873), Scottish minister, father of James

== See also ==
- McCandlish, a related surname
