= Tomas Ó Con Ceanainn =

Irish regional king

Tomas Ó Con Ceanainn, Lord of Uí Díarmata, died 1478.

== Overview ==
Sub anno 1478, the Annals of the Four Masters state that

Thomas O'Concannon, Lord of Hy-Diarmada, was slain by the son of his own brother"

He was succeeded by William, who died later the same year.

Preceded by unknown	King of Uí Díarmata ?-1478	Succeeded by William Ó Con Ceanainn
