= William Ó Con Ceanainn =

Irish king

William Ó Con Ceanainn, Lord of Uí Díarmata, died in 1478.

== Overview ==
Sub anno 1478, the Annals of the Four Masters state that

"Thomas O'Concannon, Lord of Hy-Diarmada, was slain by the son of his own brother."

He was succeeded by William, who died later the same year, who was in turn succeeded by his son, Davock.

Preceded by Tomas Ó Con Ceanainn	King of Uí Díarmata; 1478-1478	Succeeded by Davok Ó Con Ceanainn
