= Aodh Ó Con Ceanainn =

Aodh Ó Con Ceanainn, (fl. 1319) was king of Uí Díarmata.

Aodh Ó Con Ceanainn was the apparent successor to Donnell, who died at the Second Battle of Athenry in 1316. Aodh is referenced circa 1319, as king of Ui Diarmata.

Preceded by Donnell Ó Con Ceanainn	King of Uí Díarmata ?-?	Succeeded by Cathal mac Davok Ó Con Ceanainn
