= Davok Ó Con Ceanainn =

Davok Ó Con Ceanainn, Lord of Uí Díarmata, fl. 1478.

== Biography ==
Davock was an Irish Lord. He succeeded his father, William, but was banished into Connemara before the end of the year. His descendants adopted the surname Mac Davock or Mac Davy and are still found in the area. His successor seems to be unknown.

Preceded by William Ó Con Ceanainn	King of Uí Díarmata; 1478-1478	Succeeded by unknown
