= Donnell Ó Con Ceanainn =

Donnell Ó Con Ceanainn (died 1316) was King of Uí Díarmata.

== Overview ==
Cú Ceanain was a contemporary, and subject of, King of Connacht Fedlim Ó Conchobair. He fought with him at the Second Battle of Athenry in 1316, where he was one of the many killed on the Irish side.

Preceded by Cú Ceanain Ó Con Ceanainn	King of Uí Díarmata ?-1316	Succeeded by Aodh Ó Con Ceanainn
