= Cú Ceanain mac Tadhg =

Cú Ceanain mac Tadhg, Prince of Uí Díarmata, ancestor of the Concannon family, died 991

== Background ==
Cú Ceanain mac Tadhg was a member of the Síl Muiredaig dynasty, who ruled as kings of The Connachta in what is now central County Roscommon. By the mid 10th century they had expanded south-west into the north-east of County Galway. Here a branch of the kindred seized territory and renamed it Uí Díarmata, after its founder, Diarmada Finn mac Tomaltaig, who was in turn a great-grandson of King Indrechtach mac Muiredaig (died 723).

== Life and family ==
Cú Ceanain was a son of a previous king, Tadhg mac Muircheartach (died 971) but had not succeeded himself. A war between himself and the then king, Gillacommain mac Niall, brought about both their deaths in 991. An unnamed son of his became king, reigning from around 999 to 1021. All subsequent kings of Uí Díarmata descended from him, while Cú Ceanain's grandson, Muirgeas ua Cú Ceanainn, was the first to adopt the style that subsequently became the dynasty's surname, Concannon.
