= Kincannon =

Kincannon is a surname, being a variant of the Irish surname Concannon. Notable people with the surname include:

- Andrew Armstrong Kincannon (1859–1938), American academic
- C. Louis Kincannon (1940–2012), American statistician
- Harry Kincannon (1909–1965), American baseball player
- Indya Kincannon (born 1971), American politician
- Theodore "Ted" Nieman Kincannon (1896–1936), American aviator
- Todd Kincannon (born 1981), American political activist
