= Murchadh Ó Cuindlis =

Irish scribe

Murchadh Riabhach Ó Cuindlis (fl. 1398–1411) was an Irish scribe of the Ó Cuindlis family of brehons and scholars. Other renderings of his name have Muircheartach or Murchad, and sometimes Ó Cuinnlis.

He was said to be a native of Bally Lough Deacker (today called Ballaghdacker, in Irish Baile Locha Deacair, in the parish of Athleague, which straddles north Galway and south Roscommon). Ó Cuindlis was one of the scribes of the Leabhar Mór Leacáin ('Great Book of Lecan'), c. 1397–1418, under the guidance of Giolla Íosa Mor mac Donnchadh MacFhirbhisigh. He was later the scribe of An Leabhar Breac ('The Speckled Book') at Duniry, 1408–1411; it is the largest Irish-language vellum manuscript attributed to a single scribe. He is also credited with a third work, c. 1400, known as An Leabhar Ruadh Muimhneach ('The Red Book of Munster') or An Leabhar Ruadh ('The Red Book'), a genealogical work from which material was copied in 1621 by Mícheál Ó Cléirigh at Quin Friary, possibly examined in the 1630s by Antonius Bruodinus at the library of Moynoe, and last seen (by Ó Cléirigh again) on 30 June 1634 at a convent in Thomond (County Limerick). It is not to be confused with the much later An Leabhar Muimhneach ('The Book of Munster') or various other manuscripts called Red Book.

== See also ==
- Domnall Ó Cuindlis (d. 1342), Irish historian
