= Commán of Roscommon =

Irish saint

Commán of Roscommon or Coman mac Faelchon (son of Faelchon) was an Irish saint, the founder, abbot and bishop of Roscommon, fl. 550.

== Life ==
He was a member of the Cinel Domaingen, a branch of the Sogain of Connacht. He studied at the monastic school of Clonard in County Meath, where he became associated with Saint Finnian of Clonard. About 550, after completing his education, he founded a monastery on the east bank of the River Suck, at a wood (ros) which was called after him (Ros Comain).

Ros Comain was situated on Magh nAi (later known as the plains of Roscommon/the plains of Boyle), homeland of the Ui Briuin Kings of Connacht. He successfully sought their patronage, ensuring his influence within their spheres of power.

His successors are named in the Irish annals between the years 782 and 1135.

He has been linked with the foundation of Kilcommon in County Mayo and the early monastic church at Leithglin, County Carlow. He composed a rule for monks, which came to be observed by many religious bodies in Connacht.

His feast day is 26 December.

== See also ==
- Coman(s), Comman(s), Commane (Gaelic: O'Comain) Irish surname
