= Aislinge Meic Con Glinne =

Middle Irish parodic text

- by Anonymous
- Original title: Aislinge Meic Con Glinne
- Translator: William Maunsell Hennessy; Rudolf Thurneysen; Kuno Meyer
- Written: c. 1100
- Country: Ireland
- Language: Middle Irish
- Genre(s): Aisling, parody
- Lines: 1,349

"Aislinge Meic Con Glinne" (Middle Irish: "Vision-poem of the son of Conglinne") is a Middle Irish tale of anonymous authorship, generally believed to have been written in the late 11th/early 12th century. A parody of the "Vision" genre of religious text, it has been described as the "best major work of parody" in the Irish language.

== Text ==
The tale exists in two manuscript versions, one (sometimes referred to as B) in the fifteenth century collection Leabhar Breac ("Speckled Book"), and the other (known as H) in a manuscript dating from the sixteenth or seventeenth century. The two versions have significant differences.

== Synopsis ==
The Vision is the story of Aniér MacConglinne, a scholar from Armagh, and his efforts to rid King Cathal mac Finnguine of a "demon of gluttony" that lived in Cathal's throat. One day, MacConglinne decides to abandon scholarship and become a poet, because "[t]o spend his life studying was wretched." He decides to visit Cathal, then travelling around Munster, since he is hungry and has heard that Cathal is well supplied with "whitemeats", i.e. dairy products. MacConglinne packs up and travels across the country in a single night, arriving in Cork in the evening. He stays in a dilapidated guesthouse attached to a monastery, where his singing of psalms disturbs the people of Cork. The monks bring him meagre rations, and MacConglinne composes a satire on them, whereupon he is seized, stripped naked and whipped. The abbot, Manchín, proposes crucifying the unrepentant poet; MacConglinne complains that they have shown him no hospitality whatever and curses them as "curs, robbers and shit-hounds". The monks decide to defer crucifying him until the following day, but that night MacConglinne is visited by an angel of God, and is granted a vision of a land made entirely of food:

The fort we reached was beautiful,
With works of custards thick,
Beyond the loch.
New butter was the bridge in front,
The rubble dyke was wheaten white,
Bacon the palisade.

Stately, pleasantly it sat,
A compact house and strong.
Then I went in:
The door of it was dry meat,
The threshold was bare bread,
cheese-curds the sides.

Smooth pillars of old cheese,
And sappy bacon props
Alternate ranged;
Fine beams of mellow cream,
White rafters - real curds,
Kept up the house.

The next day he tells the monks about it and Manchín says that the vision is the only thing that will cure King Cathal of his gluttony. If MacConglinne will communicate the vision to King Cathal, the monks will not kill him for making satires about them. MacConglinne somewhat sulkily agrees, and duly travels to meet Cathal and his entourage. Cathal is still the helpless victim of his gluttony, and MacConglinne is only able to get the king's attention by grinding his teeth so loudly that "there was no one in the neighbourhood [...] that did not hear the noise". He manages to get Cathal to give him an apple, the first time in three and a half years that the king has offered food to anyone else. MacConglinne provokes Cathal into giving him more and more apples, ultimately persuading the king to fast with him. After MacConglinne has got the king to fast for two consecutive nights, he prepares a vast meal of roasted meats and has Cathal lashed to the walls of his palace. Then he taunts the demon of gluttony by passing bits of roast meat before Cathal's mouth and eating them himself. Cathal roars for MacConglinne to be killed, but none of his men obey. MacConglinne relates to Cathal his vision of the land made of food, going into more and more detail about his adventures there, until "the lawless beast that abode in the inner bowels of Cathal MacFinguine came forth, until it was licking his lips outside his head." MacConglinne traps the demon under a cauldron and has the king's men evacuate the palace of all people and property, then he has the palace set on fire. The demon escapes to the roof of the house and MacConglinne demands that it "do obeisance", i.e. bow down to them. The demon replies defiantly:

I have been three half-years in Cathal's mouth, to the ruin of Munster and the Southern Half besides, and if I were to continue three half years more, I should ruin all Ireland.

MacConglinne threatens the demon with the Gospels, and it flies "into the air among the people of hell." Cathal rewards MacConglinne for curing him, and the tale concludes with a list of rewards owed to anyone who is able to recite it in its entirety.
