= Jean Rosenthal =

American lighting designer

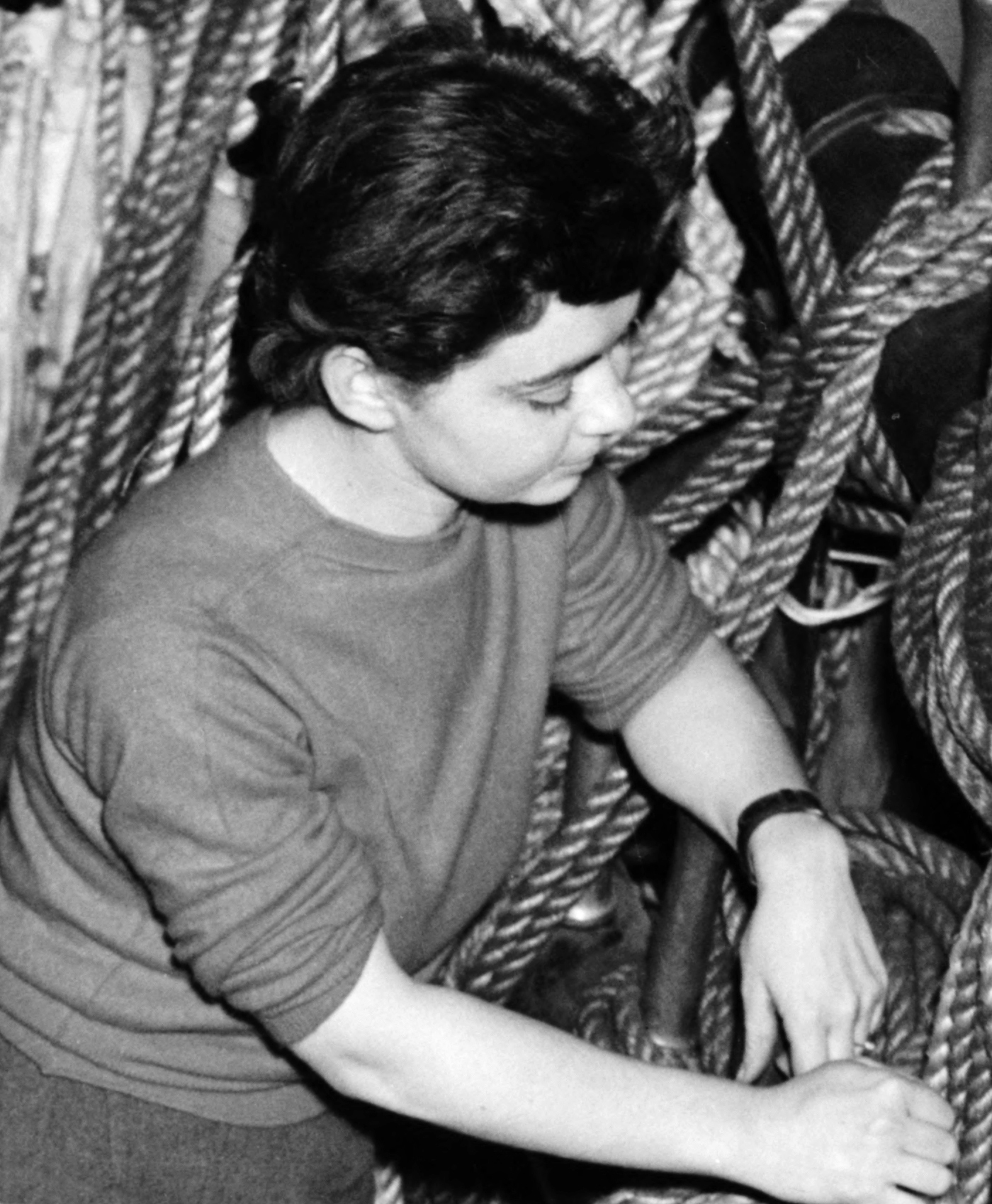
Jean Rosenthal working on the Federal Theatre Project production Horse Eats Hat (1936)

Jean Rosenthal (born Eugenia Rosenthal; March 16, 1912 – May 1, 1969) was an American lighting designer. She is considered a pioneer in the field of theatrical lighting design. She was born in New York City to Romanian-Jewish immigrants.

In the early part of the 20th century, the lighting designer was not a formalized position; the set designer or electrician handled the lighting of a production. Rosenthal helped make the lighting designer an integral member of the design team. She also said that lighting "was a career in itself". As well as particular lighting innovations, she created an atmosphere specific to the production, and she was in demand as a Broadway lighting designer.

== Career and education ==
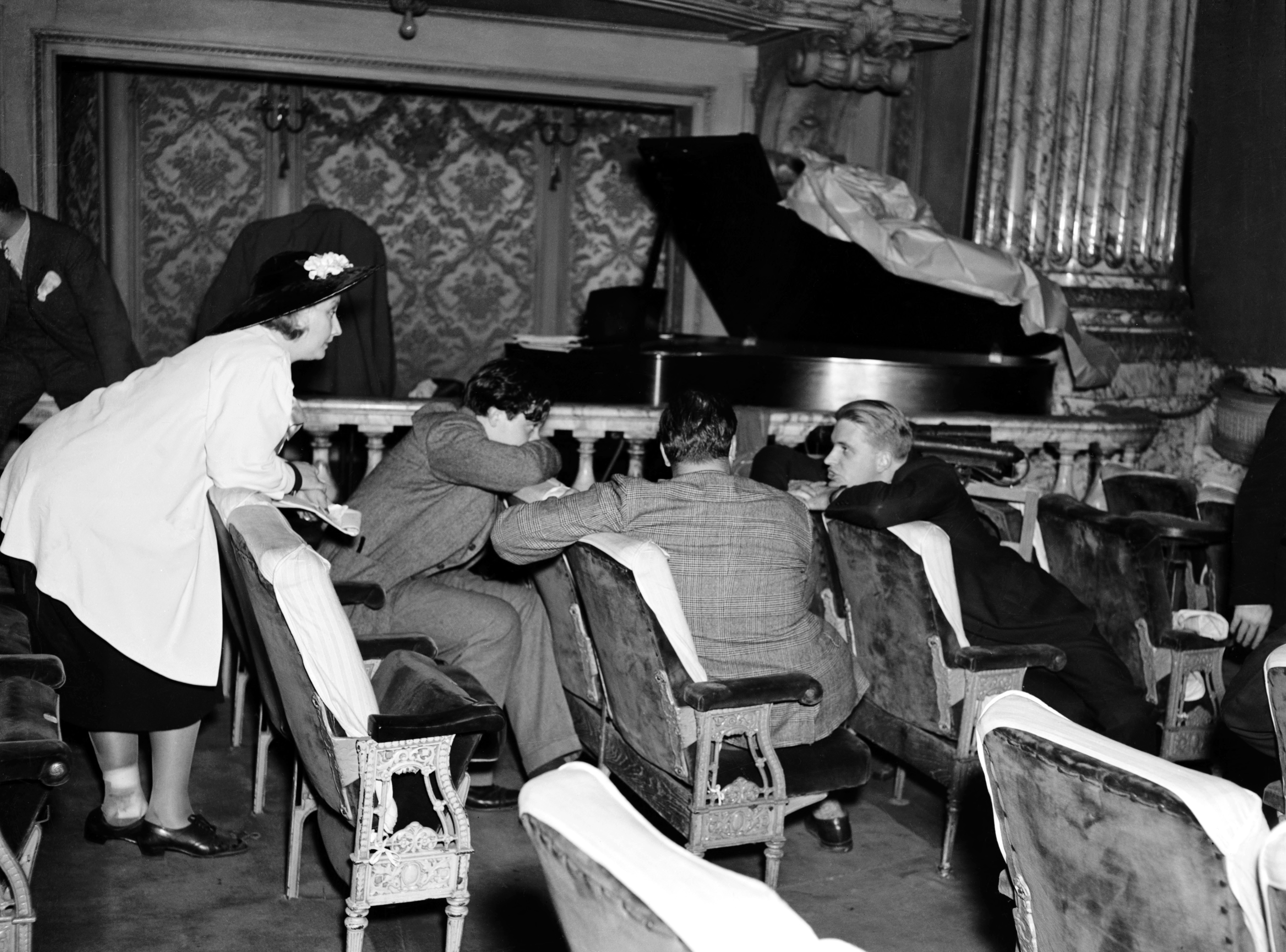
From left, Rosenthal, Orson Welles, John Houseman and Edwin Denby during a rehearsal of Horse Eats Hat at Maxine Elliott's Theatre (1936)

In 1929, Rosenthal was introduced to Martha Graham at the Neighborhood Playhouse School of the Theatre. She became Graham's technical assistant, which led to a lifelong collaboration with Graham. She worked with Graham on 36 productions. Rosenthal studied lighting design at the Yale School of Drama from 1931 to 1934 with Stanley McCandless and George Pierce Baker.

She returned to New York City, where she joined the Federal Theatre Project in 1935. This led to collaborations with Orson Welles and John Houseman. She later followed them to the Mercury Theatre, where she was credited as a member of the board in addition to production and lighting manager, although not as lighting designer.

She was lighting designer for hundreds of productions, including numerous Broadway shows, Martha Graham's dances, the New York City Ballet, and the Metropolitan Opera. On Broadway she lit musicals such as West Side Story (1957), The Sound of Music (1959), Take Me Along (1959), A Funny Thing Happened on the Way to the Forum (1962), Fiddler on the Roof (1964), Hello, Dolly! (1964), Cabaret (1966), and The Happy Time (1968).

== Contributions ==
Some of her major contributions were the elimination of shadows by using flood lights from upstage positions and controlling angles and mass of illumination to create contrasts without shadows. "Some of the signature lighting she did for Balanchine and the diagonal shaft of light she created for Graham (lovingly referred to by her as 'Martha's Finger of God'), are now in such widespread use by dance companies of every style that they have become standards of the lighting repertoire."

== The Magic of Light ==
Jean Rosenthal's book, The Magic of Light: The Craft and Career of Jean Rosenthal, Pioneer in Lighting for the Modern Stage, (Little Brown & Co, ISBN 0-316-93120-9) was published posthumously in 1972. Lael Wertenbaker assembled the book, a long-running project between her and Rosenthal, from tape-recorded dictation sessions.

The book begins with an autobiography, and goes on to detail the history of illumination, and methods for lighting plays, musicals, operas, and the house. It later details theatrical lighting equipment in use at the time of its publication. The Magic of Light concludes with samples of Rosenthal's paperwork (light plots, hookups, and focus charts), and a list of her lighting credits.

== Death ==
On May 1, 1969, she died of ovarian cancer at the age of 57. Rosenthal shared her apartment and her vacation home on Martha's Vineyard with lighting designer Marion Kinsella; for a period of time, she also lived with another lighting designer, Nananne Porcher.
