= Aedh Ua Con Ceanainn =

Aedh Ua Con Ceanainn (died 1067) was King of Uí Díarmata. He was a supporter of Áed in Gai Bernaig, king of Connacht. He fought and died with him at the battle of Turlach Adhnaigh in Aidhne, in 1067.

The battle of Turlach Adhnaigh, between Áed in Gai Bernaig, King of Connaught, and Aedh, the son of Art Uallach Ua Ruairc (Áed Ua Ruairc), and the men of Breifne along with him; where fell Áed in Gai Bernaig, King of the province of Connaught, the helmsman of the valour of Leath-Chuinn; and the chiefs of Connaught fell along with him, and, among the rest, Aedh Ua Con Ceanainn, lord of Uí Díarmata, and many others. It was to commemorate the death of Aedh Ua Conchobhair this quatrain was composed:"Seven years, seventy, not a short period/And a thousand, great the victory/From the birth of Christ/not false the jurisdiction/Till the fall of Aedh, King of Connaught."

Preceded by Muirgeas ua Cú Ceanainn	King of Uí Díarmata; 1037–1067	Succeeded by Muirgheas Ua Cú Ceannainn
