= Muirgheas Ua Cú Ceannainn =

King of Uí Díarmata

Muirgheas Ua Cú Ceannainn (died 1106) was King of Uí Díarmata.

== Biography ==
The Annals of Ulster record that "Niall Odar ua Conchobuir was killed. Muirgius ua Conchenaind died.", but no connection is drawn between the two events. Muirgius's apparent successor was Aedh Ua Con Ceannainn.

| Preceded by Aedh Ua Con Ceanainn | King of Uí Díarmata; 1067?–1106 | Succeeded by Aedh Ua Con Ceannainn |
