= Cú Ceanain Ó Con Ceanainn =

King of Uí Díarmata, Ireland

Cú Ceanain Ó Con Ceanainn (died 1224) was King of Uí Díarmata, Ireland.

== Overview ==
Cú Ceanain was a contemporary, and subject of, Cathal Crobhdearg Ua Conchobair, King of Connacht, who may have been his foster brother. The succession is unclear for almost a century till Donnell Ó Con Ceanainn is recorded as king upon his death at the Second Battle of Athenry in 1316.

| Preceded by Uada Ua Con Ceanainn | King of Uí Díarmata ?-1224 | Succeeded by Donnell Ó Con Ceanainn |
