= McCandlish =

Surname from south-west Scotland and sometimes north Ireland

McCandlish, MacCandlish
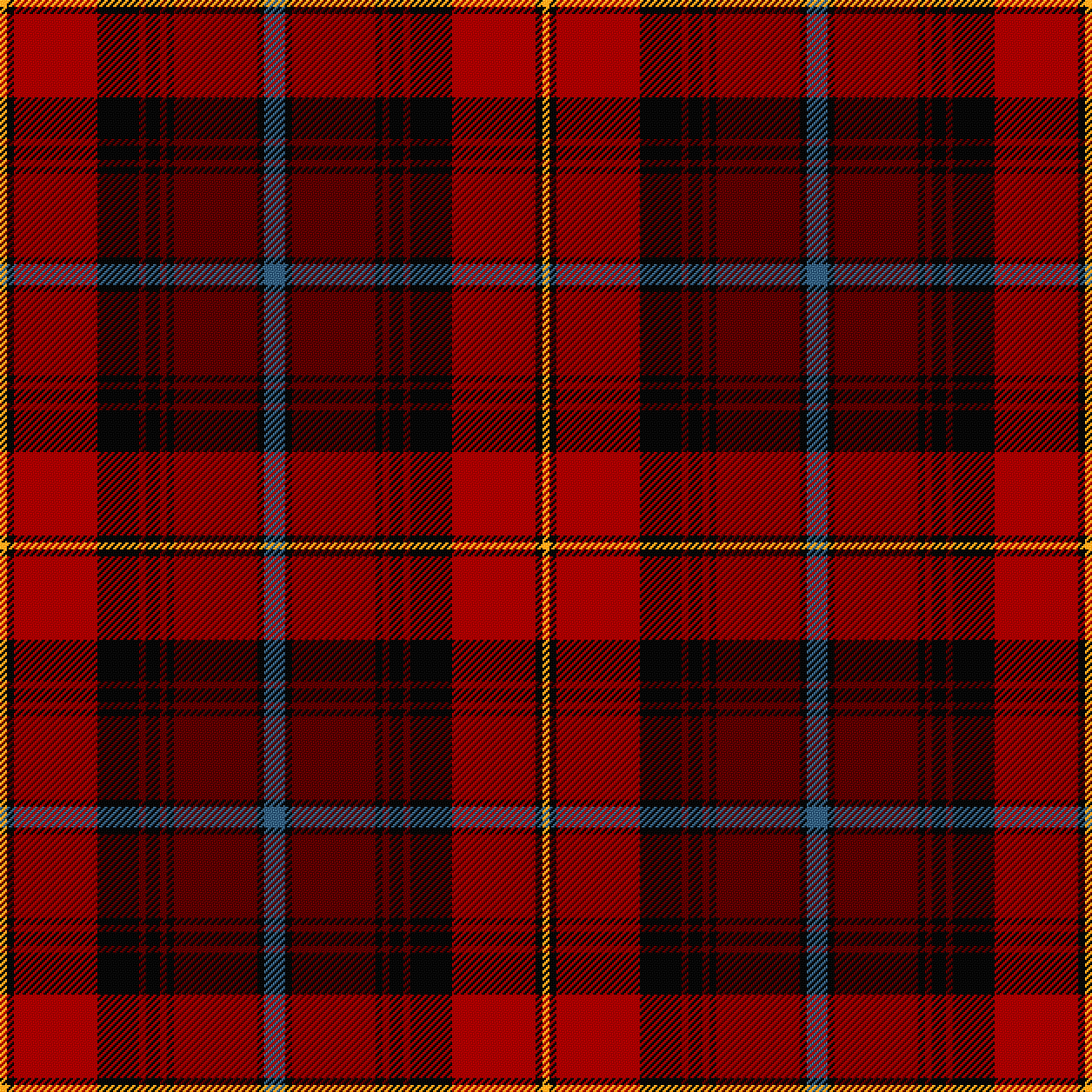
- McCandlish red tartan
- Pronunciation: /mɪkˈkænd.lɪʃ/
- Language: Anglicised Scottish Gaelic

Origin
- Meaning: 'Son of Cuindleas'
- Region of origin: Scotland (south-west), Ireland (north)

Other names
- Variant forms: McAndlish, McCanleis, McCaunles, McCandleish, and many others

McCandlish (/mɪkˈkænd.lɪʃ/, mik-CAND-lish is Scottish surname (and rarely also a given name), derived from Scottish Gaelic and Middle Irish Mac Cuindlis (among other spellings), meaning 'son of Cuindleas', an Old Irish given name of uncertain meaning.

== Variants ==
Some variants include McAndlish, McCanalish, McCandelich, McCandelish, McCandish, McCandlash, and McCandleis, among others. Spellings with Mac were believed to be extinct by the first half of the 20th century, but still survive among a few families, primarily in the United States and Canada. As with other names of this sort, versions with M' were also attested until the early 20th century.

The name is closely related to McCandless (from the same derivation), found in Scotland and especially the north of Ireland (Ulster). Some recorded north Irish variants are more similar to McCandlish, e.g. McCandleish, while some Scottish variants are closer to McCandless, e.g. McCanleis and McCaunles. McCandlish itself has also sometimes historically been attested in Northern Ireland.

It is etymologically but probably not familially related to Ó Cuindlis, 'descendant of Cuindleas', a literary family of Uí Mháine in west-central Ireland. The earliest form of the given name can be traced back to an abbot from the 8th century called Cuindles.

== Surname ==
- Benjamin McCandlish (1886–1975), United States Navy flag officer; 36th naval governor of Guam
- Edward Gerstell McCandlish (1887–1946), American illustrator, mapmaker, toymaker, and author of the Bunny Tots series of children's books (1920s); perhaps best known for illustrating Laboulaye's Fairy Book
- John Edward Chalmers McCandlish CB CBE (1901–1974), British Army major-general
- John MacGregor McCandlish (1821–1901), Scottish lawyer; first president of the Faculty of Actuaries
- Mackey McCandlish, animator, game designer, and co-creator of Blahbalicious
- Margherita McCandlish née Wood (1892–1954), former first lady of Guam, wife of Benjamin
- William Leslie McCandlish, British dog breeder

== Given name ==
- McCandlish Phillips (1927–2013), American journalist and evangelist

== See also ==
- Candlish, a derived Scottish surname
- McCandless (surname), a more common Scots-Irish form of the name, primarily found in the north of Ireland
- Ó Cuindlis, a west Irish surname dating to the 14th century; anglicized as Conlisk, Cundlish, Quinlist, and several other variants
