= Duniry =

Townland in County Galway, Ireland

Coordinates: 53.1346°N 8.4054°W

Duniry (Irish: Dún Doighre) is a townland, with a small village centre, between Tynagh and Abbey, in County Galway, Ireland. Nearby is the townland of Limehill, the south of which has a bog. Duniry is in a civil parish of the same name.

Duniry's most noted landmark was Egan's castle, now derelict; it flourished from 1450 to 1600 and is associated with stories of Clanricarde and their brehons. In the early 15th century, Murchadh Ó Cuindlis probably compiled An Leabhar Breac at Duniry.

The local hurling club is Tynagh-Abbey/Duniry GAA.
