= William Nixon (minister) =

Minister of the Free Church of Scotland

William Nixon (1803–1900) was a Scottish minister of the Free Church of Scotland who served as Moderator of the General Assembly in 1868/69. In Montrose he was nicknamed the "Lion of St John's".

== Life ==
He was born in Camlachie in central Scotland on 3 May 1803. His father John Nixon was a merchant in Glasgow.

He studied at Glasgow University from 1814 aged only 10 (14 was then the norm to attend university). However he did not graduate until 1825. He then assisted at Whitsome in the Scottish Borders for 5 years.

He was ordained by the Church of Scotland in 1831. He was assistant to Andrew Robson at Newcastle upon Tyne. He was installed at Hexham in Northumberland (the Scottish churches were also represented in the north of England). In 1833 he was translated to St John's Church in Montrose to replace the Rev Thomas Liddell.

In the Disruption of 1843 he left the established church and joined the Free Church of Scotland. Because St John's was a quoad sacra church it was permitted to transfer to the Free Church. A new manse was not built until 1862.

In 1863 he succeeded Rev Robert Candlish as Convenor of the Free Church Education Committee and was one of the main forces in the creation of the 600 Free Church schools and organised their transfer to the state in the Education (Scotland) Act 1872. In 1868 he succeeded Rev Robert Smith Candlish as Moderator of the General Assembly, the highest position in the Free Church.

He retired in 1876 and moved to Edinburgh living at 3 Seton Place in the Grange. In 1892 he relocated to Burntisland to be near family and he died there of influenza on 24 January 1900 aged 96.

His position at St Johns Free Church was filled by Rev George S Sutherland.

== Publications ==
- Introductory Essay to Mair's Explanation of the Assembly's Shorter Catechism (Montrose, 1837)
- Remarks on Christian Education (Edinburgh, 1838)
- Reply to Anti-Endowment Speakers and Defence of Church Extension Scheme (Glasgow, 1839)
- Civil and Spiritual Jurisdiction, a sermon (Edinburgh, 1840)
- Our Duty to the Young (Edinburgh, 1841)
- Sixty-one Pleas for Sabbath-breaking answered (Edinburgh, 1847)
- Account of the late Work of God at Ferryden (Edinburgh, 1860)
- The Doctrine of Election (1861)
- The Two Meanings; or, the Hollow and Deceptive Character of "The Articles of Agreement" as at present adjusted, a speech (Edinburgh, 1869)
- The Kingdom of the Nations, and the Duty of Earthly Riders to His Truth and Kingdom, a sermon (Edinburgh, 1869)
- A Forewarning of the Troubles before us, from the present Movement for the Union of the Churches (Montrose, 1870)
- All and in All, published sermons (1882)
- Instrumental Music in the Public Worship of our Church Unwarranted (Edinburgh, 1883)
- Sermon XLIII. (Free Church Pulpit, i.)
- joint editor of The Free Church Missionary Record from 1844 to 1853

== Family ==
In 1835 he married Margaret Sidgley. Following her death in 1865 he married Janet Craig in 1875.

Children from the first marriage included John Nixon (1836–1886) Free Church minister of Barrhill, South Ayrshire.
