= 1007 =

Calendar year

1007 in various calendars
- Gregorian calendar: 1007; MVII
- Ab urbe condita: 1760
- Armenian calendar: 456; ԹՎ ՆԾԶ
- Assyrian calendar: 5757
- Balinese saka calendar: 928–929
- Bengali calendar: 413–414
- Berber calendar: 1957
- English Regnal year: N/A
- Buddhist calendar: 1551
- Burmese calendar: 369
- Byzantine calendar: 6515–6516
- Chinese calendar: 丙午年 (Fire Horse); 3704 or 3497 — to — 丁未年 (Fire Goat); 3705 or 3498
- Coptic calendar: 723–724
- Discordian calendar: 2173
- Ethiopian calendar: 999–1000
- Hebrew calendar: 4767–4768
- Hindu calendars
- Vikram Samvat: 1063–1064
- Shaka Samvat: 928–929
- Kali Yuga: 4107–4108
- Holocene calendar: 11007
- Igbo calendar: 7–8
- Iranian calendar: 385–386
- Islamic calendar: 397–398
- Japanese calendar: Kankō 4 (寛弘４年)
- Javanese calendar: 909–910
- Julian calendar: 1007; MVII
- Korean calendar: 3340
- Minguo calendar: 905 before ROC 民前905年
- Nanakshahi calendar: −461
- Seleucid era: 1318/1319 AG
- Thai solar calendar: 1549–1550
- Tibetan calendar: མེ་ཕོ་རྟ་ལོ་ (male Fire-Horse); 1133 or 752 or −20 — to — མེ་མོ་ལུག་ལོ་ (female Fire-Sheep); 1134 or 753 or −19

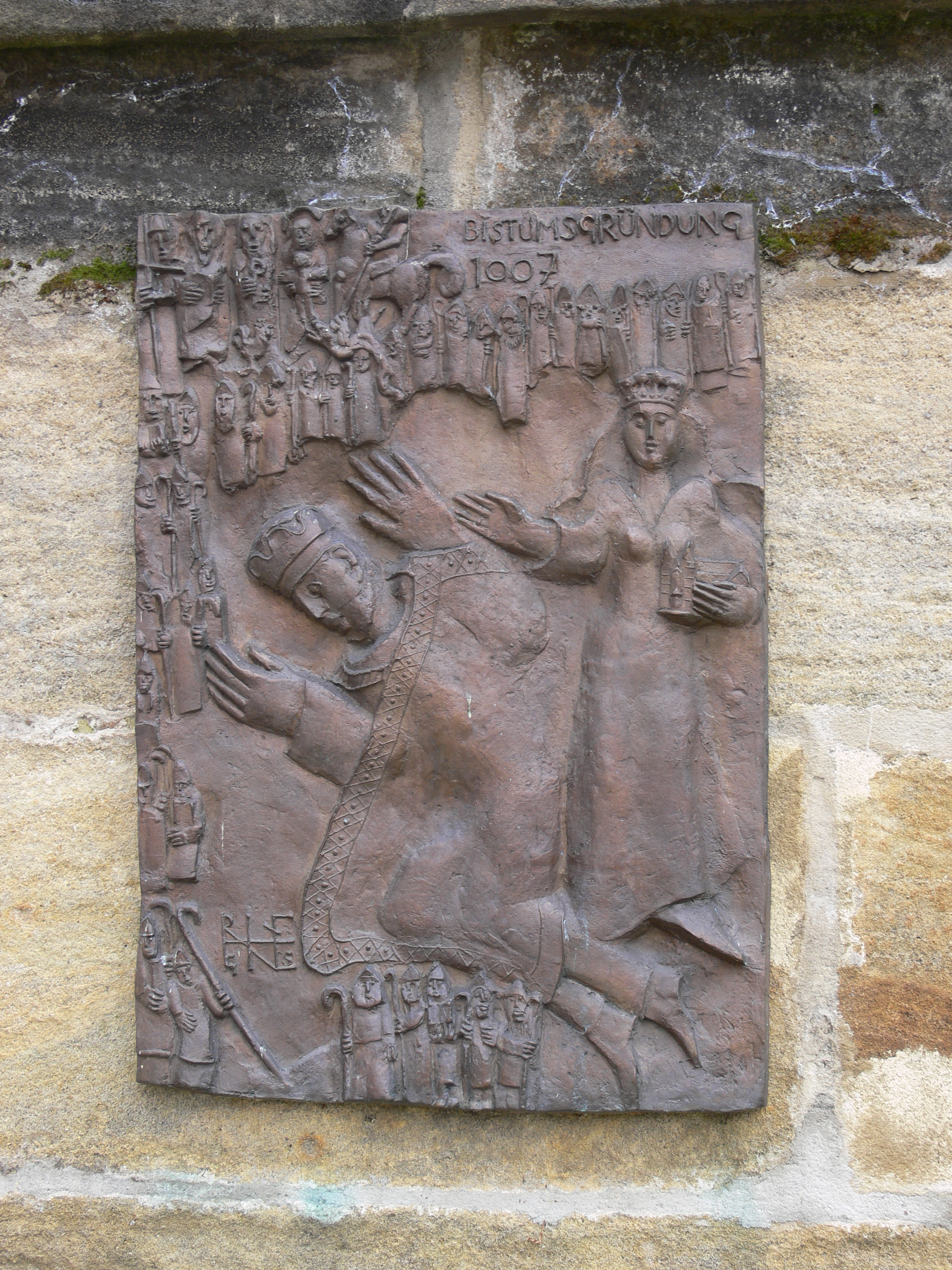
Founding of the Archdiocese of Bamberg

Year 1007 (MVII) was a common year starting on Wednesday of the Julian calendar.

== Events ==
=== By place ===
==== England ====
- King Æthelred the Unready pays the Danish Vikings a sum of 36,000 pounds of silver (Danegeld) to stop further invasions.

==== Ireland ====
- The Book of Kells is stolen from the Abbey of Kells.

==== Japan ====
- January 1 (New Year’s Day) – Imperial Princess Shushi is granted the title Ippon Shinno (first rank princess).
- January 29 – Ranking ceremony of Murasaki Shikibu – as a renowned writer and lady-in-waiting, tutor of Empress Shōshi, she is elevated to the highest position in the palace below the empress.
- April – Imperial Prince Tomohira receives the title nihon (second rank prince).

=== By topic ===
==== Religion ====
- November 1 – King Henry II of Germany founds the Diocese of Bamberg during a synod held in Frankfurt.
- Ælfheah of Canterbury travels to Rome to receive his pallium – symbol of his status as an archbishop – from Pope John XVIII.
- The Keraites, a Turco-Mongolian tribe, are converted to Nestorianism (a sect of Christianity).

== Births ==
- Emeric, Hungarian prince and co-heir (approximate date)
- Gervais de Château-du-Loir, French nobleman (d. 1067)
- Giselbert, count of Luxembourg (approximate date)
- Hugh Magnus (Hugues le Grand), king of France (d. 1025)
- Ibn Sidah, Andalusian linguist and lexicographer (d. 1066)
- Isaac I Komnenos, Byzantine emperor (approximate date)
- Maitripada, Indian Buddhist philosopher (d. 1085)
- Ouyang Xiu, Chinese historian and poet (d. 1072)
- Peter Damian, cardinal-bishop of Ostia (d. 1073)
- Welf III, duke of Carinthia (approximate date)

== Deaths ==
- February 27 – Ælfwaru, English noblewoman
- March 20 – Abu Rakwa, Andalusian Umayyad prince
- July 21 – Gisela of Burgundy, duchess of Bavaria
- October 31 – Heriger, abbot of Lobbes (Belgium)
- Attilanus, bishop of Zamora (Spain) (b. 937)
- Badi' al-Zaman al-Hamadani, Persian poet (b. 969)
- Guo, empress of the Song dynasty (b. 975)
- Manjutakin, Fatimid general and governor
- Maslama al-Majriti, Andalusian chemist
- Pelayo Rodríguez, count (comes) of León
- Sebastian, archbishop of Esztergom
- Urraca Fernández, Galician queen
