= Giolla Comáin mac Néill =

Giolla Comáin mac Néill (died 991) (Middle Irish Gilla Commáin mac Néill) was king of Uí Díarmata.

== Background ==
Giolla Comáin mac Néill was a member of the SíOl Muiredaig dynasty, who ruled as kings of The Connachta in what is now central County Roscommon. By the mid-10th century they had expanded south-west into the north-east of County Galway. Here a branch of the kindred seized territory and renamed it Uí Díarmata, after its founder, Diarmada Finn mac Tomaltaig, who was in turn a great-grandson of King Indrechtach mac Muiredaig (died 723).

== Death and successors ==
Giolla Comáin mac Néill is not known to be attested in the genealogies, nor is there any other reference to him or his father, Niall. He was king in 991 but was at war with Cú Ceanain mac Tadhg, a son of his predecessor. The war ended with their mutual deaths, and another unattested member of the Uí Díarmata, Muirgheas mac Aedh, became king. Gillacommain left no known descendants, and after 999, all subsequent Uí Díarmata kings descended from Cú Ceanain mac Tadhg.

| Preceded by Tadhg mac Muirchertach | King of Uí Díarmata; 971?-991 | Succeeded by Muirgheas mac Aedh |
