= List of monarchs of Déisi Muman =

The Déisi Muman (Muman is old Irish for Munster) were a powerful people in early medieval Ireland, ruling over parts of Munster. This list compiles known monarchs of the Déisi, including names from primary historical sources and genealogical references, with most details derived from Séamus Pender’s Déssi Genealogies.

== Early kings ==
- Dubthach Dubtaire m. Forgnae, king of the Déisi Breg (early 5th century).
- Áed Bolg m. Fíngen, king of the Déisi, father-in-law of Diarmait Ruanaid, died 665.
- Cobthach, king of the Déisi, died 632.
- Máel Ochtraig, king of the Déisi, died 645. Likely the same as Máel Ochtraig m. Dínertaig, king of the Déisi Muman, whose father-in-law was Faílbe Flann.
- Suibne m. Comáin, died 658. A significant early ruler mentioned in genealogical records succession of Kings, and likely one of the most influential early kings of the Déisi, bridging the historical lineage between earlier tribal leaders and later monarchs.
- Bran Find m. Máil Ochtraig, king of the Déisi Muman, died 671.
- Congal m. Suibne, king of the Déisi, died 701. Also recorded as a surety of the Cáin Adamnáin in 697.
- Cormac Mór m. Rossa, king of the Déisi, died 731.
- Daithgius m. Baíth, king of the Déisi, died 732.
- Muirgius m. Fergusa, king of the Déisi, died 751.
- Niallgus m. Baíth, king of the Déisi Breg, died 758.
- Dúnchad m. Éogáin, king of the Déisi, died 764.
- Torpad m. Cernaig, king of the Déisi, died 765.
- Flann m. Rothniuil, king of the Déisi (8th century).

== 9th–10th century kings ==
- Fínnachta m. Badbchada, king of the Déisi, died 823.
- Cormac m. Domnaill, king of the Déisi, died 827.
- Máel Cróin m. Muiredaig, leth-rí (half-king) of the Déisi, died 858.
- Rechtabra m. Findbrain, king of the Déisi, died 876.
- Niall m. Cormaic, king of the Déisi, died 891.
- Niall m. Lóegaire, king of the Déisi, died 894.
- Buadach m. Mothlai, king of the Déisi, died 910.
- Cormac m. Mothlai, king of the Déisi, died 919.
- Cormac m. Cuilennáin, king of the Déisi, died 920.
- Célechair m. Cormaic, king of the Déisi, died 941.
- Fáelán m. Cormaic, king of the Déisi Muman, died 966.
- Domnall m. Fáeláin, king of the Déisi, died 996.

== 11th–12th century kings ==
- Áed, king of the Déisi, died 1009.
- Mothla m. Domnaill m. Fáeláin, king of the Déisi Muman, died 1014 at the Battle of Clontarf.
- Diarmait m. Domnaill m. Fáeláin, king of the Déisi, died 1031.
- Gilla Fulartaig, king of the Déisi Breg, died 1034.
- Muirchertach m. Bricc, king of the Déisi Muman, died 1051.
- Ua Géibennaig, king of the Déisi Bec, died 1058.
- Máel Sechlainn Ua Bricc, king of the Déisi, died 1059.
- Máel Sechlainn m. Gilla Brigte Ua Fáeláin, king of the Déisi, died 1085.
- Muirchertach Ua Bricc, king of the Déisi, died 1090.
- Gerr na Cuinneóc Ua Bricc, king of the Déisi, died 1153.
- Máel Sechlainn Ua Fáeláin, king of the Déisi, fl. 1170.

== 13th century kings ==
- Art Corp Ua Fáeláin, king of the Déisi, died 1203.
- Domnall Ua Fáeláin, king of the Déisi, died 1205 or 1206.
