= James Smith Candlish =

Scottish Minister

James Smith Candlish (1835–1897) was a Scottish minister of the Free Church of Scotland who was a professor of theology in Glasgow.

== Life ==
He was born on 14 December 1835 at 9 Castle Street in Edinburgh's New Town the son of Jessie Brock and her husband, Rev Robert Smith Candlish. He was named after a recently deceased uncle, James Smith Candlish. He was educated at Edinburgh Academy. He then took a general degree at the University of Edinburgh graduating with an MA in 1858 then studied divinity at New College, Edinburgh. He spent some time in Europe studying at Berlin and Erlangen University.

At the Disruption of 1843, his father was one of the leading figures in the creation of the Free Church of Scotland.

James was ordained as a Free Church of Scotland minister at Logiealmond in 1863. He was translated to Aberdeen East in 1868.

In 1872, he became Professor of Systematic Theology at the Free Church College in Glasgow. He lived at 5 Royal Circus.

The University of Glasgow awarded him an honorary doctorate (DD) in 1874. He famously defended the controversial views of Prof Robertson Smith.

He died on 7 March 1897 at the Free Church manse in Tarbolton.

== Family ==
In 1872, he married Ann Elizabeth Simpson, daughter of Dr Simpson of Kintore, at Old Machar in Aberdeen.

== Publications ==
- The Kingdom of God: Biblically and Historically Considered
- The Christian Sacraments
- The Christian Doctrine of God
- The Work of the Holy Spirit
- The Biblical Doctrine of Sin
- The Epistle to the Ephesians
- The Christian Salvation: Lectures on the Work of Christ
