= Robert Smith Candlish =

Scottish minister (1806–1873)

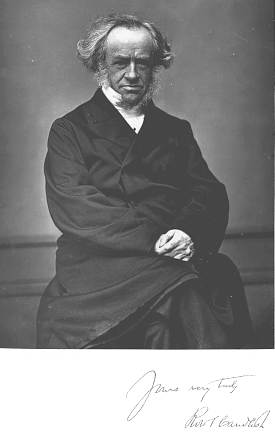
- Church: Free Church of Scotland

Personal details
- Born: 23 March 1806 Edinburgh, Scotland
- Died: 19 October 1873 (aged 67) Edinburgh, Scotland
- Spouse: Jessie Brock (m. 1835)
- Children: 10, including James
- Occupation: Minister
- Education: University of Glasgow

Robert Smith Candlish (23 March 1806 – 19 October 1873) was a Scottish minister who was a leading figure in the Disruption of 1843. He served for many years in both St. George's Church and St George's Free Church on Charlotte Square in Edinburgh's New Town.

== Early life and education ==
He was born at 11 West Richmond Street in Edinburgh, the son of James Candlish (originally McCandlish; 1759-1806), a lecturer in medicine and friend of Robert Burns. James died soon after Robert was born. He and his siblings were raised by his mother, Jane Smith (1768–1854). She moved to Glasgow soon after her husband's death and survived by running a boarding house at 49 Virginia Street.

In 1820, he began studying divinity at Glasgow University, where he graduated in 1823. During the years 1823–1826, he went through the prescribed course at the divinity hall, then presided over by Rev. Dr Stevenson McGill. On leaving, he accompanied a pupil as private tutor to Eton College, where he stayed two years.

== Career ==
In 1829, Candlish entered upon his life's work, having been licensed to preach during the summer vacation of the previous year. After short assistant pastorates at St Andrew's Church, Glasgow, and then the parish church of Bonhill in Dunbartonshire, he became assistant minister to Rev. James Martin of St George's, Edinburgh. He attracted the attention of his audience by his intellectual keenness, emotional fervour, spiritual insight, and power of dramatic representation of character and life. His theology was that of the Scottish Calvinistic school, and he gathered round him one of the largest congregations in the city.

In 1840, he was living at 9 Randolph Crescent in Edinburgh's West End, a huge terraced townhouse.

Candlish took an interest in ecclesiastical questions, and he soon became involved in the struggle which was then agitating the Church of Scotland. His first Assembly speech, delivered in 1839, placed him among the leaders of the party that afterwards formed the Free Church, and his influence in bringing about the Disruption of 1843 was second only to that of Thomas Chalmers. He took his stand on two principles: the right of the people to choose their ministers, and the independence of the church in things spiritual. On his advice, Hugh Miller was appointed editor of the Witness and Miller wrote much of the weekly copy.

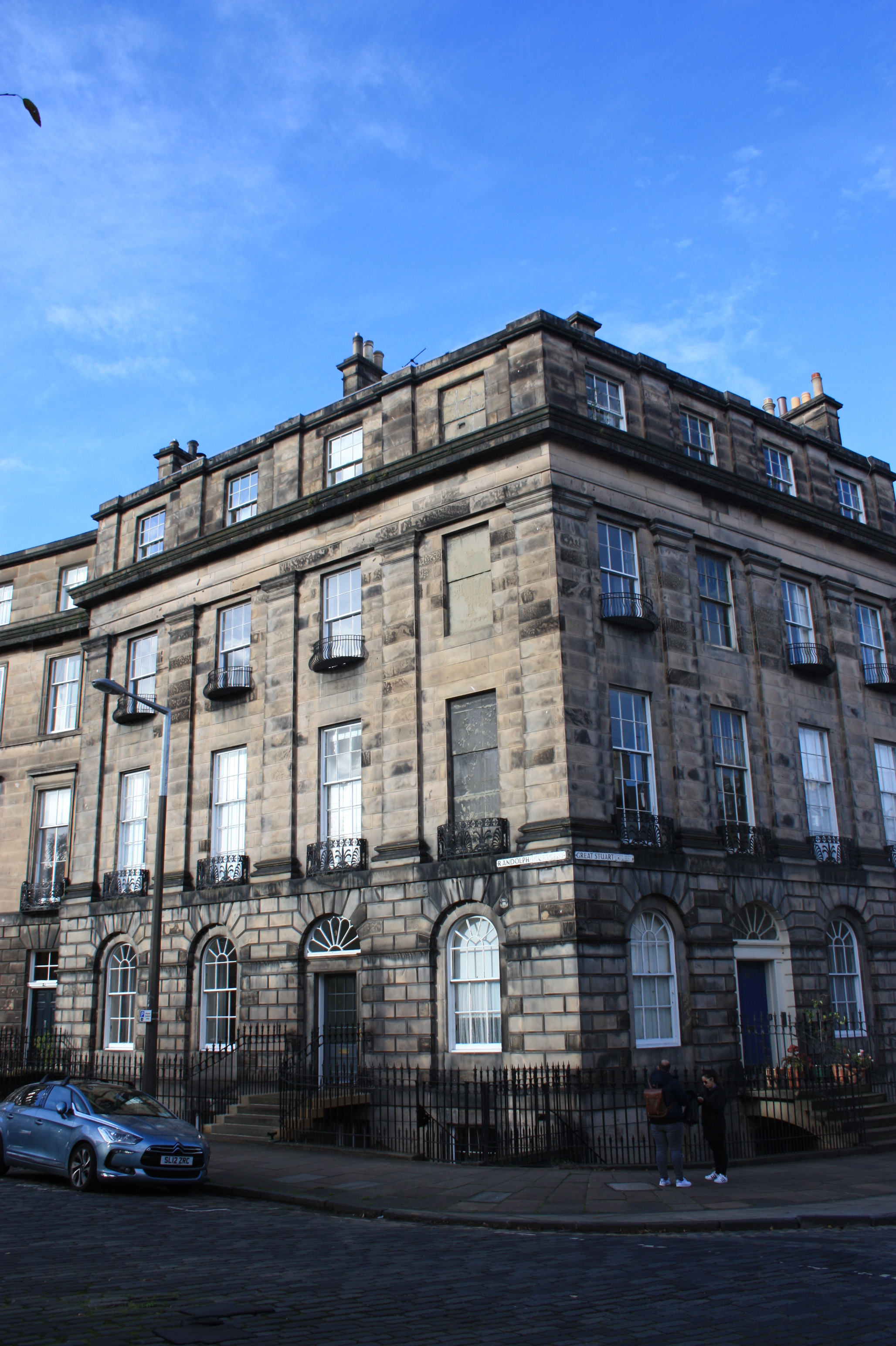
9 Randolph Crescent, Edinburgh

Following the Disruption, Candlish was one of the Free Churchmen who spoke in England, explaining the reason why so many had left the Established Church. He was actively engaged at one time or other in nearly all the various schemes of the church, but particularly the education committee, of which he was convener from 1846 to 1863, and in the unsuccessful negotiations for union among the non-established Presbyterian denominations of Scotland, which were carried on during the years 1863–1873. Candlish was the Free Church Moderator at the Assembly of 1867. He was succeeded in 1868 by Rev. William Nixon.

In 1841, the government nominated Candlish to the newly founded chair of Biblical criticism in the University of Edinburgh. However, owing to the opposition of Lord Aberdeen, the presentation was cancelled. In 1847 Candlish, who had received the degree of D.D. from Princeton, New Jersey, in 1841, was chosen by the Assembly of the Free Church to succeed Chalmers in the chair of divinity in the New College, Edinburgh. After partially fulfilling the duties of the office for one session, he was led to resume the charge of St George's, the clergyman who had been chosen by the congregation as his successor having died before entering on his work.

In 1851, he established a Gaelic Church on Cambridge Street. In 1862, he succeeded William Cunningham as principal of New College with the understanding that he should still retain his position as minister of St George's.

== Personal life ==
He married 6 January 1835, Jessie (died 16 September 1894), daughter of Walter Brock and Janet Crawford, and had issue —

- James Smith Candlish, D.D., minister at Logie-Almond and Aberdeen, Professor in Free Church College, Glasgow, 1872–97, born 14 December 1835, died 7 March 1897
- Jessie, born 14 January 1837, died 29 January 1893 (married 1865, William Anderson of Glentarkie)
- Jane Smith, born 14 June 1838, died 30 March 1840
- Walter, born 10 August 1839, died 20 February 1840
- Elizabeth Smith, born 28 December 1840 (married 1863, Archibald Henderson, D.D., United Free Church min. at Crieff)
- Agnes, born 3 August 1842, died 24 April 1845
- Robert Smith, marine engineer, born 21 April 1844, died 20 May 1887
- Margaret Charlotte, born 28 January 1846, died 16 April 1899
- John Bogle, insurance agent, Australia, born 2 November 1847
- Mary Ross, born 9 June 1851, died 30 September 1866.

Several of their children died in childhood.

== Death and burial ==
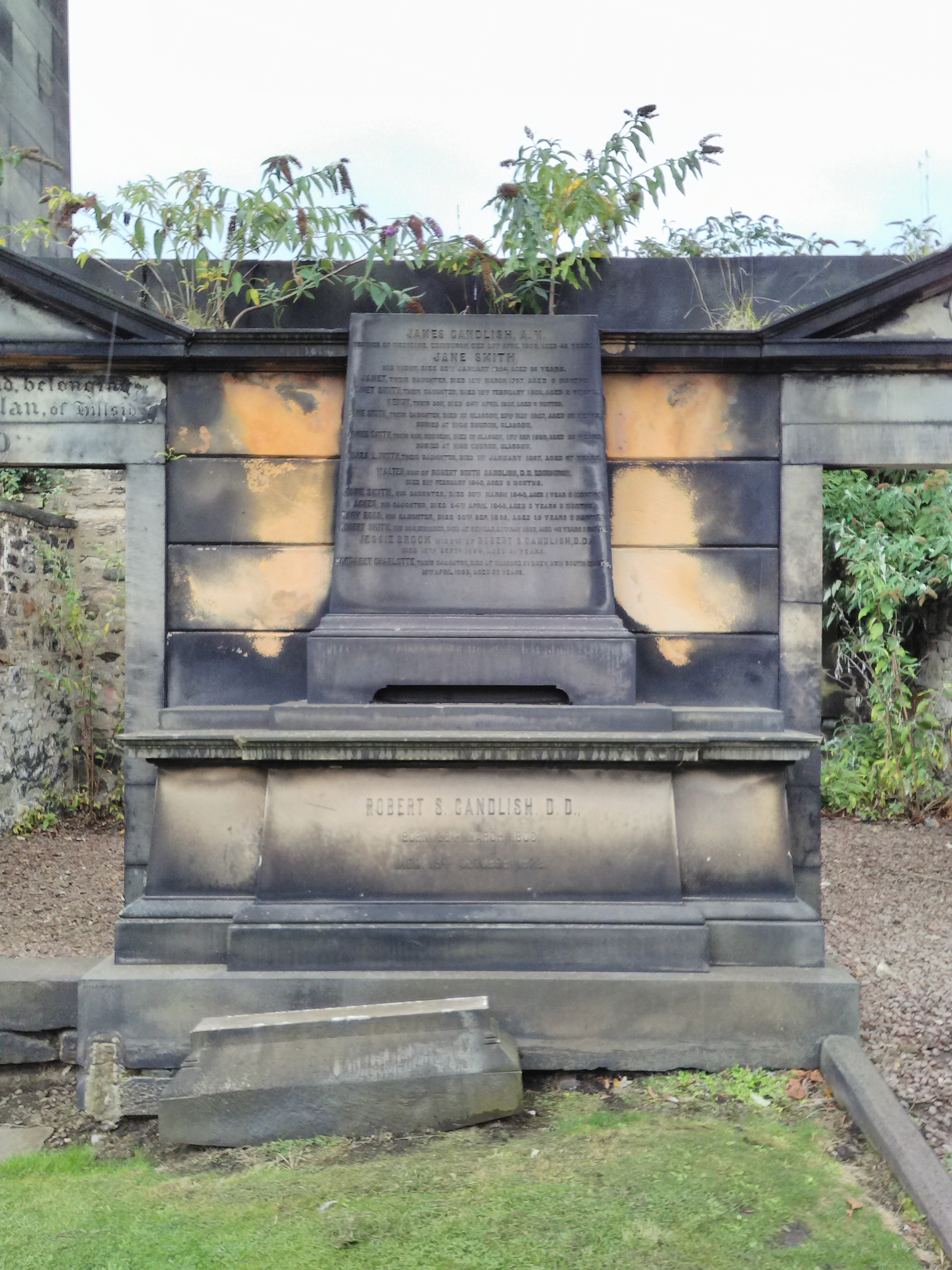
The grave of Rev. Robert Candlish, Old Calton Cemetery, Edinburgh

Candlish died at home, 52 Melville Street in Edinburgh in 1873.

As the Free Church lost the right to burial in the traditional parish burial grounds, Candlish is buried in the non-denominational Old Calton Burial Ground. He lies in the southern extension, just south-east of the Martyr's Monument.

== Works ==
Candlish made a number of contributions to theological literature. In 1842 he published the first volume of his Contributions towards the Exposition of the Book of Genesis, a work which was completed in three volumes several years later. In 1854 he delivered, in Exeter Hall, London, a lecture on the Theological Essays of the Rev. F. D. Maurice, which he afterwards published, along with a fuller examination of the doctrine of the essays. In this he defended the forensic aspect of the gospel. A treatise entitled The Atonement; its Reality, Completeness and Extent (1861) was based upon a smaller work which first appeared in 1845. In 1864 he delivered the first series of Cunningham lectures, taking for his subject The Fatherhood of God. Published immediately afterwards, the lectures excited considerable discussion on account of the peculiar views they represented. Further illustrations of these views were given in two works published about the same time as the lectures, one a treatise On the Sonship and Brotherhood of Believers, and the other an exposition of the first epistle of St John.

- Eleven single Sermons (Edinburgh, 1834, et seq.)
- Contributions towards the Exposition of the Book of Genesis, 3 vols. (Edinburgh, 1842–52)
- The Word of God the Instrument of the Propagation of the Gospel (1843)
- Scripture Characters and Miscellanies (Edinburgh, 1850)
- Reason and Revelation (Edinburgh, 1854)
- Man's Right to the Sabbath (Edinburgh, 1856)
- Life in a Risen Saviour (Edinburgh, 1858)
- The Atonement (Edinburgh, 1860)
- Two Great Commandments (Edinburgh, 1860)
- The Fatherhood of God (Edinburgh, 1865)
- Sermons, memoir (Edinburgh, 1874)
- Discourses on the Ephesians (Edinburgh, 1875)
- numerous pamphlets, etc.
