= Muirgeas ua Cú Ceanainn =

Irish regional king

Muirgeas ua Cú Ceanainn (died 1037) was King of Uí Díarmata.

== Overview ==
Muirgeas was a grandson of Cú Ceanain mac Tadhg, and seems to have reigned from 1021 to 1037. He was the first member of the Uí Díarmata dynasty to use the name ua Cú Ceanainn in a quasi-surname context. All subsequent kings and lords of Uí Díarmata, to the end of the 16th century, would use it as a surname, latter-day Concannon]

Events of his reign in Connacht and Ireland included:

- 1022 - Death of High King Máel Sechnaill mac Domnaill. The Norse of Dublin were defeated by the Ulaid in a naval engagement. Very great showers of hail fell in the summer, the stones of which were the size of wild apples; and great thunder and lightning succeeded, so that men and cattle were destroyed throughout Ireland.
- 1023 - The Termon of Cluain-mic-Nois was plundered by Gadhra Mór mac Dundach, and carried off many hundred cows from thence. King Tadg in Eich Gil of Connacht, fought a war in Uí Briúin
- 1032 -An eclipse of the sun on 31 August. Death of Mughron Ua Nioc, Abbot of Tuam.
- 1034 - Dubhdaingean, lord of Connaught, was slain by the Connaughtmen themselves.

Preceded by Mac Cú Ceanain	King of Uí Díarmata; 1021?–1037	Succeeded by Aedh Ua Con Ceanainn
