= An Leabhar Breac =

Medieval Irish vellum manuscript

- Royal Irish Academy
- Also known as: Speckled Book, Great Book of Dun Doighre
- Type: Compilation of Irish legends
- Date: 1408–1411
- Place of origin: Duniry
- Language(s): Middle Irish and Latin
- Scribe: Murchadh Ó Cuindlis
- Material: Vellum
- Size: 40.5 cm × 28 cm (16 in × 11 in)
- Format: Folio
- Script: Irish minuscule

Location of Duniry (Dún Doighre), Ireland

An Leabhar Breac ('The Speckled Book'; Middle Irish: An Lebar Brec), now less commonly Leabhar Mór Dúna Doighre ('Great Book of Dun Doighre') or possibly erroneously, Leabhar Breac Mic Aodhagáin ('The Speckled Book of the MacEgans'), is a medieval Irish vellum manuscript containing Middle Irish and Hiberno-Latin writings. The manuscript is held in the library of the Royal Irish Academy in Dublin, where it is catalogued as RIA MS 23 P 16 or 1230.

It was most probably compiled by Murchadh Riabhach Ó Cuindlis (of Ballaghdacker, Athleague) at Duniry between the years 1408 and 1411. Duniry – Dún Daighre, Dún Doighre – in eastern Clanricarde (now east County Galway) is situated south-east of the town of Loughrea, and in the medieval era was home to a branch of the bardic Clann Mac Aodhagáin (the MacEgans), who served as brehons for the O'Connors of Clanricarde.

== History ==
In the 16th century, the manuscript was in the possession of the Mac Egans of Duniry, hence the older title Leabhar Mór Dúna Doighre. In 1629, the manuscript was held in the convent of Kinalehin, County Galway.

It was consulted by Mícheál Ó Cléirigh, brother of the Four Masters, who copied pages 272–277. The book passed into the possession of Éamon Ó Ceallaigh (County Roscommon) in 1732, then of John O'Brien by 1768, and finally of Conchubhar (Bán) Ó Dála (Conchúr Bán Ó Dálaigh or Cornelius O'Daly) (Mitchelstown, County Cork). The Royal Irish Academy acquired the first volume in 1789 when General Charles Vallancey purchased it for the academy for three guineas from Cornelius O'Daly. O'Daly also owned the second volume, which comprises nine leaves, but was unaware that it belonged to the larger volume. In 1789, this volume was acquired by Chevalier O'Gorman, by George Smith of College Green in the next century, and by the academy sometime after 1844. The manuscript is held in the academy's library in Dublin to this day.

== Description ==
The manuscript is of a large size, measuring 40.5 cm x 28 cm, which makes it the largest Irish vellum manuscript to have been written by a single scribe. It contains 40 folios, which are written in double columns. Capitals are decorated in a simple style, with some letters having been interwoven with zoomorphic patterns and coloured in red, vermilion, yellow and blue. There are two drawings, a flower-like diagram on p. 121 and a drawing of the Crucifixion on p. 166.

== Contents ==
The manuscript consists almost entirely of religious writings in Latin and Middle Irish. It includes homiletic Lives of Saint Patrick, Saint Columba, Saint Brigid, Saint Cellach, and Saint Martin, the earliest version of Félire Óengusso ('Martyrology of Óengus'), the Rule of the Céli Dé, Aislinge Meic Con Glinne ('Vision of Mac Conglinne'), a version of Fís Adamnáin ('Vision of Adamnán'), Saltair na Rann, Stair Nicomeid ('Gospel of Nicodemus'), Amra Choluim Chille, a Marian litany, and various ecclesiastical legends, hymns, catecheses, and homilies. Exceptions to the predominantly religious contents are Sanas Cormaic ('Cormac's Glossary') and a history of Philip of Macedon and Alexander the Great.

== Glosses and notes ==
The numerous notes which Murchadh Ó Cuindlis jotted into the margins afford us a unique glimpse of the circumstances of the writing process. These range from everyday details like a cat straying about or a robin singing in a beautiful voice to a nearby pillage in Lorrha by a certain Murchad Ua Madagáin. A persistent object of complaint for the writer is the weather, in particular the cold. Based on the notes, Tomás Ó Con Cheanainn has been able to reconstruct the time span in which certain sections were written. For instance, it took the scribe about 6 weeks to write 35 pages (pp. 141–175), while some parts proved more challenging, such as a column for a poem with interlinear glosses, which cost him a day.

== See also ==
- Irish annals

== Sources ==
- Atkinson, Robert (ed. and tr.). The Passions and the Homilies from Leabhar Breac: Text, Translation, and Glossary. Todd Lecture Series II. Dublin, 1887. Edited text available online from CELT.
- Ó Longáin, Joseph (fasc.); Gilbert, J. J. (ed.). Leabhar Breac, the Speckled Book, otherwise styled Leabhar Mór Dúna Doighre, the Great Book of Dun Doighre. Dublin, 1876. Lithographic facsimile edition.
- O'Neill, Timothy. "Leabhar Breac". In Medieval Ireland. An Encyclopedia, ed. Seán Duffy. New York, 2004. pp. 266–267.
- Greene, David and Frank O’Connor (eds. & trs.). A Golden Treasury of Irish poetry, A.D. 600 to 1200. London: Macmillan, 1967.
- Gwynn, Edward J. (ed.); "Rule of the Céli Dé" (9b-12b). In The Rule of Tallaght. Hermathena 44, 2nd Supplement. 1927.
- Stokes, Whitley (ed. & tr.); "Betha Phatraic: Life of St Patrick" (Leabhar Breac pp. 24b-29b). Three Middle-Irish Homilies. Calcutta, 1877. Text edition and translation available online from CELT.
- Welsh, Robert. Oxford Concise Companion to Irish Literature. 1996. ISBN 0-19-280080-9
- "Irish Script on Screen" (Dublin Institute for Advanced Studies): images and description of Leabhar Breac.
