= Helena Concannon =

Irish politician and writer (1878–1952)

Senator
- In office 27 April 1938 – 27 February 1952
- Constituency: National University

Teachta Dála
- In office January 1933 – June 1937
- Constituency: National University

Personal details
- Born: Helena Walsh; 28 October 1878 Maghera, County Londonderry, Ireland
- Died: 27 February 1952 (aged 73) Dublin, Ireland
- Party: Fianna Fáil
- Spouse: Tomás Bán Ó Conceanainn (m. 1906)
- Relatives: Louis Joseph Walsh (brother)
- Education: Royal University of Ireland; National University of Ireland
- Profession: Historian; Writer; Language scholar

Helena Concannon (née Walsh; 28 October 1878 – 27 February 1952) was an Irish historian, writer, language scholar and Fianna Fáil politician.

Born in Maghera, County Londonderry, she attended secondary school in Dublin in Loreto North Great Georges Street and Loreto Stephen's Green. She attended university at the Royal University of Ireland in Belfast and then the National University of Ireland. She also studied abroad at the Sorbonne University Paris, Berlin University and in Rome. She was Professor of History at University College Galway. In her youth Concannon, as well as her husband, was a member of the Irish Fireside Club, which in the 1880s was the largest children's association in Ireland where children took responsibility upon themselves to teach others and themselves to make Ireland a better place.

Many of her writings were on the subject of Irish women, including Canon Sheehan's Woman Characters (1910), Women of Ninety Eight (1919), Daughters of Banba (1922), The Poor Clares in Ireland (1929), and Irish nuns in penal days (1931).

She was first elected to Dáil Éireann as a Fianna Fáil Teachta Dála (TD) at the 1933 general election for the National University constituency. At the 1938 general election, she was elected to Seanad Éireann for the National University of Ireland constituency. She was re-elected at each successive election and served in the Seanad until she died in 1952.

Her husband was the Irish scholar Tomás Bán Ó Conceanainn (Thomas Concannon), a national health inspector, and she authored several books as "Mrs Thomas Concannon".

== Academic career ==
Concannon was educated by the Loreto nuns in Coleraine. In 1897, she studied modern languages at the Royal University of Ireland on a three-year scholarship. She studied abroad during these years as in 1899, she travelled to Germany and studied German in Berlin University accompanied by her friend, Mary Macken. Concannon then travelled to France to study French in Sorbonne. In 1900, Concannon graduated Bachelor of Arts with first class honours and went on to study Master of Arts in 1902 at the Royal University of Ireland. Concannon was fortunate to being one of the first generation of educated women.

In 1906, Concannon married Tomás Bán Ó Conceanainn who she met in 1900, when he arrived home from America. They settled down in County Galway where they shared the same love for the Irish Language and wrote many Irish texts. They had no children. In Galway, Concannon was a professor at University College Galway where she taught history, which mainly involved the history of Irish Women. In 1909, Concannon was offered a lectureship at University College Dublin, in Italian, but the offer was then drawn before she could accept, so she decided to pursue a writing career.

== Writing career ==
In 1909 she was offered a lecturer position at University College Dublin and after the offer was withdrawn she began her writing career. She produced over twenty books, including works on religion, history of Ireland and Irish women's history. Her works were highly impacted by her political and nationalist views. Her 'analyses of Irish history was based on Catholicism and patriotism'. She was also an advocate of Irish language restoration.

Her first writings were love poems to her husband Tomás Bán Ó Conceanainn. These poems were 'simple, sensuous and passionate'.

She also produced a number of imaginative historical text for children. She used her married name for her publications and her first book was published in 1914 titled as A Garden of girls, or the famous schoolgirls of former days, it was about 'school life and education of real little girls'. Her next well known piece was the Life of St. Columban in 1915, which was a study about the Irish ancient monastic life and a biography of a sixth-century saint.

Two of her books, Daughters of Banba (1922) and St. Patrick (1932), received the Tailteann Medal for Literature, and The Poor Clares in Ireland (1929) won the National University Prize a DLitt higher doctorate degree for historical research.

Her most common publication the Women of Ninety Eight was dedicated to all the dead women and all the living ones who have given their loved ones. This book emerged on the ideologies of Catholicism and patriotism "praising the devotion of Irish nationalist women while emphasising the centrality of women's spiritual and domestic role in the home to the well-being of the nation" As this work was written during the time of the War of Independence, Concannon stressed the importance of women help during the rebellion as "they acted as messengers and intelligence officers", and in some cases, they fought as any men.

== Dáil career ==
Concannon was elected to the 8th Dáil for Fianna Fáil at the 1933 general election for the National University of Ireland constituency, serving from 8 February 1933 till 14 June 1937.

Concerning the Land Purchase (Guarantee Fund) Bill 1935, which according to Bennet would have negatively impacted the rural middle class of which he was a representative, Bennet accused Concannon and her fellow Dublin men of not caring about the people of the country "If Deputy Kelly, Deputy Donnelly or Deputy Mrs. Concannon were asked to apply a retrospective liability of this character to the citizens of Dublin, would they comply with the request? They know they would not. Because this Bill affects, in the main, the hardworking agriculturists, Deputy Kelly, Deputy Mrs. Concannon and other City Deputies can view it with equanimity."-Bennet. Concannon went on to vote that the Dail should disagree with the Seanad propose bill with 71 others

Though she was a TD as a university representative, she voted with her party to remove university representation from the Dáil, leading one TD to saying, "I am very much surprised to see such a distinguished scholar and such a great contributor to Irish literature as Deputy Mrs. Concannon voting for the disfranchisement of the University that she has so well and so ably represented."-Mr. J.M. Burke

Concannon spoke on behalf of Irish women in the Dáil in 1936. She spoke on how Irish women a fundamental role in Ireland's agricultural economy and so more money should be put towards educating these women.

Concannon was one of the minority voices against the role appointed to women in Éamon de Valera's constitution.

She did not contest the Dáil election of 1937.

== Seanad career ==
After the adoption of the Constitution of Ireland in 1937, the National University of Ireland constituency was reconstituted in the new Seanad Éireann. The first election took place in 1938, and Concannon was elected. She was a popular figure and was re-elected each election in the Seanad until she died in office in 1952.

== List of publications ==
- A Garden of Girls, or the Famous Schoolgirls of Former Days (London: Longmans, Green & Co. 1914).
- The Life of St. Columban (St. Columbanus of Bobbio): A Study of Ancient Irish Monastic Life (Dublin: Catholic Truth Society of Ireland, 1915).
- Women of ‘Ninety Eight. (Dublin: M. H. Gill, 1919).
- Daughters of Banba. (Dublin: M. H. Gill, 1922).
- The Poor Clares in Ireland. (A.D. 1629 – A.D. 1929), (Dublin: M.H. Gill, 1929)
- St. Patric. His life and mission by Mrs Thomas Concannon (1932).
- Irish Nuns in Penal Days. (London: Sands & Co., 1931)
- The Curé of La Courneuve: L'Abbé Jean-Édouard Lamy by Senator Helena Concannon (Dublin; M.H. Gill, 1945)
- Poems. (Dublin: M. H. Gill, 1953)
- Blessed Oliver Plunkett: Archbishop of Armagh and Primate of all Ireland, by Mrs. Thomas Concannon, with appendix by Robert C. Simington.(Dublin: Browne & Nolan, 1935).
- The Queen of Ireland: An Historical Account of Ireland's Devotion to the Blessed Virgin (Dublin: M.H. Gill, 1938).
- The Woman of the Piercing Wail (The Lady Nuala O'Donnell). (Dublin: John F. Fowler, 1920).

== Sources ==
- Dictionary of Nineteenth-century Irish Women Poets, pp. 233, Anne Ulry Colman, Kenny's Bookshop, Galway, 1996. ISBN 0-906312-44-2.

Dáil	Election	Deputy (Party)	Deputy (Party)	Deputy (Party)	Deputy (Party)
1st	1918	Eoin MacNeill (SF)	1 seat under 1918 Act		
2nd	1921	Eoin MacNeill (SF)	Ada English (SF)	Michael Hayes (SF)	William Stockley (SF)
3rd	1922	Eoin MacNeill (PT-SF)	William Magennis (Ind.)	Michael Hayes (Note: Michael Hayes served as Ceann Comhairle from 9 September 1922 to 29 January 1932.) (PT-SF)	William Stockley (AT-SF)
4th	1923	Eoin MacNeill (CnaG)	William Magennis (CnaG)	Michael Hayes (CnaG)	3 seats from 1923
4th	1923 by-election	Patrick McGilligan (CnaG)	William Magennis (CnaG)	Michael Hayes (CnaG)	3 seats from 1923
5th	1927 (Jun)	Patrick McGilligan (CnaG)	Arthur Clery (Ind.)	Michael Hayes (CnaG)	3 seats from 1923
6th	1927 (Sep)	Patrick McGilligan (CnaG)	Michael Tierney (CnaG)	Michael Hayes (CnaG)	3 seats from 1923
7th	1932	Patrick McGilligan (CnaG)	Conor Maguire (FF)	Michael Hayes (CnaG)	3 seats from 1923
8th	1933	Patrick McGilligan (CnaG)	Conor Maguire (FF)	Helena Concannon (FF)	3 seats from 1923
8th	1936	Patrick McGilligan (CnaG)	(Vacant)	Helena Concannon (FF)	3 seats from 1923
