= Kings of Uí Díarmata =

Kings of Uí Díarmata from c.971 onwards. There are large temporal gaps where no kings or lords are attested.

- Tadhg of Uí Díarmata, died 971
- Giolla Comáin mac Néill, died 991
- Muirgheas mac Aedh, died 999
- Mac Cú Ceanain, died 1021.
- Muirgeas ua Cú Ceanainn, died 1037
- Aedh Ua Con Ceanainn, died 1067
- Muirgheas Ua Cú Ceannainn, died 1105
- Aedh Ua Con Ceannainn, died 1119
- Donnchadh Ua Con Ceanainn, died 1143
- Teige Ua Con Ceannainn, fl. c. 1152; foster-father of Cathal Crobhdearg Ua Conchobair
- Uada Ua Con Ceanainn, died a cleric, 1167
- Cú Ceanain Ó Con Ceanainn, died 1224
- Donnell Ó Con Ceanainn, died 1316 at the Battle of Athenry
- Aodh Ó Con Ceanainn, fl. 1319
- Cathal mac Davok Ó Con Ceanainn, died 1370
- O Conceanainn, died 1382.
- Ó Conceanainn, died 1389
- Tomas Ó Con Ceanainn, died 1478
- William Ó Con Ceanainn, fl. 1478
- Davok Ó Con Ceanainn, fl. 1478, to Connemara
- Ó Con Ceanainn of Cooloo, fl. 1574
- Melaghlin and Teige Ó Con Ceanainn, joint rulers, fl. 1574
