= Stanley McCandless =

American lighting designer (1897–1967)

- Born: 1897; Chicago, Illinois
- Died: 1967 (aged 69–70); New Haven, Connecticut
- Known for: Lighting design
- Notable work: McCandless method

Stanley Russell McCandless (May 9, 1897 – August 4, 1967) is considered to be the father of modern lighting design. He paved the way for future lighting designers by making contributions to almost all aspects of theatrical lighting, from the engineering of lighting instruments to consultant work, and designing realized theatrical productions. Perhaps most importantly he wrote one of the seminal works on the theory of stage lighting, which continues to influence the technique of most theatrical lighting designers to this day.

== Biography ==
McCandless was born in Chicago, Illinois, the son of Dr. Charles Russell McCandless (1862–1924) and Mary Eliza (Sisson) McCandless (1865–1942). After graduating from the University of Wisconsin-Madison in 1920, he received a degree in architecture from Harvard College in 1923. Work as an architect eventually led him to the career of theatrical lighting consultant. McCandless and his Harvard acquaintance George Pierce Baker, served as some of the first faculty to teach at the Yale School of Drama. The method of lighting the stage McCandless outlined in A Method of Lighting the Stage, known today as the McCandless Method, is still in wide use today.

== Educator ==
During his time at Yale, McCandless published some of the first books to lay out a method and approach to the art of lighting design. In his book A Method of Lighting the Stage (1932), McCandless details his method of lighting design which is based on the idea of breaking the stage down into uniform acting areas and manipulating light in terms of intensity, color, distribution, and control. In the earlier text Syllabus of Stage Lighting (1927), McCandless also outlines his views on the functions of light in the theatre. These functions are broken down into visibility, locale, composition, and mood. Approaching light in this way allows the designer to address the practical aspects of lighting, as well as giving due attention to the more emotional side of the art. These books and others, including A Glossary of Stage Lighting (1926), were born from McCandless’ lectures at Yale, where he taught some of the early greats in the field including Jean Rosenthal and Tharon Musser. McCandless was also one of the first professors to outline the historical development of lighting design. His books are not only practical guides to the art, but they give designers a sense of their legacy and heritage.

== Innovator ==
Like many lighting designers to follow, Stanley McCandless was not only interested in the artistic side of lighting design, but he also contributed to the technical aspect of the art as well. In his early work as a theatrical consultant, McCandless designed specific house lights for the Center Theatre in New York's Radio City. These fixtures incorporated the use of ellipsoidal shaped reflectors, which were later developed into the ellipsoidal reflector spotlight. This lighting fixture has become the staple for theatre lighting inventories in America and England due to its ability to shape light with shutters and gobos or templates.

Stanley McCandless continued to educate and design until he retired from teaching in 1964. His legacy is still felt by many lighting designers today, as his method and approach to the art are still the backbone of many educational theatre programs.

== McCandless method ==
The McCandless method is a particular approach to providing stage lighting, first proposed in his book, A Method of Lighting the Stage, which has been through several editions. The McCandless method is still in wide use today.

In the McCandless method, the actors are meant to be fully front lit but also provided with some "sculpting" of the features. Full lighting is provided by at least two lights from opposite sides, above the plane of the actors by about 45 degrees and approximately 90 degrees apart. These two lights come in from opposite directions. Top lighting may also be used for fill, as may limited footlights. McCandless described these angles as being the diagonals of a cube in the center of the acting area.

However, the key to the McCandless method is that one light of the primary pair is "cool" relative to the other. One may be blue (a cool color, i.e. higher kelvin temperature) and the other amber (a warm color, i.e. lower kelvin temperature). Thus, one fills the shadows left by the other in a way that produces a degree of depth which is striking and recognizable on the stage, similar to stage makeup in the way it exaggerates and clarifies the actors' faces.

This method of pairing a warm lantern with a cool lantern simulates sunrise in an outdoor environment, as in real life, giving the production a naturalistic (notion of realism on stage invented by Constantin Stanislavski) feel, thereby producing intimacy of the play with the audience. This coupled with the depth created, enhances the facial features of the actors, enabling them to convey emotion more effectively than before.

This comparison of warm and cool also enables the lighting designer to shift the balance of the warm and cool lanterns in accordance of what time of day it is. For example, if a scene was set in the middle of the day, the warm and cool lanterns would be equally bright, so the shadows created would be filled equally by warm and cool light, giving the actor's face a balanced look similar to that of standing outside in the middle of the day. However, as it becomes later in the day, the cool lantern would become brighter than the warm lantern, so the light upon the actors face becomes cooler overall, suggesting to the audience that the time has shifted into the evening, without any mention of time in the scene itself.

To be totally realistic in this representation of daylight, four lanterns should be used to cover one area of the stage, in two pairs at 45 degree angles, so on each side of the actor's face both a warm and a cool light would be present. This would enable the lighting designer at midday to switch the warm light from one side of the actors face to the other, simulating the sun passing overhead in real life, enhancing the realism.

Alternatively, this effect can be achieved with two lanterns equipped with scrollers (a device which fits on the end of the lantern capable of holding different colour gels and switching them during the performance) each containing a warm and a cool gel.

A third method, developed before scrollers, was to use three instruments, two on one side and one on the other. Three gel colors were used. The colors in the two lanterns on the one side were picked to be relatively warm and cool in relation to the single color on the other side. For instance colors of pink, blue, and lavender might be chosen. Pink is warmer than lavender and blue is cooler than lavender, so the warm side can be chosen by deciding to use either the pink or the blue lantern. This was also an advantage during the end of a scene or the curtain call on a musical production, where the greatest possible amount of light was often desired and shadows were of little interest. All three lights could be brought to full brightness, producing somewhat unnaturally flat but bright illumination.

Stanley McCandless began devising this system while at Harvard College. He fully developed it following his move to Yale University, which was then near the center of American theatre, in part because many producers of Broadway-bound shows staged opening runs at New Haven's Shubert Theatre in order to assess their wider potential.
