= Tomás Bán Ó Conceanainn =

Irish writer and historian

Tomás Bán Ó Conceanainn (16 November 1870 – 20 April 1961; Thomas Concannon) was an Irish writer and historian.

== Life ==
Ó Conceanainn was born in Inishmaan, a son of Páidín Ó Conceanainn and Anne Ní Fathartaigh. He was educated on the island and at the Patrician national school in Galway. In 1885 he went to the US with his brother, attending Boston College and Liveamore College, California, graduating from Eastman College, New York, with a M.A. in accountancy. He set up practice in Mexico.

Returning to Ireland in 1898 on holiday he became involved with the Gaelic League, so much so that he remained in the country as one of its organisers. On a 1905 journey to the US with Douglas Hyde, they collected twenty thousand dollars. However, they returned it for the relief of San Francisco in the aftermath of the 1906 earthquake. He remained an organiser until 1911.

In 1912 Patrick Pearse attempted to persuade him to recruit backers for Pearse's boys' and girls' bilingual Montessori secondary schools Scoil Éanna and Scoil Íde, on a percentage basis, but he declined; Seán T. O'Kelly took on the work. Concannon's nephew, Brian Seoighe, was a student in Scoil Éanna.

In 1906, he married the writer Helena Walsh. The couple collaborated on a number of books. He retired in 1938, and was awarded an honorary LL.D. by University College Galway. He died in Galway in 1946.

== See also ==
- Concannon Vineyard
- Kings of Uí Díarmata

== Select bibliography ==
- Mion-Chomhradh. Leabhar Cainte Gaedhilge-Bearla, Dublin, 1904
- Seoda na Sean. Cuid I, with Helena Concannon, 1924.
