= John Concannon =

Irish businessman

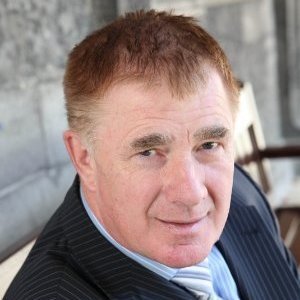
Profile image of John Concannon, CEO of JFC Group

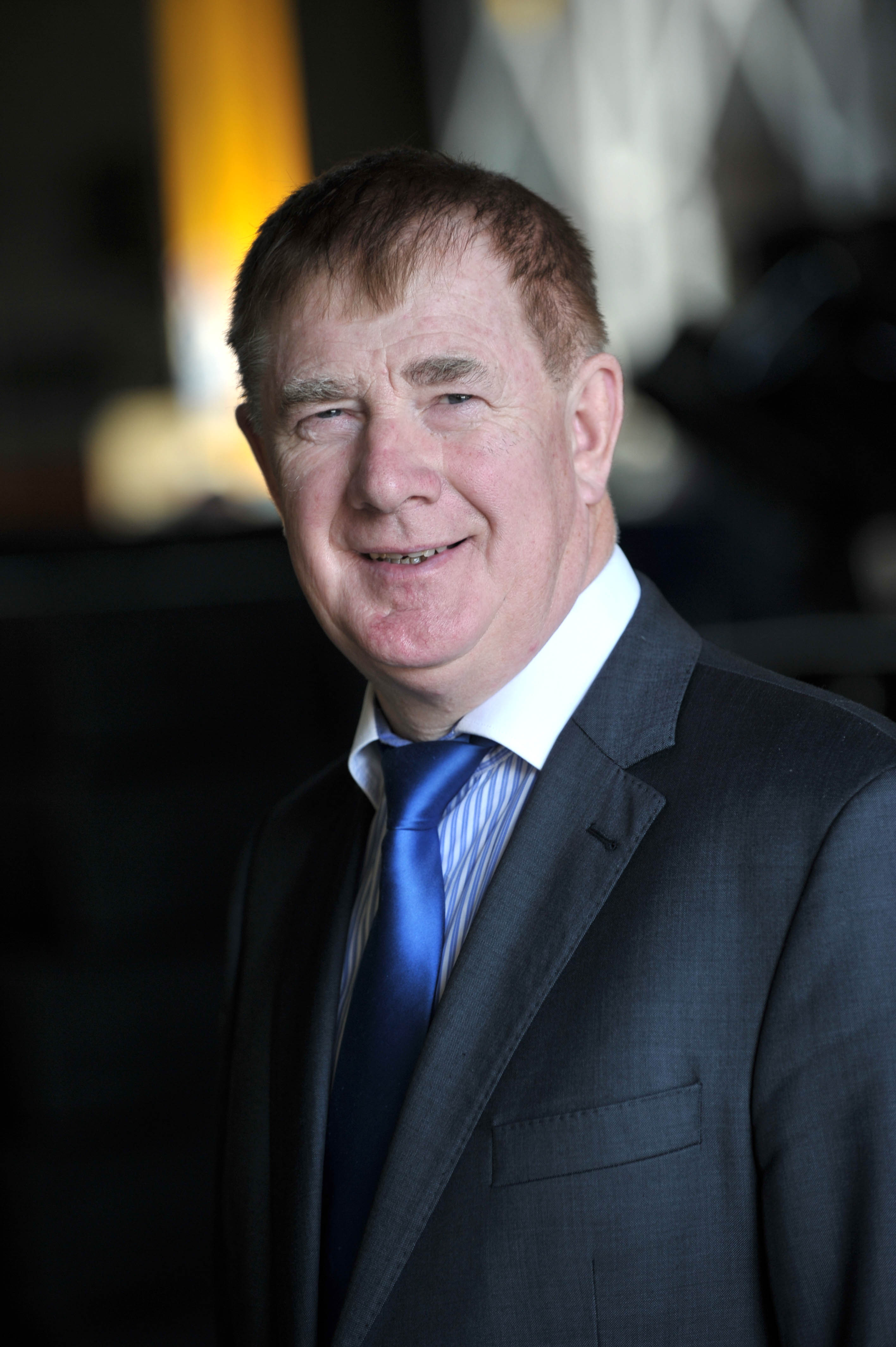
Profile Image of John Concannon, CEO of JFC Group

John Concannon is an Irish businessman, philanthropist, and star of RTÉ's The Secret Millionaire.

A native of Kilconly, Tuam, Concannon is the founder of the JFC Group. He left St. Jarlath's school, Tuam, to work on the family farm. In 1987, he invented the Triple Bucket, a product for feeding calves, which was publicised by Gay Byrne on RTÉ's The Late Late Show that December. The Triple Bucket helped him establish the JFC Group, which over the next thirty-five years helped him become a multi-millionaire, owning factories and sales distribution offices across Ireland, the UK, the Netherlands, Poland, Germany, Belgium, Switzerland and South Africa.

In 2011, he participated in RTÉ's The Secret Millionaire, during which he spent a week in west Dublin subsisting on minimum wage and attempting to determine which charity or organisation in the area most deserved financial support.

Since then, he has supported Pieta House, which gives aid to people who suffer suicidal tendencies, as well as other charitable organisations.

He should not be confused with John Concannon, Director of Market Development at Fáilte Ireland and chairman of Gaisce – The President's Award
