= Cuindles =

Cuindles was the 17th abbot of Clonmacnoise. He died in 724.

Cuindles was a member of the Soghain of Connacht. He had succeeded to his position in 713. In 723, a fire destroyed the monastery buildings.

His memorial slab still exists, bearing the inscription "Or ar Chuindless" ('A prayer for Cuindles').
