= Uí Díarmata =

Early local kingdom of Ireland

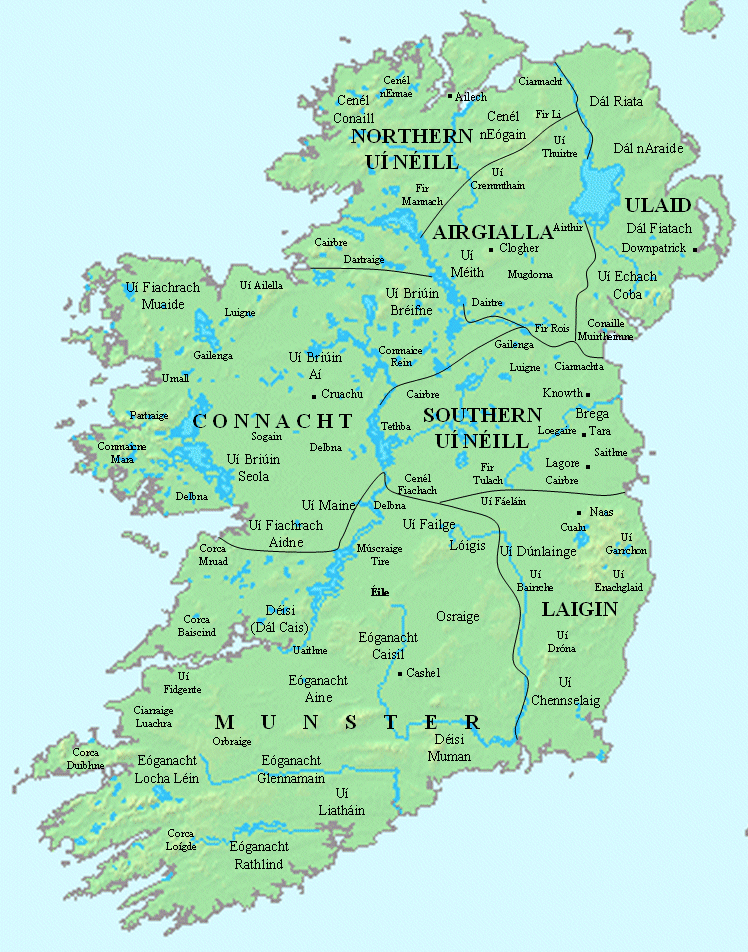
Early peoples and kingdoms of Ireland, c.800

Uí Díarmata was a local kingdom located in what is now north County Galway.

== Origins ==
The ruling dynasty took its name from King Diarmait Finn of Connacht (died 833), and the territory in turn was named after them. It seems to have been created by the Uí Briúin in the ninth century during a wave of expansion under his grandson, Uatu ua Diarmada. Its kings appeared regularly in the annals from 971 onwards

== Concannon ==
By the 11th century its kings had taken the surname Ó Con Cheanain (anglicised "Concannon). The Annals of Connacht state that "Domnall son of Aed O Con Chenainn, king of the Uí Diarmata, and Muirchertach his brother" were killed at the Second Battle of Athenry in 1316. By this stage it had become incorporated into the territory of Clantaie O Dermod (Clann Taidg and Uí Díarmata) ruled by the de Berminghams, Baron Athenry.

Writing at Tuam on 13 September 1838, John O'Donovan wrote "Henry O'Concanon Esq. of Waterloo near Glentaun in the parish of Killascobe in the Barony of Tiaquin enjoys hereditary property, and is the reputed head of this once respectable family." (2009, p. 35)

== Annalistic references ==
From the Annals of the Four Masters:

- M1342.18. Donnell O'Coinleisg, a learned historian, was slain, a short time before Easter, by the Hy-Diarmada.
- M1382.7. The Clann-Maurice made an incursion into Corcomodha, and plundered the people. O'Concannon went in pursuit of the prey, but he was at once killed. Conor Oge Mac Dermot, with his kinsmen, afterwards set out on an excursion against the Clann-Maurice; but a forewarning of their intentions having reached the Clann-Maurice, they had all their forces in readiness to meet them; but the others advanced as far as the town of Brees, despite them, and burned it, both buildings and corn, and slew many persons around it; and Conor and his people afterwards returned, by dint of prowess, without any of them receiving injury.

== See also ==
- Kings of Uí Díarmata
- Concannon Vineyard
- Muirgeas ua Cú Ceanainn (died 1037), King of Uí Díarmata and Chief of the Name.
- Conchobar ua nDiarmata, foster-son of Ruaidri Ua Conchobair (d. 1189).
- Richard Luke Concanen, O.P. (1747–1810), first Bishop of New York (1808–1810).
- Tomás Bán Ó Conceanainn (1870–1946), writer and historian.
- Helena Concannon (née Walsh; 1878–1952), politician, historian, author and scholar.
- Eóin Concannon, died 1954, King of the Claddagh.
- Paddy Concannon, President of the I.T.C.C.A., born 1918, alive 2010.
- John Concannon, Tuam businessman, and star of RTÉ's The Secret Millionaire
- Tomás Ó Con Cheanainn, historian, 1921-2015
