= Empress Wang (Western Xia) =

Empress consort of the Western Xia dynasty
- Tenure: 1139 or 1140–1167 or 1168
- Successor: Empress Luo
- Emperor: Emperor Renzong of Western Xia
- Died: December 1167 or January 1168; Xingqing Prefecture, Western Xia

Empress Wang (Chinese: 罔皇后, died December 1167 or January 1168) was the first empress of Emperor Renzong of Western Xia. She was from an aristocratic Tangut family.

She was made the empress in December 1139 or 1140. (The month is given as December 1139 or January 1140 in History of Song and February or March 1140 in Xixia Shushi).

It was said that Empress Wang was well-read and admired the customs of the Han people, and that Emperor Renzong made her empress due to her seemliness. During her tenure, she disciplined the emperor's harem so that rules were always followed.

On a hunting trip at the Helan Mountains in 1155, Emperor Renzong fell from his horse and injured himself. Enraged, he wanted to have the road builders killed, but an official named Ahua (阿華) stopped and admonished him. Upon learning this after their return, Empress Wang rewarded Ahua with silver coins to encourage more ministers to speak honestly.

Empress Wang died in the winter of 1167–1168. On her deathbed, she told the emperor to respect and honor his ministers and pay more attention to state affairs.
