= Emperor Renzong of Western Xia =

Emperor of Western Xia from 1139 to 1193

Emperor Renzong of Western Xia 西夏仁宗

Emperor of the Western Xia dynasty
- Reign: 1 July 1139 – 16 October 1193
- Predecessor: Emperor Chongzong
- Successor: Emperor Huanzong
- Born: 1124
- Died: 16 October 1193 (aged 68–69)
- Burial: Shouling Mausoleum (壽陵, Tangut: 𘗽𗳇; the No. 7 tomb of Western Xia mausoleums)
- Spouse: Empress Wang
Names
- Weiming Renxiao (嵬名仁孝); Li Renxiao (李仁孝)
Era dates
- Daqing (大慶, 𘜶𘅝): 1140–1143; Renqing (人慶, 𗸦𘅝): 1144–1148; Tiansheng (天盛, 𘓺𘃸): 1149–1169; Qianyou (乾祐, 𘀗𘑨): 1170–1193
Regnal name
- Emperor Fengtian Xiandao Guangyao Wuxuan Wenshen Mourui Zhiyi Quxie Dunmu Yigong (奉天顯道光耀武宣文神謀睿制義去邪惇睦懿恭皇帝 = 𘀗𗖵𗵘𗏴𘟫𗜓𘝞𗪛𗼈𗤱𗼃𘄡𗧘𗍷𗹏𗷰𘌅𗖠𗤓𗴢𘓺𘋨); Emperor Fengtian Xiandao Yaowu Xuanwen Shengrui Zhidun Muyi Gong (奉天顯道耀武宣文聖睿智惇睦懿恭皇帝); Emperor Tianli Zhida Xiaozhi Jingguang Xuanxie Quzhong Ruyong Ping (天力治大孝智淨廣宣邪去忠入永平皇帝); Emperor Renzun Shengde (仁尊聖德皇帝); Tangut style: Emperor of the Defending Castle (𗓑𗍁𘓺𘋨) (short) 𗓑𗍁𗼈𗣼𗫡𗤓𘓺𘋨 (full) (Note: According to the Tangut inscription "𗴂𗹭𗂧𘜶𗓑𗍁𗼈𗣼𗫡𗤓𘓺𘋨𘗽𗳇𘋼𘝞" inscribed in seal script characters on fragments of a broken stele found at his mausoleum.)
Posthumous name
- Emperor Shengde (聖德皇帝, 𗼈𗣼𘓺𘋨)
Temple name
- Renzong (仁宗)
- Father: Emperor Chongzong

Emperor Renzong of Western Xia (1124 – 16 October 1193), born Li Renxiao (Chinese: 李仁孝), was the fifth emperor of the Tangut-led Western Xia dynasty of China. His reign from 1139 to 1193 was the longest among all Western Xia emperors.

Li Renxiao was the eldest son of the Emperor Chongzong, and succeeded him at the age of sixteen. After ascending into the throne, Renzong made friendly overtures to the Jin dynasty. In domestic politics, Renzong created many schools and used examinations to choose his officials. He respected Confucianism, and built many temples worshipping Confucius. During the era of Tiansheng, Renzong hired a Tibetan lama as a religious advisor and printed many copies of Buddhist teachings.

In 1170, Renzong discovered a plot to kill him. He executed the generals who were behind the plot. As a result, Renzong distrusted his army generals and the army began to fall into incompetence. During his later years, Western Xia began to fight wars against various enemies.

Renzong's reign was the peak of Western Xia Dynasty. Many tribes to the north and west became vassal states of Western Xia, and Renzong's focus on internal politics allowed the central government to be more efficient. His reign coincides with the peak of the Southern Song and the Jin Dynasties, and there were relatively few conflicts between these three countries.

He died in 1193 having reigned for over half a century like his father before him.

== Family ==
Consorts and issue:

- Empress, of the Wang clan (d. 1167/1168)
- Empress Zhangxianqinci, of the Luo clan (章獻欽慈皇后)
  - Li Chunyou, Emperor Huanzong (西夏桓宗 李純祐; 1177 – 1206), 1st son

== Notes ==
Regnal titles
Preceded by Emperor Chóngzōng	Emperor of the Western Xia Dynasty; 1139–1193	Succeeded by Emperor Huánzōng
