= Western Xia =

Dynasty in northwest China (1038–1227)

Great Xia 大夏 (白高大夏國) (大白高國)
- 1038–1227 AD
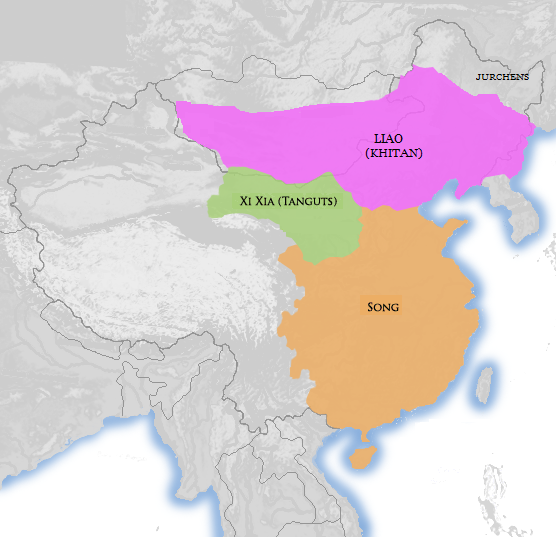
- Extent of Western Xia (green) in 1111 over modern borders

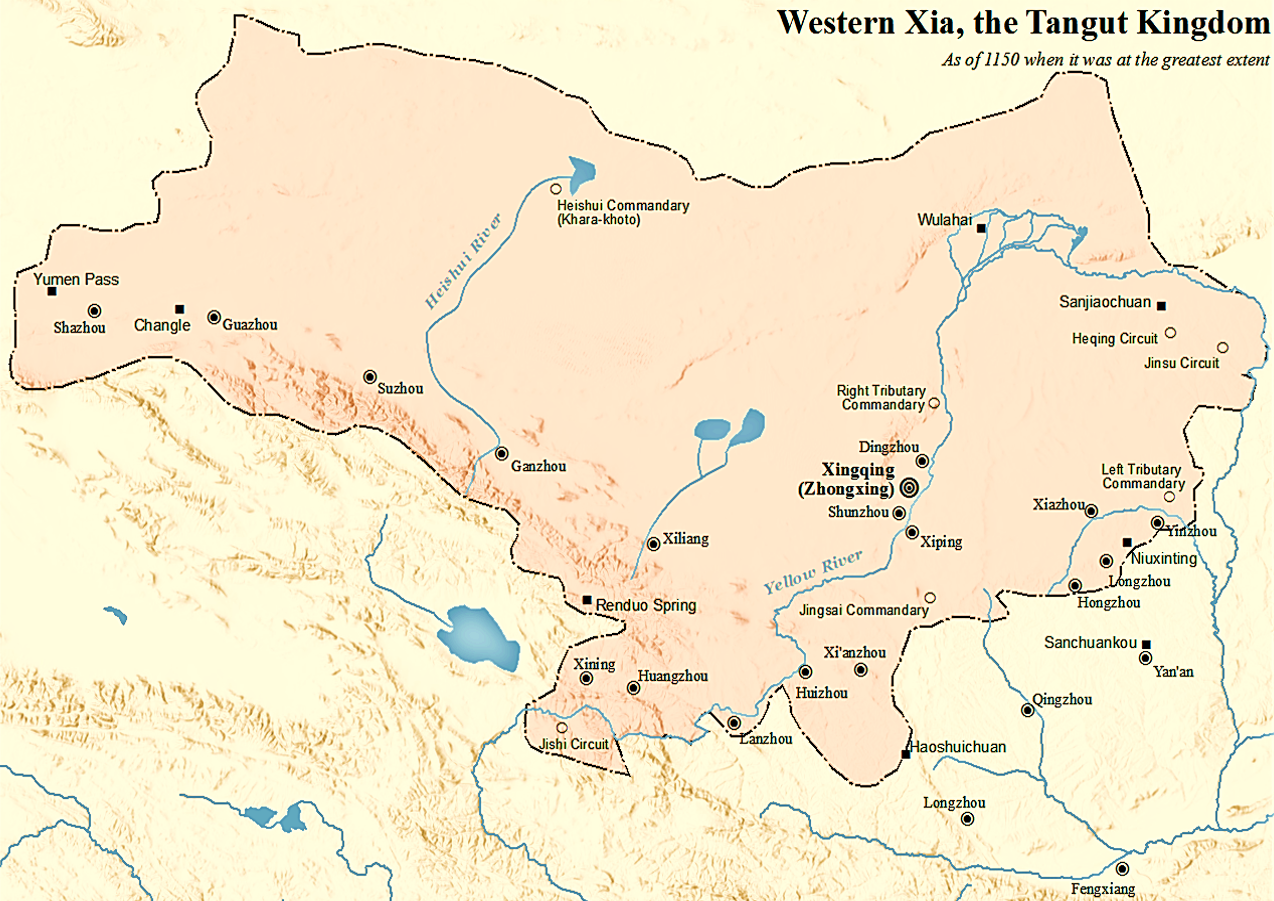
- Western Xia in 1150
- Capital: Xingqing (modern Yinchuan)
- Common languages: Tangut; Chinese
- Religion: Buddhism; Taoism; Confucianism; Chinese folk religion
- Government: Monarchy
- Emperor
  - 1038–1048: Emperor Jingzong
  - 1139–1193: Emperor Renzong
  - 1226–1227: Li Xian (final)
- Historical era: Post-classical history
  - Rebellion by Li Jiqian against the Song dynasty: 984
  - Dynasty established by Emperor Jingzong: 1038
  - Subjugation by the Mongol Empire: 1210
  - Destruction by the Mongol Empire: 1227 AD

Area
- 1100 est.: 1,000,000 km^{2} (390,000 sq mi)

Population
  - Peak: 3,000,000
- Currency: Barter, copper coins See Western Xia coinage
Preceded by
Dingnan Jiedushi
Xiliangfu
Guiyi Circuit
Gansu Uyghur Kingdom
Liao dynasty
Song dynasty
Succeeded by
Mongol Empire

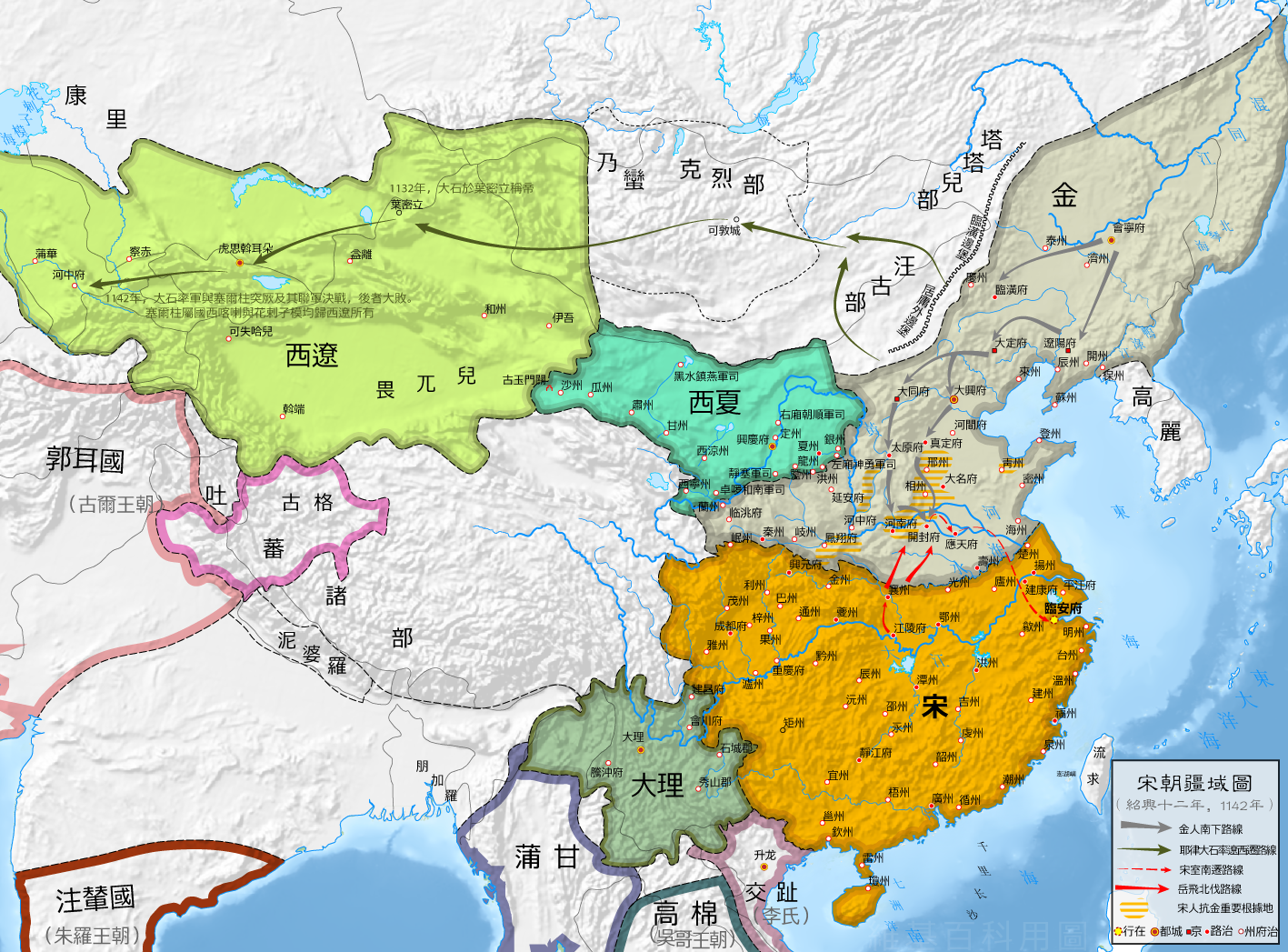
China in AD 1142: Southern Song Jin dynasty Western Xia Western Liao (also known as Qara Khitai) Dali

The Western Xia or the Xi Xia (Chinese: 西夏; pinyin: Xī Xià; Wade–Giles: Hsi^{1} Hsia^{4}), officially the Kingdom of the Great Xia of the White and Lofty (Tangut: 𗴂𗹭𘜶𗴲𗂧) or Great Xia (大夏; Dà Xià; Ta^{4} Hsia^{4}), also known as the Tangut Empire, was a Tangut-led imperial dynasty of China that existed from 1038 to 1227 AD. At its peak, the dynasty ruled over 1,000,000 square kilometres (390,000 square miles) of modern-day north-central China.

The capital of the Western Xia was Xingqing, now Yinchuan; another major Xia city and archaeological site is Khara-Khoto. The Western Xia was annihilated by the Mongols in 1227 AD. Most of its written records and architecture were destroyed, and the origins and history of the empire remained obscure until Chinese and Western research in the 20th-century. Today the Tangut language and its unique script are extinct; only fragments of Tangut literature remain.

The Western Xia occupied the area around the Hexi Corridor, a stretch of the Silk Road, the most important trade route between northern China and Central Asia. They made significant achievements in literature, art, music, and architecture, which was characterized as "shining and sparkling". Their extensive stance among the other empires of the Liao, Song, and Jin was attributable to their effective military organizations that integrated cavalry, chariots, archery, shields, artillery (cannons carried on the back of camels), and amphibious troops for combat on land and water.

== Name ==
=== State name ===
The full title of the Western Xia as named by their own state means, word for word, 'white', 'high', 'kingdom', 'great' (𗴂𗹭𗂧𘜶, reconstructed as /*phiow¹-bjij²-lhjij-lhjij²/), or 'white', 'high', 'great', 'summer', 'kingdom' ( 𗴂𗹭𘜶𗴲𗂧). K.B. Kepping translates this as the "Great State of White and High". A corresponding Chinese name (白高大夏國, "White High Great Xia State") was also used. Chinese and Japanese scholars commonly interpret the first two words as "upper reaches of the White River", which was possibly referring to the Yellow River. Kepping proposed the translation "the Kingdom of the Great Xia of the White and Lofty", and suggested that the name refers to a peak in the Helan Mountains named the "White and Lofty Mother". During the Western Xia period, the only Tangut language name used was the "Great State of White and High", while Chinese language sources in Western Xia used both the name Xia and the "White High Great Xia State". After the Western Xia was conquered by the Mongol Empire in 1227, Tangut language sources also started using the name Xia in addition to their original Tangut name.

"Western Xia" or "Xi Xia" is a later historiographical term based on the state's Chinese name. "Western" refers to its location to the west of the Liao (916–1125) and Jin (1115–1234) dynasties, as well as the Song. "Xia" (pointing to the Xia dynasty) is a historical name for the region that originated from the 5th-century Hu Xia dynasty. It was used from the Ming dynasty onward and is the standard name in contemporary Chinese scholarship.

Another name the Tanguts used for their state was "State of Ten Thousand Secrets" (/khjɨ-dwuu-lhjij/, 萬祕國).

=== Ethnonym ===
The region was known to the Tanguts and Tibetans as Minyak (reconstructed Tangut pronunciation: /mjɨ-njaa/). The Tanguts were called Mianyao or Miyao (彌藥) by the Chinese, mi-nyag (མི་ཉག་) by the Tibetans, and Mi-niah or Mi by the Tanguts themselves. The name Tangut (Old Turkic: 𐱃𐰭𐰆𐱃, romanized: Taŋut) first appeared in the Orkhon inscriptions dated to 732-735, which is transcribed in Chinese as Tangwu or Tangute (Tangghut (Tangɣud) in Mongolian). Various forms of Tangut were used as a common name for certain tribes in the Amdo-Kokonor-Gansu region until the 19th century. The name Tangut was transmitted to Western explorers and writers, who passed on the term, making it the most common name in European, American, and Japanese scholarship.

== History ==
Tangut officials

=== Origins ===
The Tanguts originally came from the Qinghai-Sichuan-Tibet region, whose home originally was in the highlands of western Sichuan. According to Chinese records, which called them the Dangxiang, the Tanguts were descended from the Western Qiang people, and occupied the steppes around Qinghai Lake and the mountains to its south.

In 608, the Tanguts helped the Sui dynasty defeat the Tuyuhun, however they were betrayed by the Sui forces, who took the chance to loot the Tanguts. In 635, they were requested to serve as guides for Emperor Taizong's campaign against Tuyuhun, but the Tang forces double crossed them in a surprise attack and seized thousands of livestock. In retaliation, the Tanguts attacked the Tang and killed thousands of their soldiers.

By the 650s, the Tanguts had left their homeland to escape pressure from the Tibetans and migrated eastward, to what are now parts of Shanxi and Shaanxi. In 584-5 Tuoba Ningzong led the first group of Tanguts to submit to the Sui. In 628-629 another group under the leadership of Xifeng Bulai surrendered to the Tang. After the Tuyuhun were defeated in 635, the Tanguts under Tuoba Chici also surrendered. The 340,000 Tanguts were divided into 32 jimi prefectures under the control of Tangut chieftains appointed as prefects. Another wave of Tanguts entered Tang territory in 692, adding as many as 200,000 persons to the population in Lingzhou and Xiazhou. In 721–722, Tuoba Sitai, a descendant of Tuoba Chici, aided the Tang in putting down a Sogdian-led revolt in Shuofang. By the time of the An Lushan Rebellion in the 750s, the Tanguts had become the primary local power in the Ordos region in northern Shaanxi. In the 760s, the military commander, Ashina Sijian, harassed six Tangut tribes and took their camels and horses. The Tanguts fled west across the Yellow River and started working for the Tibetans as guides on raiding expeditions. In 764, the Tanguts joined the Tibetans and Uyghurs in supporting the Tang rebel Pugu Huaien. After the Tang reasserted their authority, a descendant of Tuoba Chici, Tuoba Chaoguang, was put in charge of the loyal Tanguts. The Yeli, Bali, and Bozhou clans continued to side with the Tibetans, however the Tanguts also came under Tibetan predation, and frontier settlements continued switching between Tang and Tibetan control for many years. In 806, the Acting Minister of Works, Du You, admitted that they treated the Tanguts badly:

In recent years, corrupt frontier generals have repeatedly harassed and mistreated [the Tanguts]. Some profited from [unfair trading in] their fine horses; some seized their sons and daughters. Some accepted their local products as bribes, and some imposed corvée on them. Having suffered so much hardship, the Tanguts rebelled and fled. They either sent envoys to contact the Uighurs or cooperated with the Tibetans to raid our borders. These are the consequences of [Tang frontier generals’ wrong] deeds. We must discipline them.

— Du You

In 814 the Tang appointed a Commissioner for Pacifying the Tanguts to Youzhou (modern Otog Banner), however this did not resolve the Tangut problem. In 820 the Tanguts were subjected to the tyranny of a local governor, Tian Jin. They retaliated by joining the Tibetans in raids on Tang garrisons. Sporadic conflict with the Tanguts lasted until the 840s when they rose in open revolt against the Tang, but the rebellion was suppressed. Eventually the Tang court was able to mollify the Tanguts by admonishing their frontier generals and replacing them with more disciplined ones. The Tanguts also fought against the Uyghurs after the collapse of the Uyghur Khaganate because they both wanted to monopolize the horse trade which passed through Lingzhou.

==== Dingnan Jiedushi ====
In 873, the senior Tangut leader at Xiazhou, Tuoba Sigong, occupied Youzhou and declared himself prefect. When Chang'an fell to Huang Chao in 880, Sigong led a Chinese-Tangut army to assist Tang forces in driving out the rebels. For his service, he was granted in 881 control of Xiazhou, Youzhou, Suizhou, Yinzhou, and later also Jingbian. Together the territory was called Dingnan Jiedushi, also known as Xiasui, centered on modern Yulin, Shaanxi. After the Huang Chao rebellion's defeat in 883, Sigong was granted the dynastic surname Li and enfeoffed as "Duke of Xia". In 878, the Shatuo chieftain Li Guochang attacked the Tanguts but was repelled by a Tuyuhun intervention.

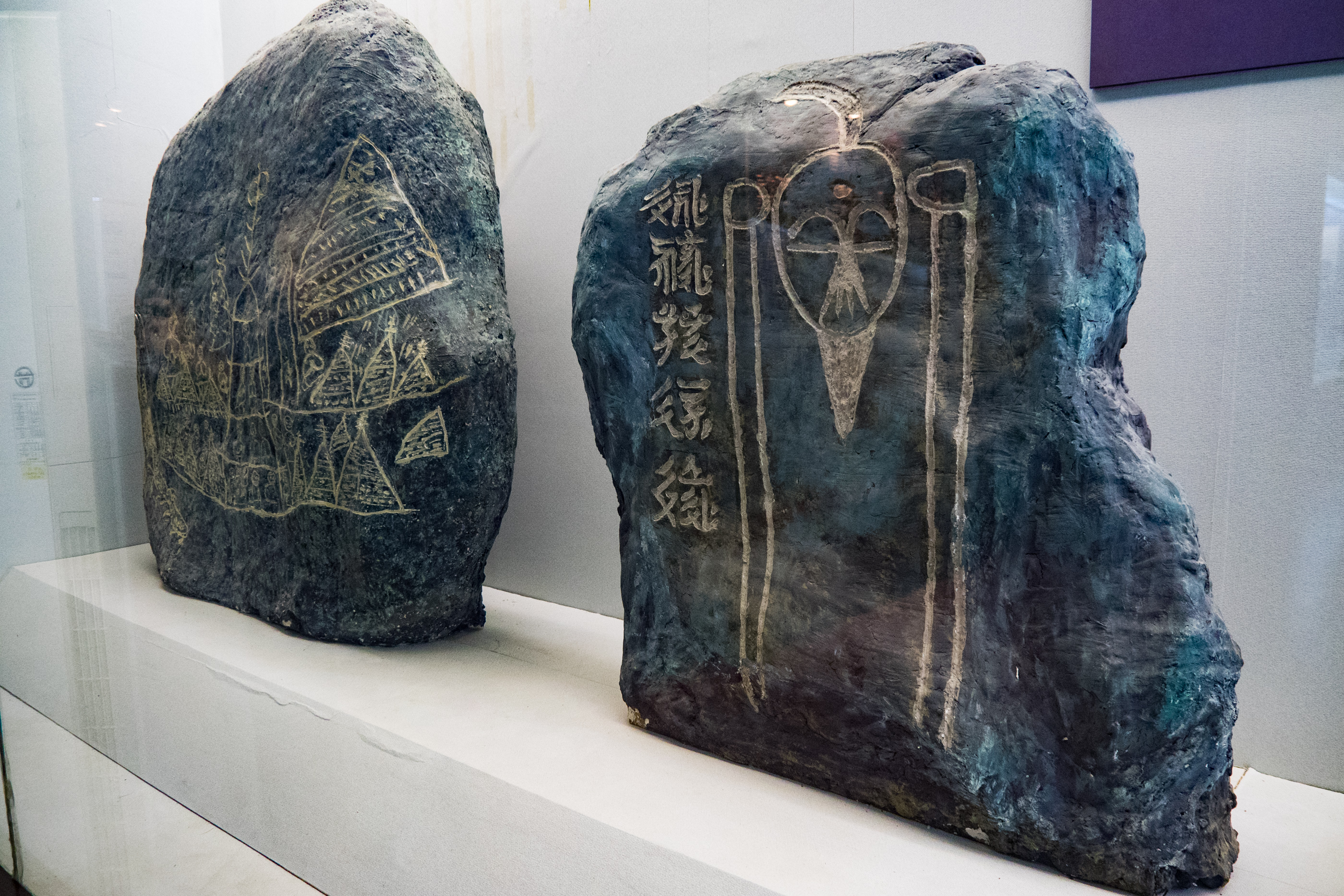
Xixia stone inscriptions

Sigong died in 886 and was succeeded by his brother Sijian. In 905 Li Keyong's independent regime allied with the Khitans, which pushed the Tanguts into an alliance with Later Liang, which awarded the Dingnan rulers with honorary titles. Sijian died in 908 and was succeeded by his adopted son Yichang, who was murdered by his officer Gao Zongyi in 909. Gao Zongyi was himself murdered by soldiers of Dingnan and was replaced by Yichang's uncle, Renfu, who was a popular officer in the army. In 910 Dingnan came under a monthlong siege by the forces of Qi and Jin but was able to repel the invasion with the aid of Later Liang. In 922 Renfu sent 500 horses to Luoyang, perhaps to aid the Later Liang in fighting the Shatuo. In 924 Renfu was enfeoffed as "Prince of Shuofang" by Later Tang. When Renfu died in 933, Later Tang tried to replace his son, Yichao, with a Sogdian governor, An Congjin. An Congjin besieged Xiazhou with 50,000 soldiers, but the Tanguts mounted a successful defensive by rallying the tribes and stripping the countryside of any resources. The Later Tang army was forced to retreat after three months. Despite Later Tang aggression, Yichao made peace with them by sending 50 horses as an offering.

Yichao died in 935 and was succeeded by his brother Yixing. Yixing discovered a plot by his brother, Yimin, to overthrow him in 943. Yimin fled to Chinese territory, but was returned to Xiazhou for execution. Over 200 clan members were implicated in the plot, resulting in a purge of the core ranks. Yimin's post was taken by a loyal official, Renyu. Not long afterward, Renyu was killed by the Yemu Qiang, who departed for Chinese territory. In 944 Yixing may have attacked the Liao dynasty on behalf of the Later Jin. The sources are not clear on the event. In 948 Yixing requested permission to cross the border and attack the Yemu Qiang but was refused. Instead Yixing attacked a neighboring circuit under encouragement from the rebel Li Shouzhen, but retreated upon encountering an imperial force. In 952 the Yeji people north of Qingzhou rebelled, causing the Tanguts significant difficulty. Honorary titles were given out by the Later Han to appease local commanders, including Yixing. In 960 Dingnan came under attack by Northern Han and successfully repelled invading forces. In 962 Yixing offered horses as tribute to the Song dynasty. Yixing died in 967 and was succeeded by his son, Kerui.

==== Jiqian's foundation ====
Kerui died in 978 and was succeeded by Jiyun. Jiyun ruled for only a year before dying in 980. His son was still an infant, so Jiyun's brother, Jipeng, assumed leadership. Jipeng did not go through the traditional channel of acquiring consent from the elders, which caused dissent among the Tangut elites. The Tangut prefect of Suizhou challenged Jipeng's succession. In 982 Jipeng fled to the Song court and surrendered control of Dingnan Jiedushi. His brother or cousin, Jiqian, did not agree to this and refused to submit to Song administration. Jiqian led a group of bandit holdouts and resisted Song control. In 984, the Song attacked his camp and captured his mother and wife, but he narrowly escaped. He rebounded from this defeat by capturing Yinzhou the next year. Along with Yinzhou, Jiqian captured large amounts of supply, allowing him to increase his following. In 986, Jiqian began paying tribute to the Liao dynasty and in 989, Jiqian married into Khitan nobility. In 990, Jiqian accepted the title "King of the Xia State" (夏國王) from the Liao emperor. Jiqian also made symbolic obeisance to the Song, but the Song remained unconvinced of his intentions. Jipeng was sent by the Song to destroy Jiqian, but he was defeated in battle on 6 May 994, and fled back to Xiazhou. Jiqian sent tribute on 9 September as well as his younger brother on 1 October to the Song court. Emperor Taizong of Song was receptive of these gestures, but Jiqian returned to raiding Song territory the next year. In April 996, Taizong sent troops to suppress Jiqian, who raided Lingzhou in May and again in November 997. For a brief period after 998, Jiqian accepted Song suzerainty, until the fall of 1001 when he began raiding again. Jiqian died on 6 January 1004 from an arrow wound. His son and successor, Deming, proved to be more amicable towards the Song than his predecessor.

=== Jingzong (1038–1048) ===
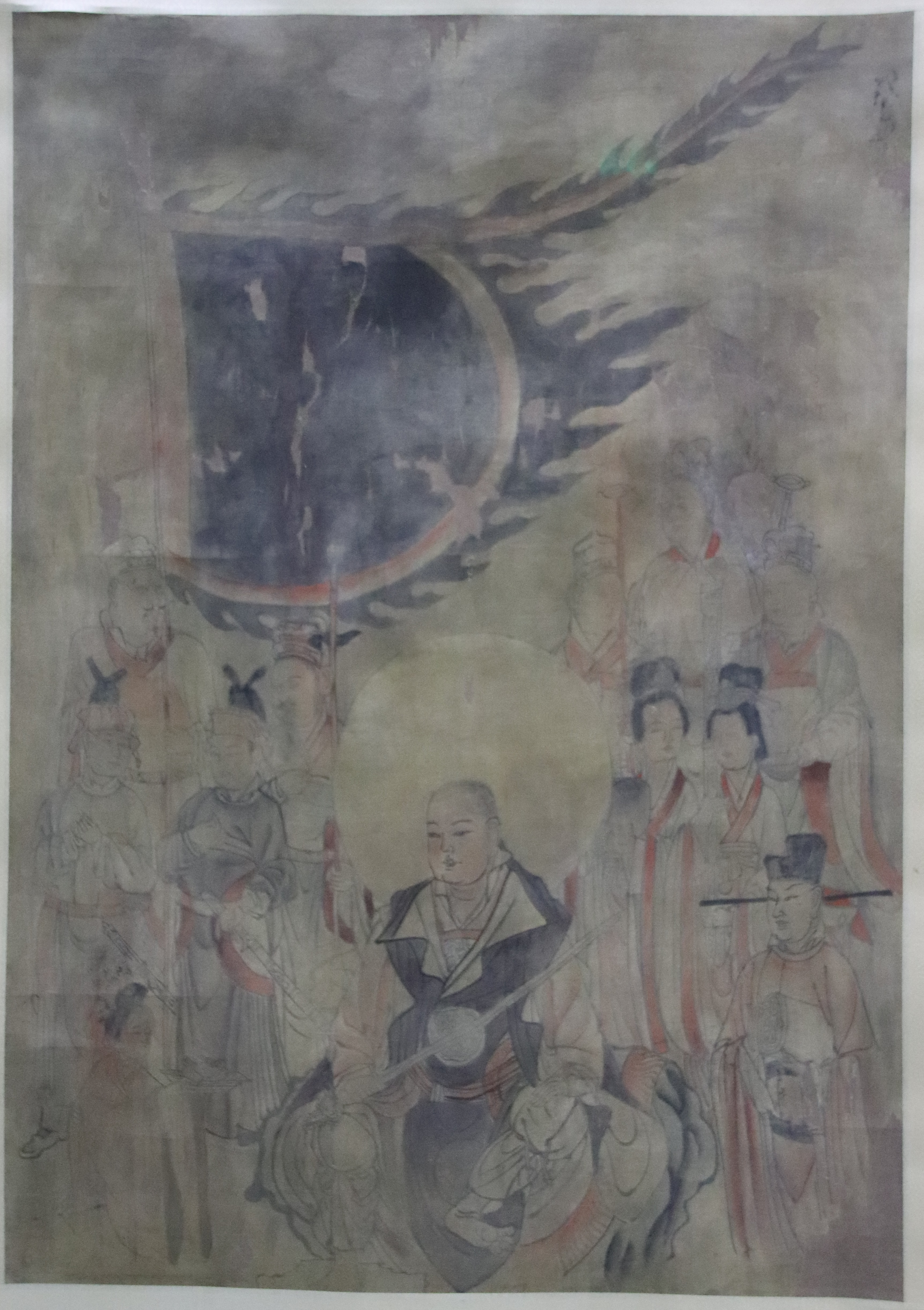
Western Xia painting on silk depicting the Daoist deity Emperor Xuanwu, discovered in the Hongfo Pagoda in 1990

Deming sent tribute missions to both the Liao dynasty and the Song dynasty. At the same time he expanded Tangut territory to the west. In 1028, he sent his son Yuanhao to conquer the Ganzhou Uyghur Kingdom. Two years later the Guiyi Circuit surrendered to the Tanguts. Yuanhao invaded the Qinghai region as well but was repelled by the newly risen Tibetan kingdom of Tsongkha. In 1032, Yuanhao annexed the Tibetan confederation of Xiliangfu, and soon after his father died, leaving him ruler of the Tangut state.

Upon his father's death, Yuanhao adopted the Tangut surname of Weiming (Tangut: Nweimi) for his clan. He levied all able bodied men between 15 and 60 years of age, providing him with a 150,000 strong army. By 1036, he had annexed both the Ganzhou Uyghur Kingdom and the Guiyi Circuit to his west. In the same year, the Tangut script was disseminated for use in the Tangut government and translations of Chinese and Tibetan works began at once. The script's creation is attributed to Yeli Renrong and work on it likely began during the reign of Deming.

In 1038, Yuanhao declared himself emperor (wu zu or Blue Son of Heaven), posthumously Emperor Jingzong of Western Xia, of the Great Xia with his capital at Xingqing in modern Yinchuan. Jingzong expanded the bureaucratic apparatus mirroring Chinese institutional practices. A Secretariat (Zhongshu sheng), Bureau of Military Affairs (Shumi yuan), Finance Office (San si), Censorate (Yushi tai), and 16 bureaus (shiliu si) under the supervision of a chancellor (shangshu ling) were created. Jingzong enacted a head shaving decree that ordered all his countrymen to shave the top of their heads so that if within three days, someone had not followed his order, they were allowed to be killed.

In response, the Song dynasty offered to bestow ranks on the Tanguts, which Jingzong rejected. The Song then cut off border trade and put a bounty on his head. The Xia's chief military leader, Weiming Shanyu, also fled to seek asylum with the Song, however he was executed at Youzhou. What ensued was a prolonged war with the Song dynasty which resulted in several victories at great cost to the Xia economy.

Beyond establishing a Chinese-style central government for the militarized kingdom (which included sixteen bureaus), he also designated eighteen military control commissions spread among five military zones: (1) 70,000 soldiers to deal with the Liao, (2) 50,000 assigned to deal with Huan, Qing, Zhenrong, and Yuan prefectures, (3) 50,000 opposite Fuyan circuit and Lin and Fu[1] prefectures, (4) 30,000 to deal with the Xifan and Huige to the west, and (5) 50,000 in the eastern skirtlands of Helan Mountains, 50,000 at Ling, and 70,000 spread between Xing prefecture and Xingqing fu, or superior prefecture. Altogether Yuanhao had as many as 370,000 men under arms. These were mounted forces, which had been stretched thin by hard warfare and probably excessive use of non-warrior horsemen impressed to fill the army. He maintained a six-unit bodyguard of 5,000 and his elite cavalry force, Iron Cavalry (tieqi) of 3,000. It was a fearful concentration of military might overlaying a relatively shallow economic base.

— Michael C. McGrath

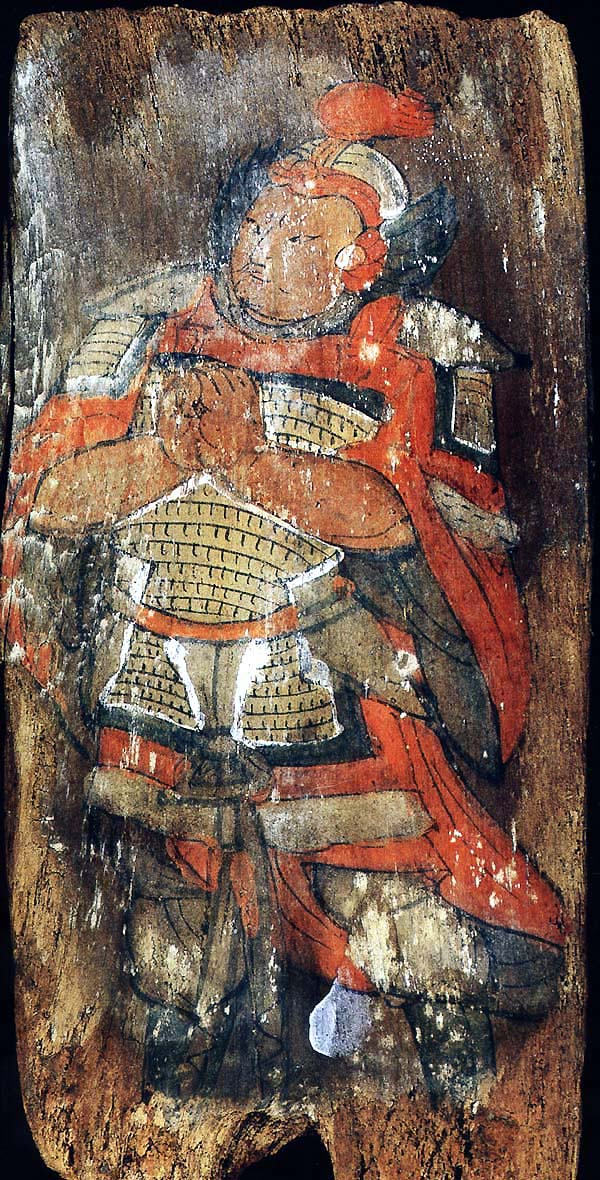
Painting of a warrior from a late Western Xia tomb in Gansu

In the winter of 1039–1040, Jingzong laid siege to Yanzhou (now Yan'an) with over 100,000 troops. The prefect of Yanzhou, Fan Yong, gave contradictory orders to his military deputy, Liu Ping, making him move his forces (9,000) in random directions until they were defeated by Xia forces (50,000) at Sanchuan Pass. Liu Ping was taken captive. Despite the defenders' mediocre performance, Jingzong was forced to lift the siege and retreat to a ring of forts overlooking Yanzhou, when heavy winter snows set in. A Song army of 30,000 returned later that winter under the command of Ren Fu. They were ambushed at Haoshuichuan and annihilated. Despite such victories, Jingzong failed to make any headway against Song fortifications, garrisoned by 200,000 troops on rotation from the capital, and remained unable to seize any territory. In 1042, Jingzong advanced south and surrounded the fort of Dingchuan. The defending commander Ge Huaimin lost his nerve and decided to run, abandoning his troops to be slaughtered. Again, Jingzong failed to gain significant territory. Half his soldiers had died from attrition and after two years, Xia could no longer support his military endeavors. Tangut forces began suffering small defeats, being turned back by Song forces at Weizhou and Linzhou.

By 1043, there were several hundred thousand trained local archer and crossbow militiamen in Shaanxi, and their archery skills were now generally effective. Crucial to defense (or offense) was the use of local non-Chinese allies to screen Song from the monetary costs and social costs of full-scale war. By mid-1042, the accumulated efforts of men like Fan Zhongyan and others to entice the fan to settle in the in-between areas were paying off. The fan generally and the Qiang specifically were siding with the Song much more than with the Xia at this point. By now, also, there were enough forts and walled cities to limit Yuanhao’s maneuverability and to improve mutual support against him.

— Michael C. McGrath

The Liao dynasty took advantage of the Song's dire predicaments by increasing annual tribute payments by 100,000 units of silk and silver (each). The Song appealed to the Liao for help, and as a result, Emperor Xingzong of Liao invaded Western Xia with a force of 100,000 in 1044. Liao forces enjoyed an initial victory but failed to take the Xia capital and were brutally mauled by Jingzong's defenders. According to Song spies, there was a succession of carts bearing Liao dead across the desert. Having exhausted his resources, Jingzong made peace with the Song, who recognized him as the ruler of Xia lands and agreed to pay an annual tribute of 250,000 units of silk, silver, and tea.

Toward the end of the war, Jingzong took the intended bride of his son, Lady Moyi, as his concubine. Jingzong's designated heir, Ninglingge, was the son of the Yeli empress, whose uncle Yeli Wangrong was concerned about the development. Ninglingge was thus arranged to marry the daughter of Wangrong, who planned to kill the emperor on the eve of the wedding. The plot leaked and Wangrong as well as four other Yeli conspirators were executed. The Yeli empress was demoted and Lady Moyi was installed in her place. Another concubine, Lady Mocang, bore the emperor a male child in 1047, named Liangzuo, who was raised by his uncle, Mocang Epang. The disinherited heir apparent stabbed Jingzong in the nose and fled to Mocang Epang's residence where he was arrested and executed. Jingzong died the next day on 19 January 1048 at the age of 44.

=== Yizong (1048–1068) ===
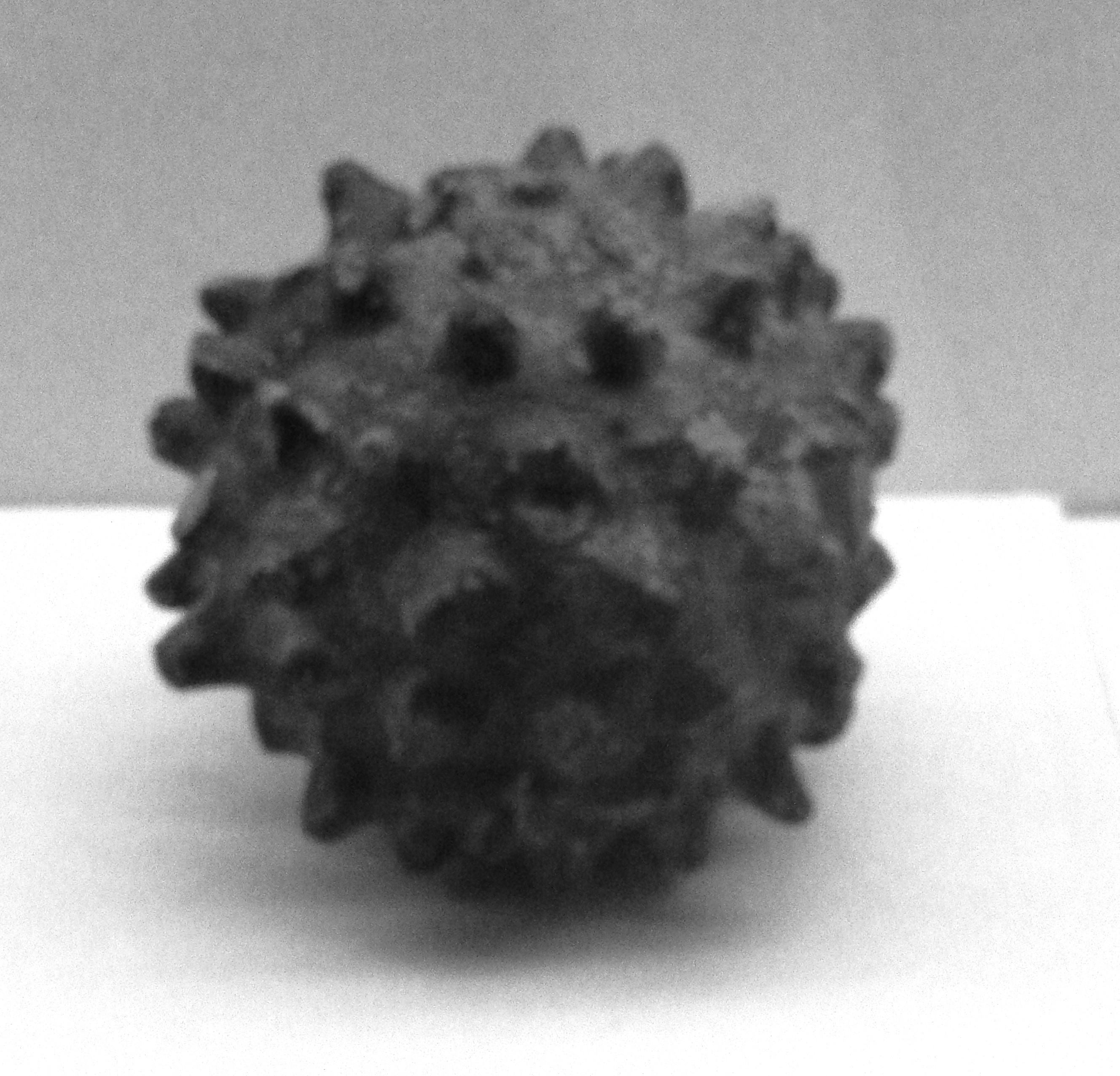
Western Xia explosive caltrop

After Emperor Jingzong of Western Xia died in 1048, a council of elders selected his cousin as the new ruler. Mocang Epang objected on grounds of primogeniture and put forth his nephew, the son of Jingzong and Lady Mocang, as candidate. No dissent was forthcoming, so the two-year-old Liangzuo became emperor, posthumously known as Emperor Yizong of Western Xia.

During Yizong's childhood, the Mocang empress dowager and her brother, Mocang Epang, ruled as regents. In 1049 and 1050, the Liao dynasty invaded Xia territory, raided Liangzhou, and captured one of the wives of the former emperor, Jingzong. However the Liao Khitans suffered severe losses during the invasion and accepted the empress dowager's offer to normalize relations.

In 1050, the empress dowager commemorated the construction of a Buddhist temple named Chengtian Temple (Received from Heaven Temple) for the purpose of enshrining Buddhist relics. The empress dowager took the opportunity to assert her legitimacy as regent by utilizing Chinese modes of rhetoric, suggesting that she had an audience familiar with Chinese culture. According to a Qing dynasty text (Xi Xia shushi), the empress dowager received the Tripitaka from the Song dynasty and raised tens of thousands of soldiers to build the temple in Xingqing. Buddhist Uyghur monks were present and gave lectures on the sutras.

In 1056 the empress dowager was assassinated by her brother, Epang, for opposing his desire to colonize territory claimed by the Song. The Mocang empress dowager was returning from a hunting expedition in the Helan Mountains when she was ambushed and killed by a group of mounted tribesmen. Subsequently, Epang took over as regent and married his daughter to Yizong, who was at the time nine years old. Under Epang's regency, the Xia started encroaching upon Song lands in 1057. In response, the Song shut down border markets. Yet soon after the Tanguts requested a copy of the Tripitaka from the Song, which the Song agreed to in early 1058.

In 1061, Yizong befriended the wife of Epang's son, Lady Liang, and allied himself to discontent courtiers. They raised a force to murder Mocang Epang and his clan, including the daughter that had been married to Yizong. Yizong then married Lady Liang and appointed her brother, Liang Yimai, as palace minister. This would start two generations of Liang dominance in Xia. During Yizong's reign, he attempted to enact more Chinese forms of governance by replacing Tangut rites with Chinese court ritual and dress, which was opposed by the Liang faction that favored Tangut forms. From 1061-1062, Yizong started communicating with the Song using Chinese courtesy protocols and requested imports of Chinese official clothing and books from the Song. He also requested a Song princess in marriage as well as skilled artisans from the Song, but these requests were denied. At the same time, Song and Xia emissaries regularly exchanged insults.

The emperor supported sinification through the import of Chinese books, revived the use of his Chinese surname Li and other Chinese protocols, and pursued accommodation with the Song dynasty in border disputes and opening of trade. However, these diplomatic overtures were squandered by arrogant Song representatives who insulted the Xia envoy. The Liang clan was reportedly of Han Chinese ancestry, albeit assimilated into Tangut culture, but their faction would later lead the opposition to the pro-Chinese policy. The Han Chinese empresses of the Liang clan, Paul Forage notes, were more aggressive in their stance against the Song dynasty than the emperors they were representing. However the Liang name has also been attached to the Dangchang clan, who were ancestors of the Tanguts, so the Liang clan may have been simply Tanguts who were knowledgeable about Chinese culture.

In 1064, Yizong raided the Song dynasty. In the fall of 1066, he mounted two more raids and in September, an attack on Qingzhou was launched. The Tangut forces destroyed several fortified settlements. Song forces were surrounded for three days before cavalry reinforcements arrived. Yizong was wounded by a crossbow and forced to retreat. Tangut forces attempted another raid later on but failed, and a night attack by Song forces scattered the Tangut army. Yizong regrouped at Qingtang and launched another attack on Qingzhou in December but withdrew after threats by Emperor Yingzong of Song to escalate the conflict. The next year, the Song commander Chong E attacked and captured Suizhou.

Yizong died in January 1068, presumably from his wounds, at the age of 20.

=== Huizong (1068–1086) ===
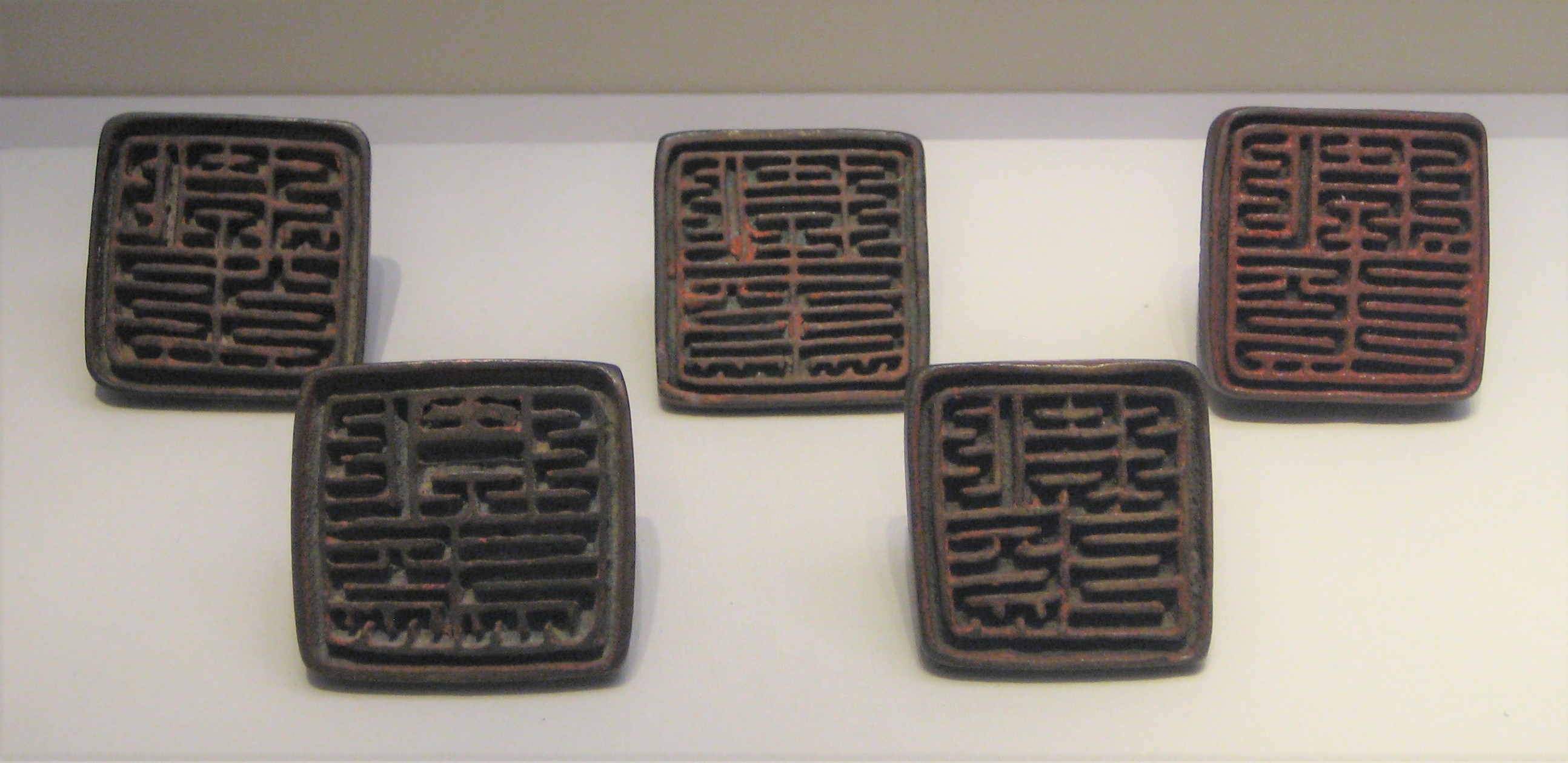
Bronze Xia seals bearing the Tangut seal script characters 𗥦𗖅 (ɣu sjwi) "commander"

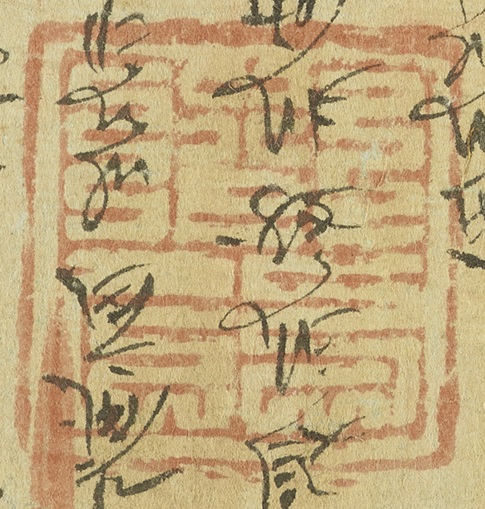
Impression of the "commander" seal

The seven-year-old Bingchang, posthumously Emperor Huizong of Western Xia, succeeded his father, Emperor Yizong of Western Xia. Under the regency of empress dowager Liang, the Xia reverted to Tangut rites in 1069.

Huizong's reign began with an inconclusive war with the Song dynasty in 1070–1071 over Suizhou. In 1072 Huizong's sister was married to Linbuzhi (Rinpoche), the son of the Tsongkha ruler, Dongzhan. These events occurred under the regency of the Empress Dowager Liang and her brother, Liang Yimai. Huizong was married to one of Yimai's daughters to ensure the continued control of the Liang over the imperial Weiming clan. In 1080 Huizong rebelled against his mother's dominance by discarding Tangut rituals in favor of Chinese ceremonies. A year later an alleged plot by Huizong and his Han concubine, Li Qing, to kill Liang Yimai and to turn over the Xia's southern territory to the Song was uncovered. Huizong escaped an ambush by Yimai at a banquet but was eventually captured. Li Qing was executed and Huizong was imprisoned in a dungeon. The emperor's loyalists immediately rallied their forces to oppose Liang rule while Yimai tried to in vain to summon them with the imperial silver paiza.

Seeing the infighting breaking out in the Xia, the Song decided to go on the offensive. In 1081, the Song dynasty launched a five-pronged attack on the Xia. After initial victories, Song forces failed to take the capital of Xia, Xingqing, and remained on the defensive for the next three years. Xia counterattacks also experienced initial success before failing to take Lanzhou multiple times. In 1085, the war ended with the death of Emperor Shenzong of Song.

In the summer of 1081, the five Song armies invaded Western Xia. Chong E defeated a Xia army, killing 8,000. In October, Li Xian took Lanzhou. On 15 October, Liu Changzuo's 50,000-strong army met a Xia force of 30,000 led by the Empress Regent Liang's brother. Liu's commanders advised him to take a defensive position, but he refused, and led a contingent of shield warriors with two ranks of crossbowmen and cavalry behind, with himself leading at the front with two shields. The battle lasted for several hours before the Xia forces retreated, suffering 2,700 casualties. Afterwards, Liu captured a large supply of millet at the town of Mingsha, and headed towards Lingzhou. Liu's vanguard attacked the town's gate before the defenders had a chance to close it, dealing several hundred casualties, and seizing more than 1,000 cattle before retreating. Liu wanted Gao Zunyu to help him take Lingzhou, but Gao refused. Then Liu suggested they take the Xia capital instead, to which Gao also refused, and instead took it as a slight that he could not take Lingzhou. Gao relayed his version of events to the Song court, then had Liu removed from command, merging the two forces.

By November, the Xia had abandoned the middle of the Ordos plateau, losing Xiazhou. On 20 November, Wang Zhongzheng took Youzhou and slaughtered its inhabitants. At this point Wang became concerned that he would run out of supplies and quarreled with Chong E over provisions. He also forbade his troops from cooking their meals because he feared it would alert Xia raiders of their position. His troops became ill from their uncooked food, started to starve, and came under attack by enemy cavalry anyway. Wang was ordered to withdraw while Chong E covered his retreat. Wang lost 20,000 men.

On 8 December, Gao Zunyu decided to attack Lingzhou, only to realize he had forgotten to bring any siege equipment, and there were not enough trees around for their construction. Gao took out his frustration on Liu Changzuo, who he tried to have executed. Liu's troops were on the verge of mutiny before Fan Chuncui, a Circuit judge, convinced Gao to reconcile with Liu. On 21 December, Xia forces breached the dikes along the Yellow River and flooded the camps of the two besieging Song armies, forcing them to retreat. Xia harassment turned the retreat into a rout.

By the end of 1081, only Chong E remained in active command. In September 1082, the Xia counterattacked with a 300,000 strong army, laying siege to Yongle, a fortress town west of Mizhi. The Xia sent out cavalry to prevent Song relief attempts. The defending commander, Xu Xi, deployed his troops outside the town gates but refused to attack the enemy troops while they forded the river. Then he refused to let his troops in when the Tangut Iron Hawk cavalry attacked, decimating the defending army. With the capture of Yongle, the Song lost 17,300 troops.

In March 1083, Xia forces attacked Lanzhou. The defending commander, Wang Wenyu, led a small contingent out at night and made a surprise attack on the Xia encampment, forcing them to retreat. The Tanguts made two more attempts to take Lanzhou in April and May but failed on both accounts. Their simultaneous attack on Linzhou also failed. After multiple defeats, the Xia offered peace demands to the Song, which they refused. In January 1084, Xia forces made a last attempt to take Lanzhou. The siege lasted for 10 days before the Tangut army ran out of supplies and was forced to retreat.

The war ended in 1085 with the death of Emperor Shenzong in April. In exchange for 100 Chinese prisoners, the Song returned four of the six captured towns. Hostilities between the Song and Xia would flare up again five years later, and conflict would continue sporadically until the Song lost Kaifeng in the Jingkang incident of 1127.

Huizong was returned to his throne in 1083. Liang Yimai died in 1085 and his son, Liang Qipu, succeeded his position as chief minister. The Empress Dowager Liang also died later that year. In 1086 Huizong died at the age of 26.

=== Chongzong (1086–1139) ===
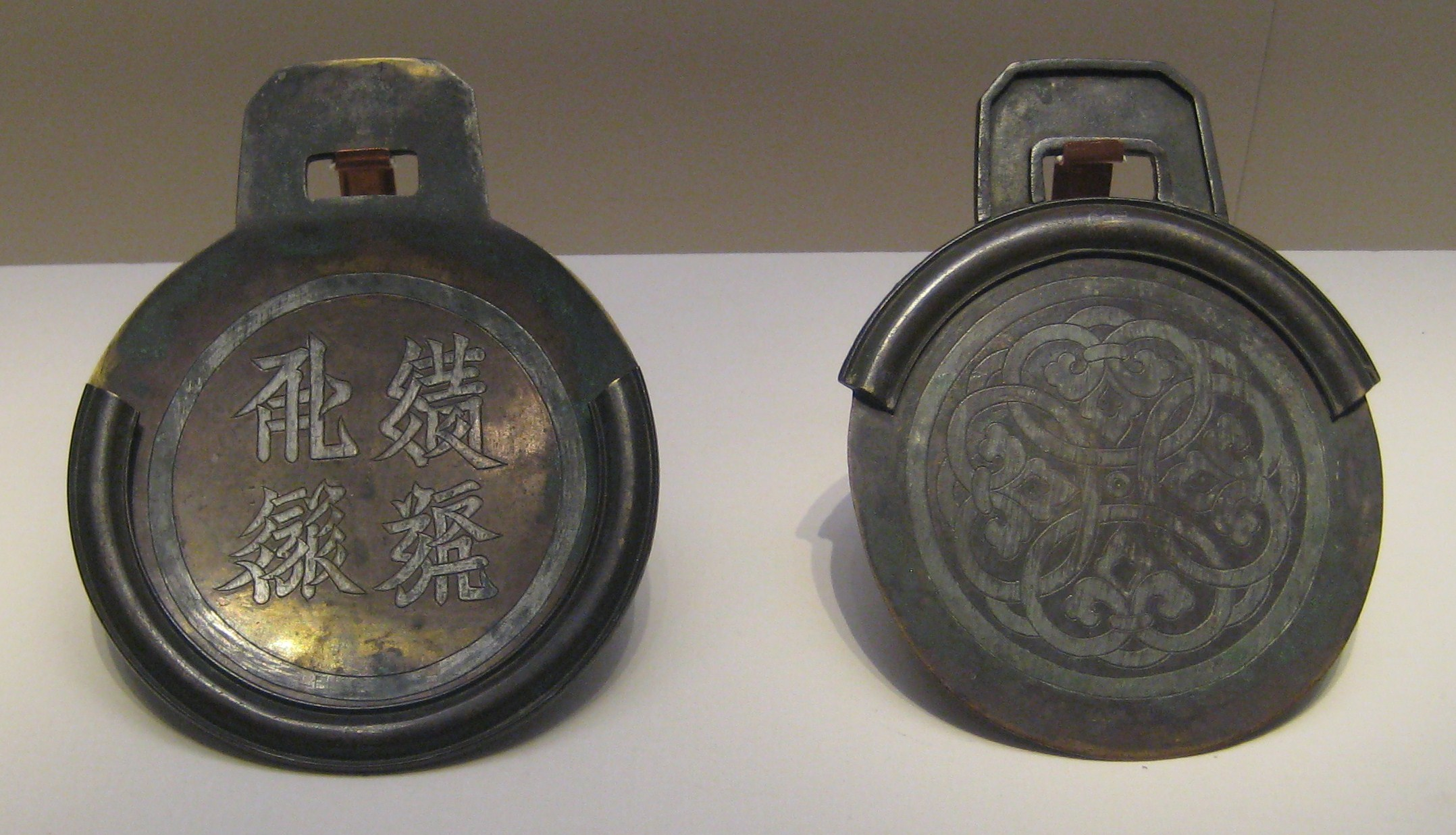
Western Xia paiza with four Tangut characters reading 𗿢𗯼𘆝𗪊 "By imperial command, a pass to burn the horses" (i.e. to ride with great urgency)

The three-year-old Qianshun succeeded his father, Emperor Huizong of Western Xia, as emperor, posthumously Emperor Chongzong of Western Xia. His mother, the new Empress Dowager Liang (Zhaojian), the younger sister of Liang Qipu, ruled as regent. The Song dynasty continued to campaign against the Xia in 1091 and 1093. In 1094, Rende Baozhuang and Weiming Awu slew Liang Qipu and exterminated his clan. In 1096 the Song stopped paying tribute to the Xia and the next year, launched an "advance and fortify" campaign centered on guarding key locations along river valleys and mountains to erode the Xia position. From 1097 to 1099, the Song army constructed 40 fortifications across the Ordos plateau. In 1098, the Empress Regent Liang sent a 100,000 strong army to recapture Pingxia. The Tangut army was completely defeated in their attempt to dislodge the Song from their high ground position, and their generals Weiming Amai and Meiledubu were both captured. The Empress Dowager Liang led armies against the Song, allegedly at the head of a cavalry force, until her death in 1099 when was poisoned by assassins from the Liao dynasty. At the same time, the Tanguts were also involved in a war with the Zubu to their north.

In 1103, the Song annexed Tsongkha and spent the following year weeding out native resistance. The expansion of Song territory threatened the Xia's southern border, resulting in Tangut incursions in 1104 and 1105. Eventually the Xia launched an all out attack on Lanzhou and Qingtang. However, after the Advance and Fortify campaign of 1097–1099, Xia forces were no longer able to defeat Song positions. Failing to take major cities, the Tangut forces went on a rampage, killing tens of thousands of local civilians. The next year, Chongzong made peace with the Song, but was unable to clearly demarcate their borders, leading to another war in 1113.

In 1113, the Xia started building fortifications in disputed territory with the Song, and took the Qingtang region. Incensed at this provocation, Emperor Huizong of Song dispatched Tong Guan to evict the Tanguts. In 1115, 150,000 troops under the command of Liu Fa penetrated deep into Xia territory and slaughtered the Tangut garrison at Gugulong. Meanwhile, Wang Hou and Liu Chongwu attacked the newly built Tangut fortress of Zangdihe. The siege ended in failure and the death of half the invasion force. Wang bribed Tong to keep the number of casualties a secret from the emperor. The next year, Liu Fa and Liu Chongwu took a walled Tangut city called Rendequan. Another 100,000 troops were sent against Zangdihe and succeeded in taking the fortress. The Xia made a successful counterattack in the winter of 1116–1117. Despite piling casualties on the Song side, Tong was adamant about eradicating the Xia once and for all. He gave orders for Liu Fa to lead 200,000 into the heart of the Xia empire, aiming straight at the capital region. It quickly became apparent that this was a suicide mission. The Song army was met outside the city by an even larger Tangut army led by the Xia prince, Chage. The Tangut army surrounded the Song forces, killing half of them, with the remaining falling back during the night. The Tanguts pursued the Song and defeated them again the next day. Liu was beheaded. A ceasefire was called in 1119 and Huizong issued an apology to Xia.

The Western Xia and main contemporary Asian polities circa 1100.

In 1122, the Jürchen Jin dynasty took the Southern Capital of the Liao dynasty, and the remaining Khitans fled in two groups to the west. One group led by Xiao Gan fled to Xia where they set up a short lived Xi dynasty that lasted only five months before Gan died at the hands of his own troops. The other group, led by Yelü Dashi, joined Emperor Tianzuo of Liao at the Xia border. In the early summer of 1123, Dashi was captured by the Jin and forced to lead them to Tianzuo's camp, where the entire imperial family except for Tianzuo and one son were captured. Tianzuo sought refuge with Chongzong, who while initially receptive, changed his mind after warnings from the Jurchens and declared himself a vassal of Jin in 1124.

Domestically the reign of Chongzong saw a formal consolidation of the relationship between the imperial court and the great clans, whose positions were assured in legal documents. After his mother's death in 1099, Chongzong stripped the Rende clan of its military power. Rende Baozhuang was demoted. Chongzong's brother, Chage, was given command of the Tangut army, which he led to many victories against the Song. A state school was established with 300 students supported by government stipends. A "civilian" faction arose under the leadership of the imperial Prince Weiming Renzhong, who often denounced Chage for corruption and abuse of power. Chongzong shuffled appointments to play the two factions against each other. In 1105, Chongzong married a Liao princess, who along with her son, apparently died of heartbreak in 1125 when the Khitan emperor was captured by the Jurchens. In 1138, the penultimate year of his reign, Chongzong took the daughter of Ren Dejing as his empress.

Chongzong died at the age of 56 in the summer of 1139.

=== Renzong (1139–1193) ===
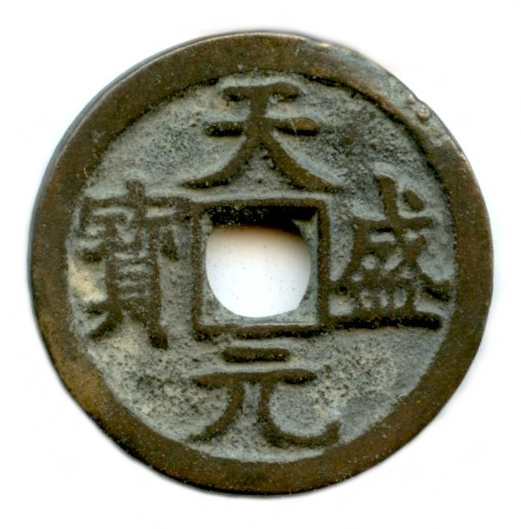
Western Xia coin c. 1149-1169

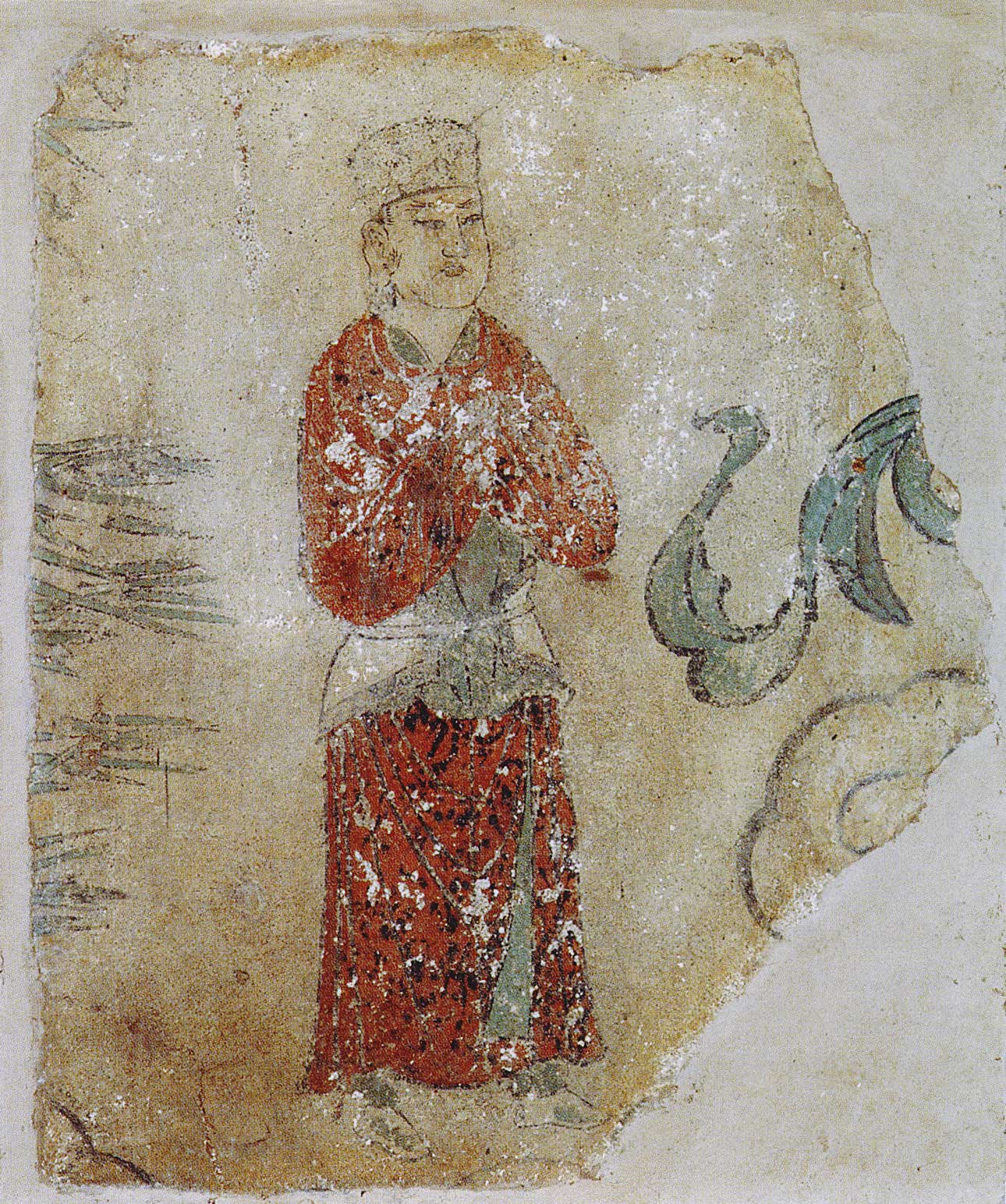
Praying Tangut man

The 16-year-old Renxiao succeeded his father, Emperor Chongzong of Western Xia, as emperor, posthumously Emperor Renzong of Western Xia. His mother was the Chinese concubine, Lady Cao.

In 1140 a group of Khitan exiles led by Xiao Heda rebelled. The Xia forces under Ren Dejing crushed them. Renzong wanted to reward Ren with a palace appointment but his councilor, Weiming Renzhong, convinced him to keep him as a field commander.

In 1142-3 famine and earthquake caused unrest in Xiazhou. Renzong responded with tax remissions and relief measures.

In 1144 Renzong decreed the establishment of schools throughout the country and a secondary school opened for imperial scions aged seven to fifteen. A Superior School of Chinese Learning was opened the following year and Confucian temples were built throughout the land. In 1147 imperial examinations were instituted for the selection of candidates to office, however the Tangut law code does not mention these exams as an official method for official recruitment. While other sources do confirm that examination degrees were awarded, the Tangut law code only discusses inheritance of office and rank. In 1148 an Inner Academy was established and staffed with renowned scholars. Renzong also greatly patronized Buddhist learning. The majority of the Tangut Tripitaka was completed during his reign. In 1189, the 50th anniversary of Renzong's accession, 100,000 copies of the "Sutra on the visualization of the Maitreya Bodhisattva's ascent and rebirth in Tushita Heaven" (Guan Mile pusa shang sheng Toushuai tian jing) was printed and distributed in both Chinese and Tangut, and 50,000 copies of other sutras were also printed.

After the deaths of Renzhong and Chage in 1156, Ren Dejing rose through the ranks and became very powerful. In 1160 he obtained the noble title of Chu, the first Chinese to do so in the Tangut state. Ren tried to have the schools shut down and called them useless Chinese institutions wasting resources on parasitic scholars. It is unknown how the emperor responded but the schools were not closed. In 1161 the emperor opened a Hanlin Academy to compile the Xia historical records.

In 1161-2 the Tanguts briefly occupied territory of both the Jurchen Jin dynasty and Song dynasty during the Jin–Song Wars.

From 1165 to 1170, Ren Dejing tried to establish his own semi-autonomous realm, and in the process meddled in the affairs of the Zhuanglang tribes, who lived in the border region of the Tao River valley. He also tried to enlist the help of the Jurchens, but they refused his overtures. Ren started construction of fortifications along the Jin border. In 1170 Ren pressured Renzong to grant him the eastern half of the realm as well as for Emperor Shizong of Jin to grant him investiture. In the summer of that year, Renzong's men secretly rounded up Ren Dejing and his adherents, executing them.

Wo Daochong succeeded Ren Dejing as chief minister. A Confucian scholar, he translated the Analects and provided commentary to it in the Tangut language. Upon his death, Renzong honored him by having his portrait displayed in all the Confucian temples and schools.

The Jurchens closed down border markets in Lanzhou and Baoan in 1172 and would not reopen them until 1197. They accused the Tanguts of trading worthless gems and jades for their silk. Tangut border raids increased during this period until the Jurchens reopened one market in 1181. In 1191 some Tangut herdsmen strayed into Jurchen territory and was chased away by a Jin patrol. They them ambushed and killed the pursuing patrol officer. Renzong refused to extradite the herdsmen and assured the Jurchens that they would be punished.

Renzong died in 1193 at the age of 70.

=== Huanzong (1193–1206) ===
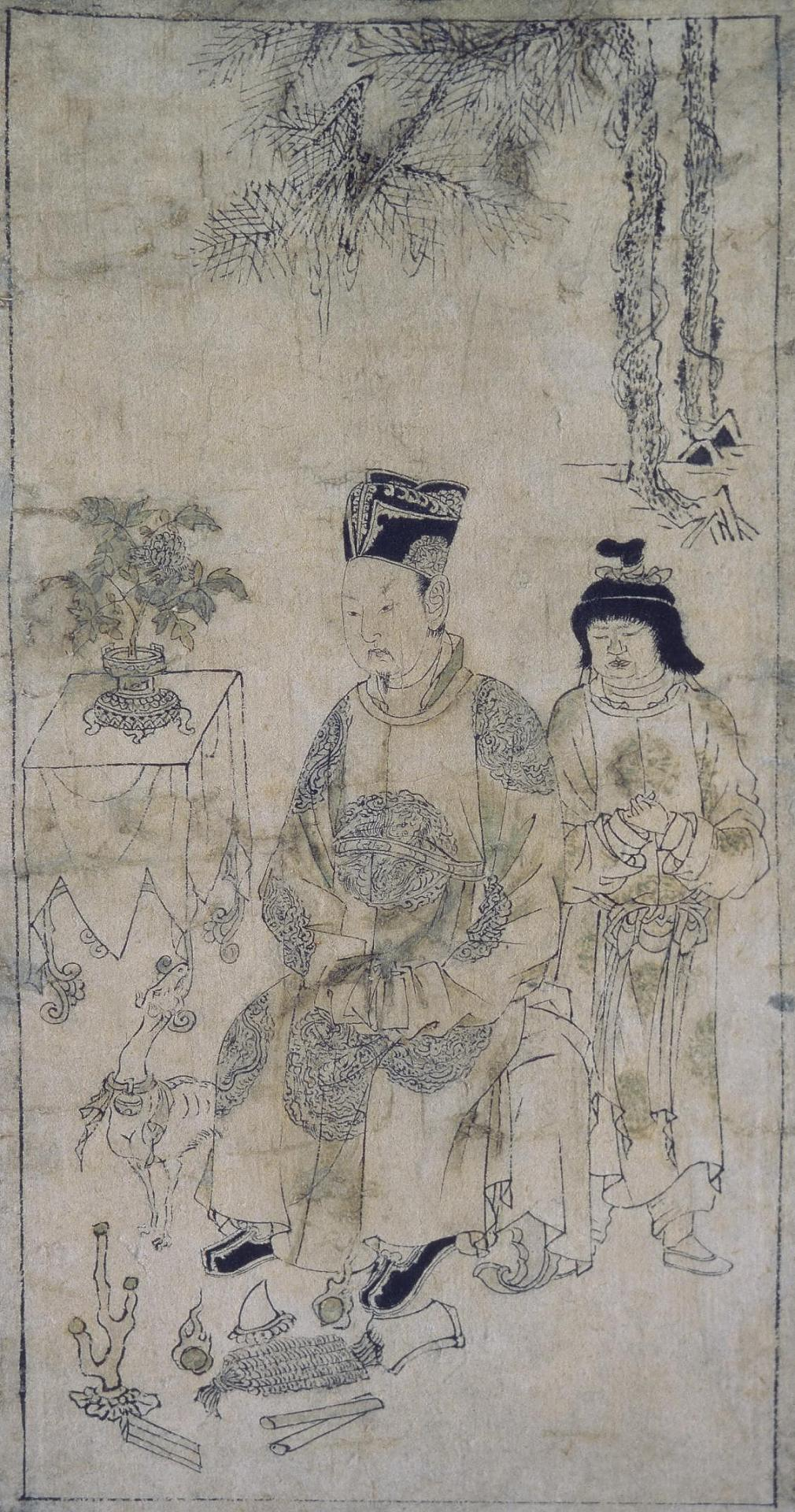
The Tangut Emperor and a boy, 13th century

The 17-year-old Chunyou succeeded his father, Emperor Renzong of Western Xia, as emperor, posthumously Emperor Huanzong of Western Xia. Little besides the rise of Temüjin and his conflict with Western Xia is known about Huanzong's reign. In 1203, Toghrul was defeated by Temüjin. Toghrul's son, Nilqa Senggum, fled through Tangut territory and although the Tanguts refused to provide him with refuge, and he raided their territory, Temüjin used this as pretext to raid Western Xia. The resulting attack in 1205 caused one local Tangut noble to defect to the Mongols, the plundering of several fortified settlements, and loss of livestock.

In 1206, Temüjin was formally proclaimed Genghis Khan, ruler of all Mongols, marking the official start of the Mongol Empire. In the same year, Huanzong was deposed in a coup by his cousin Anquan, who installed himself as Emperor Xiangzong of Western Xia. Huanzong died much later in captivity.

=== Xiangzong (1206–1211) ===
In 1207, Genghis led another raid into Western Xia, invading the Ordos Loop and sacking Wulahai, the main garrison along the Yellow River, before withdrawing in the spring of 1208. The Tanguts tried to form a united front with the Jurchen Jin dynasty against the Mongols, but the usurper monarch, Wanyan Yongji, refused to cooperate and declared that it was to their advantage that enemies attack one another.

In the autumn of 1209, Genghis received the submission of the Uyghurs to the west and invaded Western Xia. After defeating an army led by Gao Lianghui outside Wulahai, Genghis captured the city and pushed up along the Yellow River, capturing several garrisons and defeating another imperial army. The Mongols besieged the capital, Zhongxing, which held a well-fortified garrison of 150,000, and attempted to flood the city by diverting the Yellow River. The dike they built broke and flooded the Mongol camp, forcing them to withdraw. In 1210, Xiangzong agreed to submit to Mongol rule, and demonstrated his loyalty by giving a daughter, Chaka, in marriage to Genghis and paying a tribute of camels, falcons, and textiles.

After their defeat in 1210, Western Xia attacked the Jin dynasty in response to their refusal to aid them against the Mongols. The following year, the Mongols joined Western Xia and began a 23-year-long campaign against Jin. In the same year Xiangzong's nephew Zunxu seized power in a coup and became Emperor Shenzong of Western Xia. Xiangzong died a month later.

=== Shenzong (1211–1223) ===
Emperor Shenzong of Western Xia was the first person in the imperial family to pass the palace examinations and receive a jinshi degree.

Shenzong appeased the Mongols by attacking the Jurchens and in 1214, supported a rebellion against the Jurchens. In 1216, Western Xia provided auxiliary troops to the Mongols for an attack on Jin territory. The Tanguts also invited the Song dynasty to join them in attacking the Jin, but nothing came of this except an aborted joint action in 1220. The antagonistic policy towards the Jurchen Jin was unpopular at court, as was cooperating with the Mongols. A certain Asha Gambu emerged as an outspoken proponent of anti-Mongol policy. In the winter of 1217–1218, the Mongols called on Western Xia to provide them troops for campaigns further west, but they refused to comply. No immediate retaliation occurred since Genghis left for the west in 1219 and left Muqali in charge of North China. In 1223, Muqali died. At the same time, Shenzong abdicated to his son, Dewang, posthumously Emperor Xianzong of Western Xia.

=== Xianzong (1223–1226) ===
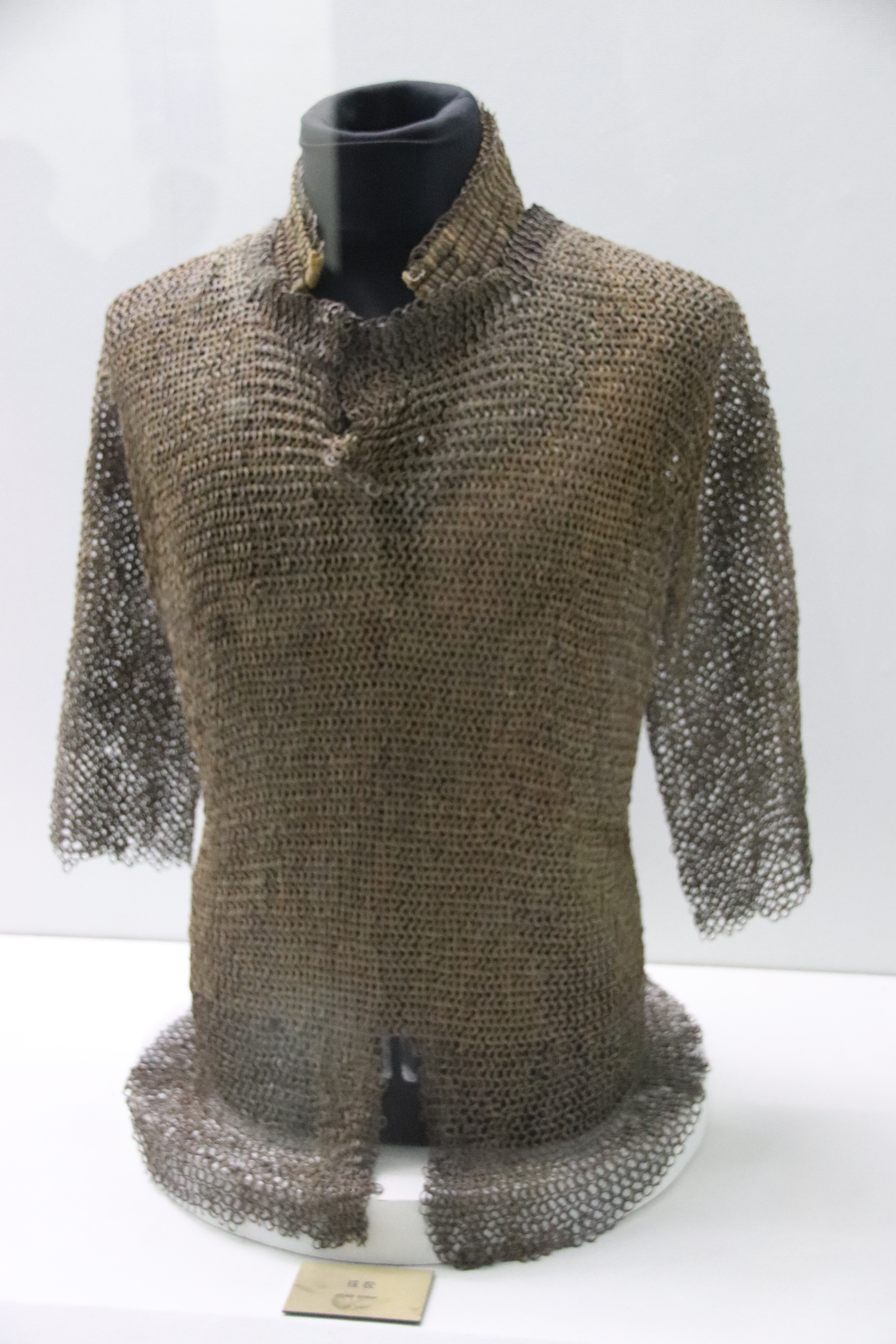
Western Xia mail armour

Emperor Xianzong of Western Xia began peace talks with the Jurchen Jin in 1224 and the peace agreement was finalized in the fall of 1225. The Tanguts continued to defy the Mongols by refusing to send a hostage prince to the Mongol court.

After defeating Khwarazm in 1221, Genghis prepared his armies to punish Western Xia. In 1225, Genghis attacked with a force of approximately 180,000. According to the Secret History of the Mongols, Genghis was injured in 1225 during a horse hunt when his horse bolted from under him. Genghis then tried to offer Western Xia the chance to willingly submit, but Asha Gambhu mocked the Mongols and challenged them to battle. Genghis pledged to avenge this insult. Genghis ordered his generals to systematically destroy cities and garrisons as they went.

Genghis divided his army and sent general Subutai to take care of the westernmost cities, while the main force under Genghis moved east into the heart of the Western Xia and took Suzhou and Ganzhou, which was spared destruction upon its capture due to it being the hometown of Genghis's commander Chagaan. After taking Khara-Khoto in early 1226, the Mongols began a steady advance southward. Asha, commander of the Western Xia troops, could not afford to meet the Mongols as it would involve an exhausting westward march from the capital through 500 kilometers of desert, so the Mongols steadily advanced from city to city.

In August 1226, Mongol troops approached Liangzhou, the second-largest city in Western Xia, which surrendered without resistance. In autumn 1226, Genghis crossed the Helan Mountains, and in November laid siege to Lingwu, a mere 30 kilometers from the capital. At this point, Xianzong died, leaving his relative, Xian, posthumously Emperor Mozhu of Western Xia, to deal with the Mongol invasion.

=== Mo (1226–1227) ===
Emperor Mo of Western Xia led a 300,000 strong army against the Mongols and was defeated. The Mongols sacked Lingzhou.

Genghis reached the Western Xia capital in 1227, laid siege to the city, and launched several offensives against the Jin to prevent them from sending reinforcements to Western Xia, with one force reaching as a far as Kaifeng, the Jin capital. The siege lasted for six months before Genghis offered terms of surrender. During the peace negotiations, Genghis continued his military operations around the Liupan mountains near Guyuan, rejected a peace offer from the Jin, and prepared to invade them near their border with the Song.

In August 1227, Genghis died of uncertain causes, and, in order not to jeopardize the ongoing campaign, his death was kept a secret. In September 1227, Emperor Mo surrendered to the Mongols and was promptly executed. The Mongols then pillaged the capital, slaughtered the city's population, plundered the imperial tombs to the west, and completed the annihilation of the Western Xia state.

=== Destruction ===
The destruction of Western Xia during the second campaign was nearly total. According to John Man, Western Xia is little known to anyone other than experts in the field due to Genghis Khan's policy calling for their complete eradication. He states that "There is a case to be made that this was the first ever recorded example of attempted genocide. It was certainly very successful ethnocide."

However, some members of the Western Xia royal clan emigrated to western Sichuan, northern Tibet, and even possibly Northeast India, in some instances becoming local rulers. A small Western Xia state was established in Tibet along the upper reaches of the Yalong River while other Western Xia populations settled in what are now the modern provinces of Henan and Hebei. In China, remnants of the Western Xia persisted into the middle of the Ming dynasty.

Unlike for the Liao, Jin and Song, the Yuan did not compile an official history of the Western Xia.

== Military ==
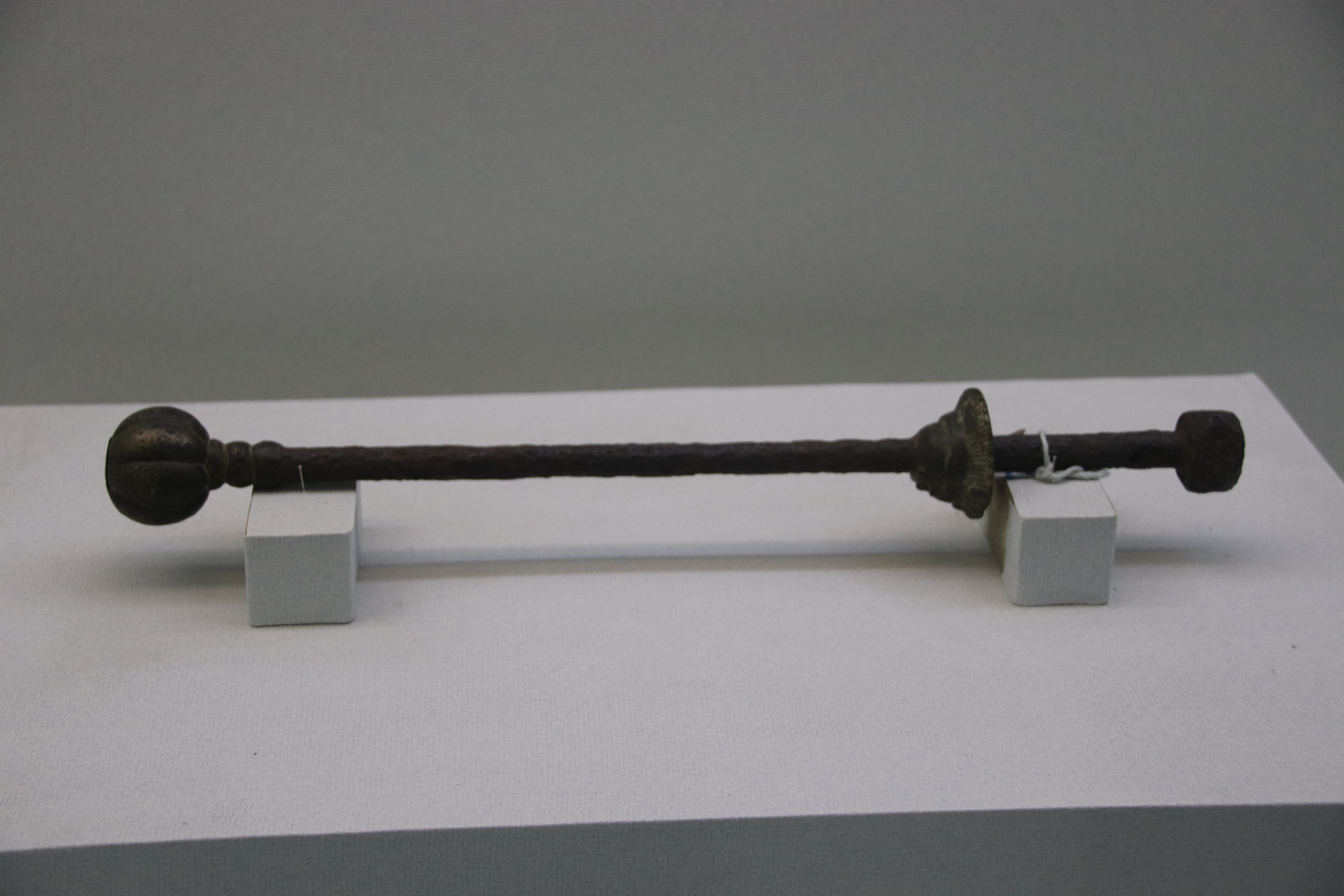
Mace, Western Xia

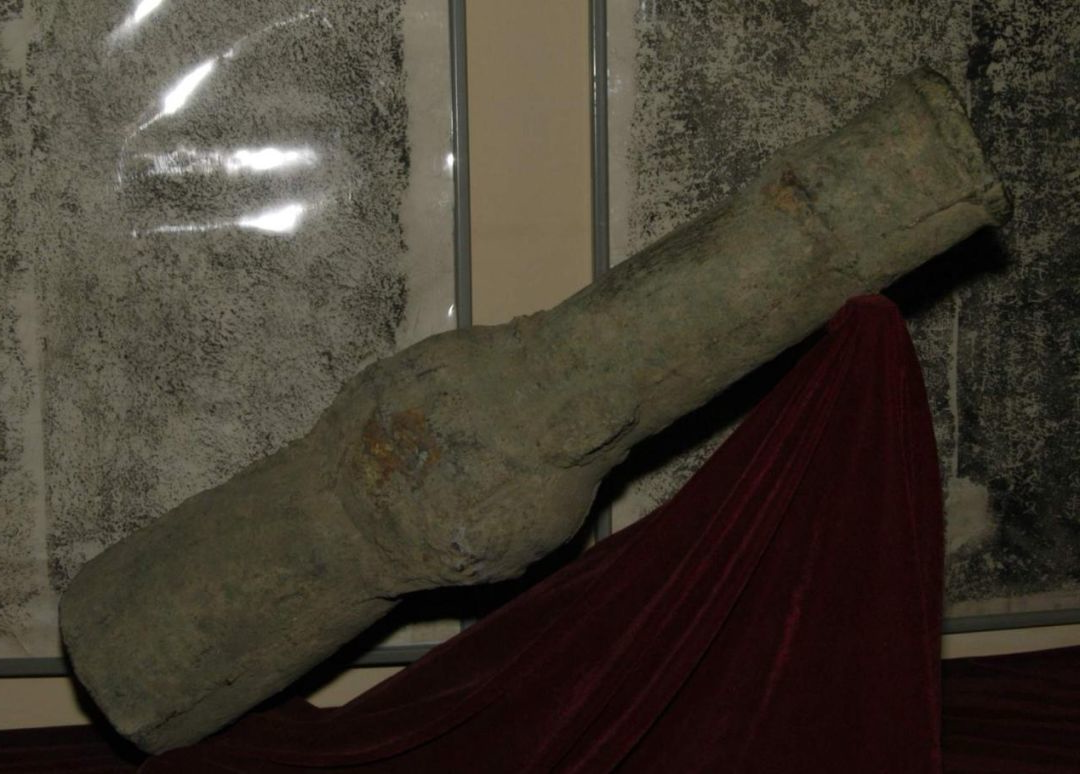
The Wuwei Bronze Cannon, early 13th century

The Western Xia had two elite military units, the Iron Hawks (tie yaozi), a 3,000 strong heavy cavalry unit, and Trekker infantry (bubazi), mountain infantry. The brother of Emperor Chongzong of Western Xia, Chage, mentioned that Trekker infantry had difficulty fighting Mighty-Arm bows, a type of Song dynasty crossbow:

Since ancient times we have fought using both infantry and cavalry. Although we have the Iron Hawks that can charge on the plains and the Trekker infantry that can fight in the hills, if we happen to encounter some new tactic our cavalry will have difficulty deploying. If we encounter [Mighty- Arm bows], then our infantry will be scattered. The problem is our troops can only fight according to convention and are unable to adapt to changes during battle.

— Chage

In 1980, the Wuwei Bronze Cannon was discovered in a cellar dating to the Western Xia period. Dating to the early 13th century, it is one of the earliest cannons ever discovered. It weighs 108 kg and was discovered with an iron ball about 9cm in diameter inside its barrel.

== Culture ==
Fragment of a stele with Tangut script

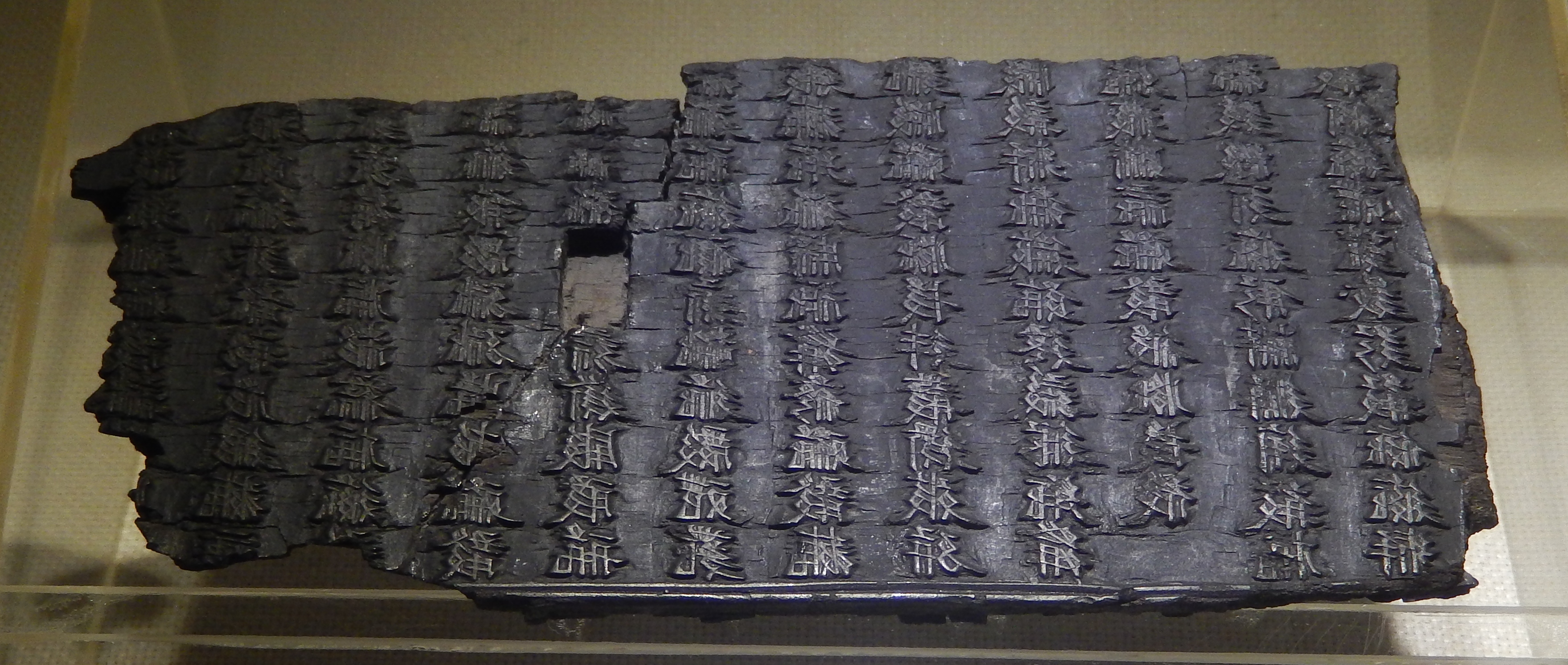
Tangut printing block

=== Language ===
The kingdom developed a Tangut script to write its own Tangut language, a now extinct Tibeto-Burman language probably related to the Horpa taxon.

Tibetans, Uyghurs, Han, and Tanguts served as officials in Western Xia. It is unclear how distinct the different ethnic groups were in the Xia state as intermarriage was never prohibited. Tangut, Chinese and Tibetan were all official languages.

A system of writing its language, based on Chinese and Khitan, was created in 1036, and many Chinese books were translated and then printed in this script. Gifts and exchanges of books were arranged with the Sung court from time to time; Buddhist sutras were donated no fewer than six times and some of them were translated and printed. After the Mongol conquest of Tangut and China, a Tangut edition of the Tripitaka in the Hsi-hsia script, in more than 3620 chüan, was printed in Hangchow and completed in 1302, and about a hundred copies were distributed to monasteries in the former Tangut region. Many fragments of books in Tangut and Chinese were discovered at the beginning of this century, including two editions of the Diamond sutra printed in 1016 and 1189, and two bilingual glossaries, the Hsi-Hsia Tzu Shu Yun Thung (+ 1132), and the Fan Han Ho Shih Chang Chung Chu (+ 1190). Apparently many books in their native tongue were also printed under the Tangut rulers.

— Tsien Tsuen-hsuin

Western Xia pioneered the use of movable type printing, using both ceramic and wooden movable type to print texts. After the death of Bi Sheng (972–1051), who invented movable type, the technology next appeared in Western Xia. A Buddhist text known as the Vimalakirti Nirdesa Sutra was found in modern Wuwei, Gansu, dating to the reign of Emperor Renzong of Western Xia (r. 1125-1193). The text features traits that have been identified as hallmarks of clay movable type such as the hollowness of the character strokes and deformed and broken strokes. The Tanguts printed the Auspicious Tantra of All-Reaching Union, a 449-page text considered to be the earliest extant example of a text printed using the wooden movable type. The Auspicious Tantra texts were found in the ruins of the Baisigou Square Pagoda in the Helan Mountains, Ningxia. They feature traits of movable type texts such as identical length bar lines, some characters printed upside down, different shades of ink, and interlaced lines. Another Tangut text known as the Avatamsaka Sutra contains descriptions of the merits of wooden movable type such as a "vow to carve individual characters", "those engaged in typesetting are virtuous", and "those engaged in carving characters and printing are intelligent and can expect to have their wishes fulfilled". The text shows traits of movable type such as correcting mistakes by directly overlaying incorrect characters with the correct ones. Twelve Tangut titles printed in movable type survive to this day.

=== Dress ===
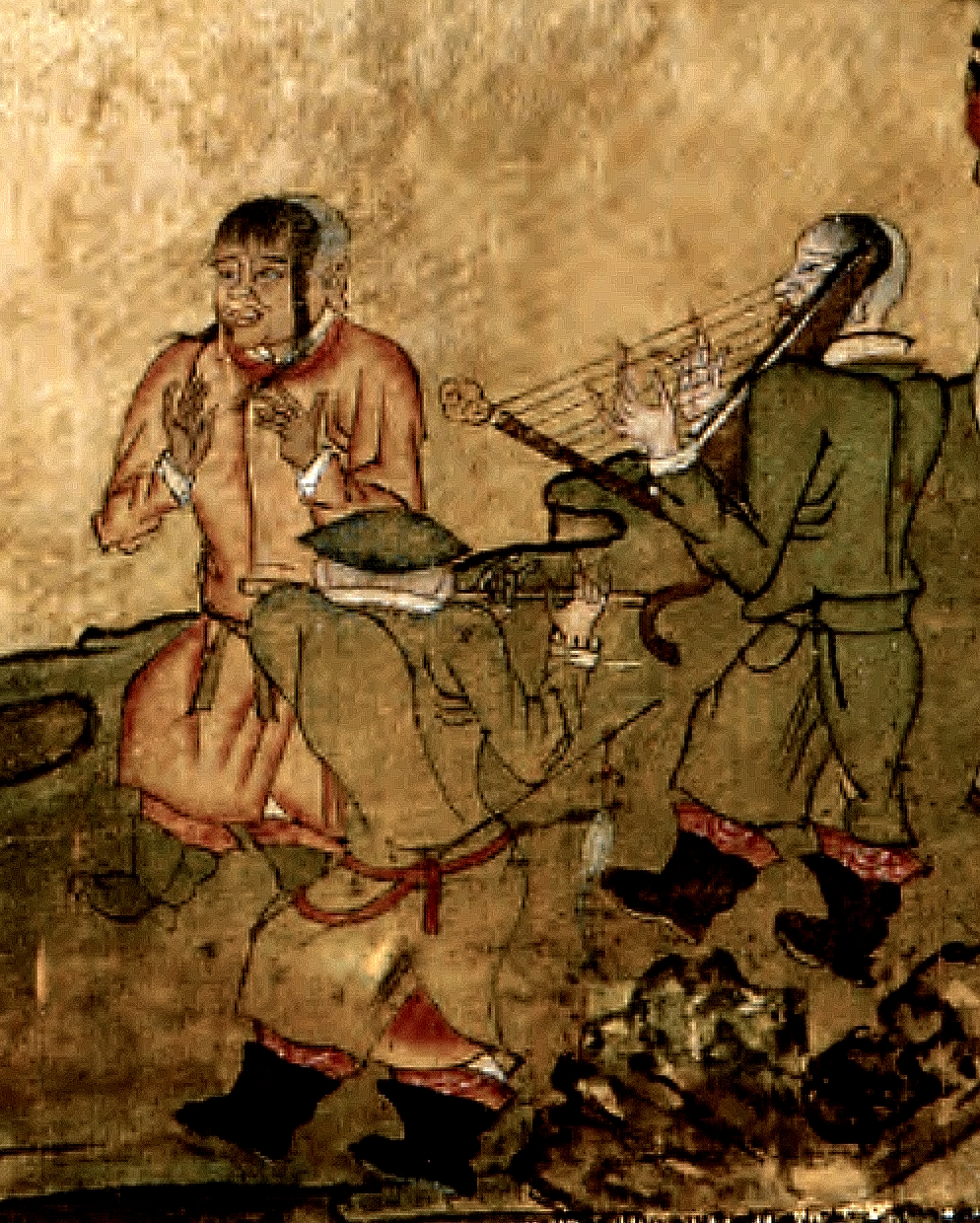
Moon-Water Bodhisattva Kuanyin, detail of entertainers. China, Tangut State of Xi-Xia, Khara Khoto. 10-13th century. State Hermitage Museum

In 1034 Li Yuanhao (Emperor Jingzong) introduced and decreed a new custom for Western Xia subjects to shave their heads, leaving a fringe covering the forehead and temples, ostensibly to distinguish them from neighbouring countries. Clothing was regulated for different classes of official and commoners. Dress seemed to be influenced by Tibetan and Uighur clothing.

In 1061, Emperor Yizong of Western Xia decreed that the court would adopt Chinese court rituals and dress.

=== Religion ===
The government-sponsored state religion was a blend of Tibetan Tantric Buddhism and Chinese Mahayana Buddhism with a Sino-Nepalese artistic style. The scholar-official class engaged in the study of Confucian classics, Taoist texts, and Buddhist sermons, while the Emperor portrayed himself as a Buddhist king and patron of Lamas.

Early in the kingdom's history, Chinese Buddhism was the most widespread form of Buddhism practiced. However, around the mid-twelfth century Tibetan Buddhism gained prominence as rulers invited Tibetan monks to hold the distinctive office of state preceptor. The practice of Tantric Buddhism in Western Xia led to the spread of some sexually related customs. Before they could marry men of their own ethnicity when they reached 30 years old, Uighur women in Shaanxi in the 12th century had children after having relations with multiple ethnic Han men, with her desirability as a wife enhancing if she had been with a large number of men.

During the Song invasion of 1081, an officer remarked that Liangzhou was full of Buddhist monks as well as Taoist priests.

=== Status of women ===
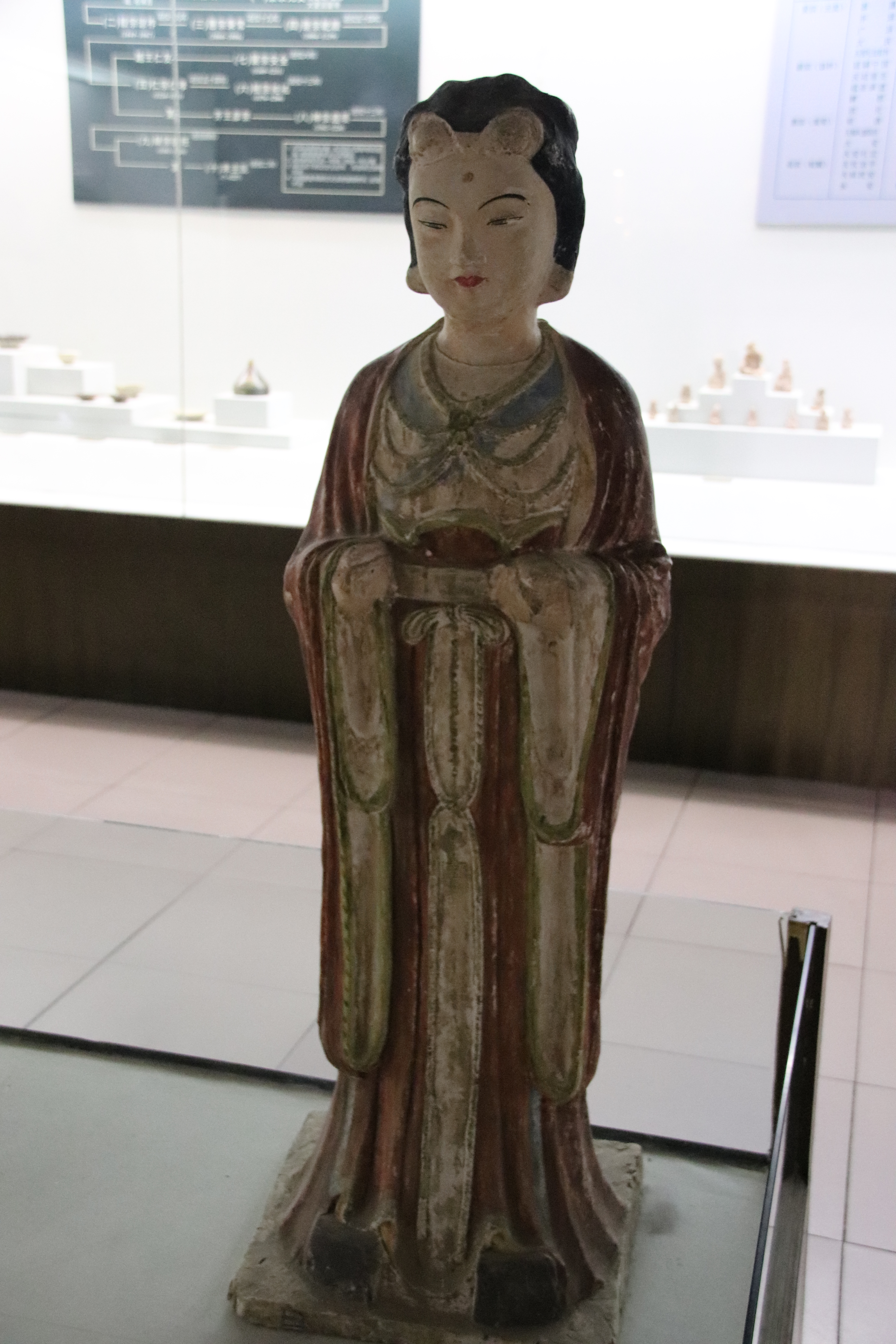
Pottery figure of a woman, Western Xia

Tangut society was patriarchal and a woman was considered the property of her parents, husband, and in-laws. A Tangut proverb describes the role of men and women: "A woman is governed by purity within the tent, and a man by purity in the state". Tangut men could have one wife but multiple concubines. If the man committed a crime requiring collective punishment, the children of concubines were exempt while the children of the wife were exiled to become shepherds and peasants. The age of marriage for a woman was 13 under the Tangut Code. A man who touched an under-age girl against her will was punished but if it was with her consent, she was punished. Only her father or maternal uncle were allowed to report assaults.

Marriage was arranged by the parents of the groom and bride. The groom's parents paid a fee for the girl while the bride's parents provided a dowry. Payments could be made in installments over three years but if the groom's side failed to pay the full price at that point, he was obligated to live with the bride's parents and work off the payment over three years. If the groom's parents refused to make the payment and the marriage had not been finalized, the bride's parents could annul the marriage, otherwise the Tangut Code forbids the bride's family from initiating the dissolution of the marriage. Marriage without consent by the parents was forbidden. In cases where such a marriage occurred and was only discovered 6 months after the fact, the marriage was preserved, otherwise it was considered invalid. In cases where the parents were absent, other senior family members could fulfill the role.

The Tangut Code forbids same surname marriages. People with the same surname were considered clan members and a marriage between such individuals was considered incest. The punishment for such an arrangement was the annulment of the marriage within one year and three years of hard labor.

Divorce could occur if the woman committed adultery but the Tangut Code does not mention adultery by the husband. The punishment for adultery depended on the status of the man with whom the woman committed adultery with, ranging from one month to two or three years of hard labor. Adultery with a slave resulted in the slave's execution by strangulation and the woman was sentenced to 13 years of hard labor, after which she was forced to live at the site and forbidden to return to her home.

The reasons for which a husband could divorce his wife were called the "Seven Defects": absence of children, inability to serve the in-laws, talkativeness, theft, jealousy, chronic illness, and adultery. There were exceptions to these reasons, such as the existence of a defect prior to marriage, or a sudden change in social status prior to marriage. If a divorce went ahead without a reason, the husband forfeited everything he received from her parents. He could not sell her or transfer her to another man. If the husband was captured, the wife could go free and remarry after five years if they had no children, and after ten years if they had children. A woman was obliged to mourn her husband's death for three years.

Unmarried girls or widows could become nuns with the permission of their parents. Widows who became nuns were categorized by the status of their husbands. The wives and mothers of high officials wore red robes while the wives and mothers of lower officials wore yellow robes. Unmarried girls who were servants of the emperor were not allowed to marry. If they did start families, their daughters remained with them while their sons were enlisted in the military. Male offspring out of wedlock could also be given to the military.

The Tangut Code emphasizes the unequal status of men and women in its punishments. If a man killed his wife, he was punished with eight years of hard labor but if a wife killed her husband, she was punished with execution by beheading. A woman could be pledged for a debt as long as the husband had his wife's permission, although selling a wife could be punished by five to eight years of hard labor for the man. Female slaves were considered livestock and their offspring were the property of the owner. If a woman of rank was raped by a commoner or a person of lower rank, the guilty party was punished with 12 years of penal servitude. If the victim was a slave or prostitute, the punishment was six years of penal servitude. Women who were pregnant or sick could not be tried for cases involving the death penalty, nor could pregnant women be beaten with sticks.

According to a stele inscription dated to the first month of 1094 (erected at the Huguo Temple in Liangzhou), Empress Zhaojian rode at the front of the cavalry while campaigning against the Song dynasty. She was trained in military affairs and had previously led Xia troops into a conquered Song city in 1082.

=== Economy ===
The economy of the empire mainly consisted of agriculture, pastoralism, and trade (especially with Central Asia).

== Rulers ==
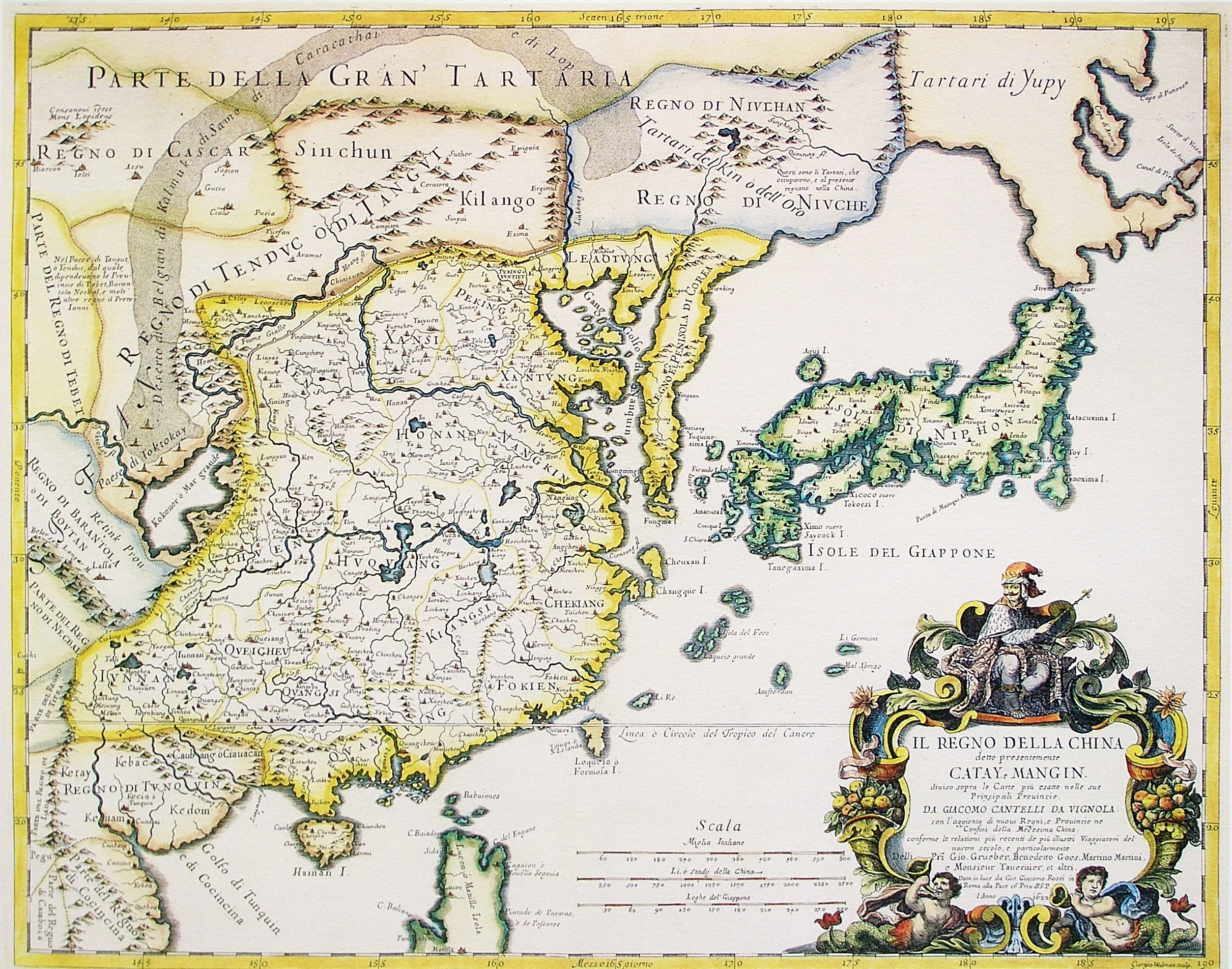
450 years after the destruction of the Tangut empire, the "Kingdom of Tenduc or Tangut" was still shown on some European maps as China's northwestern neighbor

Temple Name	Posthumous Name	Personal Name	Reign Dates
Jǐngzōng (景宗)	Emperor Wǔliè (武烈皇帝)	Lǐ Yuánhào (李元昊)	1038–1048
Yìzōng (毅宗(	Emperor Zhāoyīng (昭英皇帝)	Lǐ Liàngzuò (李諒祚)	1048–1067
Huìzōng (惠宗)	Emperor Kāngjìng (康靖皇帝)	Lǐ Bǐngcháng (李秉常)	1067–1086
Chóngzōng (崇宗)	Emperor Shèngwén (聖文皇帝)	Lǐ Qiánshùn (李乾順)	1086–1139
Rénzōng (仁宗(	Emperor Shèngdé (聖德皇帝)	Lǐ Rénxiào (李仁孝)	1139–1193
Huánzōng (桓宗)	Emperor Zhāojiǎn (昭簡皇帝)	Lǐ Chúnyòu (李純佑)	1193–1206
Xiāngzōng (襄宗)	Emperor Jìngmù (敬慕皇帝)	Lǐ Ānquán (李安全)	1206–1211
Shénzōng (神宗)	Emperor Yīngwén (英文皇帝)	Lǐ Zūnxū (李遵頊)	1211–1223
Xiànzōng (獻宗)	None	Lǐ Déwàng (李德旺)	1223–1226
None	None	Lǐ Xiàn (李晛)	1226–1227

Each Western Xia emperor established one or more era names in Chinese and Tangut, although not all the Tangut versions are known.

Emperor	Era Name	Tangut	Dates
Jǐngzōng	Tiānshòu Lǐfǎ Yánzuò (天授禮法延祚)		1038–1048
Yìzōng	Yánsì Níngguó (延嗣寧國)		1049
Yìzōng	Tiānyòu Chuíshèng (天祐垂聖)		1050–1052
Yìzōng	Fúshèng Chéngdào (福聖承道)	𗼃𗼕 or 𗣼𗧯	1053–1056
Yìzōng	Duǒdū (奲都)		1057–1062
Yìzōng	Gǒnghuà (拱化)		1063–1067
Huìzōng	Qiándào (乾道)		1068–1069
Huìzōng	Tiāncì Lǐshèng Guóqìng (天賜禮盛國慶)	𘀗𗙀𗅲𗯿𗂧𗴴	1070–1074
Huìzōng	Dà'ān (大安)	𘜶𗵐	1075–1085
Huìzōng	Tiān'ān Lǐdìng (天安禮定)	𘓺𗪚𗅲𗧯	1086
Chóngzōng	Tiānyí Zhìpíng (天儀治平)	𘓺𗫸𗁣𘇚	1086–1089
Chóngzōng	Tiānyòu Mín'ān (天祐民安)	𘓺𗼕𘂀𗴴	1090–1097
Chóngzōng	Yǒng'ān (永安)	𗦷𗪚	1098–1100
Chóngzōng	Zhēnguān (貞觀)	𗣼𘝯	1101–1113
Chóngzōng	Yōngníng (雍寧)	𗖠𗪚	1114–1118
Chóngzōng	Yuándé (元德)	𗣼𗪟	1119–1127
Chóngzōng	Zhèngdé (正德)	𗣼𘇚	1127–1134
Chóngzōng	Dàdé (大德)	𘜶𗣼	1135–1139
Rénzōng	Daqing (大慶)	𘜶𘅝	1140–1143
Rénzōng	Rénqìng (人慶)	𗸦𘅝	1144–1148
Rénzōng	Tiānshèng (天盛)	𘓺𘃸	1149–1169
Rénzōng	Qiányòu (乾祐)	𘀗𘑨	1170–1193
Huánzōng	Tiānqìng (天慶)	𘓺𘅝	1194–1206
Xiāngzōng	Yìngtiān (應天)		1206–1209
Xiāngzōng	Huángjiàn (皇建)	𘓺𘚪	1210–1211
Shénzōng	Guāngdìng (光定)	𗪚𗏴	1211–1223
Xiànzōng	Qiándìng (乾定)	𘀗𗪚	1223–1226
Lǐ Xiàn	Bǎoqìng (寶慶)		1226–1227

== Territory ==
The Tanguts once ruled over parts of today's Ningxia, Gansu, eastern Qinghai, northern Shaanxi, northeastern Xinjiang, southwestern Inner Mongolia, and southernmost Outer Mongolia.

=== Administrative divisions ===
Prefecture	Chinese	Modern location
Xingzhou (Xingqing, Ducheng)	興州 (兴庆)	Yinchuan, Ningxia
Dingzhou	定州	Pingluo County, Ningxia
Huaizhou		East of Yinchuan, Ningxia
Yongzhou		Yongning County, Ningxia
Liangzhou (Xiliangfu)	涼州 (西凉府)	Wuwei, Gansu
Ganzhou (Xuanhuafu)	甘州 (宣化府)	Zhangye, Gansu
Suzhou	肃州	Jiuquan, Gansu
Guazhou	瓜州	Guazhou County, Gansu
Shazhou	沙州	Dunhuang, Gansu
Lingzhou	靈州	Northwest of Wuzhong, Ningxia
Hongzhou		Southwest of Jingbian, Shaanxi
Youzhou	宥州	Otog Front Banner, Inner Mongolia and Jingbian, Shaanxi
Yinzhou	銀州	Mizhi County, Shaanxi
Xiazhou	夏州	Hengshan, Shaanxi
Shizhou		Hengshan, Shaanxi
Yanzhou	延州	Dingbian County and Yan'an, Shaanxi
Nanweizhou		Tongxin County, Ningxia
Huizhou		Jingyuan, Gansu
Xiningzhou		Xining, Qinghai
Lezhou		South of Ledu, Qinghai
Kuozhou		Southwest of Hualong, Qinghai
Jishizhou		Xunhua County, Qinghai
Suizhou	綏州	Suide County, Shaanxi
Qingzhou	庆州	Qingyang, Gansu
Jingzhou	靜州	Mizhi County, Shaanxi

== Gallery ==
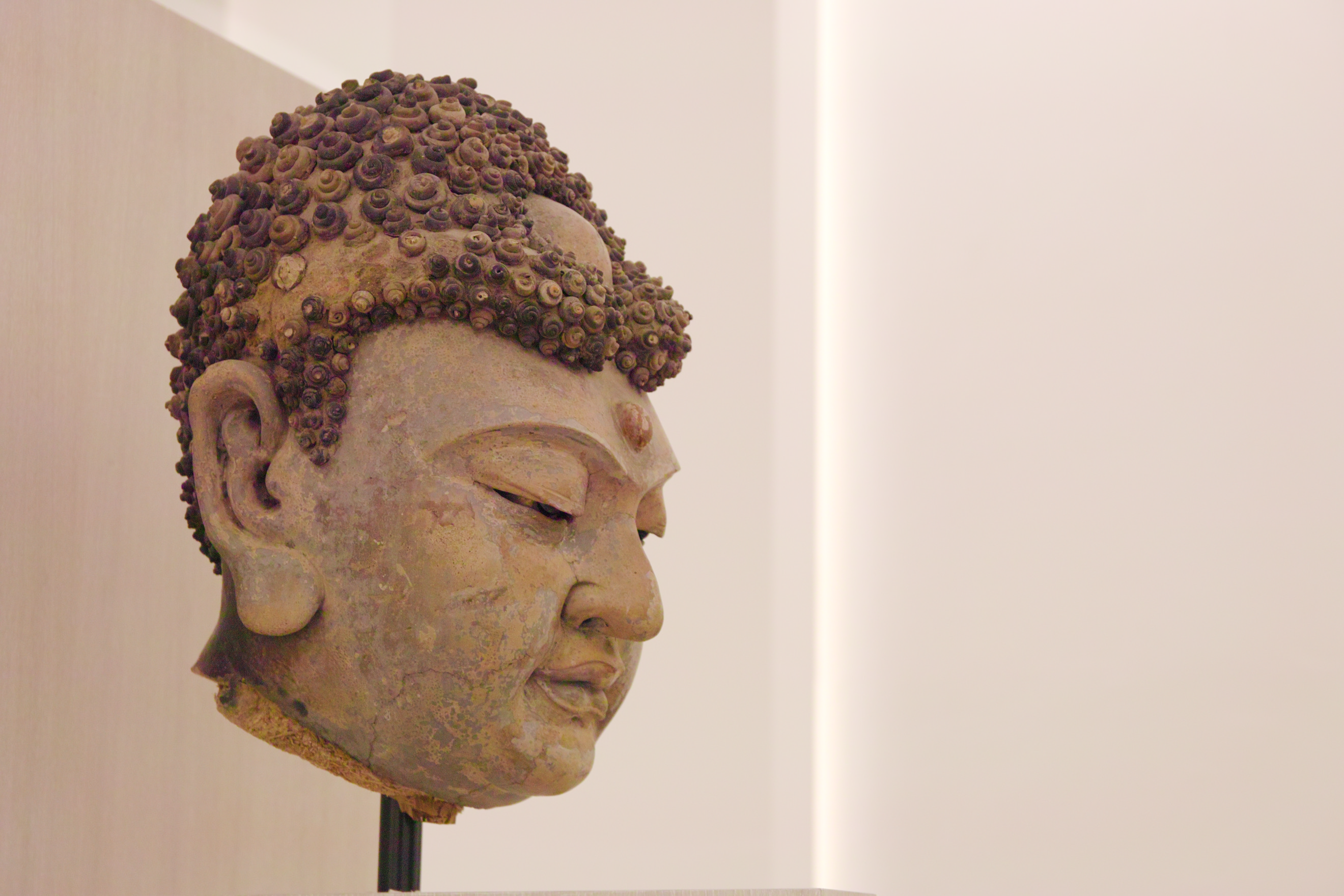
A clay head of the Buddha, 12th century

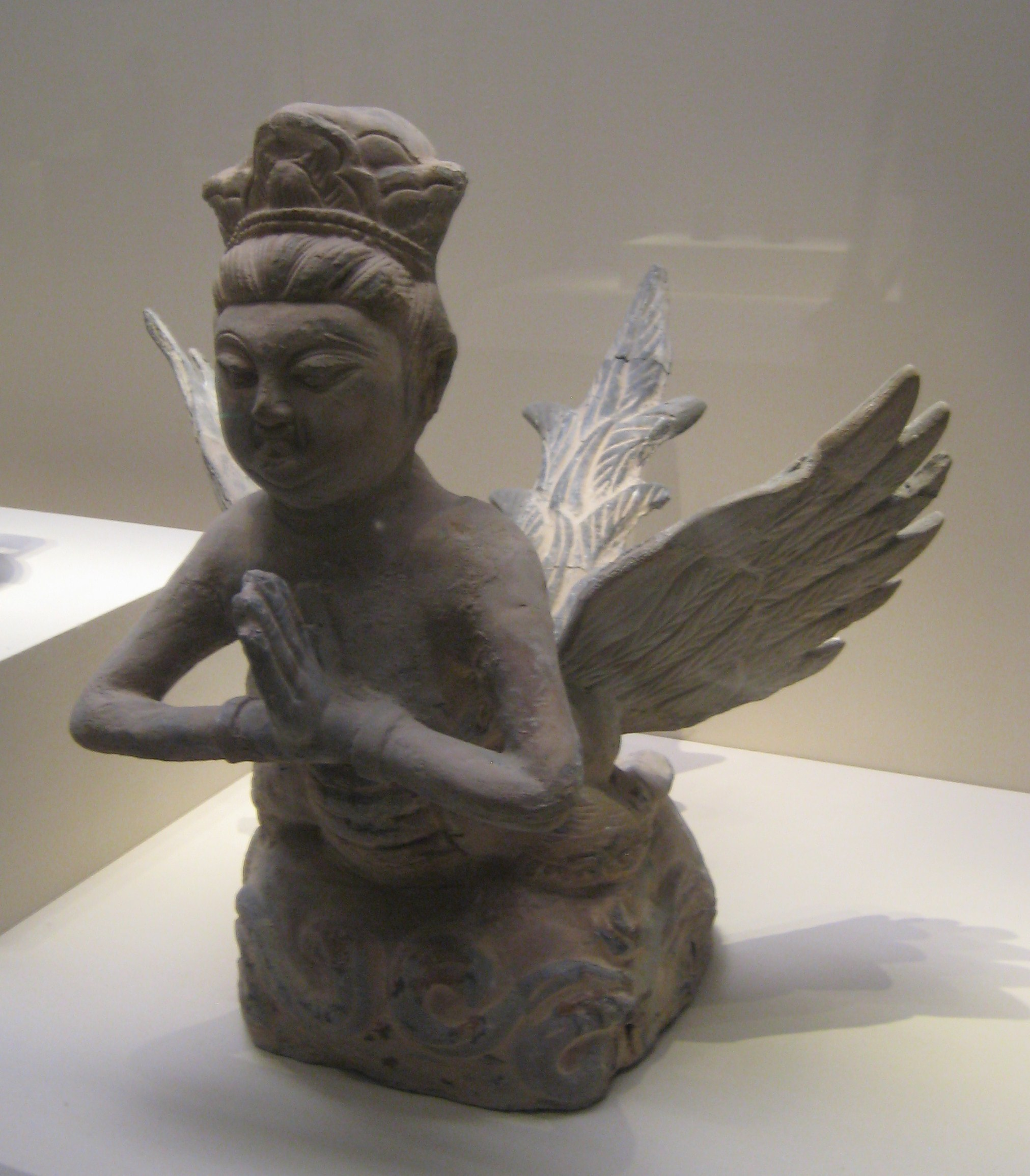
A winged kalavinka made of grey pottery

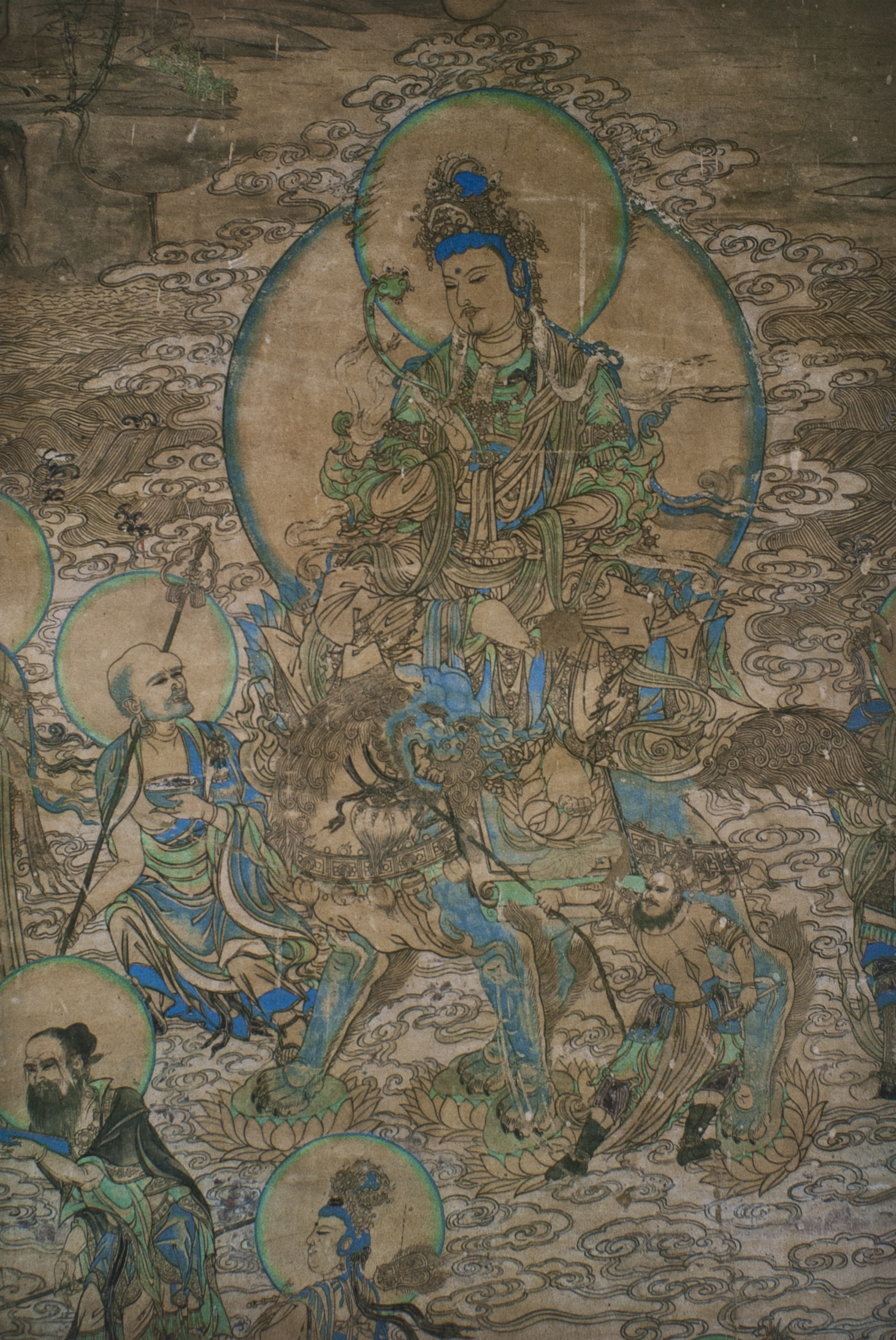
A painting of the Buddhist manjusri, Yulin Caves

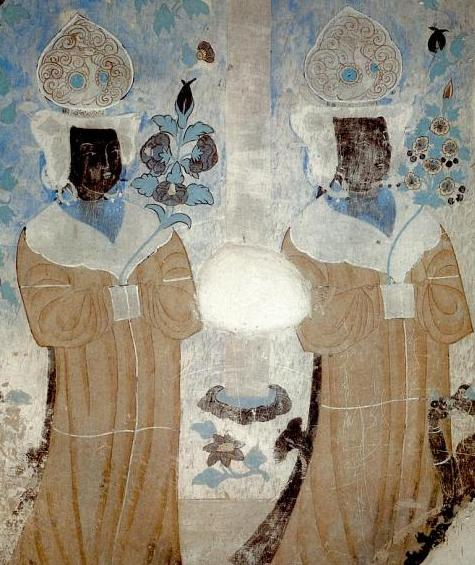
Concubines of the Tangut ruler

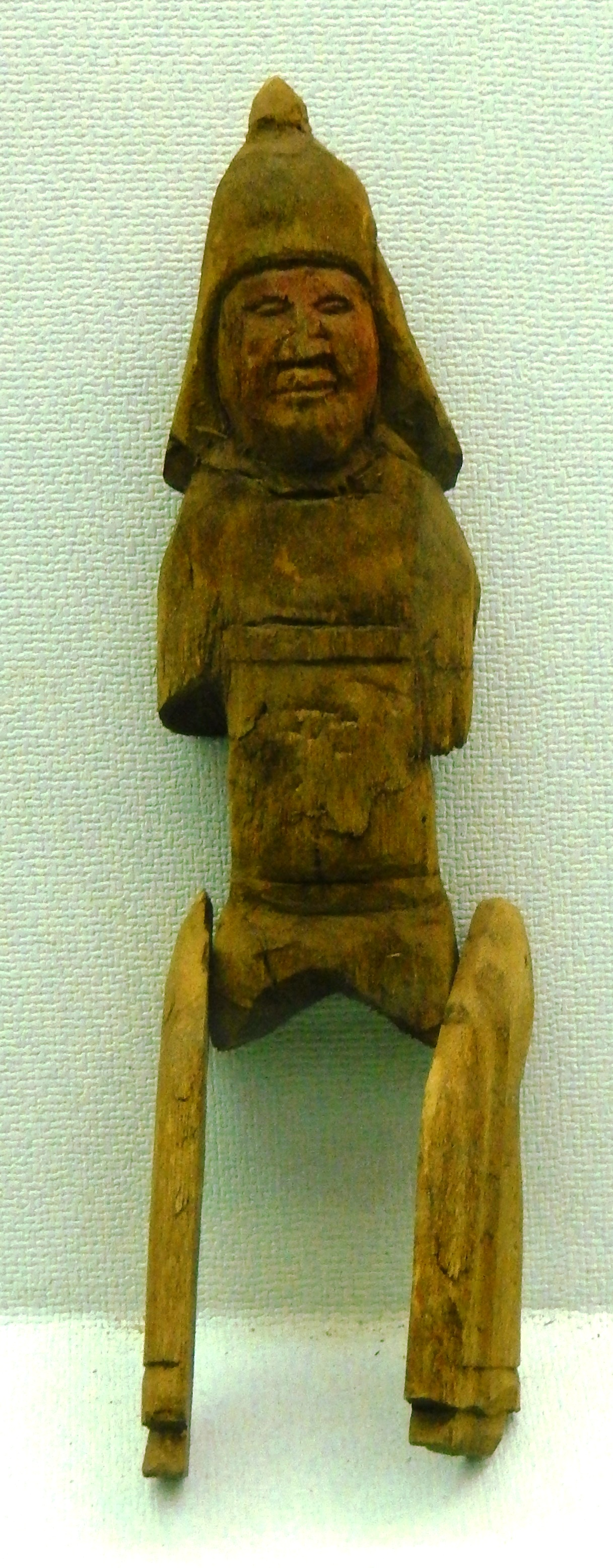
Wooden figure of a Tangut soldier

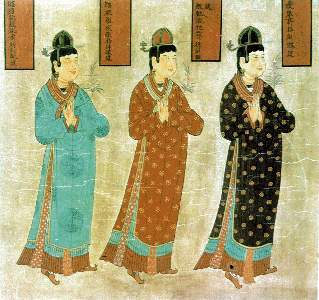
Tangut women

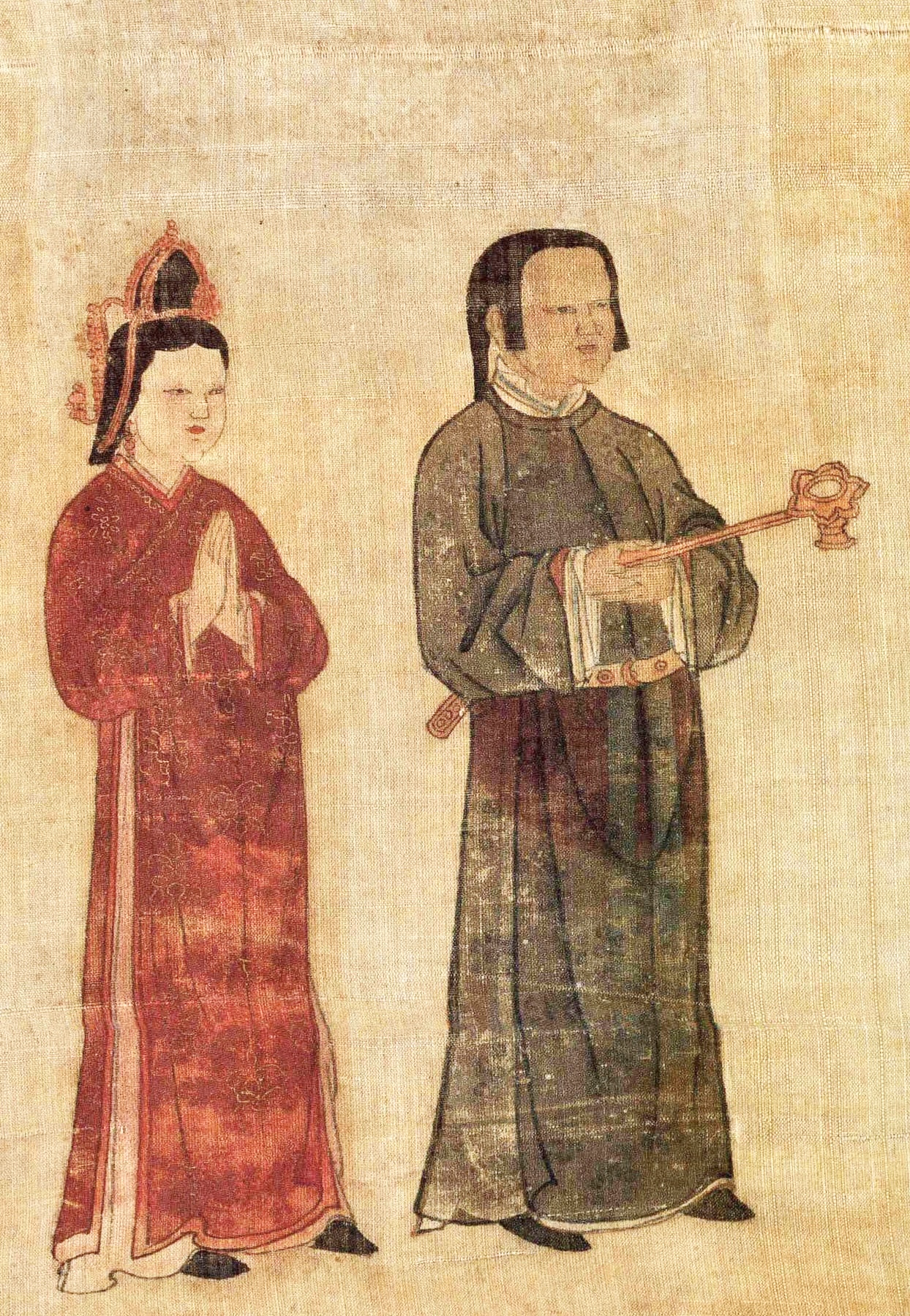
Tangut bride

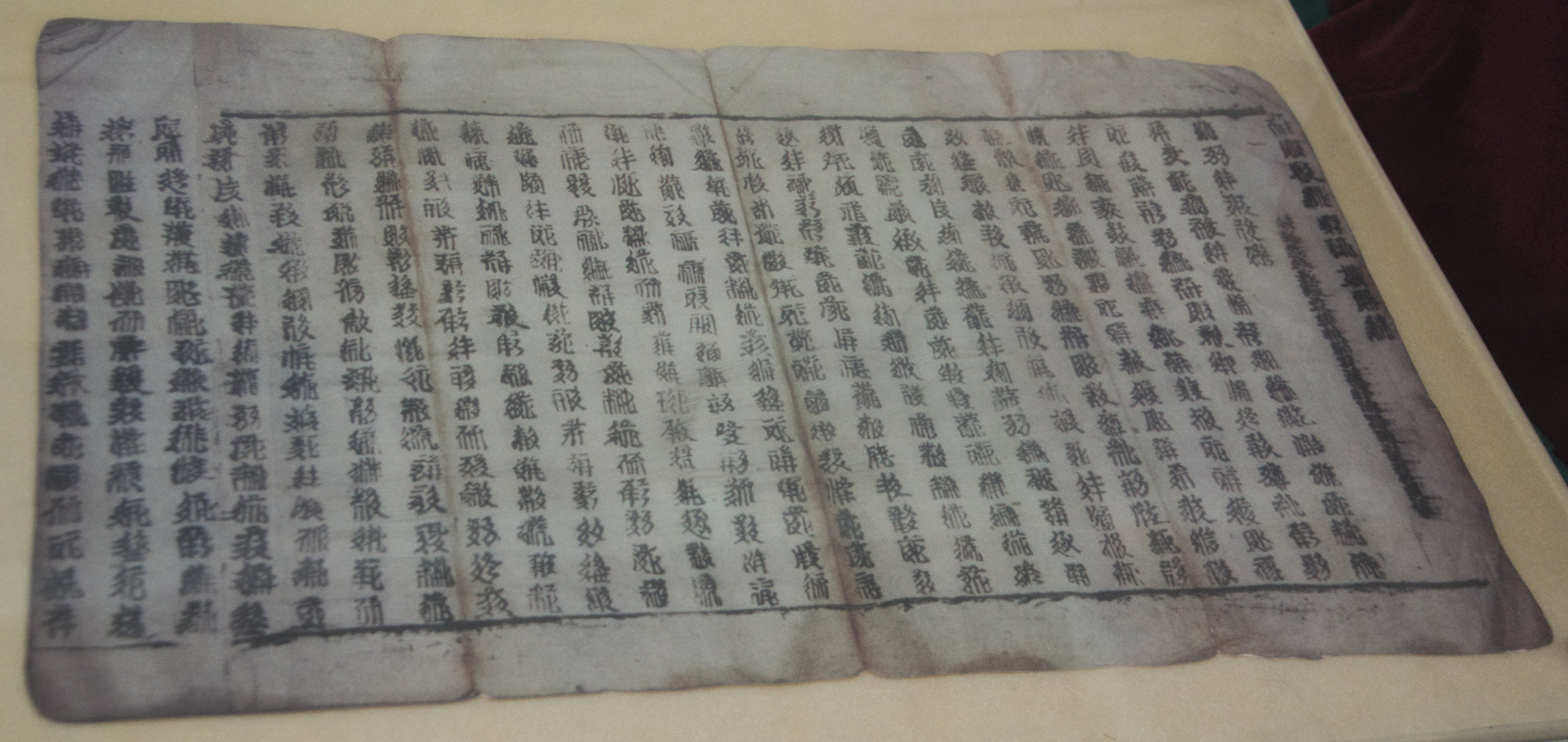
Printed text using pottery (argile) movable type, mid-12th century; Xinhua Township (新华乡), Wuwei, Gansu

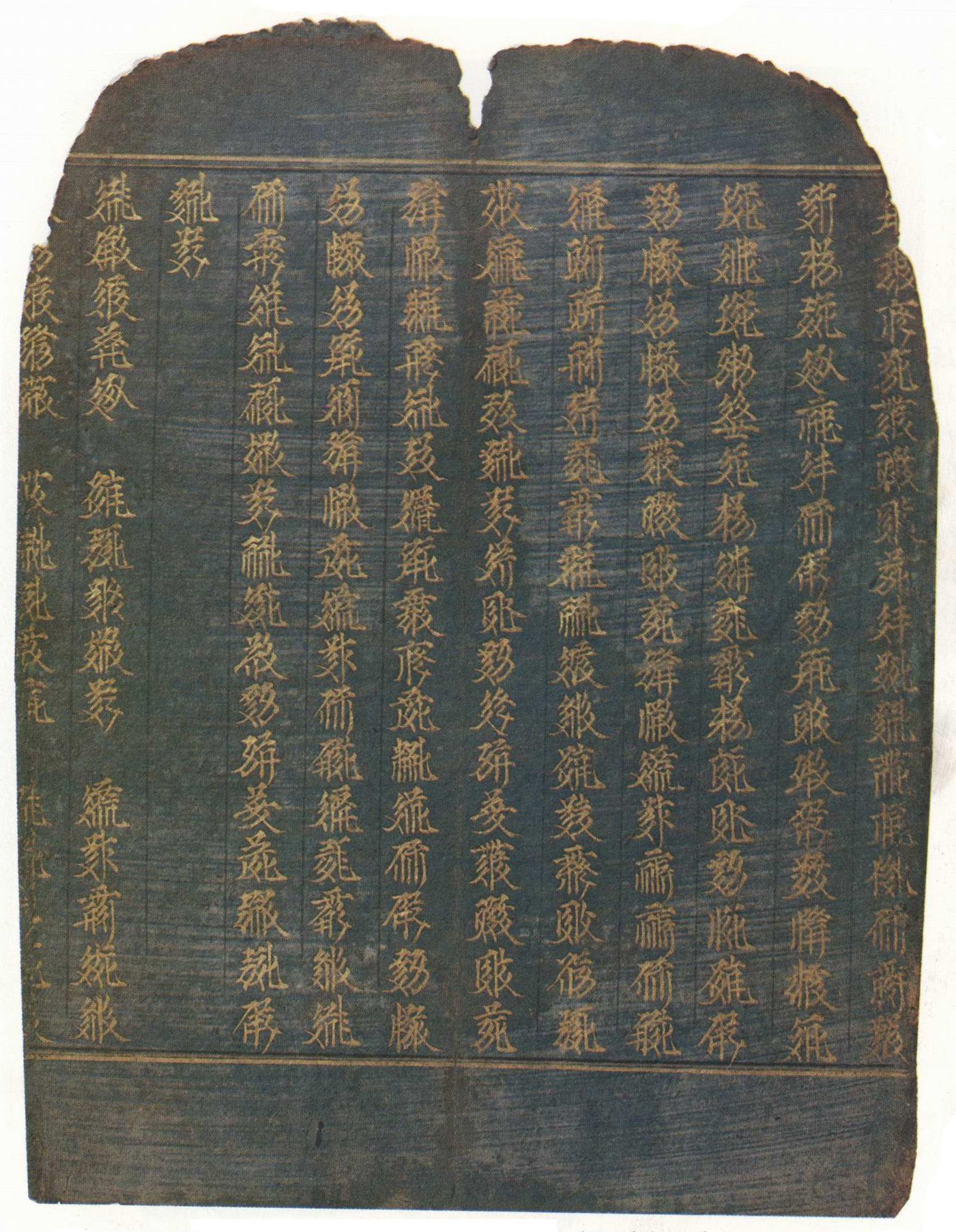
The Golden Light Sutra written in the Tangut script

== See also ==
- Eastern Xia
- Ethnic groups in Chinese history
- History of Central Asia
- History of China
- Hongfo Pagoda
- Khara-Khoto
- List of Tangut books
- One Hundred and Eight Stupas
- Tangut people
- Tangutology
