= Timeline of the Tanguts =

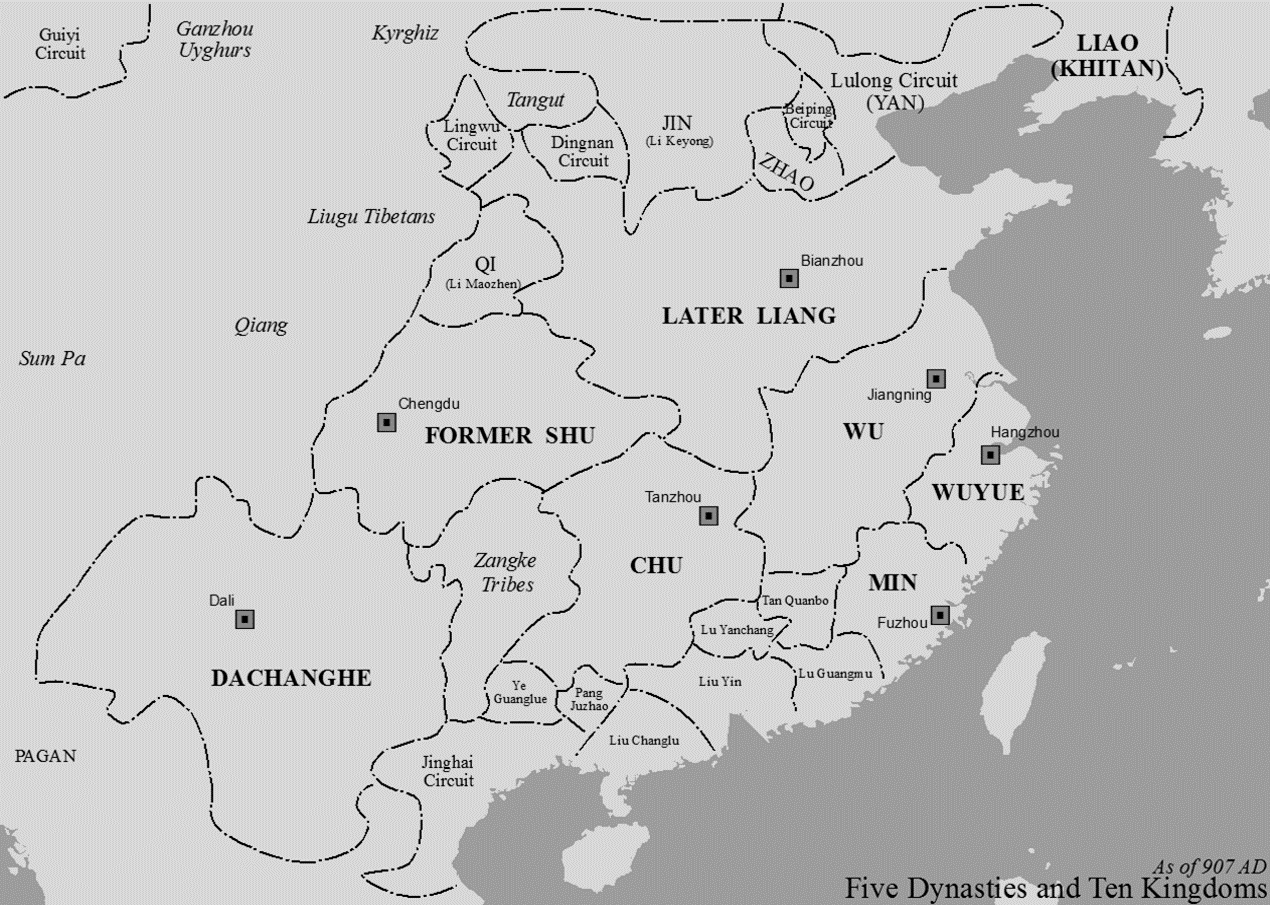
Dingnan Jiedushi

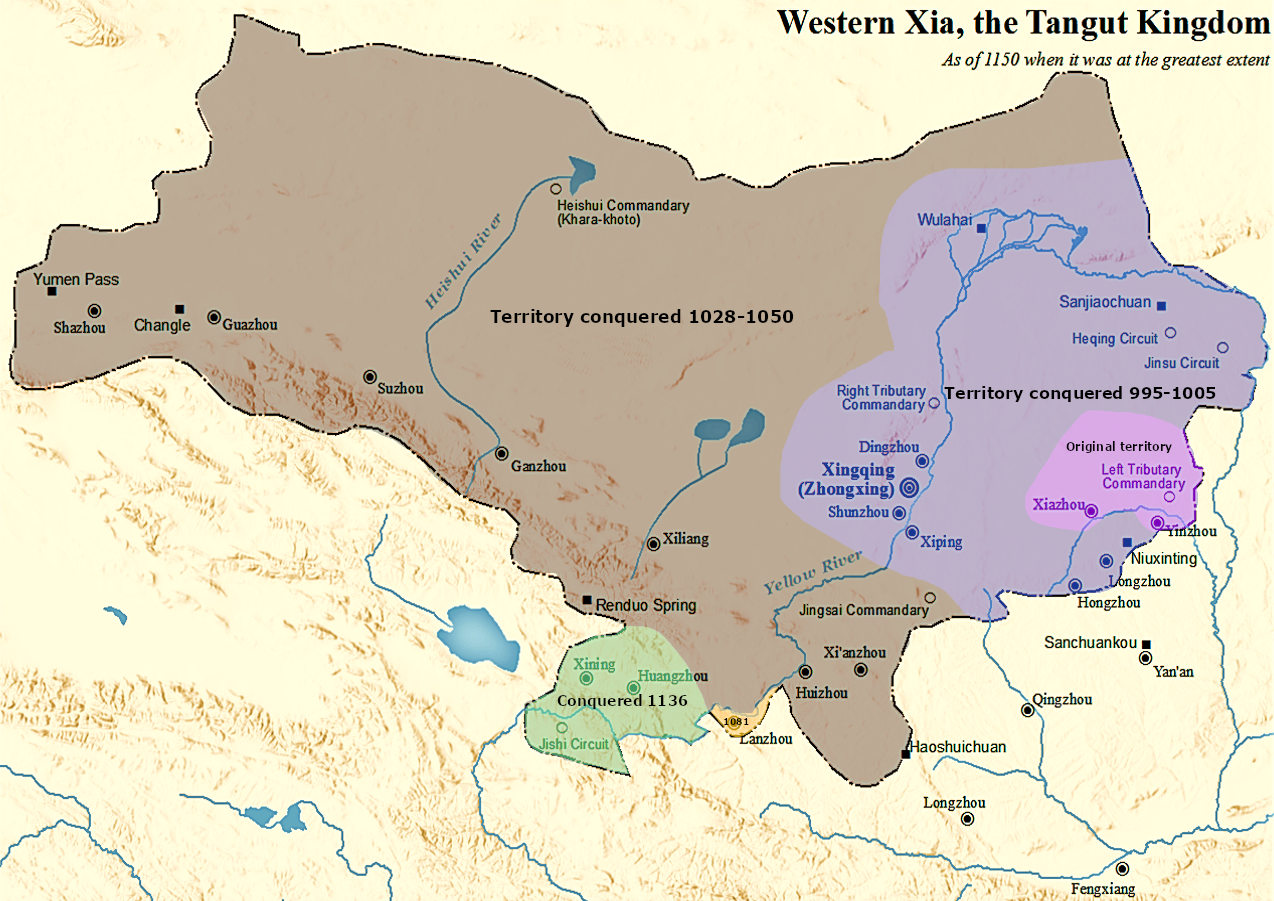
Western Xia

This is a timeline of the Tangut people and the Western Xia dynasty.

== 7th century ==
=== 620s ===
Year	Date	Event
628		Xifeng Bulai submits to the Tang dynasty

=== 630s ===
Year	Date	Event
630		The Tang dynasty bestows the imperial surname, Li, upon the Tanguts living in modern Yulin, Shaanxi
635		Tuoba Chizi submits to the Tang dynasty

=== 680s ===
Year	Date	Event
680		Tanguts flee the Kokonor region due to Tibetan pressure

=== 690s ===
Year	Date	Event
692		Tanguts migrate to Lingzhou and Xiazhou

== 8th century ==
=== 720s ===
Year	Date	Event
721		A Sogdian revolt in the Ordos region is suppressed with the help of Tanguts

=== 730s ===
Year	Date	Event
735		The name Tangut appears among the Orkhon inscriptions

== 9th century ==
=== 870s ===
Year	Date	Event
873		Li Sigong occupies Yuzhou
878		Li Guochang attacks the Tanguts

=== 880s ===
Year	Date	Event
881		The Tangut general Li Sigong assists the Tang dynasty in putting down the Huang Chao rebellion, and as a result receives Xiazhou, Suizhou, and Yinzhou as hereditary titles under the Dingnan Jiedushi

=== 890s ===
Year	Date	Event
895		Li Sigong dies and his brother Li Sijian succeeds him

== 10th century ==
=== 900s ===
Year	Date	Event
908		Li Sijian dies and his adopted son Li Yichang succeeds him
909		Li Yichang dies in a mutiny and his uncle Li Renfu succeeds him

=== 910s ===
Year	Date	Event
910		Li Maozhen and Li Cunxu lay siege to Xiazhou but Later Liang repels the attackers

=== 930s ===
Year	Date	Event
933		Li Renfu dies and his son Li Yichao succeeds him
933		An Congjin of the Later Tang lays siege to Xiazhou but fails
933		Khitans attack the Tanguts
935		Li Yichao dies and his brother Li Yixing succeeds him

=== 940s ===
Year	Date	Event
943		Li Yimin rebels against his brother Li Yixing and is defeated
948		The Yemu people rebel
949		Later Han gives Qingzhou to the Dingnan Jiedushi

=== 950s ===
Year	Date	Event
952		The Yezhi people rebel
954		Li Yixing becomes "Prince of Xiping"

=== 960s ===
Year	Date	Event
967		Li Yixing dies and his son Li Kerui succeeds him
967		The Song dynasty recognizes the Dingnan Jiedushi as an autonomous state

=== 970s ===
Year	Date	Event
978		Li Kerui dies and his son Li Jiyun succeeds him

=== 980s ===
Year	Date	Event
980		Li Jiyun dies and his brother Li Jipeng succeeds him
982		Jiqian's rebellion: Li Jipeng of the Dingnan Jiedushi surrenders to the Song, but his cousin Li Jiqian rebels
983		Jiqian's rebellion: Li Jiqian and his cohort flee to the northern deserts
985		Jiqian's rebellion: Li Jiqian takes Yinzhou
986		Li Jiqian submits to the Khitans
989		Li Jiqian marries a princess of the Khitans

=== 990s ===
Year	Date	Event
990		Jiqian's rebellion: Li Jiqian conquers northern Shaanxi and accepts the title "King of the Xia State" (夏國王) from the Liao emperor.
991		Jiqian's rebellion: Li Jiqian calls upon the Tanguts to rebel against the Song dynasty
992		Jiqian's rebellion: Khitans attack the Tanguts
993		Jiqian's rebellion: Song dynasty bans Tangut salt from entering their borders
994		Jiqian's rebellion: Song dynasty deposes Li Jiqian
996		Jiqian's rebellion: Li Jiqian rebels with Tanguts and raids Song supplies
998		Jiqian's rebellion: Song dynasty legitimizes Li Jiqian as governor of Dingnan Jiedushi

== 11th century ==
=== 1000s ===
Year	Date	Event
1001		Tanguts capture Ordos
1002		Dingnan Jiedushi conquers Lingzhou, renames it Xiping, and makes it their capital
1004	6 January	Li Jiqian dies in battle against the Tibetan state of Xiliangfu and his son Li Deming succeeds him
1004		Li Jipeng dies at the Song court
1008		Dingnan Jiedushi attacks the Ganzhou Uyghur Kingdom
1009		Dingnan Jiedushi attacks the Ganzhou Uyghur Kingdom

=== 1010s ===
Year	Date	Event
1010		Dingnan Jiedushi attacks the Ganzhou Uyghur Kingdom
1010		Tanguts request famine relief from the Song
1015		Dingnan Jiedushi takes Liangzhou from Xiliangfu but is ousted by the Ganzhou Uyghur Kingdom
1018		Khitans attack Dingnan Jiedushi but fail

=== 1020s ===
Year	Date	Event
1020		The Khitans attack the Tanguts but fail
1022		Li Deming moves the capital to Xingzhou
1028		Dingnan Jiedushi annexes the Ganzhou Uyghur Kingdom

=== 1030s ===
Year	Date	Event
1032		Li Deming dies and his son Li Yuanhao succeeds him as ruler of Dingnan Jiedushi
1032		Dingnan Jiedushi annexes Xiliangfu
1034		Li Yuanhao enacts the head shaving decree, allowing crowds to kill those who have not shaved their heads within 3 days
1034		Li Yuanhao raids Song dynasty
1036		Dingnan Jiedushi annexes the Guiyi Circuit, however Shazhou remains autonomous until 1052
1037		Li Yuanhao introduces a new Tangut script
1038	10 November	Li Yuanhao declares himself Emperor Jingzong of Western Xia and renames Xingzhou to Xingqingfu
1039		Western Xia attacks Song dynasty but is repulsed

=== 1040s ===
Year	Date	Event
1040		Song-Xia War (1040–1044): Western Xia invades Song dynasty
1042		Song-Xia War (1040–1044): Western Xia conducts a full-scale invasion of Song dynasty but is repelled
1043		Song-Xia War (1040–1044): Western Xia attacks the Khitans
1044		Song-Xia War (1040–1044): Khitans attack Western Xia but fail
1044		Song-Xia War (1040–1044): Western Xia and Song dynasty cease hostilities in return for an annual payment of silk, silver, and tea from the Song
1048		Emperor Jingzong of Western Xia is assassinated and factional civil war ensues; his son Li Liangzuo becomes the nominal ruler Emperor Yizong of Western Xia
1049		Khitans attack Western Xia

=== 1050s ===
Year	Date	Event
1050		Khitans attack Western Xia and exact tribute
1052		Western Xia seizes Shazhou

=== 1060s ===
Year	Date	Event
1061		Civil war ends and Emperor Yizong of Western Xia secures the throne
1064		Yizong raids: Western Xia raids Song dynasty
1066		Yizong raids: Western Xia raids Song dynasty
1067		Song dynasty seizes Suizhou
1068		Emperor Yizong of Western Xia dies and his son Li Bingchang succeeds him as Emperor Huizong of Western Xia; Emperess Liang becomes regent

=== 1070s ===
Year	Date	Event
1070		Western Xia attacks the Song dynasty
1076		Trade of gunpowder ingredients with the Liao dynasty and Western Xia is outlawed by the Song dynasty

=== 1080s ===
Year	Date	Event
1081		Song-Xia War (1081–1085): Song dynasty invades Western Xia with initial success, but the odd failure to bring siege weapons and extreme supply problems cause widespread mutiny and the invasion turns into a massive rout, however Song forces retained Lanzhou
1081		Emperess Liang places Emperor Huizong of Western Xia under house arrest
1083		Emperess Liang restores Emperor Huizong of Western Xia to the throne
1086		Emperor Huizong of Western Xia dies and his son Li Qianshun becomes Emperor Chongzong of Western Xia
1089		Song and Western Xia conclude a peace treaty

=== 1090s ===
Year	Date	Event
1092		Western Xia attacks Song dynasty but fails
1097		Advance and fortify: Song dynasty conducts an advance and fortify campaign against the Western Xia
1098		Advance and fortify: Western Xia retaliates against Song incursions but fails to defeat Song fortifications
1099		Advance and fortify: Western Xia sues for peace

== 12th century ==
=== 1100s ===
Year	Date	Event
1103		Song occupation of Tsongkha: Song dynasty invades Western Xia
1104		Song occupation of Tsongkha: Emperor Chongzong of Western Xia marries a Liao dynasty princess
1106		Song occupation of Tsongkha: Song dynasty and Western Xia end hostilities and the war ends inconclusively

=== 1110s ===
Year	Date	Event
1113		Song-Xia War (1113–1119): Song dynasty invades Western Xia
1119		Song-Xia War (1113–1119): The war between Song dynasty and Western Xia ends inconclusively

=== 1120s ===
Year	Date	Event
1122		Western Xia sends an army in the aid of the Liao dynasty against the Jurchen Jin dynasty but fails
1123		Western Xia sends an army in the aid of the Liao dynasty against the Jurchen Jin dynasty but fails
1124		Jin dynasty vassalizes the Western Xia
1125	26 March	Emperor Tianzuo of Liao is captured by the Jin dynasty; so ends the Liao dynasty

=== 1130s ===
Year	Date	Event
1136		Western Xia conquers the Kokonor region
1139		Emperor Chongzong of Western Xia dies and his son Li Renxiao succeeds him as Emperor Renzong of Western Xia
1139		The earliest extant text printed using wooden movable type, the Auspicious Tantra of All-Reaching Union, is printed

=== 1140s ===
Year	Date	Event
1140		Khitan exiles rebel under Li Heda and are defeated
1142		Famine and an earthquake strike the capital region killing tens of thousands
1144		Emperor Renzong of Western Xia introduces Confucian institutions into the government
1147		Western Xia starts holding imperial examinations

=== 1170s ===
Year	Date	Event
1170	11 October	Ren Dejing is executed for conspiring against the Western Xia
1178		Western Xia attacks the Jin dynasty

=== 1190s ===
Year	Date	Event
1193		Emperor Renzong of Western Xia dies and his son Li Chunyu succeeds him as Emperor Huanzong of Western Xia

== 13th century ==
=== 1200s ===
Year	Date	Event
1205	spring	Mongol conquest of Western Xia: Temujin of the Mongols raids Western Xia
1206		Emperor Huanzong of Western Xia is deposed by his cousin Li Anquan who becomes Emperor Xiangzong of Western Xia
1206	spring	Kokochu, also known as Teb Tengri, chief shaman of the Mongols, bestows upon Temüjin the title of Genghis Khan, "Oceanic Ruler" of the Mongol Empire, at the kurultai of Burkhan Khaldun, sacred mountain of the Mongols
1207		Mongol conquest of Western Xia: Mongols raid Western Xia
1209	autumn	Mongol conquest of Western Xia: Mongols invade the Hexi Corridor and defeat a Tangut army before laying siege to Zhongxing, however they accidentally flood their own camp in the process of breaking the Yellow River dikes and are forced to retreat

=== 1210s ===
Year	Date	Event
1210		Mongol conquest of Western Xia: Emperor Xiangzong of Western Xia submits to the Mongols and hands over a daughter in marriage to Genghis Khan as well as a large supply of camels, falcons, and woven textiles
1211		Emperor Xiangzong of Western Xia dies and is succeeded by his cousin Li Zunxu who becomes Emperor Shenzong of Western Xia
1217		Western Xia invades Jin dynasty but is repelled
1219		Western Xia refuses to send auxiliaries for the Mongol Empire's western campaigns

=== 1220s ===
Year	Date	Event
1223		Emperor Shenzong of Western Xia abdicates to his son Li Dewang who becomes Emperor Xianzong of Western Xia
1225		Jin and Western Xia cease hostilities
1226	spring	Mongol conquest of Western Xia: Genghis Khan attacks Western Xia
1226		Emperor Xianzong of Western Xia dies and a kinsman Li Xian succeeds him as Emperor Mozhu of Western Xia
1227	September	Emperor Mozhu of Western Xia surrenders to the Mongol Empire and is promptly executed; so ends the Western Xia
1227		Tanguts flee to Kangding, Henan, and Hebei

== 15th century ==
=== 1430s ===
Year	Date	Event
1430 or 1432	15th day of 1st month	Tangut translation of the High King Avalokitesvara Sutra 𗣛𘟙𗯨𗙏𘝯𗖰𗚩 (Chinese: 高王觀世音經; pinyin: Gāowáng Guānshìyīn Jīng) is printed. This is the latest dated printed text in Tangut.

== 16th century ==
=== 1500s ===
Year	Date	Event
1502		Two octagonal dhāraṇī pillars engraved with the Tangut version of the Dharani-Sutra of the Victorious Buddha-Crown are erected at the Temple of Promoting Goodness 𘍨𗫍𗁫 (Chinese: 興善寺; pinyin: Xīngshànsì) in Baoding. These are the latest dated texts in Tangut.

== Bibliography ==
- Andrade, Tonio (2016), The Gunpowder Age: China, Military Innovation, and the Rise of the West in World History, Princeton University Press, ISBN 978-0-691-13597-7.
- Asimov, M.S. (1998), History of civilizations of Central Asia Volume IV The age of achievement: A.D. 750 to the end of the fifteenth century Part One The historical, social and economic setting, UNESCO Publishing
- Barfield, Thomas (1989), The Perilous Frontier: Nomadic Empires and China, Basil Blackwell
- Barrett, Timothy Hugh (2008), The Woman Who Discovered Printing, Great Britain: Yale University Press, ISBN 978-0-300-12728-7 (alk. paper)
- Beckwith, Christopher I. (2009), Empires of the Silk Road: A History of Central Eurasia from the Bronze Age to the Present, Princeton University Press, ISBN 978-0-691-13589-2
- Beckwith, Christopher I (1987), The Tibetan Empire in Central Asia: A History of the Struggle for Great Power among Tibetans, Turks, Arabs, and Chinese during the Early Middle Ages, Princeton University Press
- Biran, Michal (2005), The Empire of the Qara Khitai in Eurasian History: Between China and the Islamic World, Cambridge Studies in Islamic Civilization, Cambridge, England: Cambridge University Press, ISBN 0521842263
- Bregel, Yuri (2003), An Historical Atlas of Central Asia, Brill
- Drompp, Michael Robert (2005), Tang China And The Collapse Of The Uighur Empire: A Documentary History, Brill
- Ebrey, Patricia Buckley (1999), The Cambridge Illustrated History of China, Cambridge: Cambridge University Press, ISBN 0-521-66991-X (paperback).
- Ebrey, Patricia Buckley; Walthall, Anne; Palais, James B. (2006), East Asia: A Cultural, Social, and Political History, Boston: Houghton Mifflin, ISBN 0-618-13384-4
- Golden, Peter B. (1992), An Introduction to the History of the Turkic Peoples: Ethnogenesis and State-Formation in Medieval and Early Modern Eurasia and the Middle East, OTTO HARRASSOWITZ · WIESBADEN
- Graff, David A. (2002), Medieval Chinese Warfare, 300-900, Warfare and History, London: Routledge, ISBN 0415239559
- Graff, David Andrew (2016), The Eurasian Way of War Military Practice in Seventh-Century China and Byzantium, Routledge, ISBN 978-0-415-46034-7.
- Haywood, John (1998), Historical Atlas of the Medieval World, AD 600-1492, Barnes & Noble
- Latourette, Kenneth Scott (1964), The Chinese, their history and culture, Volumes 1-2, Macmillan
- Lorge, Peter A. (2008), The Asian Military Revolution: from Gunpowder to the Bomb, Cambridge University Press, ISBN 978-0-521-60954-8
- Luttwak, Edward N. (2009), The Grand Strategy of the Byzantine Empire, The Belknap Press of Harvard University Press
- Millward, James (2009), Eurasian Crossroads: A History of Xinjiang, Columbia University Press
- Mote, F. W. (2003), Imperial China: 900–1800, Harvard University Press, ISBN 978-0674012127
- Needham, Joseph (1986), Science & Civilisation in China, vol. V:7: The Gunpowder Epic, Cambridge University Press, ISBN 0-521-30358-3
- Rong, Xinjiang (2013), Eighteen Lectures on Dunhuang, Brill
- Schafer, Edward H. (1985), The Golden Peaches of Samarkand: A study of T'ang Exotics, University of California Press
- Shaban, M. A. (1979), The ʿAbbāsid Revolution, Cambridge: Cambridge University Press, ISBN 0-521-29534-3
- Sima, Guang (2015), Bóyángbǎn Zīzhìtōngjiàn 54 huánghòu shīzōng 柏楊版資治通鑑54皇后失蹤, Yuǎnliú chūbǎnshìyè gǔfèn yǒuxiàn gōngsī, ISBN 978-957-32-0876-1
- Skaff, Jonathan Karam (2012), Sui-Tang China and Its Turko-Mongol Neighbors: Culture, Power, and Connections, 580-800 (Oxford Studies in Early Empires), Oxford University Press
- Standen, Naomi (2007), Unbounded Loyalty Frontier Crossings in Liao China, University of Hawai'i Press
- Steinhardt, Nancy Shatzman (1997), Liao Architecture, University of Hawaii Press
- Twitchett, Denis C. (1979), The Cambridge History of China, Vol. 3, Sui and T'ang China, 589–906, Cambridge University Press
- Twitchett, Denis (1994), "The Liao", The Cambridge History of China, Volume 6, Alien Regime and Border States, 907-1368, Cambridge: Cambridge University Press, pp. 43–153, ISBN 0521243319
- Twitchett, Denis (2009), The Cambridge History of China Volume 5 The Sung dynasty and its Predecessors, 907-1279, Cambridge University Press
- Wang, Zhenping (2013), Tang China in Multi-Polar Asia: A History of Diplomacy and War, University of Hawaii Press
- Wilkinson, Endymion (2015). Chinese History: A New Manual, 4th edition. Cambridge, MA: Harvard University Asia Center distributed by Harvard University Press. ISBN 9780674088467.
- Xiong, Victor Cunrui (2000), Sui-Tang Chang'an: A Study in the Urban History of Late Medieval China (Michigan Monographs in Chinese Studies), U OF M CENTER FOR CHINESE STUDIES, ISBN 0892641371
- Xiong, Victor Cunrui (2009), Historical Dictionary of Medieval China, United States of America: Scarecrow Press, Inc., ISBN 978-0810860537
- Xu, Elina-Qian (2005), HISTORICAL DEVELOPMENT OF THE PRE-DYNASTIC KHITAN, Institute for Asian and African Studies 7
- Xue, Zongzheng (1992), Turkic peoples, 中国社会科学出版社
- Yuan, Shu (2001), Bóyángbǎn Tōngjiàn jìshìběnmò 28 dìèrcìhuànguánshídài 柏楊版通鑑記事本末28第二次宦官時代, Yuǎnliú chūbǎnshìyè gǔfèn yǒuxiàn gōngsī, ISBN 957-32-4273-7
- Yule, Henry (1915), Cathay and the Way Thither: Being a Collection of Medieval Notices of China, Vol I: Preliminary Essay on the Intercourse Between China and the Western Nations Previous to the Discovery of the Cape Route, Hakluyt Society
