= Xiliangfu =

Former Tibetan tribal confederacy

Xiliangfu 西涼府
- 906–1016
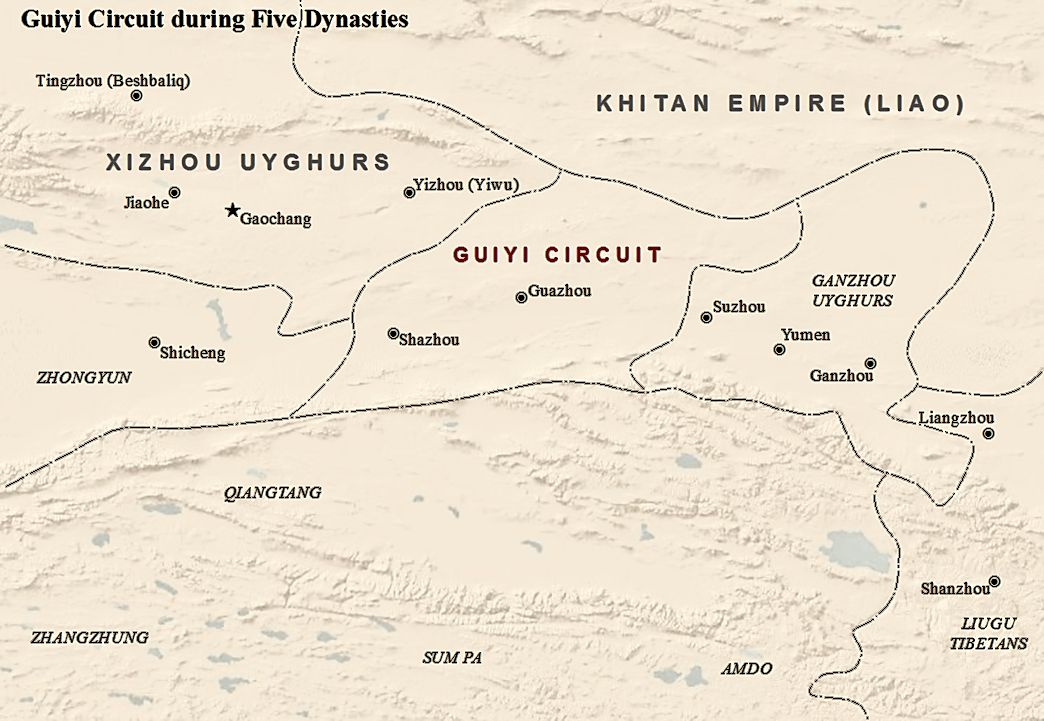
- Status: Tribal Confederation
- Capital: Liangzhou (modern Wuwei)
- Common languages: Tibetan
- Religion: Buddhism
- Government: Tribal
- History
  - Established: 906
  - Disestablished: 1016
Preceded by	Succeeded by
Guiyi Circuit	Western Xia; Tsongkha

Xiliangfu (Chinese: 西涼府), also known as Liangzhou, Lingchu Serkap, or the Liugu Tibetans (Chinese: 六谷部), was a Tibetan tribal confederation that ruled modern Wuwei in Gansu Province, China. It gained independence from the Guiyi Circuit in the late 9th century and was conquered by the Tanguts of Western Xia and Uyghurs in 1015 and 1016.

== History ==
In 996, Tanguts began raiding Liangzhou.

In 998, Xiliangfu had a population of 128,000.

In 1001, Panluozhi came to power.

In 1003, Li Jiqian occupied Liangzhou but failed to hold the city when their forces fell to a Tibetan ambush.

In 1004, Panluozhi was assassinated by Tanguts and his brother Siduodu succeeded him.

In 1006 and several of the following years, Liangzhou suffered from plague.

In 1015, the Tanguts captured Liangzhou.

In 1016, the Ganzhou Uyghur Kingdom ousted the Tanguts from Liangzhou.

Around 1032, the Tanguts annexed Liangzhou again.

== Bibliography ==
- Ryavec, Karl E. (2015), A Historical Atlas of Tibet
- Tuttle, Gray (2013), The Tibetan History Reader, Columbia University Press
- Twitchett, Denis (1994), The Cambridge History of China, Volume 6, Alien Regime and Border States, 907-1368, Cambridge: Cambridge University Press, ISBN 0521243319
