= Li Yixing =

Dangxiang warlord

Li Yixing (Chinese: 李彝興; died October 20, 967), né Li Yiyin (李彝殷), noble title Prince of Xia (夏王), was an ethnic Tangut warlord who ruled Dingnan Circuit (headquartered in modern-day Yulin, Shaanxi) from 935 to his death in 967, as its military governor (Jiedushi). Despite his de facto independence, he nominally submitted to the Later Tang, Later Jin, Later Han, Later Zhou, and Northern Song dynasties.

== Background ==
It is not known when Li Yiyin was born. It is known that he was a son of Li Renfu, who ruled Dingnan Circuit as military governor from 909/910 to 933, and a brother of Li Yichao, who ruled the circuit as military governor from 933 to 935, but it is not clear whether he was an older brother to Li Yichao (as asserted by the Zizhi Tongjian) or a younger brother (as asserted by the Old History of the Five Dynasties, the New History of the Five Dynasties, and the History of Song). If he were an older brother, then he might have been the Dingnan general referred to in historical records by the nickname of "Prince Aluo" (阿囉王) in 933, when Li Yichao resisted Later Tang's attempt to dislodge him from Dingnan, as Li Yichao was said to be Li Renfu's second son. In any case, during Li Yichao's rule, Li Yiyin served as the commander of the Dingnan army (行軍司馬, Xingjun Sima). When Li Yichao fell ill in 935, he transferred his authorities to Li Yiyin, and then died. Shortly after, then-Later Tang emperor Li Congke commissioned Li Yiyin as the military governor of Dingnan.

== As military governor ==
=== During Later Jin ===
In 943—by which time Later Tang had fallen and its former territory was reigned by the Later Jin's emperor Shi Chonggui—there was a plot for an uprising against Li Yiyin's rule, from within Dingnan itself, led by the commander of the headquarters guards, Tuoba Chongbin (拓跋崇斌). Also part of the plot was Li Yimin (李彝敏) the prefect of Sui Prefecture (綏州, in modern Yulin, part of Dingnan). (Based on Li Yimin's name and position, he was likely a younger brother or cousin of Li Yiyin's.) When the plot was discovered, Li Yimin and five younger brothers fled to Yan Prefecture (延州, in modern Yan'an, Shanxi). Li Yiyin thereafter submitted a petition to Shi, accusing Li Yimin of treason. In order to placate Li Yiyin, Shi arrested and delivered Li Yimin to Dingnan's capital Xia Prefecture (夏州), and Li Yimin was executed.

In 944, during a time that there were major military confrontations between Later Jin and its northern rival, the Khitan Liao dynasty, which was at that time aiding Yang Guangyuan, a Later Jin general who had rebelled at Pinglu Circuit (平盧, headquartered in modern Weifang, Shandong), Li Yiyin submitted a report to Shi indicating that he had taken his 40,000 men and made an incursion into Liao territory, across the Yellow River, from his Lin Prefecture (麟州, in modern Yulin). Shi gave him the title of the commander of southwestern forces against the Khitan.

=== During Later Han ===
In 948—by which time Later Jin had fallen and its former territory was reigned by Later Han's emperor Liu Chengyou—there was an incident in which Li Yiyin mobilized his troops and claimed that he wanted to launch an attack against the Qiang chieftain Yemu (㖡母), stating that three years prior, Yemu had ambushed and killed Sui's prefect Li Renyu (李仁裕) (who, based on name and position, was likely an uncle). The nearby Qing Prefecture (慶州, in modern Qingyang, Gansu), recommended that the Later Han imperial government take precautions (apparently distrusting Li Yiyin's intentions). Liu issued an edict, urging Li Yiyin to stand down, using the rationale that the imperial astronomers had stated that the year was, as a matter of astrology, unsuitable for military actions. That apparently defused the tensions at that time.

Later in the year, the Later Han general Li Shouzhen rebelled at his Huguo Circuit (護國, headquartered in modern Yuncheng, Shanxi). Knowing that Li Yiyin had a rivalry with Gao Yunquan (高允權) the military governor of nearby Zhangwu Circuit (彰武, headquartered at Yan Prefecture), Li Shouzhen sent secret emissaries to encourage Li Yiyin to attack Zhangwu. Li Yiyin mobilized his troops and sent them to the borders with Zhangwu, but thereafter, hearing that the Later Han imperial forces, under the command of Guo Wei, had put Huguo's capital Hezhong Municipality (河中) under siege, he withdrew. Gao subsequently submitted an accusation against Li Yiyin to the Later Han imperial government, and Li Yiyin submitted a defense of himself. The Later Han imperial government merely issued statements urging the two circuits to be peaceful with each other. To further placate Li Yiyin, who had developed a reputation for encouraging rebellions so that he could benefit from them, the Later Han imperial government further allocated Jing Prefecture (靜州, in modern Yinchuan, Ningxia) to him in 949. After Guo captured Hezhong and Li Shouzhen committed suicide thereafter, Liu, at Guo's request, bestowed honors on many regional governors, and Li Yiyin received the honorary chancellor title Zhongshu Ling (中書令).

=== During Later Zhou/Northern Han ===
In 951, Guo Wei seized the Later Han throne (with Liu Chengyou having been killed earlier after provoking Guo to rebel), establishing Later Zhou. Liu Chengyou's uncle Liu Chong (who soon thereafter changed his name to Liu Min), however, declared himself the emperor and the legitimate successor to the throne of Later Han, at his Hedong Circuit (河東, headquartered in modern Taiyuan, Shanxi)—although his state is historically generally considered a new separate state (Northern Han) rather than part of the history of Later Han. Li Yiyin initially submitted to Liu Min as a vassal. However, by the time of the middle of the Xiande era (954–963) (which was used by Guo Wei, his adoptive son Guo Rong, and his adoptive grandson (Guo Rong's son) Guo Zongxun), Li Yiyin had apparently submitted to Later Zhou as a vassal, for by that point he carried the Later Zhou-bestowed title of acting Taifu (太傅), in addition to Zhongshu Ling, and had also been created the Prince of Xiping by a Later Zhou emperor. (It is not clear whether Li Yiyin also continued to maintain a sovereign-vassal relationship with Liu Min and his son and successor Liu Jun.)

=== During Song ===
In 960, the Later Zhou general Zhao Kuangyin seized the throne from the young emperor Guo Zongxun, ending Later Zhou and starting Song dynasty as its Emperor Taizu. He bestowed the title of acting Taiwei (太尉) on Li Yiyin. Shortly after, Li Yiyin changed his name to Li Yixing, to observe naming taboo for Emperor Taizu's father Zhao Hongyin (趙弘殷). Later in the year, there was apparently an attempt by Northern Han to have its non-Han Chinese tribal troops pillage modern northern Shaanxi region, west of the Yellow River; Li Yixing launched sent his officer Li Yiyu (李彝玉) (probably a brother or a cousin) to Lin Prefecture, which apparently came under siege by the Northern Han forces, and the Northern Han forces withdrew.

In 962, Li Yixing offered 300 horses as a tribute to Emperor Taizu. Emperor Taizu, in return, had a jade belt made to award to Li. When he asked Li's emissary what Li's waist size was, Li's emissary responded that Li had a very wide waist. Emperor Taizu responded, "Your commander is a blessed person." (Traditionally, Chinese considered those who have large abdomens to be blessed.) It was said that Li was touched by this gesture.

Li Yixing died in 967. Emperor Taizu posthumously created him the greater title of Prince of Xia, and subsequently commissioned his son Li Kerui as the new military governor of Dingnan.

== Notes and references ==
- Old History of the Five Dynasties, vol. 132.
- New History of the Five Dynasties, vol. 40.
- History of Song, vol. 485.
- Zizhi Tongjian, vols. 279, 283, 284, 288, 290.
- Xu Zizhi Tongjian, vols. 1, 2, 5.
