= Li Yichao =

Li Yichao (Chinese: 李彝超; died 935), né Tuoba Yichao (拓跋彝超), was an ethnic Tangut warlord of the Chinese Later Tang dynasty, serving as the military governor of Dingnan Circuit (headquartered in modern-day Yulin, Shaanxi) from 933 to his death in 935 in de facto independence.

== Background ==
It is not known when Li Yichao was born. He was the second son of Li Renfu. During Li Renfu's rule of Dingnan Circuit, he served as an officer at Dingnan's capital Xia Prefecture (夏州, in modern Yulin, Shaanxi).

== Campaign against Later Tang forces ==
When Li Renfu died in 933, the officers of the circuit supported Li Yichao to succeed him, and he claimed the title of acting military governor, and thereafter sought to be officially commissioned as military governor from Later Tang.

However, Li Siyuan, the emperor of Later Tang, to which Li Renfu was formally a vassal, had long suspected Li Renfu of being in secret communications with Later Tang's northern rival the Liao dynasty, and therefore wanted to dislodge Li Yichao from Dingnan. So, he issued an edict commissioning Li Yichao as the acting military governor of nearby Zhangwu Circuit (彰武, headquartered in modern Yan'an, Shaanxi), while commissioning Zhangwu's military governor An Congjin as the acting military governor of Dingwu. He also had Yao Yanchou (藥彥稠) the military governor of Jingnan Circuit (靜難, headquartered in modern Xianyang, Shaanxi), command 50,000 soldiers, to try to escort An to Dingnan. He also issued an edict addressing the people of Dingnan, stating that he felt that Li Yichao was too young to defend the border region that Dingnan was, stating that if he followed the imperial orders, he would receive the great honors that Li Congyan and Gao Yuntao (高允韜) received (after their respective fathers' deaths) and if he disobeyed them, he would receive the disasters that Wang Du and Li Kuangbin (李匡賓) received.

Li Yichao refused to follow Li Siyuan's orders. Rather, he sent his older brother or cousin (only known historically by the nickname of Prince Aluo (阿囉王)) to defend against the Later Tang attack at Qingling Gate (青嶺門, in modern Yan'an), and also gathered up all Dangxiang tribesmen in his territory for the defense. The Later Tang forces under Yao and An put Xia Prefecture under siege. However, the city walls were said to be exceedingly firm based on original construction by Helian Bobo, and the Dangxiang tribesmen were able to effectively cut off food supply routes of the Later Tang army such that it was difficult to resupply the army. Li Yichao and his brothers went on the city walls and begged An to withdraw, stating to him:

Xia Prefecture is poor and barren, and there is little to offer to the imperial government in terms of tributes and taxes. It is only because our ancestors guarded this territory for generations that we do not wish to lose it. This city is so alone and small such that it is no great victory to prevail over it, so why is the empire spending so much resources on it? We would be fortunate to have this reported to the Emperor, such that if he allows us to correct ourselves, in future campaigns, we would willingly serve as forward troops.

Upon hearing about this plea, Li Siyuan ordered a withdrawal. It was said that from this point on, Dingnan viewed the imperial government lightly, such that whenever there were rebellions against the imperial government, it would get in communications with the rebels to demand bribes in order to aid them against the imperial government.

== As military governor of Dingnan ==
In winter 933, at Li Yichao's request, Li Siyuan formally made him the military governor of Dingnan.

In 935, Li Yichao fell ill, and he submitted a petition asking that his brother (older, according to the Zizhi Tongjian—and therefore may be the same person as Prince Aluo—or younger, according to the Old History of the Five Dynasties and the New History of the Five Dynasties), Li Yiyin, be put in charge of Dingnan. He died shortly after, and then-ruling Later Tang emperor, Li Congke (Li Siyuan's adoptive son) made Li Yiyin the military governor of Dingnan.
