= Sui Prefecture (Shaanxi) =

Historical administrative division in Shaanxi, China

Suizhou or Sui Prefecture (Chinese: Suīzhōu 綏州; Tangut: 𗉢𗉔) was a zhou (prefecture) in imperial China centering on modern Suide County, Shaanxi, China. It existed (intermittently) from 552 to 1069. In the 10th- and 11th-centuries it was mostly controlled by the Tangut people as part of Western Xia (1038–1227) or its precursor, the Dingnan Jiedushi, although it became Song dynasty territory again in 1067.

== Geography ==
The administrative region of Suizhou during the Tang dynasty is in modern northern Shaanxi. It probably includes parts of modern:

- Under the administration of Yulin:
  - Suide County
  - Wubu County
  - Qingjian County
  - Zizhou County
- Under the administration of Yan'an:
  - Zichang County
