= Xing Prefecture (Shaanxi) =

Historical administrative division in Shaanxi, China

Xingzhou or Xing Prefecture (興州) was a zhou (prefecture) in imperial China, centering on modern Lüeyang County, Shaanxi, China. It existed (intermittently) from 554 until 1207.
