= Xià Prefecture =

Historical administrative division in Shaanxi, China

Xiazhou or Xia Prefecture (Chinese: 夏州; pinyin: Xiàzhōu; Tangut: 𘒂𗉔) was a zhou (prefecture) in imperial China centering on modern Jingbian County, Shaanxi. It existed intermittently from 487 until the early 13th century, when the Mongols destroyed the Western Xia dynasty (1038–1227). From the 10th to the 12th centuries, it was mostly controlled by Tangut people as a part of Western Xia or its precursor state Dingnan Jiedushi.

== Geography ==
The administrative region of Xiazhou during the Tang dynasty is in the border area of modern northern Shaanxi and southern Inner Mongolia. It probably includes parts of modern:

- Under the administration of Yulin, Shaanxi:
  - Jingbian County
- Under the administration of Ordos City, Inner Mongolia:
  - Uxin Banner
  - Hanggin Banner
