= Yin Prefecture =

Prefecture in imperial China

Yinzhou or Yin Prefecture (Chinese: Yínzhōu 銀州; Tangut: 𗷲𗉔 or 𘝰𗉔) was a zhou (prefecture) in imperial China centering on modern Hengshan County, Shaanxi, China. It existed (intermittently) from 563 to 1106. In the 10th- and 11th-centuries it was mostly controlled by the Tangut people as part of Western Xia (1038–1227) or its precursor, the Dingnan Jiedushi. In 1081 it became territory of the Song dynasty.

== Geography ==
The administrative region of Yinzhou during the Northern Zhou is in modern Shaanxi. It probably includes parts of modern:

- Under the administration of Yulin:
  - Hengshan County
  - Mizhi County
  - Jia County
