= Qìng Prefecture =

Historical administrative region in China

Qingzhou or Qing Prefecture (慶州) was a zhou (prefecture) in imperial China centering on modern Qingyang in Gansu, China. It existed (intermittently) from 596 to 1125.

== Geography ==
The administrative region of Qingzhou in the Tang dynasty is in Qingyang in eastern Gansu near the border with Shaanxi. It probably includes parts of modern:

- Qingyang
- Heshui County
- Huachi County
- Qingcheng County
- Huan County
