= Li Deming =

Li Deming 李德明

Prince of Xia
- Reign: 1004 – 1032
- Predecessor: Li Jiqian
- Successor: Li Yuanhao
- Born: Ayi (阿移); 981
- Died: 1032
- Burial: Jialing Mausoleum (嘉陵, presumptively the No. 2 tomb of Western Xia mausoleums)
- Spouse: Lady Weimu
Names
- Li Deming (李德明)
Posthumous name
- Emperor Guangsheng (光聖皇帝)
Temple name
- Taizong (太宗)
- Father: Li Jiqian
- Mother: Lady Yeli

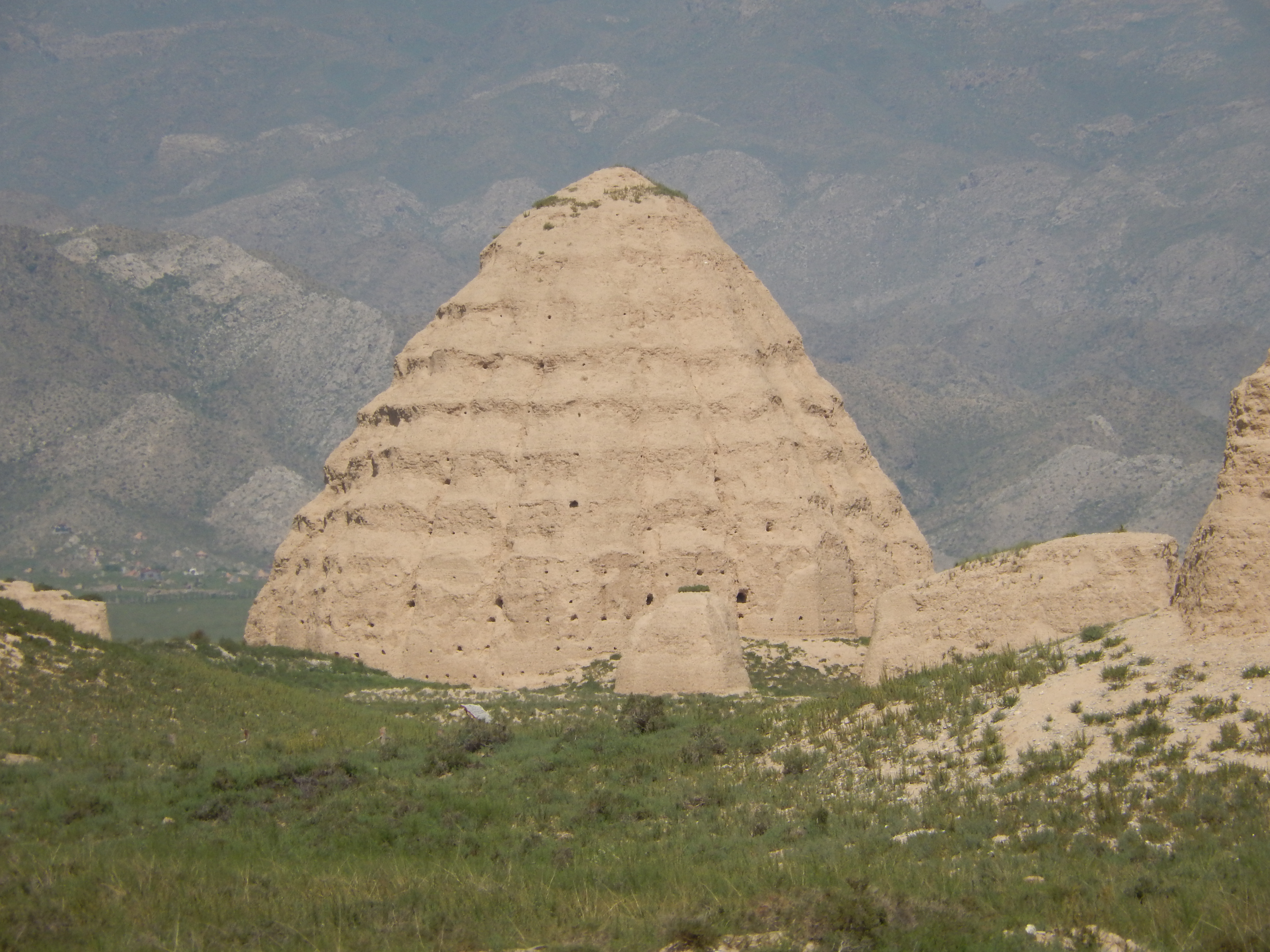
Mausoleum of Li Deming (Jialing 嘉陵)

Li Deming (Chinese: 李德明) (981–1032) was the eldest son of Li Jiqian and the father of Li Yuanhao, the founder of China's Western Xia dynasty. When his father died in battle in 1004, Li Deming became leader of the Tangut people, and over the next twenty years he considerably expanded the territory controlled by the Tanguts. In 1028, he named his son Li Yuanhao as crown prince. He died of natural causes in 1032. Li Deming was officially accorded the temple name "Taizong" (太宗) and the posthumous name "Emperor Guangsheng" (光聖皇帝) by the Western Xia dynasty.

== Family ==
- Father: Li Jiqian
- Mother: Empress Shuncheng Yixiao, of the Yeli clan (順成懿孝皇后野利氏, d.1007)
- Consorts and issue:
  - Empress Huici Dun'ai, of the Weimu clan (惠慈敦愛皇后衛穆氏, d.1034)
    - Emperor Jingzong of the Western Xia Li Yuanhao (李元昊), first son
  - Empress Dowager, of the Ezang Quhuai clan (皇太后訛藏屈懷氏)
    - Li Chengwei (李成嵬), third son
  - Lady Miemi (咩迷氏)
    - Li Chengyu (李成遇), second son
