= Li Jiqian =

Li Jiqian 李繼遷

King of Xia State (夏國王)
- Reign: 990 – 1004
- Successor: Li Deming

Dingnan Jiedushi
- Tenure: 998 – 1004
- Predecessor: Li Jipeng
- Successor: Li Deming
- Born: 963
- Died: 26 January 1004 (aged 40–41)
- Burial: Yuling Mausoleum (裕陵, presumptively the No. 1 tomb of Western Xia mausoleums)
- Spouse: Lady Yeli; Princess Yicheng of Khitan
Names
- Li Jiqian (李繼遷); Zhao Baoji (趙保吉)
Posthumous name
- Emperor Yingyun Fatian Shenzhi Rensheng Zhidao Guangde Guangxiao (應運法天神智仁聖至道廣德光孝皇帝); Emperor Shenwu (神武皇帝)
Temple name
- Wuzong (武宗); Taizu (太祖)
- Father: Li Guangyan

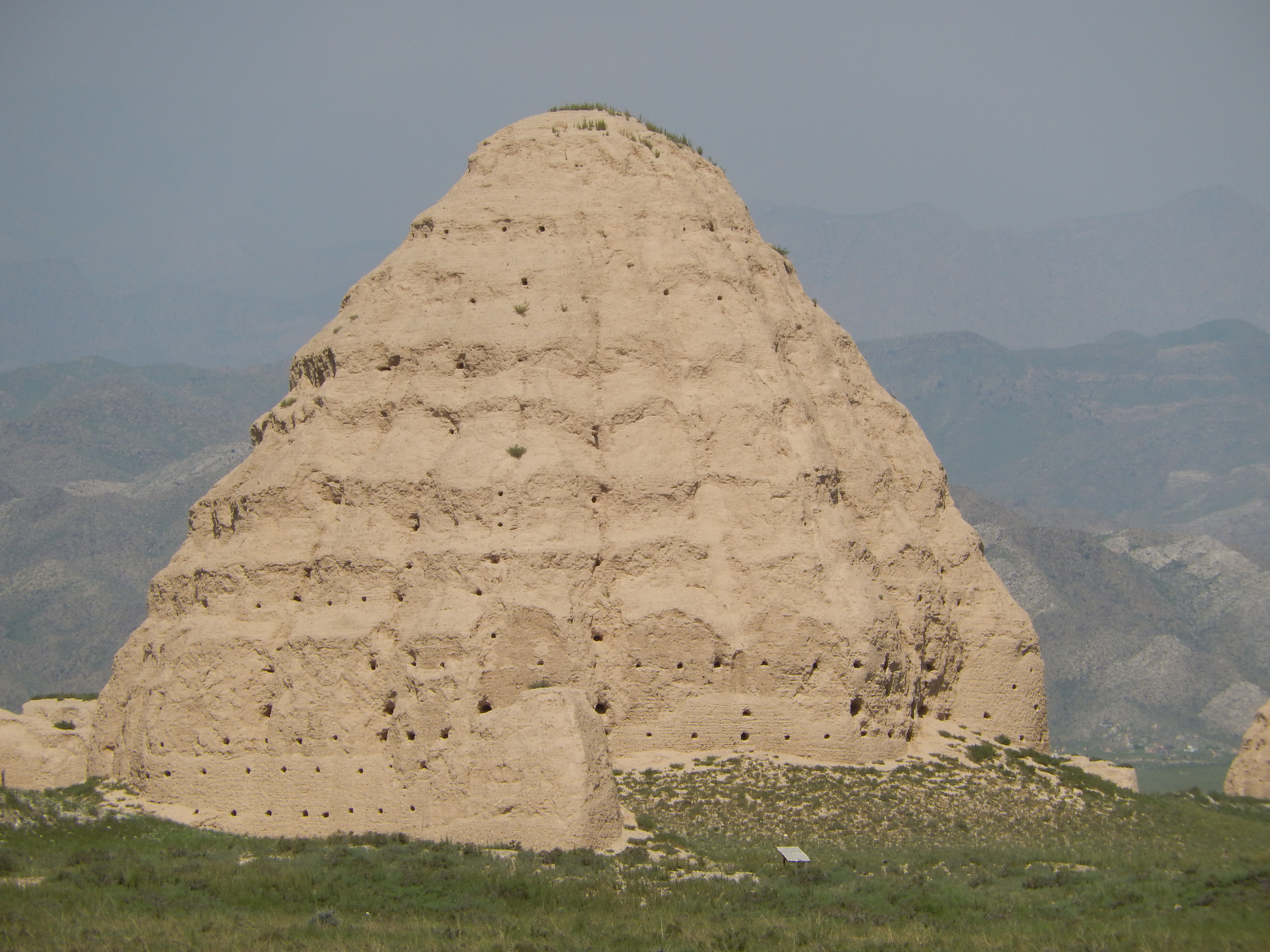
Mausoleum of Li Jiqian (Yuling 裕陵)

Li Jiqian (Chinese: 李繼遷) (963–1004), occasionally also known by his Song-bestowed name of Zhao Baoji (趙保吉), was a Tangut leader and progenitor of China's Western Xia dynasty. He resisted the Song dynasty and organized a rebellion in 984. He also created a successful alliance with the Liao dynasty for military support, received the title "King of the Xia State" (夏國王) from the Liao emperor in 990. Li Jiqian arranged a peace agreement with the Song emperor, but violated the treaty himself. To avoid costly military campaigns, Emperor Zhenzong of Song made Li Jiqian the jiedushi of Dingnan (定難節度使), and recognized Li Jiqian's new autonomous rule. He supported the construction of irrigation canals that were crucial for the development of agriculture in the arid areas of northwestern China, especially around the capital Xingqing (modern Yinchuan).

Li Jiqian was father of Li Deming, and grandfather of Li Yuanhao, the founder of the Western Xia dynasty. He was conferred the temple name "Wuzong" (武宗) and the posthumous name "Emperor Yingyun Fatian Shenzhi Rensheng Zhidao Guangde Guangxiao" (應運法天神智仁聖至道廣德光孝皇帝) by Li Deming in 1005. Later, he was honored with the temple name "Taizu" (太祖) and the posthumous name "Emperor Shenwu" (神武皇帝) by Li Yuanhao.

In 1644, Li Zicheng, founder of the short-lived Shun dynasty, gave Li Jiqian the temple name "Taizu" (太祖). Zicheng grew up in a Shaanxi village called "Li Jiqian's walled village" (李繼遷寨) and claimed to be descended from Jiqian.

== Family ==
Consorts and issue:

- Empress Shuncheng Yixiao, of the Yeli clan (順成懿孝皇后野利氏, d.1007)
  - Li Deming
- Yelü Ting, Princess Yicheng of Khitan (義成公主耶律汀)
