= Ganzhou Uyghur Kingdom =

State ruled by the Uyghur Yaglakar clan

Ganzhou Uyghur Kingdom 甘州回鶻
- 894–1036
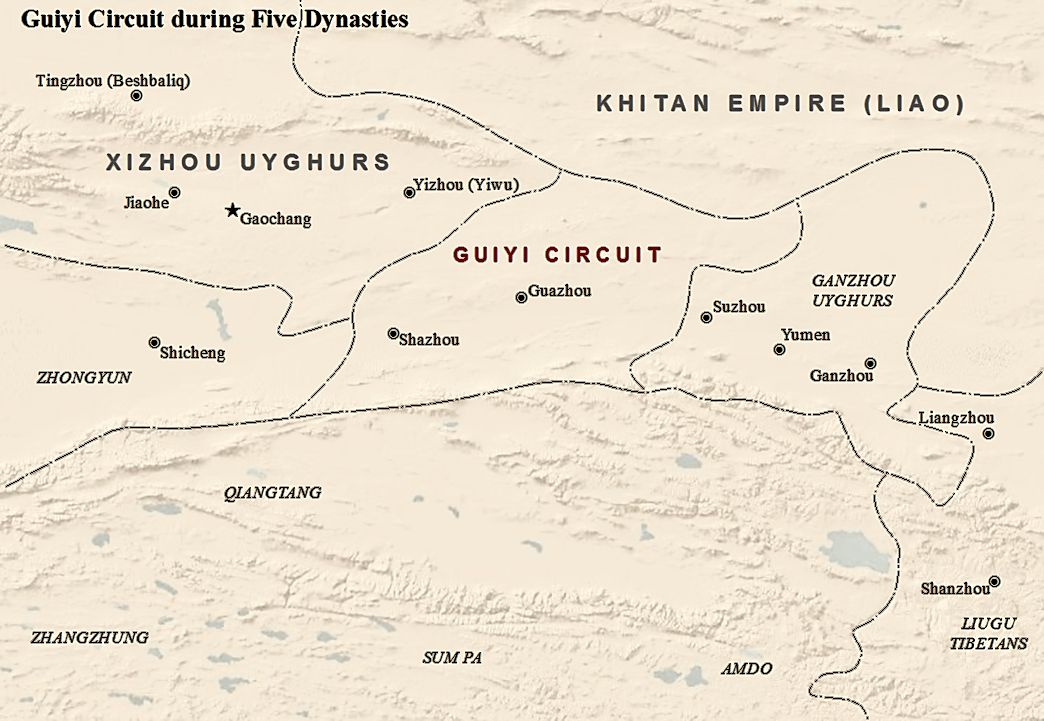
- Status: Kingdom
- Capital: Ganzhou (Zhangye)
- Common languages: Old Uyghur language Middle Chinese
- Religion: Manichaeism (official; 894 - c. 980), later Buddhism
- Government: Monarchy
- Idiqut
- History
  - Established: 894
  - Disestablished: 1036
Preceded by	Succeeded by
Uyghur Khaganate	Western Xia
- Today part of: China

The Ganzhou Uyghur Kingdom (traditional Chinese: 甘州回鶻; simplified Chinese: 甘州回鹘; pinyin: Gānzhōu Huíhú), also referred to as the Hexi Uyghurs (traditional Chinese: 河西回鶻; simplified Chinese: 河西回鹘; pinyin: Héxī Huíhú), was a Turkic dynastic state ruled by the Uyghur Yaglakar clan. It was established in 894 around Ganzhou in modern-day Zhangye, and lasted until 1036. During that time, many of Ganzhou's residents converted to Buddhism.

The Hexi Corridor, located within modern Gansu, was traditionally a Chinese inroad into Central Asia. From the 9th to 11th centuries this area was shared between the Ganzhou Uyghurs and the Guiyi Circuit. By the early 11th century both the Uyghurs and Guiyi Circuit were conquered by the Tangut people of the Western Xia dynasty.

== History ==
There was a pre-existing community of Uyghurs at Ganzhou by 840 at the very latest.

In 874, remnant forces of the Tibetan Empire known as the Wenmo, Han Chinese slave soldiers under the Tibetan Empire, in Ganzhou drove out the Uyghurs.

Around the years 881 and 882, Ganzhou slipped from the control of the Guiyi Circuit.

Remnants from the disintegrated the Uyghur Khaganate settled in Qinzhou 秦州, Liangzhou, Ganzhou, Suzhou 肅州, Guazhou 瓜州 and Shazhou 沙州. In 894 the Uyghurs led by Pangteqin (Huaijian Khagan) established the Ganzhou Uyghur Kingdom in Ganzhou.

In 902 the Ganzhou Uyghurs sent military aid to Emperor Zhaozong of Tang.

In 910 the Ganzhou Uyghurs attacked the Kingdom of Jinshan (Guiyi).

In 911 the Ganzhou Uyghurs attacked the Kingdom of Jinshan and forced them into an alliance as a lesser partner.

In 916 a Ganzhou Uyghur princess was married to Cao Yijin, governor of the Guiyi Circuit. The Guiyi Circuit regime of Dunhuang established marriage alliances, diplomatic, trade and cultural links with the Ganzhou Uyghurs.

In 920 Huaijian Khagan became sickly, and he died in 924; his sons Diyin and Renmei fought over the throne with Diyin coming out on top. They received a royal appointment from the Later Tang dynasty. The Khitans of the Liao dynasty offered to let the Ganzhou Uyghurs return to their former homeland on the Orkhon but they refused the offer.

In 925 Cao Yijin led an attack on the Ganzhou Uyghurs and defeated them.

In 926 Diyin died and Aduoyu succeeded him as Shunhua Khagan. Shunhua Khagan married Cao Yijin's daughter.

In 930 Cao Yijin visited the Ganzhou Uyghur court in Ganzhou.

In 933 Shunhua Khagan died and Jingqiong succeeded him.

In 961 the Ganzhou Uyghurs accepted the Song dynasty as suzerains. Due to freer status of women in Turkic society, the Ganzhou Kingdom often used both Buddhist monks and nuns as envoys to Song China, where Buddhist nuns were also highly patronized by the elite. The Song recognized the Ganzhou Uyghurs, as well as the Qarakhanids and the Qocho Uyghurs, as the collective descendants of the former Uyghur Khaganate. Arab sources, for example the account of Arab traveller Abū Dulaf (which may have been based on other sources of the period), seems to have referred to the Ganzhou Uyghur Kingdom as "China".

In 975 Jingqiong died and Yeluohe Mili'e succeeded him.

In 983 Jingqiong died and Lusheng succeeded him.

In 1003 Lusheng died and Zhongshun Baode Khagan succeeded him. The Tanguts attacked the Ganzhou Uyghurs but were defeated.

In 1008 the Ganzhou Uyghurs and Tanguts engaged in combat and the Uyghurs emerged victorious. The Liao dynasty attacked the Ganzhou Uyghurs and defeated them.

In 1009 the Ganzhou Uyghurs captured Liangzhou.

In 1010 the Liao dynasty attacked the Ganzhou Uyghurs and defeated them.

In 1016 Zhongshun Baode Khagan died and Huaining Shunhua Khagan succeeded him.

In 1023 Huaining Shunhua Khagan died and Guizhong Baoshun Khagan succeeded him.

In 1026 the Ganzhou Uyghurs were defeated in battle by the Liao dynasty, a defeat which weakened Uyghur control over the Hexi corridor sufficiently for the Tangut Li Yuanhao to seize control and proclaim the Western Xia. In 1028 the Ganzhou Uyghurs were defeated by the Tanguts, while Guizhong Baoshun Khagan died and Baoguo Khagan succeeded him.

In 1036 the Ganzhou Uyghur Kingdom was annexed by the Tanguts. After the destruction of their realm, the Ganzhou Uyghurs migrated and settled in Dunhuang (Shazhou) and Guazhou. The Guazhou Uyghurs surrendered to the Tanguts in 1030 and Shazhou surrendered in 1036. A record of a Huolasan Khan ruling in Shazhou in 1127 shows that the Uyghurs there retained some amount of autonomy in Western Xia. Another group that settled between Dunhuang and the Qaidam Basin came to be known as the Yellow Head Uyghurs. They practiced Buddhism and lived as pastoral nomads. In the 13th century they were called the Sali Uyghurs. Their descendants are today known as the Yugurs.

Even though they had been conquered by the Tanguts, the Ganzhou Uyghurs maintained the practice of sending trade missions to the Song court.

== Religion ==
The Uyghurs of Ganzhou originally practiced Manichaeanism as their state religion but abandoned it for Buddhism at the end of the 10th century due to pressure from the Tanguts. Like the Tanguts, they sent Buddhist pilgrimages to Mount Wutai, but the real reason for the expeditions may have been to spy on the Liao dynasty. According to Hong Hao, a Song dynasty diplomat on his way to the Jurchen Jin dynasty, the Uyghurs of the Hexi Corridor still practiced Buddhism:

The Uighur believe mostly in Buddhism. They place the (Buddhist) sculptures in the hall. At each sacrifice, they must slaughter a lamb. Some drink alcohol merrily. Then they dip their finger into the blood of the lamb and dye the mouth of the Buddha with blood. Some hold the foot of the Buddha screaming, which was meant to show intimacy and respect for the Buddha. When chanting the Scripture, they wore Kasaya (the monk’s robe) and used the Indian language.

— Hong Hao

== Modern era ==
The modern day descendants of the Ganzhou Uyghurs are known as the Yugur.

== See also ==
- Yugur
- Turkic peoples
- Timeline of the Turkic peoples (500–1300)
- Uyghur Khaganate
- Qocho

== Bibliography ==
- Asimov, M.S. (1998), History of civilizations of Central Asia Volume IV The age of achievement: A.D. 750 to the end of the fifteenth century Part One The historical, social and economic setting, UNESCO Publishing
- Barfield, Thomas (1989), The Perilous Frontier: Nomadic Empires and China, Basil Blackwell
- Baumer, Christoph (2012), The History of Central Asia: The Age of the Steppe Warriors
- Benson, Linda (1998), China's last Nomads: the history and culture of China's Kazaks, M.E. Sharpe
- Bregel, Yuri (2003), An Historical Atlas of Central Asia, Brill
- Bosworth, Clifford Edmund (2000), The Age of Achievement: A.D. 750 to the End of the Fifteenth Century - Vol. 4, Part II : The Achievements (History of Civilizations of Central Asia), UNESCO Publishing
- Bughra, Imin (1983), The history of East Turkestan, Istanbul: Istanbul publications
- Drompp, Michael Robert (2005), Tang China And The Collapse Of The Uighur Empire: A Documentary History, Brill
- Golden, Peter B. (2011), Central Asia in World History, Oxford University Press
- Haywood, John (1998), Historical Atlas of the Medieval World, AD 600-1492, Barnes & Noble
- Latourette, Kenneth Scott (1964), The Chinese, their history and culture, vol. 1–2, Macmillan
- Li, Tang (2005), A History of Uighur Religious Conversions (5th - 16th Centuries), Asia Research Institute
- Mackerras, Colin (1972). The Uighur Empire: According to the T'ang Dynastic Histories, A Study in Sino-Uighur Relations, 744–840. Australian National University Press. ISBN 0-7081-0457-6.
- Mackerras, Colin (1990). "Chapter 12 - The Uighurs". In Sinor, Denis (ed.). The Cambridge History of Early Inner Asia. Cambridge University Press. pp. 317–342. ISBN 0-521-24304-1.
- Millward, James A. (2007), Eurasian Crossroads: A History of Xinjiang, Columbia University Press
- Rong, Xinjiang (2013), Eighteen Lectures on Dunhuang, Brill
- Russell-Smith, Lilla (2005), Uygur Patronage in Dunhuang
- Sinor, Denis (1990), The Cambridge History of Early Inner Asia, Cambridge University Press, ISBN 978-0-521-24304-9
- Soucek, Svat (2000), A History of Inner Asia, Cambridge University Press
- Xiong, Victor (2008), Historical Dictionary of Medieval China, Scarecrow Press, ISBN 978-0810860537
- Xue, Zongzheng (1992), Turkic peoples, 中国社会科学出版社
