= Dingnan Jiedushi =

Chinese state

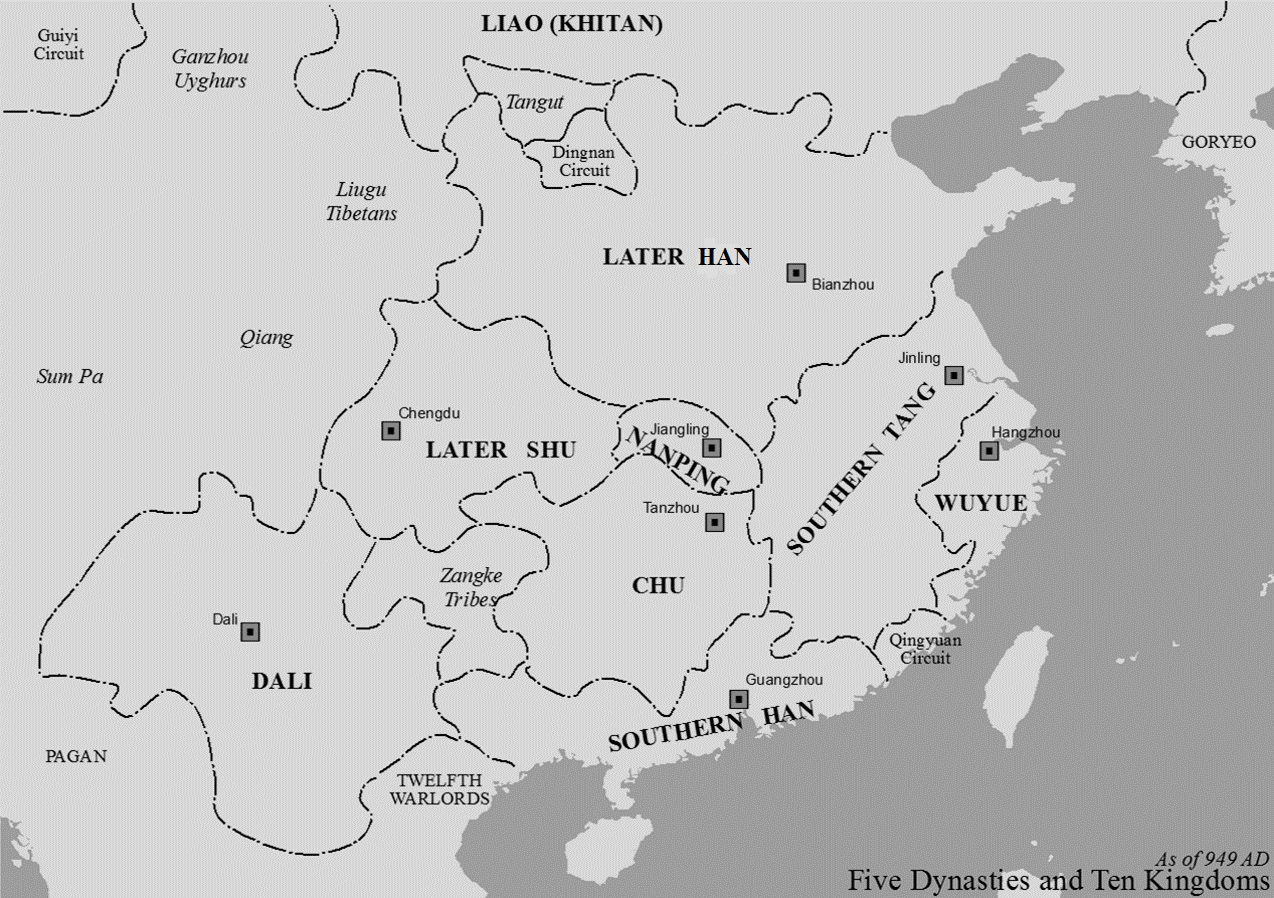
Map showing the location of Dingnan Jiedushi during the Five Dynasties period

Dingnan Jiedushi (simplified Chinese: 定难节度使; traditional Chinese: 定難節度使), also known as Xiasui Jiedushi (simplified Chinese: 夏绥节度使; traditional Chinese: 夏綏節度使), was a jiedushi created in 787 by the Tang dynasty that lasted until the early Northern Song dynasty, when its ruler Li Yuanhao proclaimed himself emperor and established the Western Xia dynasty. Its seat was in modern Yulin, Shaanxi. Its rulers were of Tangut ethnicity starting from Li Sigong (Tuoba Sigong), and they effectively ruled the circuit in de facto independence despite its nominal submission to the central Chinese dynasties. Attempts by the Later Tang and Song dynasty to dislodge the family from its rule of Dingnan Jiedushi were unsuccessful, and the region eventually became the independent dynasty of Western Xia.

== Pre-de facto independent Dingnan Jiedushi ==
- Han Tan (韓潭) (787-798)
- Han Quanyi (韓全義) (798–805)
- Yang Huilin (楊惠琳) (805–806)
- Li Yuan (李願) (806–811)
- Zhang Xu (張煦) (811–813)
- Tian Jin (田縉) (813–819)
- Li Ting (李聽) (819–820)
- Li You (李祐) (820–824)
- Fu Liangbi (傅良弼) (824–828)
- Li Huan (李寰) (828–830)
- Dong Zhongzhi (董重質) (830–832)
- Li Changyan (李昌言) (832–836)
- Liu Yuan (劉源) (836–838)
- Li E (李愕) (844)
- Mi Ji (米暨) (844–846)
- Li Ye (李業) (847–849)
- Cui Mou (崔某) (849–851)
- Li Fu (李福) (851–854)
- Zheng Zhu (鄭助) (854–857)
- Tian Zaibin (田在賓) (857–862)
- Li Yanyuan (李宴元) (865–869)
- Hu Mou (胡某) (869–874)
- Li Xuanli (李玄禮) (874–879)
- Zhuge Shuang (諸葛爽) (880–881)

== Rulers of Dingnan Circuit until Western Xia's founding ==
- Li Sigong (~881–~886)
- Li Sijian (~886–908)
- Li Yichang (908–909/910)
- Li Renfu (909/910–933)
- Li Yichao (933–935)
- Li Yixing (935–967)
- Li Kerui (967–978)
- Li Jiyun (978–980)
- Li Jipeng (also known as Zhao Baozhong) (980–982, 988–994)
- Li Jiqian (also known as Zhao Baoji) (998–1004)
- Li Deming (1004–1031)
- Li Yuanhao (1031–1038, declaration of independent Western Xia state)
