= Tangut people =

Medieval Tibeto-Burman ethnic group

𗼎𗾧
- Tangut officials

Regions with significant populations
- Western Xia

Languages
- Tangut

Religion
- Buddhism, Shamanism, Animism

The Tangut people (Tangut: 𗼎𗾧, mjɨ nja̱ or 𗼇𘓐, mji dzjwo; Chinese: 党項; pinyin: Dǎngxiàng; Tibetan: མི་ཉག་, Wylie: mi nyak; Old Turkic: 𐱃𐰭𐰆𐱃, romanized: Taŋut; Mongolian: Тангуд) were a Sino-Tibetan people who founded and inhabited the Western Xia dynasty. The group initially lived under Tuyuhun authority, but later submitted to the Tang dynasty. After the collapse of Tang dynasty, the Tanguts established the Western Xia. They spoke the Tangut language, which initial research believed to be either of the Qiangic or Yi groups of the Tibeto-Burman family, later phylogenetic and historical linguistic accounts revealed that it belonged to the Gyalrongic branch of the Qiangic group. The Western Xia was annihilated by the Mongol Empire in 1227 AD, and most of its written records and architecture were destroyed. Today the Tangut language and its unique script are extinct; only fragments of Tangut literature remain.

== Language ==
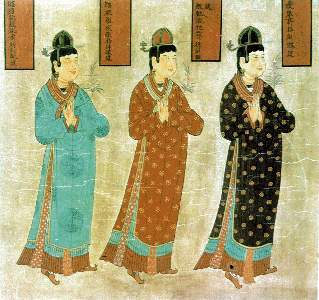
Tangut women

The Tangut language, otherwise known as Fan, belongs to the Tibeto-Burman branch of the Sino-Tibetan language family. Like many other Sino-Tibetan languages, it is a tonal language with predominantly mono-syllabic roots, but it shares certain grammatical traits central to the Tibeto-Burman branch. It used to be debated as to whether Tangut belonged to the Yi or Qiangic subdivision of Tibeto-Burman. The Tanguts, called the Dangqiang (党項; Dǎngxiàng) in Chinese, are typically regarded by Chinese scholars to be synonymous with or at least related to the Qiang people. Historically, "Qiang" was a collective term for the multiple ethnic groups who lived on the western borderlands of China, including the modern Qiang people (Rma). The name Tangut first appears in the Orkhon inscriptions of 735. In their own Tangut language, the Tanguts called themselves Mi-niah (Miñak). Until the 19th century, the term Minjak was still used to refer to the area inhabited by Qiang people in today's Ngawa Tibetan and Qiang Autonomous Prefecture. Speakers of the Qiangic Muya language in western Kangding calls themselves Minyak. Geographic names such as Min river and Min county (Gansu) are pointed to this root.

== Appearance ==
According to William of Rubruck, who travelled to various parts of the Mongol Empire in the 13th century, the Tanguts were valiant and had big swarthy men among them, in contrast to the Uyghurs, who were "of medium size, like us".

The Tangut people I saw were tall but swarthy. The Iugurs are of medium build like our own people.

— William of Rubruck

== Origin ==
The early Tanguts inhabited the steppes and mountains of southeast Qinghai and northwest Sichuan. Their home originally was in the highlands of western Sichuan. These regions correspond to the Amdo and Kham regions of the Tibetan plateau. At some point their leader Tuoba Chici, who was likely of mixed Xianbei and Qiang heritage, submitted to Tang China rule and was bestowed the title of Captain General of Western-Rong and the surname "Li". In the early 8th century, increasing pressure from the Tibetan Empire had forced the Tanguts to migrate north from their homelands in northeastern Tibet to the eastern Ordos region. By the time of the An Lushan Rebellion (755–763), the Tanguts were the predominant local power in what is now eastern Gansu, Ningxia, and northern Shaanxi.

== History ==
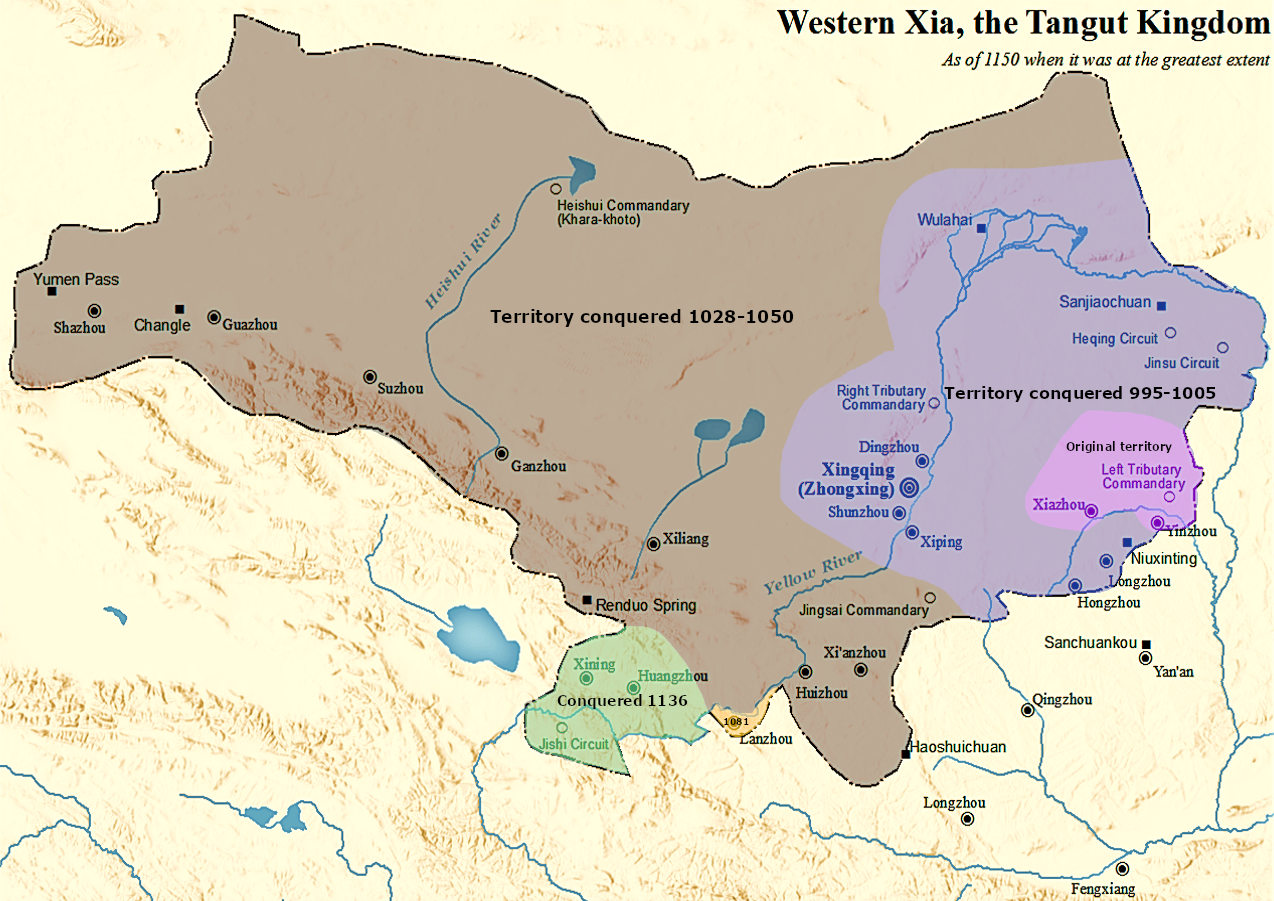
Expansion of the Western Xia dynasty

In 881 the Tanguts, who were subjects of Tang China, assisted Tang in suppressing the Huang Chao rebellion. As a reward the Tang central government granted the Tangut general Li Sigong the three prefectures of Xia (Chinese: 夏州, Tangut: 𘒂𗉔), Sui (Chinese: 綏州, Tangut: 𗉢𗉔), and Yin (Chinese: 銀州, Tangut: 𘝰𗉔) as hereditary titles under the Dingnan Jiedushi. After the collapse of Tang China, multiple warlords started to form new states in the former territories of Tang China. The Tanguts expanded their realm southwest towards their old homelands. In 1002 they conquered Ling Prefecture and set up their first capital there under the name of Xiping. By 1036 they had annexed the Guiyi Circuit and the Ganzhou Uyghur Kingdom, even pushing into Tibetan territory and conquering Xining. The state of Western Xia was proclaimed in 1038.

Being subjects of Tang China previously for two centuries, the Tangut people adopted many Han/Tang Chinese culture, but also maintained their own customs, as is proven by the vast amount of literature which survived the Tangut state itself.

The Western Xia founder Li Deming's son, Li Yuanhao, enthroned as Emperor Jingzong, sought to differentiate the Tangut state from that of its rival Han-led Song China and started to nurture a national Tangut identity by ordering the creation of an official Tangut script and by instituting laws that reinforced traditional Tangut customs. One of the laws he mandated called for citizens to wear traditional ethnic apparel and another required men to wear their hair short or shaved as opposed to the Chinese custom of wearing hair long and knotted. Abandoning the royal Chinese surnames of "Li", previously bestowed by the Tang dynasty Li royal family, and "Zhao", subsequently bestowed by the Song dynasty Zhao royal family, he adopted a Tangut surname 𗼨𗆟, rendered in Chinese as "Weiming" (Chinese: 嵬名). He made Xingqing (Chinese: 興慶, modern Yinchuan) his capital city.

In the thirteenth century, Genghis Khan unified the northern grasslands of Mongolia and led his troops in six rounds of attacks against the Western Xia over a period of twenty-two years (1205, 1207, 1209–10, 1211–13, 1214–19, 1225–27). During the last spate of the Mongol attacks, Genghis died in Western Xia territory. The official Mongol history attributes his death to illness, whereas legends claim that he died from a wound inflicted in these battles.

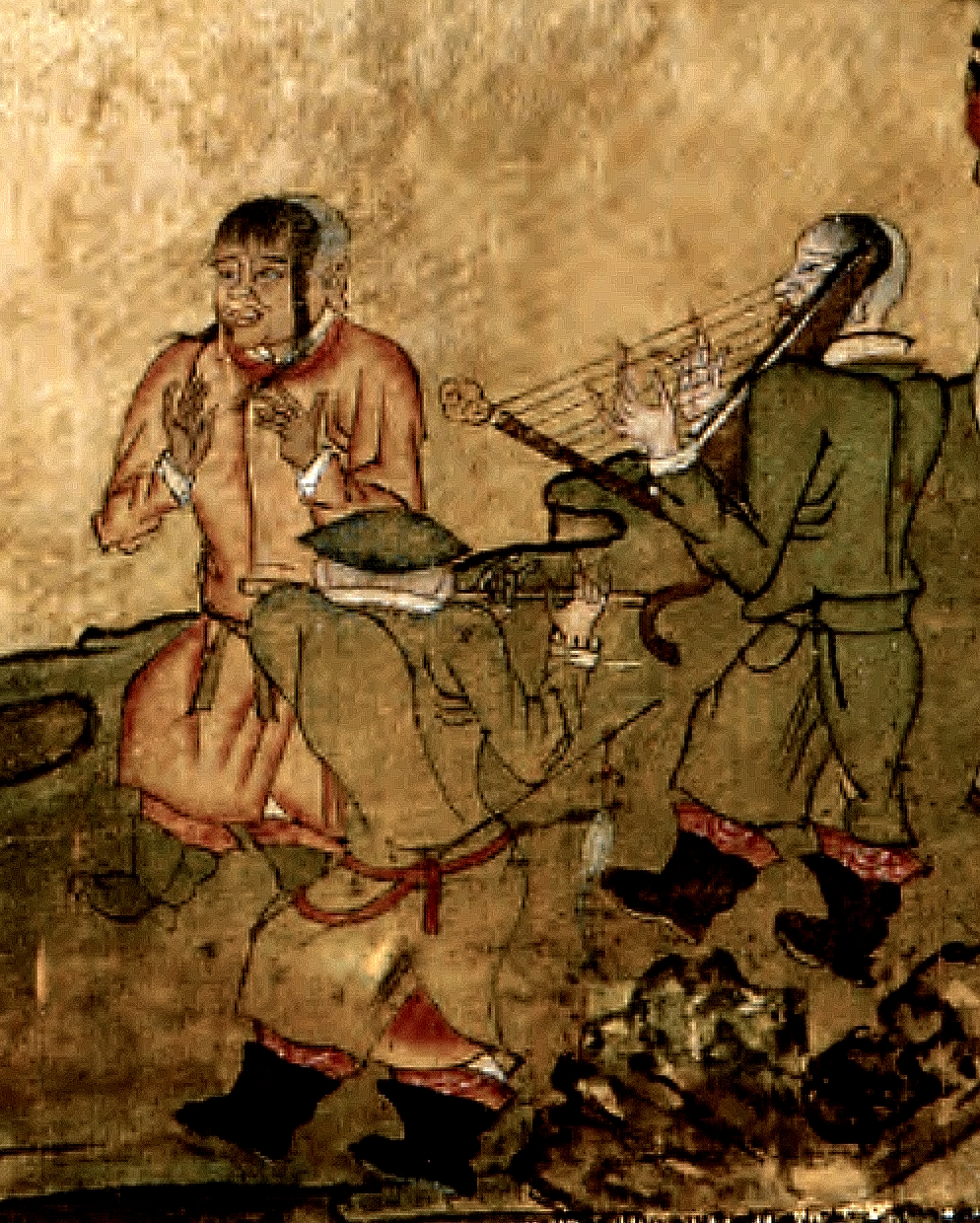
Moon-Water Bodhisattva Kuanyin, detail of entertainers (detail). China, Tangut State of Xi-Xia, Khara Khoto. 10-13th century. State Hermitage Museum

In 1227, the capital of Western Xia was overrun by the Mongols, who devastated its buildings and written records: all was burnt to the ground except its monastery. The last emperor was killed and tens of thousands of civilians massacred. However, many Tangut families joined the Mongol Empire. Some of them led Mongol armies, e.g. Cha'an, into the conquest of China. After the Yuan dynasty (1271–1368) was established, the Tangut troops were incorporated into the Mongol army in their subsequent military conquests in central and southern China. The Tangut were considered Semu under the Yuan class system, thus separating them from the North Chinese. As late as the Ming dynasty (1368–1644), there was evidence of small Tangut communities in Anhui and Henan provinces. The people including members of the royal clan emigrated to western Sichuan, northern Tibet, even possibly northeast India, in some instances becoming local rulers. The Tangut people living in Central China preserved their language until at least the 16th century.

== Culture ==
Tangut society was divided into two classes: the "Red Faced" and the "Black Headed". The Red Faced Tanguts were seen as commoners while the Black Headed Tanguts made up the elite priestly caste. Although Buddhism was extremely popular among the Tangut people, many Tangut herdsmen continued to practice a kind of shamanism known as Root West (Melie). The black caps worn by Root West shamans give the Black Headed caste its name. According to Tangut myth, the ancestor of the Black Headed Tanguts was a heavenly white crane, while the ancestor of the Red Faced Tanguts was a monkey. Tangut kings went by the title of Wuzu.

According to sources in the Tangut language, the Tangut state known now as the Western Xia was named 𗴂𗹭𗂧𘜶 translated as "Great State of White and Lofty" (phôn¹ mbın² lhi̯ə tha²). Although the Chinese translation of this name (Chinese: 白高大國; pinyin: Báigāo Dàguó) was occasionally used in Tangut sources, the state was most commonly referred to as the "Great Xia" (大夏) in Chinese-language sources of the Tangut or as the "Xia State" (Chinese: 夏國) to the Song. In later historiography and in modern Chinese the Tangut state is referred to as the "Western Xia" (Xī Xià 西夏). The Mongols and other steppe tribes referred to the Tangut kingdom as "Qashi" or "Qashin", which was derived from the Middle Chinese name for Hexi, the region the Tanguts controlled (Chinese: 河西).

== Religion ==
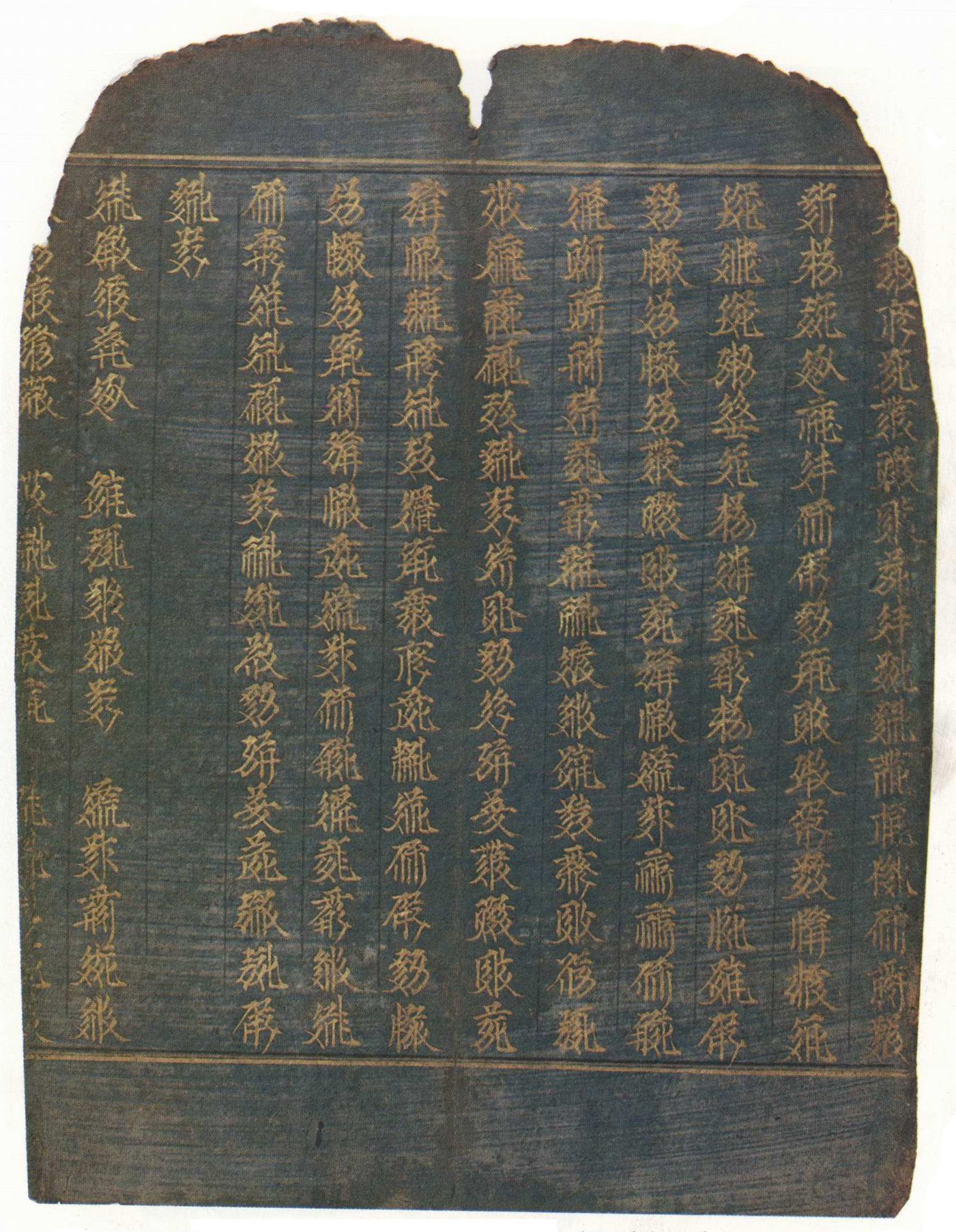
The Golden Light Sutra written in the Tangut script

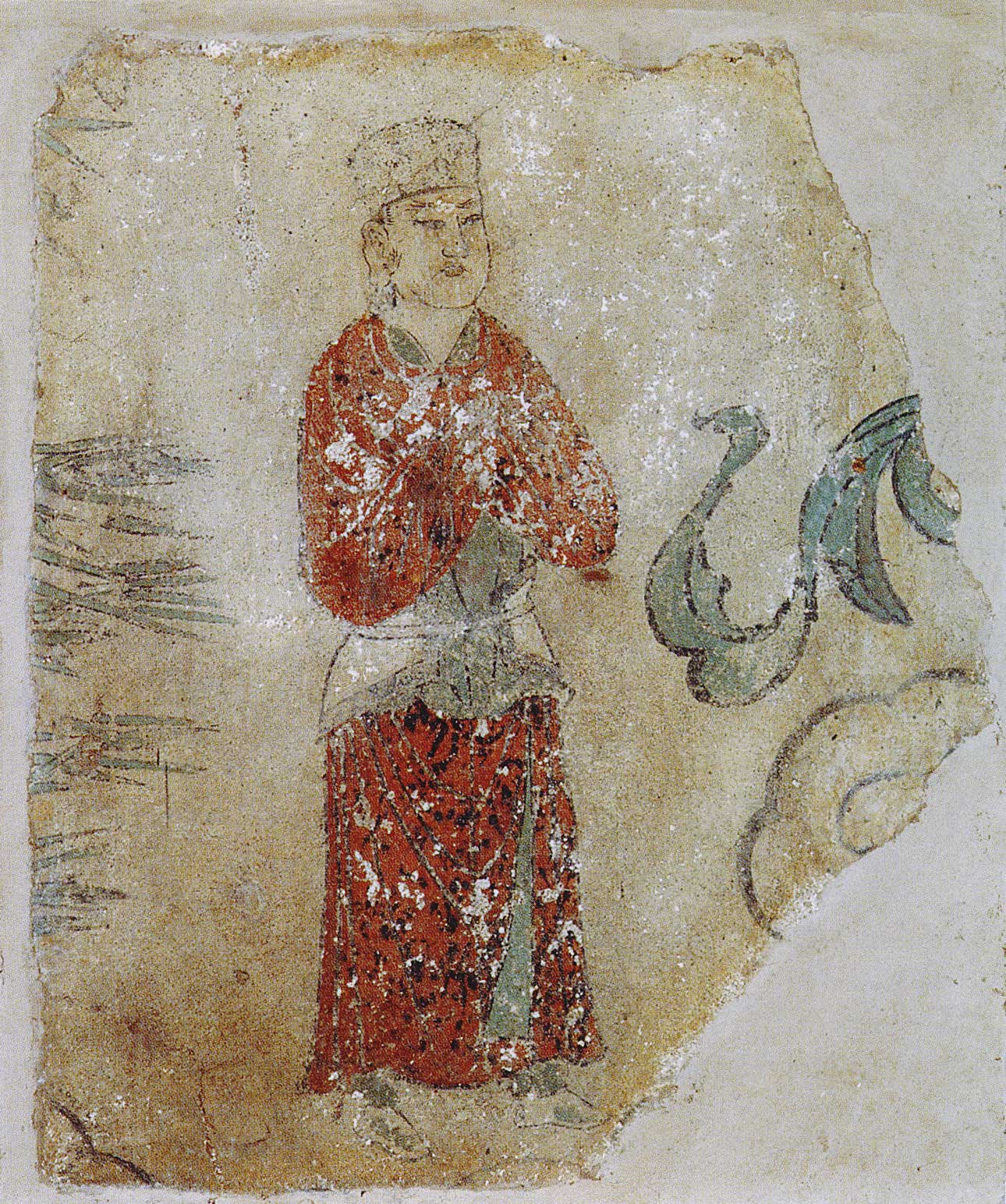
Praying Tangut man

The Tanguts were primarily Buddhists. Tangut Buddhism was influenced by external elements. The entire Chinese Buddhist canon was translated into the Tangut language over a span of 50 years and published around 1090 in about 3700 fascicles. Buddhism in the Tangut state is believed to be an amalgamation of Tibetan and Chinese traditions, among which the Huayan-Chan tradition of Guifeng Zongmi (Chinese: 圭峰宗密, 780–841) and his master Huayan Chengguan was the most influential. A number of texts previously believed to be of native Tangut origin turned out to be translations of Khitan source texts. The degree of Tibetan impact on the formation of Tangut Buddhism still remains unexplored, especially in the light of new discoveries showing that Tangut Buddhism owed more to the local culture in North China than to pure Tibetan or Chinese influences. Texts belonging to the Tibetan Mahamudra tradition demonstrate that Tangut Buddhism initially evolved along the Karma Kagyu rather than Sakya lines of Buddhist transmission.

A number of Tangut Buddhist institutions, such as "Imperial Preceptor" survived the Tangut State itself and could be found during the Yuan dynasty. One of the more definite sources of Tangut Buddhism was Mount Wutai, where both Huayan and Chinese Esoteric Buddhism flourished from the late Tang dynasty up to the time of the Mongol conquest.

Solonin (2005: unpaginated) links the Tanguts, the Helan Mountains and the Chan teachings of both Kim Hwasang and Baotang Wuzhu:

The origins of the Tangut Chan can also be traced deeper than previously believed: information on Bao-tang Wu-zhu (保唐无住720～794) travels in North-Western China from the Notes on Transmitting the Dharma Treasure through Generations implies that at the period of 760's some sort of Buddhism was spread in the region of Helanshan, where the Tangut were already residing. Concerning the late 8th century Helanshan Buddhism, little can be said: the doctrines of the lu (律) school and the teaching of Sichuan Chan of Rev. Kim (金和尚) seem to be known there.

Worship of Confucianism also existed in the Western Xia, which has led to some claims that the Tangut religion was rooted in Confucianism, but this was incomparable with the degree of popularity of Buddhism. Tangut literature is dominated by Buddhist scriptures while secular teachings including the Chinese classics were rarely available in the Tangut language.

The Tangut state enforced strict laws pertaining to the teaching of religious beliefs and rigorously screened potential teachers. Before he was allowed to teach, a newcomer entering the state from Tibet or India first had to seek the approval of local authorities. Doctrines taught and methods used were carefully supervised to ensure there was no possibility that the Tangut people might misunderstand the teachings. Anyone found to be a fortune-teller or charlatan faced immediate persecution. Deeming it contrary to Buddhist ethical beliefs, the Tangut state strictly forbade religious teachers from accepting compensation or reward for their teaching services.

Although the state did not support an official school of Buddhism, it did protect all religious sites and objects within the country's boundaries.

As in China, becoming a Buddhist monk required government approval and anyone found to have taken the vows of a monk without such government oversight faced severe punishment. Remarkably for the time, women played a role in Tangut religious practices by serving as nuns, a position that could only be held by a woman who had been widowed or who was an unmarried virgin.

Suchan (1998) traces the influence of the first several Karmapas upon the Yuan and Ming courts as well as the Western Xia, and mentions Düsum Khyenpa, 1st Karmapa Lama:

The first several Karmapas are distinguished by their important status at the Yuan and Ming courts of China where they served as the spiritual guides to princes and emperors. Their influence also extended to the court of the Tangut Xia Kingdom where a disciple of Dusum Khyenpa was given the title "Supreme Teacher" by a Tangut Xixia King[.]

After the fall of the Western Xia, the influx of refugees into Tibet led to the adoption of the Pehar deity into Tibetan Buddhism, eventually in the important role as the state oracle, the Nechung Oracle.

== Gallery ==
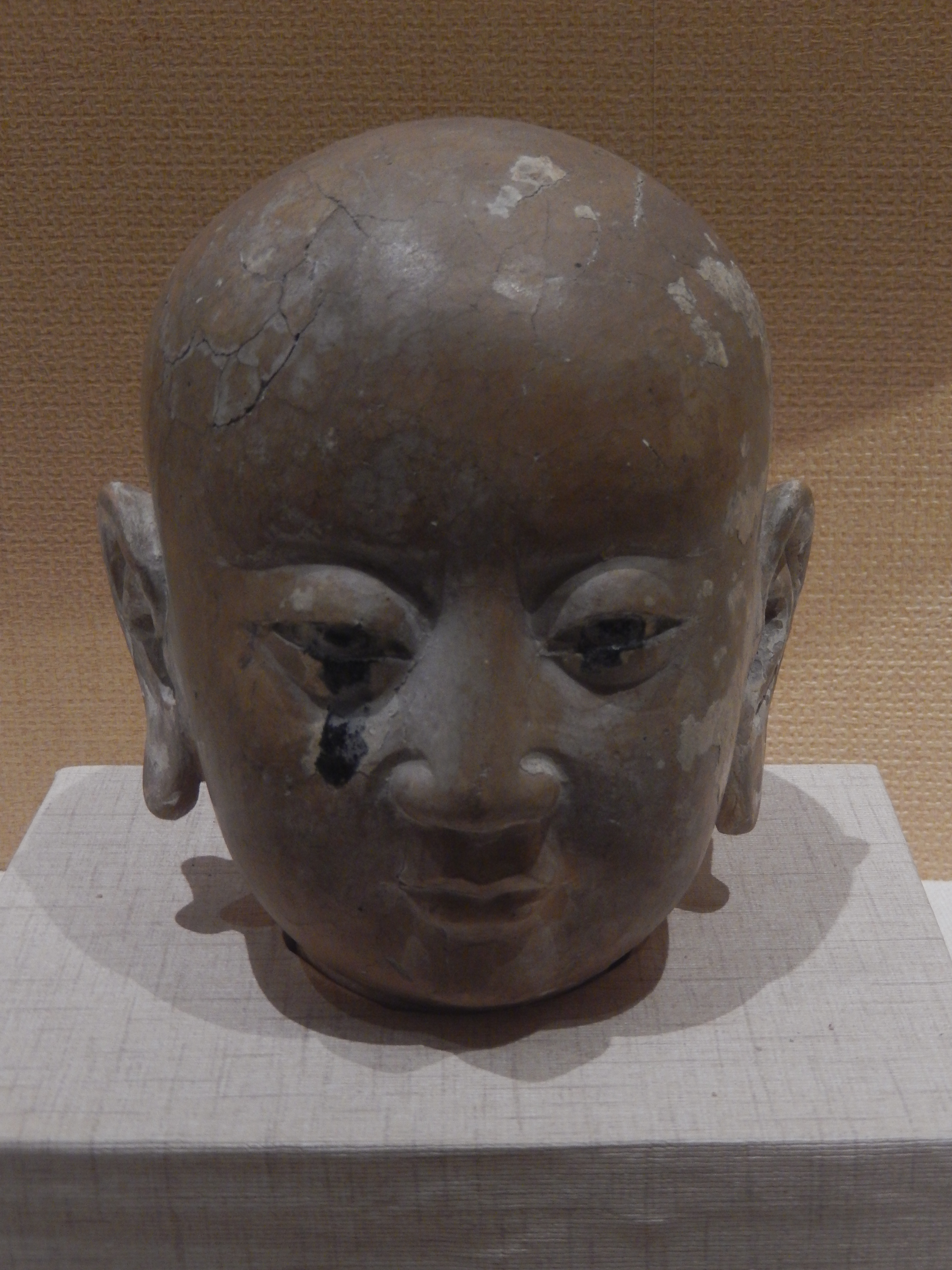
Statue head of a Buddhist arhat, Western Xia dynasty, from Hongfo Pagoda, Helan County, Ningxia

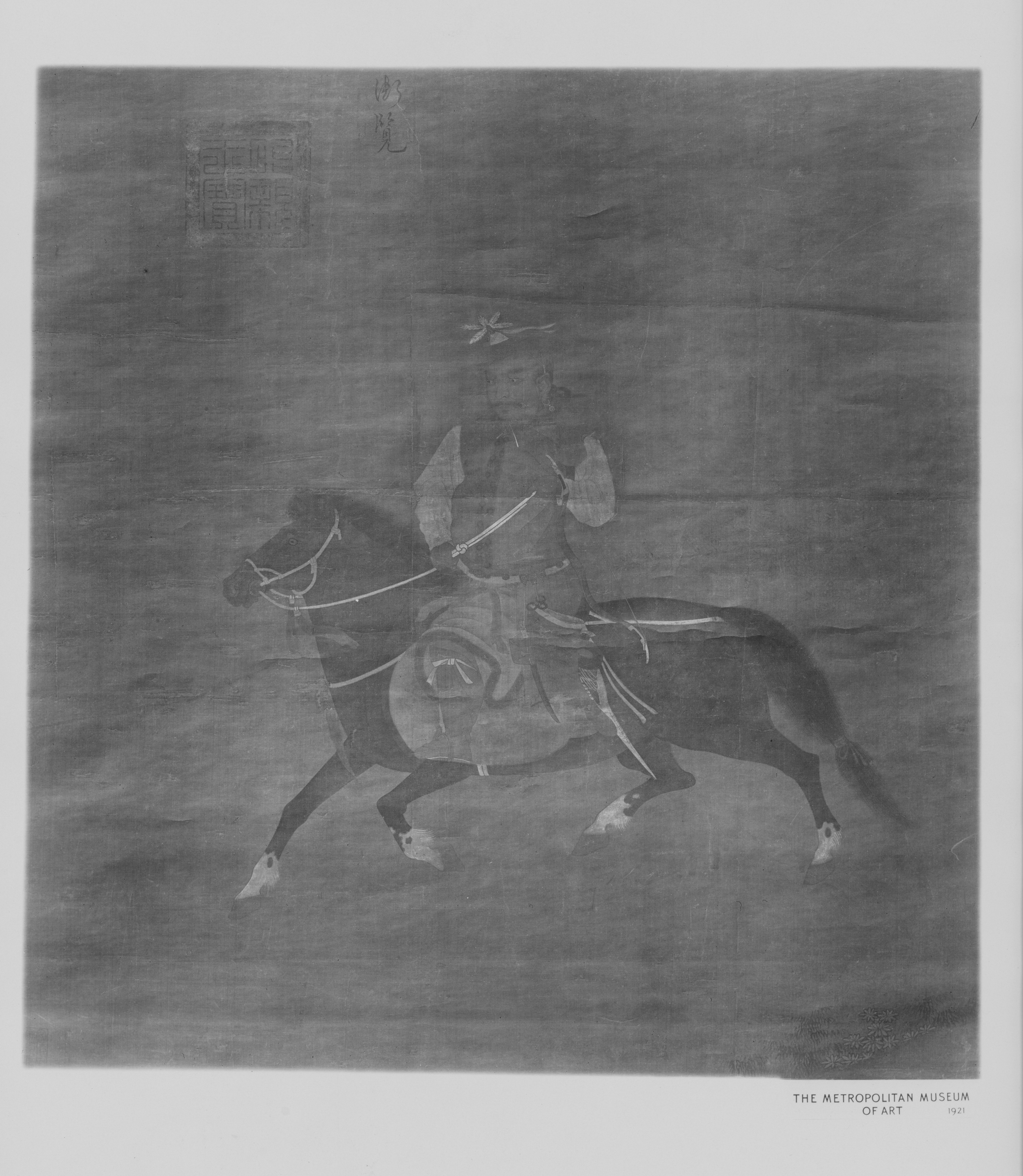
Tangut Horseman

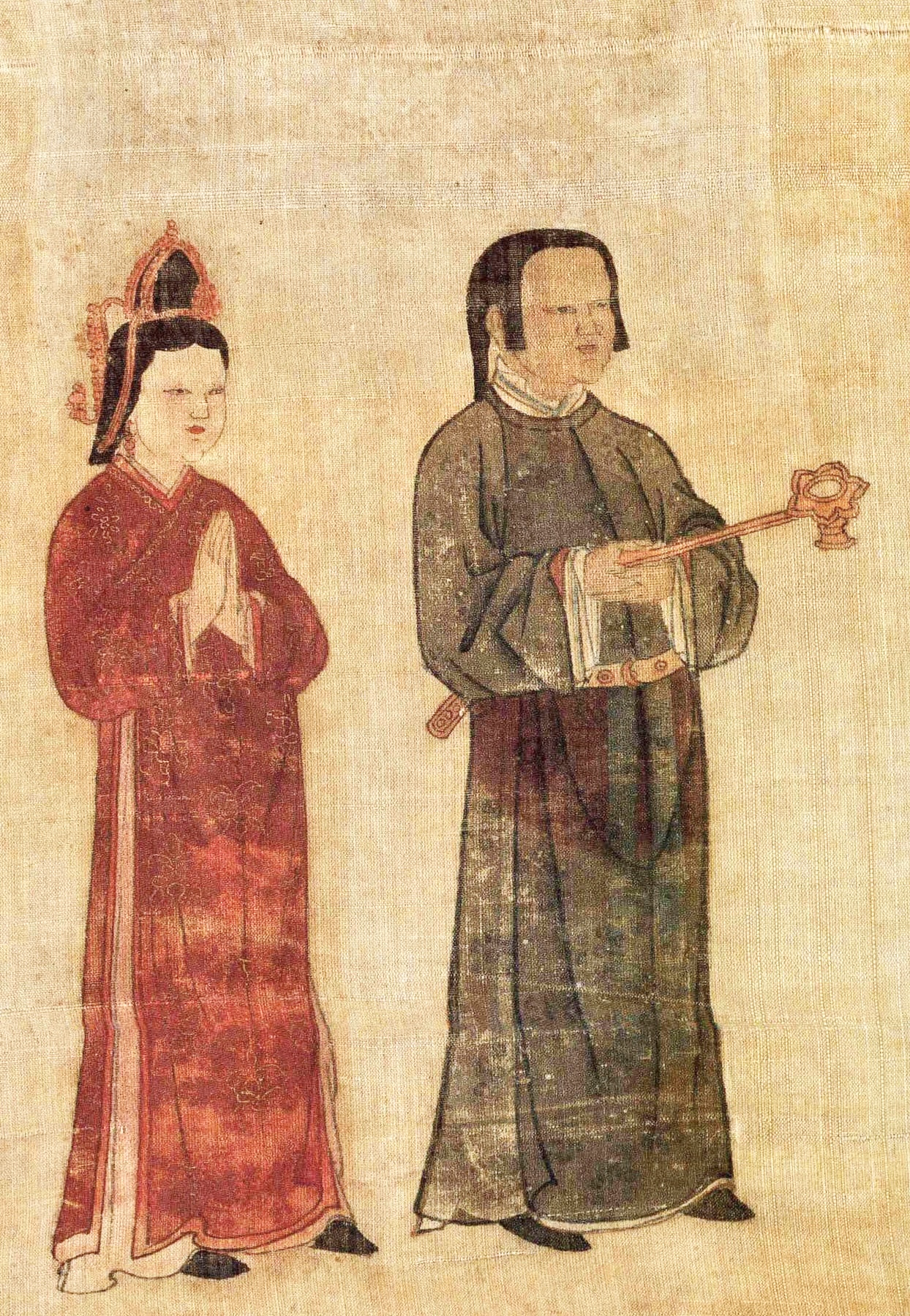
Tangut bride

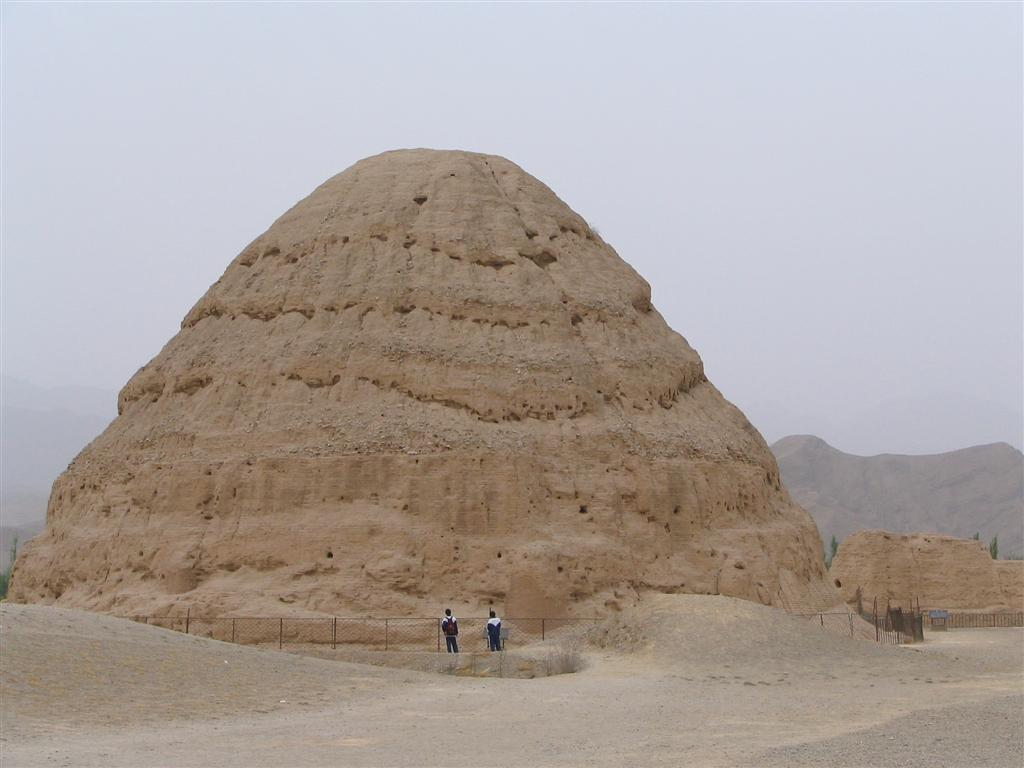
Western Xia tomb mound

== See also ==
- Tangut script
- Tangut language
- List of Tangut books
- Dingnan Jiedushi, de facto independent Tangut kingdom
- Western Xia (also called the Tangut Empire)

== Bibliography ==
- Andrade, Tonio (2016), The Gunpowder Age: China, Military Innovation, and the Rise of the West in World History, Princeton University Press, ISBN 978-0-691-13597-7.
- Asimov, M.S. (1998), History of civilizations of Central Asia Volume IV The age of achievement: A.D. 750 to the end of the fifteenth century Part One The historical, social and economic setting, UNESCO Publishing
- Barfield, Thomas (1989), The Perilous Frontier: Nomadic Empires and China, Basil Blackwell
- Barrett, Timothy Hugh (2008), The Woman Who Discovered Printing, Great Britain: Yale University Press, ISBN 978-0-300-12728-7 (alk. paper)
- Beaudouin, Mathieu (2023). "Tangut and Horpa languages: Some shared morphosyntactic features". Language and Linguistics. 24 (4).
- Beckwith, Christopher I (1987), The Tibetan Empire in Central Asia: A History of the Struggle for Great Power among Tibetans, Turks, Arabs, and Chinese during the Early Middle Ages, Princeton University Press
- Beckwith, Christopher I. (2009), Empires of the Silk Road: A History of Central Eurasia from the Bronze Age to the Present, Princeton University Press, ISBN 978-0-691-13589-2
- Bregel, Yuri (2003), An Historical Atlas of Central Asia, Brill
- Drompp, Michael Robert (2005), Tang China And The Collapse Of The Uighur Empire: A Documentary History, Brill
- Ebrey, Patricia Buckley (1999), The Cambridge Illustrated History of China, Cambridge: Cambridge University Press, ISBN 0-521-66991-X (paperback).
- Ebrey, Patricia Buckley; Walthall, Anne; Palais, James B. (2006), East Asia: A Cultural, Social, and Political History, Boston: Houghton Mifflin, ISBN 0-618-13384-4
- Golden, Peter B. (1992), An Introduction to the History of the Turkic Peoples: Ethnogenesis and State-Formation in Medieval and Early Modern Eurasia and the Middle East, OTTO HARRASSOWITZ · WIESBADEN
- Graff, David A. (2002), Medieval Chinese Warfare, 300-900, Warfare and History, London: Routledge, ISBN 0415239559
- Graff, David Andrew (2016), The Eurasian Way of War Military Practice in Seventh-Century China and Byzantium, Routledge, ISBN 978-0-415-46034-7.
- Haywood, John (1998), Historical Atlas of the Medieval World, AD 600-1492, Barnes & Noble
- Jackson, Peter (1990), The Mission of Friar William of Rubruck
- Lai, Yunfan; Gong, Xun; Gates, Jesse P.; Jacques, Guillaume (2020), "Tangut as a West Gyalrongic language", Folia Linguistica Historica, 41 (1): 171–203, doi:10.1515/flih-2020-0006, S2CID 229165606
- Latourette, Kenneth Scott (1964), The Chinese, their history and culture, Volumes 1-2, Macmillan
- Lorge, Peter A. (2008), The Asian Military Revolution: from Gunpowder to the Bomb, Cambridge University Press, ISBN 978-0-521-60954-8
- Millward, James (2009), Eurasian Crossroads: A History of Xinjiang, Columbia University Press
- Needham, Joseph (1986), Science & Civilisation in China, vol. V:7: The Gunpowder Epic, Cambridge University Press, ISBN 0-521-30358-3
- Rong, Xinjiang (2013), Eighteen Lectures on Dunhuang, Brill
- Shaban, M. A. (1979), The ʿAbbāsid Revolution, Cambridge: Cambridge University Press, ISBN 0-521-29534-3
- Rockhill, William Woodville (1967), The Journey of William of Rubruck to The Eastern Parts of the World, 1253-55, As Narrated by Himself, With Two Accounts of the Earlier Journey of John of Pian de Carpine.
- Sagart, Laurent; Jacques, Guillaume; Lai, Yunfan; Ryder, Robin; Thouzeau, Valentin; Greenhill, Simon J.; List, Johann-Mattis (2019), "Dated language phylogenies shed light on the history of Sino-Tibetan", Proceedings of the National Academy of Sciences of the United States of America, 116 (21): 10317–10322, doi:10.1073/pnas.1817972116, PMC 6534992, PMID 31061123.
- Sima, Guang (2015), Bóyángbǎn Zīzhìtōngjiàn 54 huánghòu shīzōng 柏楊版資治通鑑54皇后失蹤, Yuǎnliú chūbǎnshìyè gǔfèn yǒuxiàn gōngsī, ISBN 978-957-32-0876-1
- Skaff, Jonathan Karam (2012), Sui-Tang China and Its Turko-Mongol Neighbors: Culture, Power, and Connections, 580-800 (Oxford Studies in Early Empires), Oxford University Press
- Vovin, Alexander (2020), Tangut Language and Manuscripts
- Wang, Zhenping (2013), Tang China in Multi-Polar Asia: A History of Diplomacy and War, University of Hawaii Press
- Wilkinson, Endymion (2015). Chinese History: A New Manual, 4th edition. Cambridge, MA: Harvard University Asia Center distributed by Harvard University Press. ISBN 9780674088467.
- Yuan, Shu (2001), Bóyángbǎn Tōngjiàn jìshìběnmò 28 dìèrcìhuànguánshídài 柏楊版通鑑記事本末28第二次宦官時代, Yuǎnliú chūbǎnshìyè gǔfèn yǒuxiàn gōngsī, ISBN 957-32-4273-7
- Xiong, Victor Cunrui (2000), Sui-Tang Chang'an: A Study in the Urban History of Late Medieval China (Michigan Monographs in Chinese Studies), U OF M CENTER FOR CHINESE STUDIES, ISBN 0892641371
- Xiong, Victor Cunrui (2009), Historical Dictionary of Medieval China, United States of America: Scarecrow Press, Inc., ISBN 978-0810860537
- Xue, Zongzheng (1992), Turkic peoples, 中国社会科学出版社
