= Fogg Banner of Eleven-Headed Guanyin =

10th-century Chinese silk painting

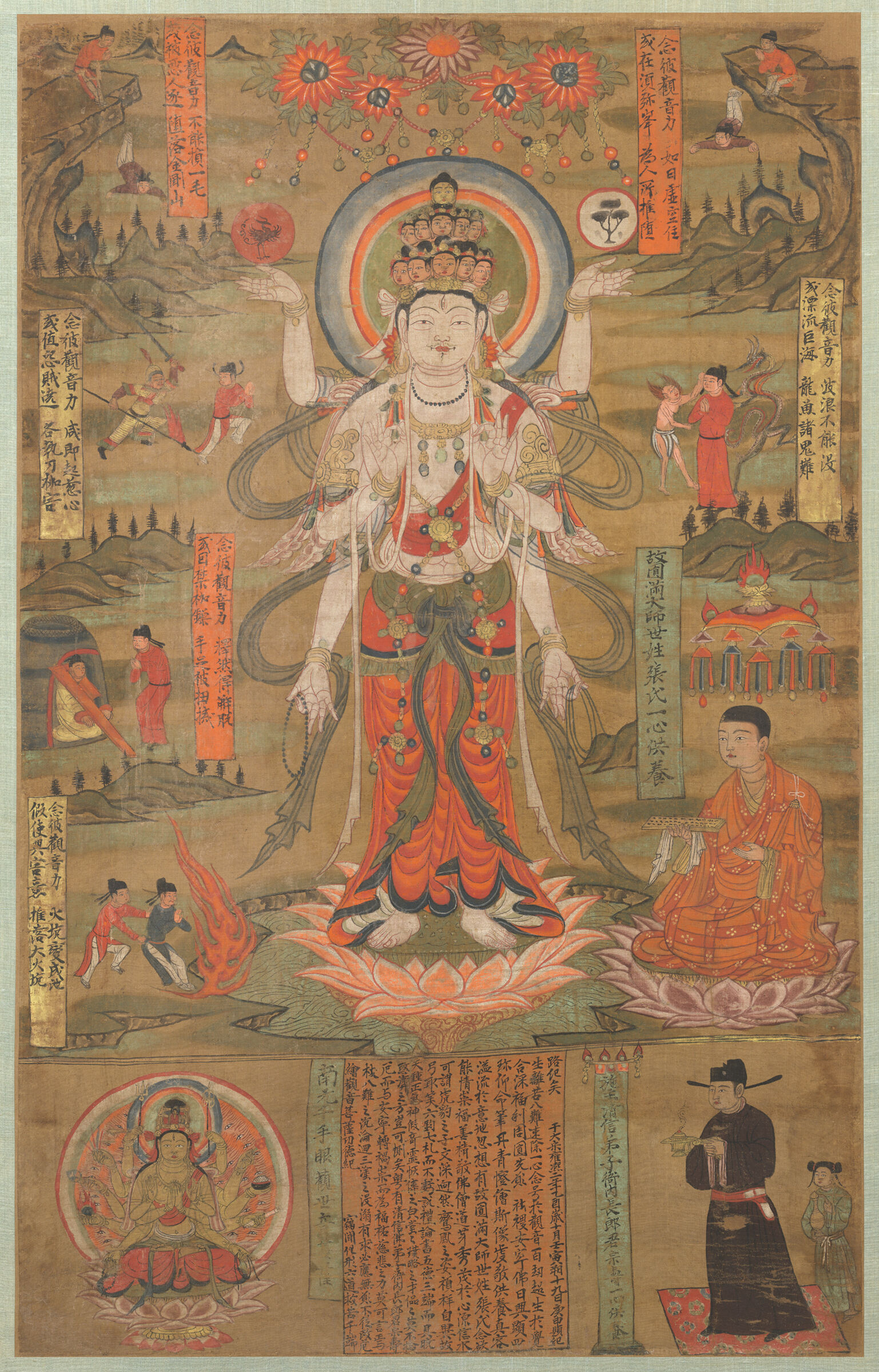
- Type: Banner, Hanging scroll
- Material: Silk
- Height: 96 cm (38 in)
- Width: 62.8 cm (24.7 in)
- Created: Mogao Caves, 985
- Period/culture: Northern Song Dynasty
- Discovered: 1900; Library Cave 17
- Discovered by: Wang Yuanlu
- Place: Harvard Art Museum
- Identification: 1943.57.14
- Language: Chinese
- Culture: Guiyi Circuit
- https://harvardartmuseums.org/collections/object/204072

The Fogg Banner of Eleven-Headed Guanyin is a 10th-century Chinese silk painting, depicting Ekādaśamukha, an Eleven-Headed image of the bodhisattva Guanyin, or Avalokiteśvara.

Discovered in 1900 in the Mogao Caves of Dunhuang from the Library Cave, it is currently owned by the Harvard Art Museums since 1943.

== Provenance ==
In 1900, Wang Yuanlu (王圓籙), the caretaker of the Mogao Caves, discovered Cave 17 , nicknamed the "Library Cave" with its cache of 50,000 manuscripts, paintings, and banners with various artifacts dating in 4th to 11th centuries.

In 1907, Wang sold many of the materials to pay for upkeep and restoration of Dunhuang and the material was divided by Aurel Stein, Paul Pelliot, Sergey Oldenburg, and various other explorers thru, which caused the separation of the Library, of which the Fogg Banner was one of the materials.

Harvard University's holdings of Dunhuang material began in 1924 with the expedition held by Fogg Museum's curator Langdon Warner.

In 1937, collector Grenville Lindall Winthrop acquired the banner from Yamanaka and Co. and upon his passing in 1943, it was acquired by Harvard Art Museums under accession number 1943.57.14.

== Description ==
Thanks to numerous inscriptions on the banner, the context and dating of the banner can be ascertained, down to the year 985, the early end of the Song dynasty, corresponding to that of Emperor Taizong (976-997).

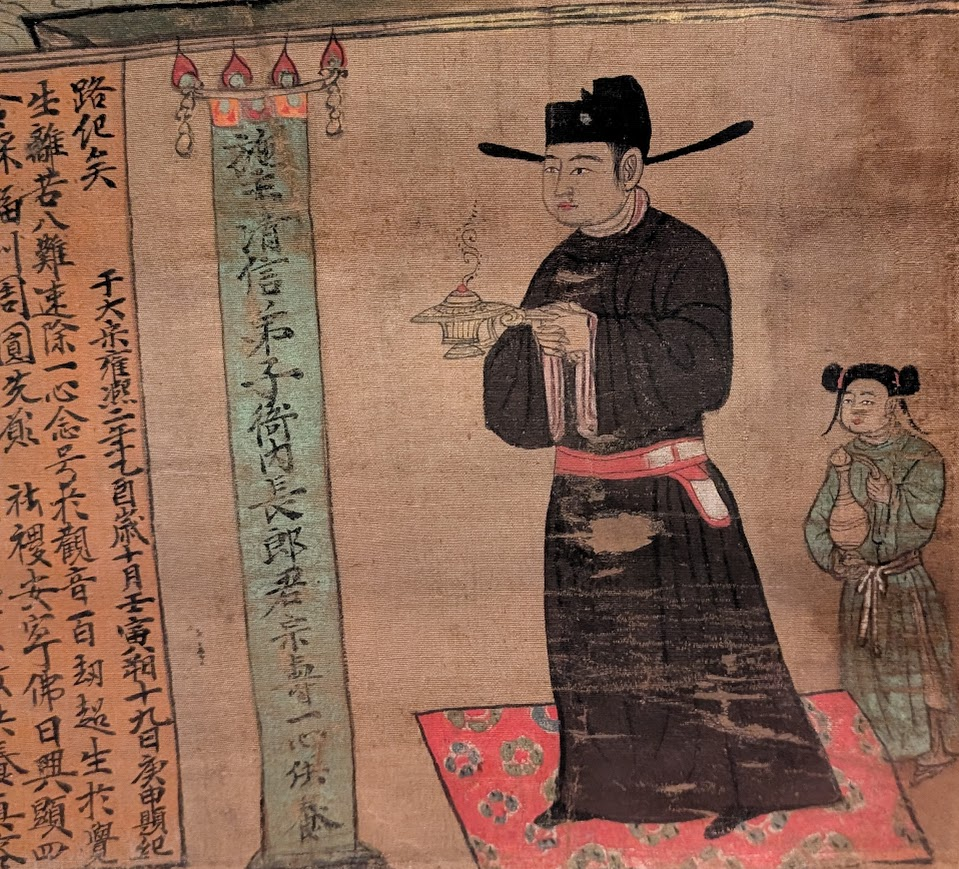
Cao Zongshou - Governor of the Guiyi Circuit

The scroll depicts the Ekādaśamukha manifestation of Guanyin, heavily outlined and painted with vivid colors. The surrounding images depict the Gatha, or prose which shows instances of miracles by the bodhisattva that saves people from dangerous situations. Six of these Dunhuang banners depicting Guanyin are found in Western collections, all dating between the Five Dynasties to the Early Song.

The prominent text on the banner are quotations from Chapter 25 of the Lotus Sutra, which is the earliest and most popular depiction of Guanyin/Avalokiteśvara.

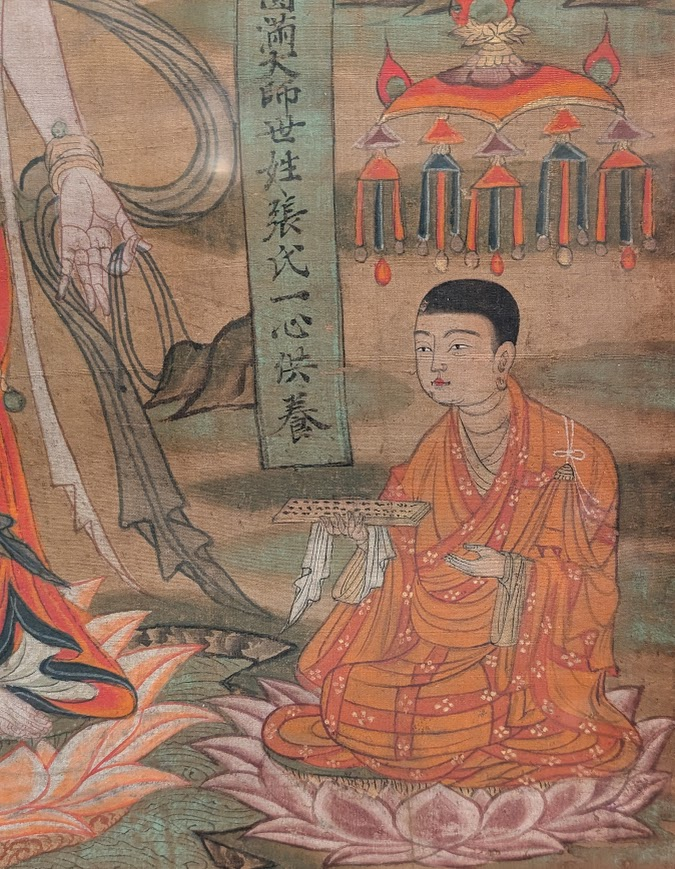
The Monk - Yuanman (圓滿), to which Cao has dedicated the scroll to.

On the bottom depicts the donor and memorial recipient of the banner. The inscription identifies Cao Zongshou (曹宗壽), to Yuanman (圓滿) with a dedicatory inscription of:

The late teacher, Yuanman, whose earthly name was Zhang, dedicated this with his whole heart.

Cao Zongshou is a member of the Guiyi Circuit, the local leader of Dunhuang who made regular donations to Mogao, including a set of sutras years later in 1002, the last set of dated manuscripts known on site.

== See also ==
- Kneeling Attendant Bodhisattva (Mogao Cave) - another artifiact sourced from Mogao Caves as part of the Harvard Art Museums collection
- Miraculous Image of Liangzhou - from the British Museum, sourced from the same cave
