= Zhang Yichao =

Chinese general during the Tang dynasty

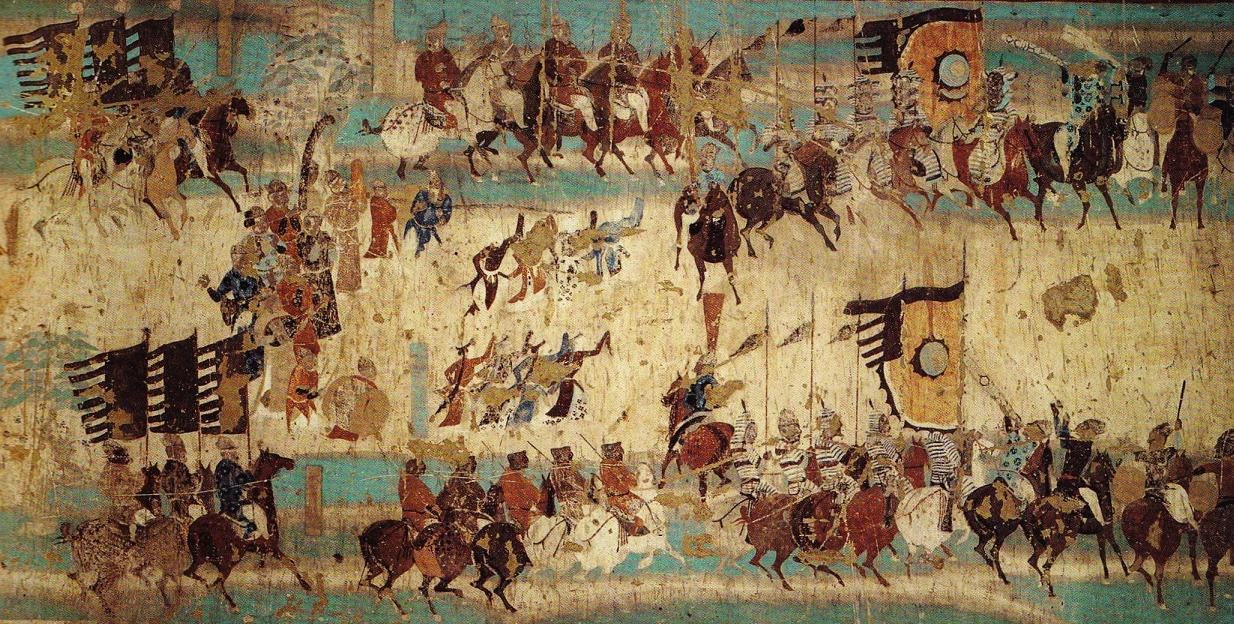
Mural commemorating victory of General Zhang Yichao over the Tibetans in 848. Mogao cave 156, Late Tang dynasty

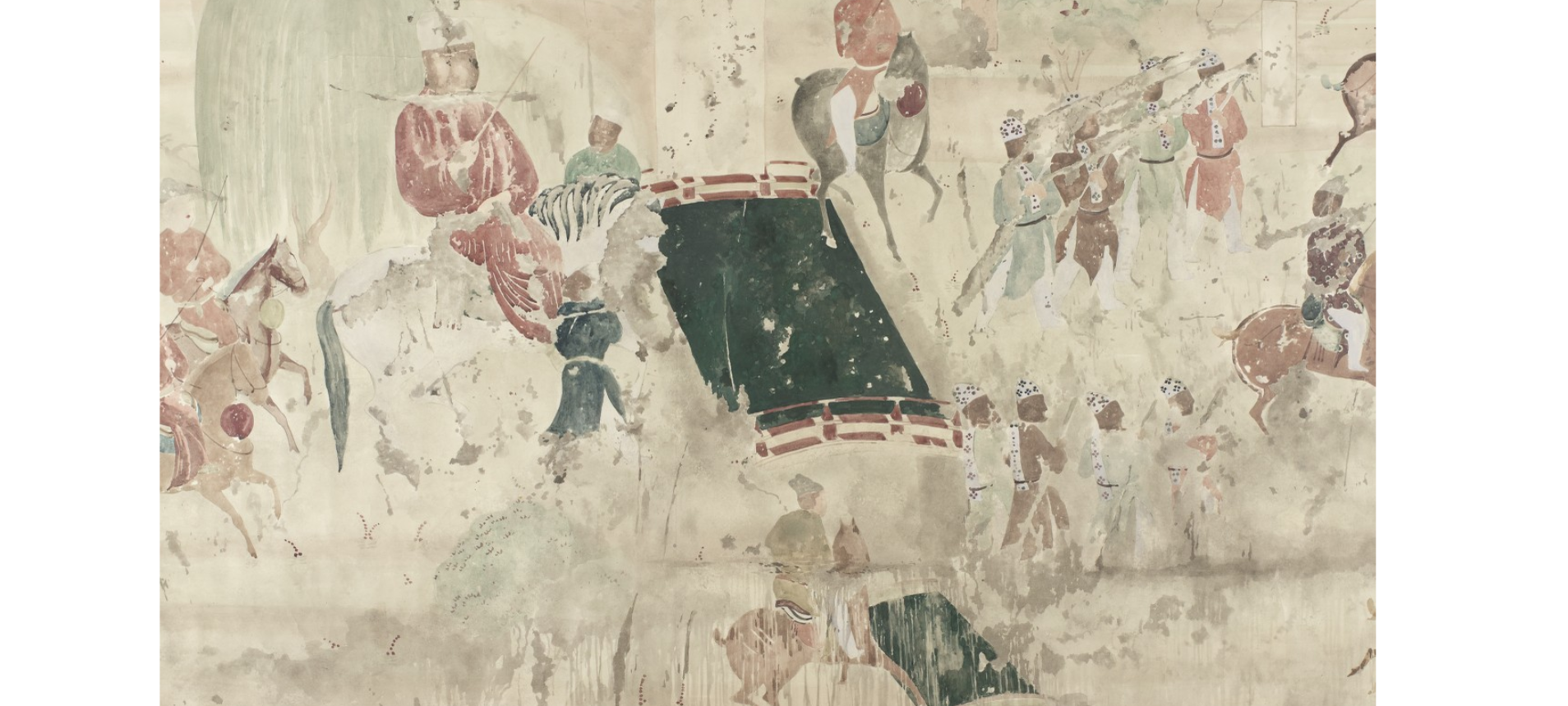
Zhang Yichao leaving on campaign

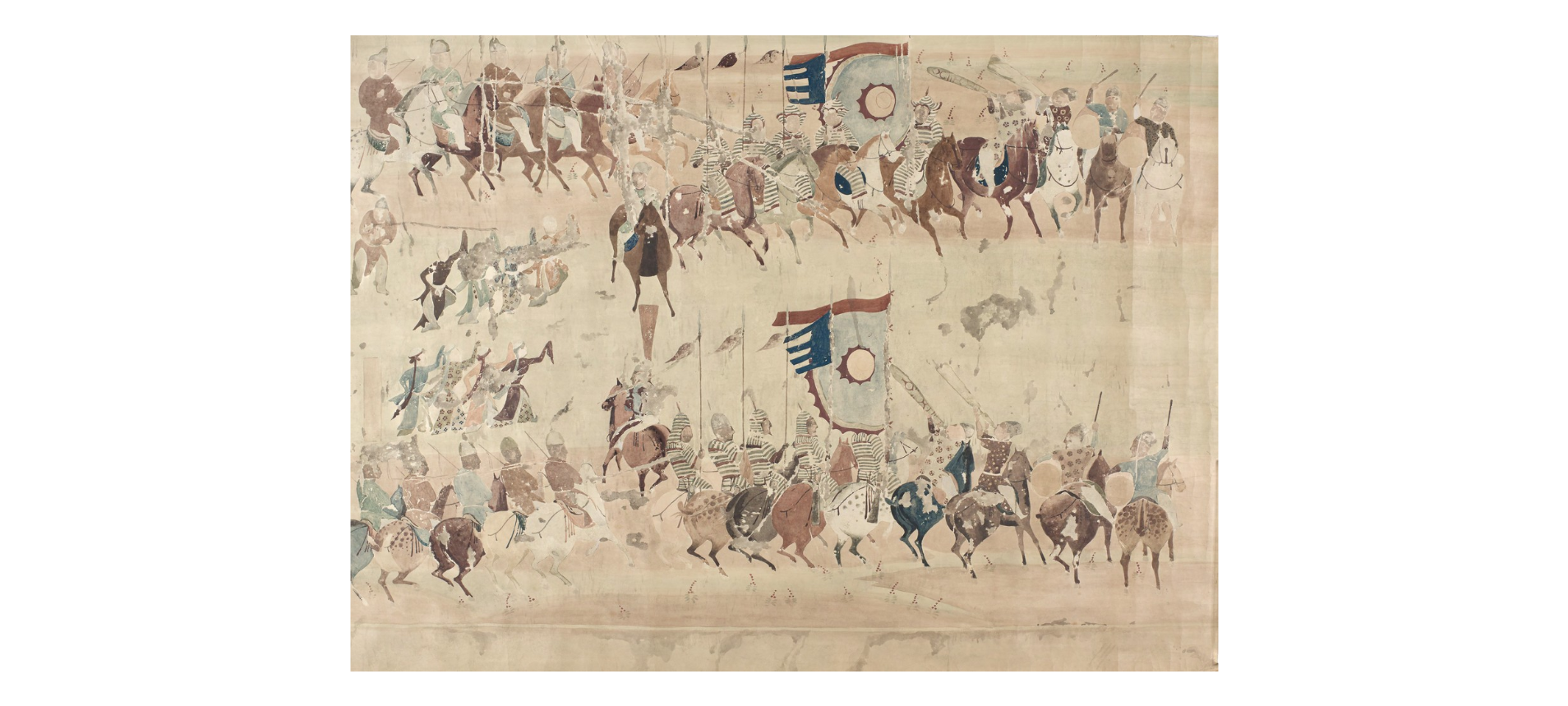
Celebrations after victory over the Tibetans

Zhang Yichao (Chinese: 張議潮 or 張義朝; pinyin: Zhāng Yìcháo; 799−872) was a Chinese military general and politician of the Tang dynasty who was a resident of Sha Prefecture (Chinese: 沙州; pinyin: Shāzhōu, in modern Dunhuang, Gansu). When the Tibetan Empire plunged into civil war, he led a rebellion, capturing several cities and reverted the area's allegiance to the Tang dynasty. He subsequently conquered the Hexi Corridor and governed it as the military commissioner (jiedushi) of Guiyi Circuit (headquartered in modern Dunhuang) under nominal authority of the Tang emperors.

== Rebellion against the Tibetans ==
Following the An Lushan Rebellion, the Tibetan Empire conquered the Sha and Gua prefectures of the Tang dynasty in 781. Han population of the locality remained. By 851, the Tibetan Empire which had ruled the southern Tarim Basin and modern Gansu region since 790 was being torn by civil war.

Zhang Yichao's father, Zhang Qianyi, once held the post of commander-in-chief of the Sha Prefecture under the Tibetan Empire. In 848, Zhang secretly planned a rebellion with the other ethnic Han, Yugur (Uyghur), Tuyuhun and Qiang residents of Sha Prefecture to return Sha Prefecture to Tang allegiance. One day, he led armed soldiers and approached the city gates, and the Han all rose in response. The Tibetan garrisons abandoned the city and fled. Zhang thereafter claimed the title of acting prefect of Sha Prefecture and submitted a petition to Emperor Xuānzong of Tang, offering his loyalty and submission. Xuānzong thus made him Official Guard (防禦使, Fangyushi) of Sha Prefecture.

Later in the year, Zhang's launched an attack on ten other nearby prefectures with Tibetan garrisons—Gua (瓜州, in modern Jiuquan, Gansu); Yi (伊州, in modern Hami Prefecture, Xinjiang); Xi (西州, in modern Turpan Prefecture, Xinjiang); Gan (甘州, in modern Zhangye, Gansu); Su (肅州, in modern Jiuquan); Lan (蘭州, in modern Lanzhou, Gansu); Shan (鄯州, in modern Haidong Prefecture, Qinghai); He (河州, in modern Linxia Hui Autonomous Prefecture, Gansu); Min (岷州, in modern Dingxi, Gansu); and Kuo (廓州, in modern Haidong). Afterwards they prepared maps of the 11 prefectures and his brother Zhang Yize (張義澤) submitted them to Xuānzong at Chang'an to prove their allegiance to the Tang dynasty. Xuānzong named the 11 prefectures Guiyi Circuit (歸義), with its capital at Sha Prefecture, and made Zhang Yichao its military commissioner and his secretary Cao Yijin (曹義金) its secretary general.

== As military governor of Guiyi ==
In 863, Zhang Yichao led a group of 7,000 Han and non-Han soldiers to capture Liang Prefecture (涼州, in modern Wuwei, Gansu).

In 866, Zhang submitted a report stating that the Uyghur chieftain Pugu Jun (僕固俊) had recaptured from the Tibetan Empire Xi Prefecture, Ting Prefecture (庭州, in modern Changji Hui Autonomous Prefecture, Xinjiang), Luntai (輪台, in modern Ürümqi, Xinjiang), and Qingzhen (清鎮, modern location unknown)—apparently implying that Pugu Jun did so under his command.

In 867, Zhang visited Chang'an and paid homage to Emperor Yizong of Tang. Yizong made him a general of the imperial guards and kept him at Chang'an. Yizong also commissioned Zhang's nephew Zhang Huaishen (張淮深) to serve as the acting military governor of Guiyi. He died in 872, probably while residing at Chang'an.

== Notes and references ==
- Zizhi Tongjian, vols. 249, 250, 252.
