= Kneeling Attendant Bodhisattva (Mogao Cave) =

Polychromed Mogao Cave Sculpture of Bodhisattva at Harvard

Kneeling Attendant Bodhisattva (from Mogao Cave 328, Dunhuang, Gansu province)
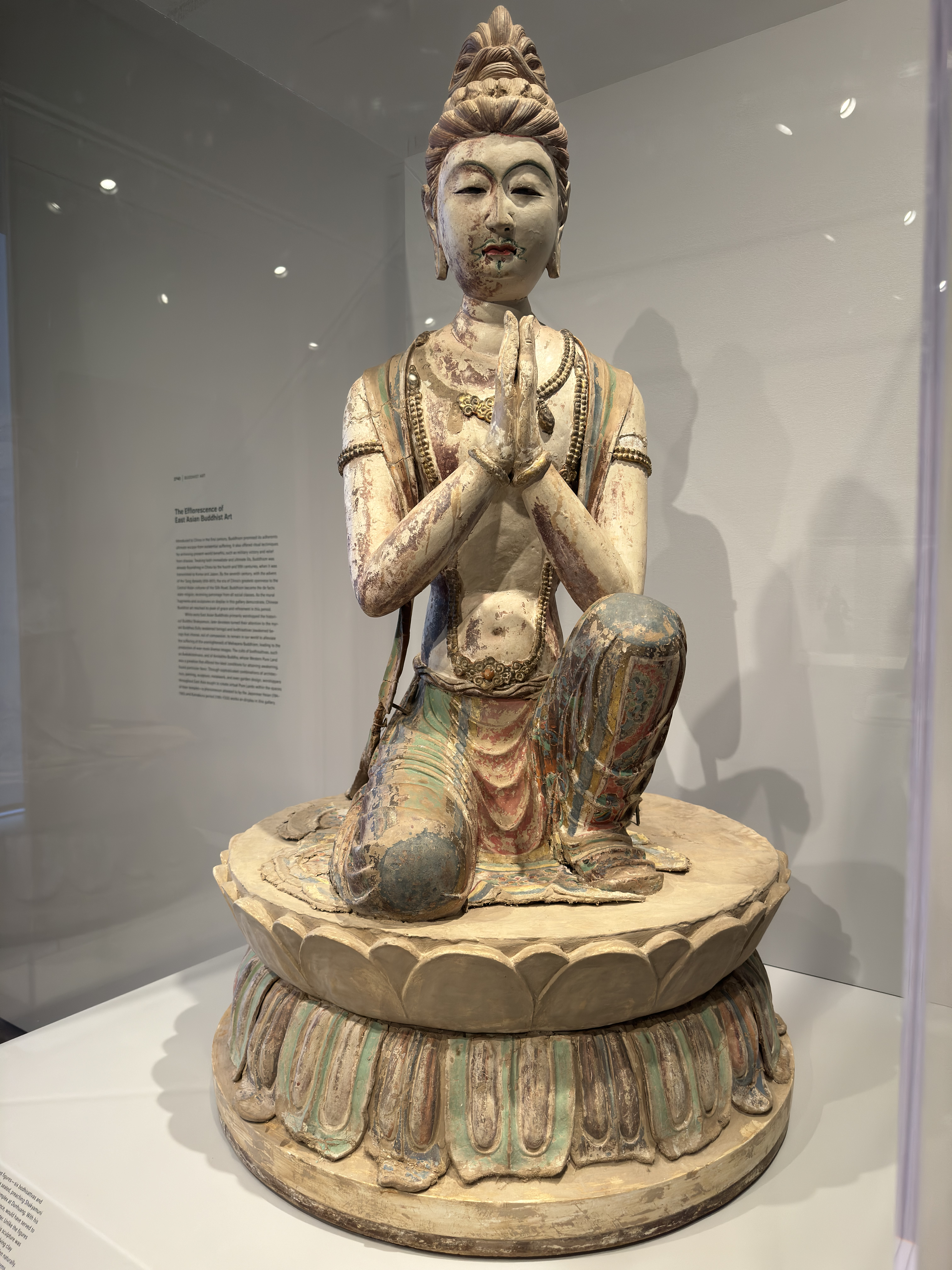
- Kneeling Bodhisattva (on display October 2024)
- Year: late 7th century
- Movement: Tang dynasty art
- Subject: Bodhisattva
- Dimensions: 121.9 cm × 67.3 cm × 67.3 cm (48.0 in × 26.5 in × 26.5 in)
- Location: Harvard Art Museum, Cambridge, Massachusetts
- Accession: 1924.70

The Kneeling Attendant Bodhisattva is a late 7th century, polychromed Buddhist sculpture, dating to the Tang dynasty, depicting a kneeling bodhisattva. Once a part of a set of eight figures, depicting six bodhisattvas and two disciples of the Buddha, it was once a part of the Mogao Caves, but is currently on display at the Harvard Art Museum.

== Mogao Cave 328 ==
The Mogao Caves, in Dunhuang, Gansu Province, China served as a major nexus of Buddhist pilgrimages from the Northern Liang to the Song dynasty.

Consisting of over 492 niches and caves, with well over a millennia of Buddhist art, Cave 328 was established during the early years of the Tang Dynasty, when the caves saw high flow of pilgrims.

In an area covering 6 meters squared, the niche depicts the Buddha preaching, right hand in the Abhayamudra, with a combination of two-dimensional and three-dimensional painting and sculpture of his disciples and attendants. Kashyapa and Ānanda are seen at the side, absorbed in thought. The entire niche was intended to depict the dissemination of the Lotus Sutra.

It is likely dated to the reign of Wu Zetian.

The attending bodhisattvas are also depicted in sculpture, legs bent on a lotus throne, with leisurely posture. The artists who designed the cave intended for realist aesthetics. The well-preserved polychromy and artistic diversity of the cave attest to the prosperity and diversity of the Tang Empire.

== Harvard Art Museum Acquisition ==
The Mogao Caves saw increased exploration by the western world with expeditions held by Aurel Stein and Paul Pelliot in the 19th century. In 1923, the Fogg Museum curator Langdon Warner (Harvard Class of 1903) organized the Fogg Expedition to China, as part of an effort to expand the studies of Asian Art in Harvard.

Murals from Dunhuang were extracted upon arrival in January 1924 focused on the Tang Caves of Mogao, which in addition to 328, included Caves 320, 321, 323, and 335. The treatment of the art in the expedition continues to be subject to controversy due to the damaged caused to the caves.

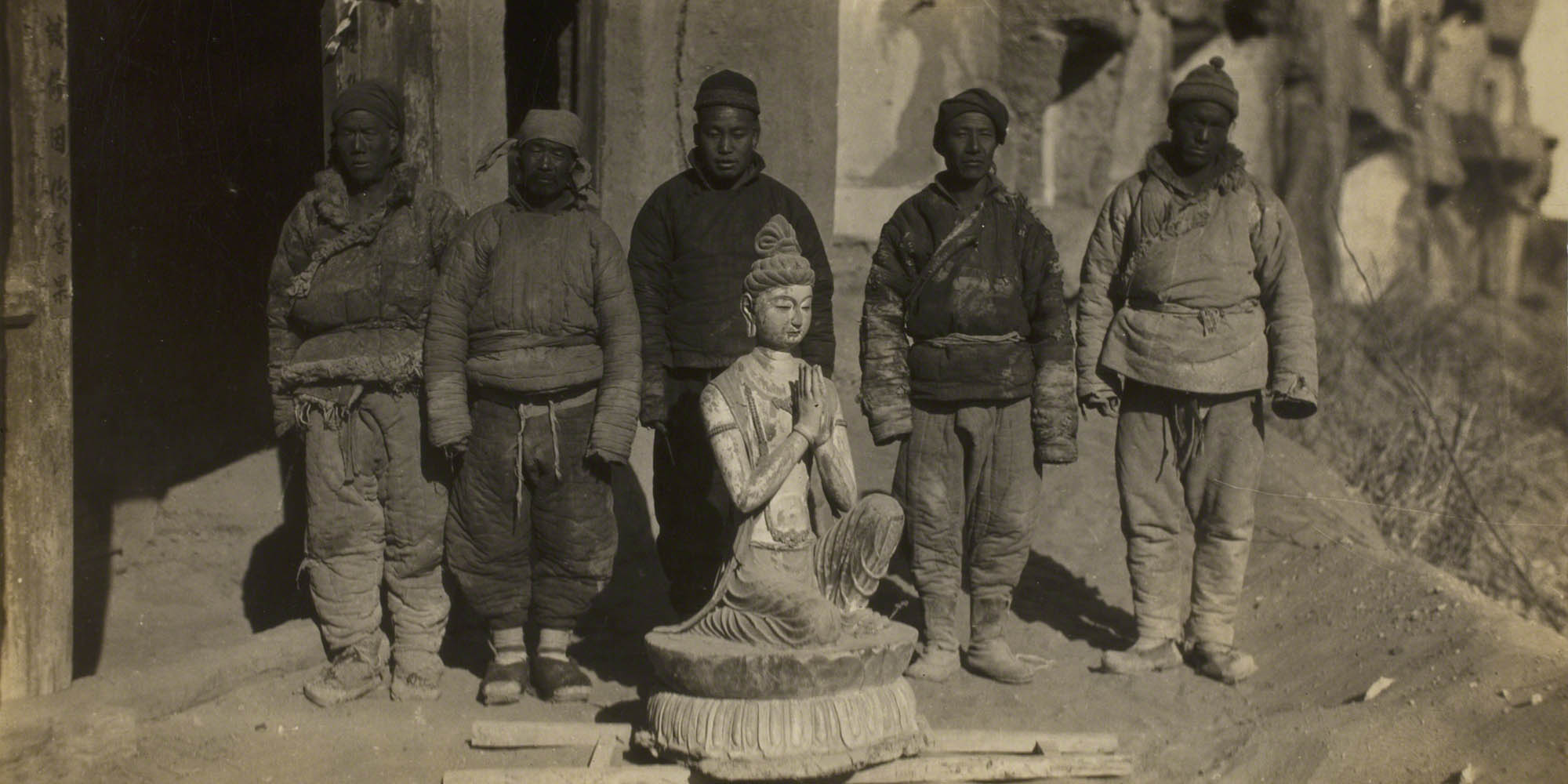
The Kneeling Bodhisattva upon extraction from Cave 328 (1924)

The Attending Bodhisattva was among the objects subsequently removed, it is now catalogued under designated accession number 1924.70.

== Description ==
While works from Tianlongshan Grottoes are made of stone, the medium of the Dunhuang sculptures are that of clay, fibers, and straw, fixated on wooden armature and naturally dried and hardened, which serves as the skeleton of the bodhisattva.

The kneeling attendant was once part of the three slender bodhisattvas that were placed outside of the Buddha's niche, on the south side of the cave, on the left side, facing the north wall, as if to guide the worshippers to the main image.

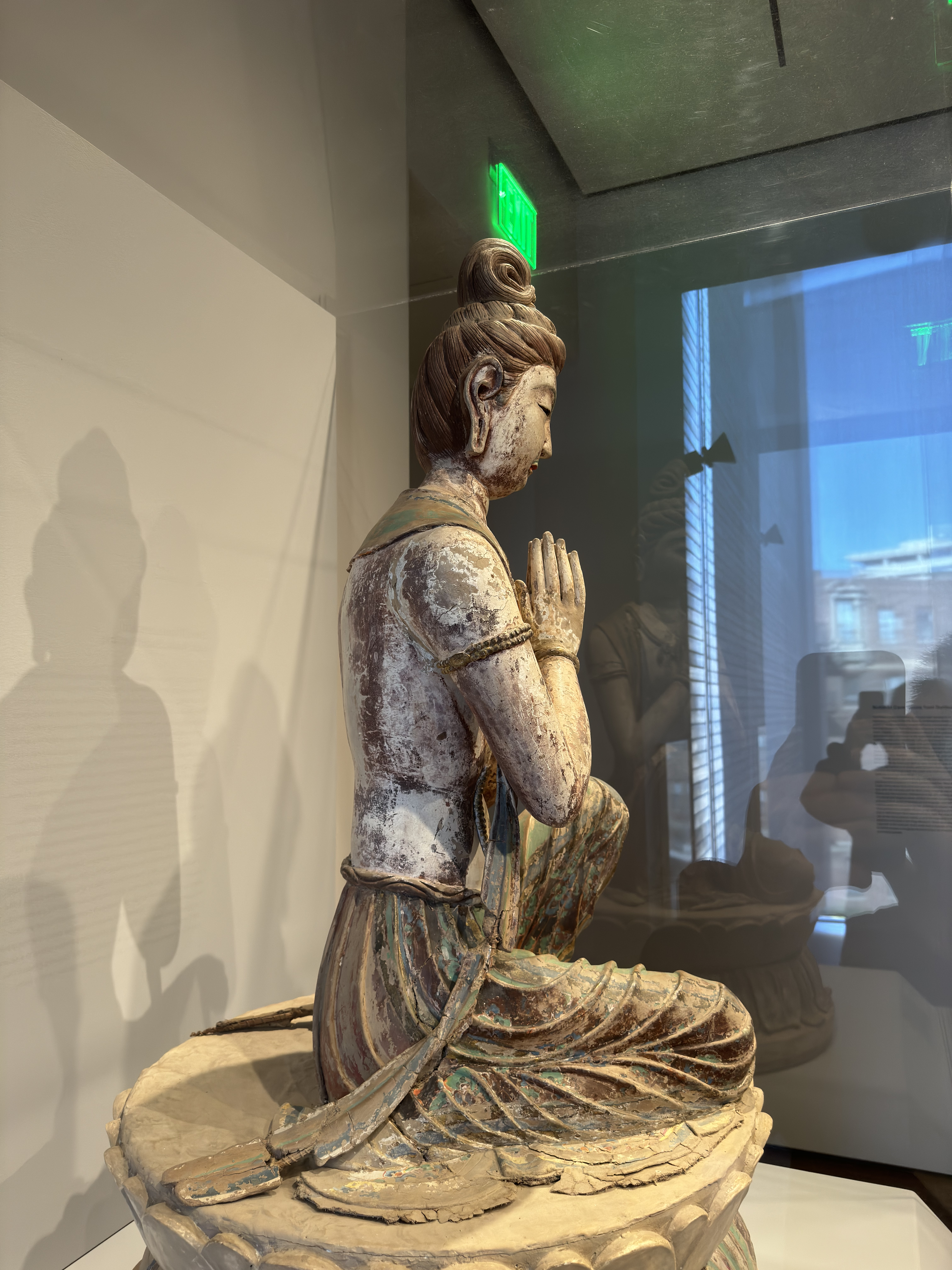
Side Profile

The bodhisattva's is postured with its head inclined slightly forward, hands pressed in Añjali Mudrā. Its upper body wears a scarf draped upon the shoulders, a jeweled necklace, with the dhoti covering the legs and feet. The double lotus base on which it resides is a fundamental feature of Chinese Buddhist aesthetics, and emphasizes upon the themes of the Lotus Sutra, which also saw primary dominance in the Buddhist canon during the early Tang.

== Conservation ==
Since the 1990s, the Dunhuang Research Academy was dedicated to preserving and reconstructing the original images of the caves prior to much of the damages from the 19th-20th centuries.

In 2016, Shanghai Haohan Digital Technology took part in the effort to create a digital render of Cave 328, of which their goal was to include the Kneeling Bodhisattva as a digital asset to reunite the sculpture to its original placement.

== See also ==
- Fogg Banner of Eleven-Headed Guanyin - a painting from Mogao Caves held in the Harvard Art Museums' collection
