= Cao Zongshou =

Governor of the Guiyi Circuit in Dunhuang at the turn of the 11th century

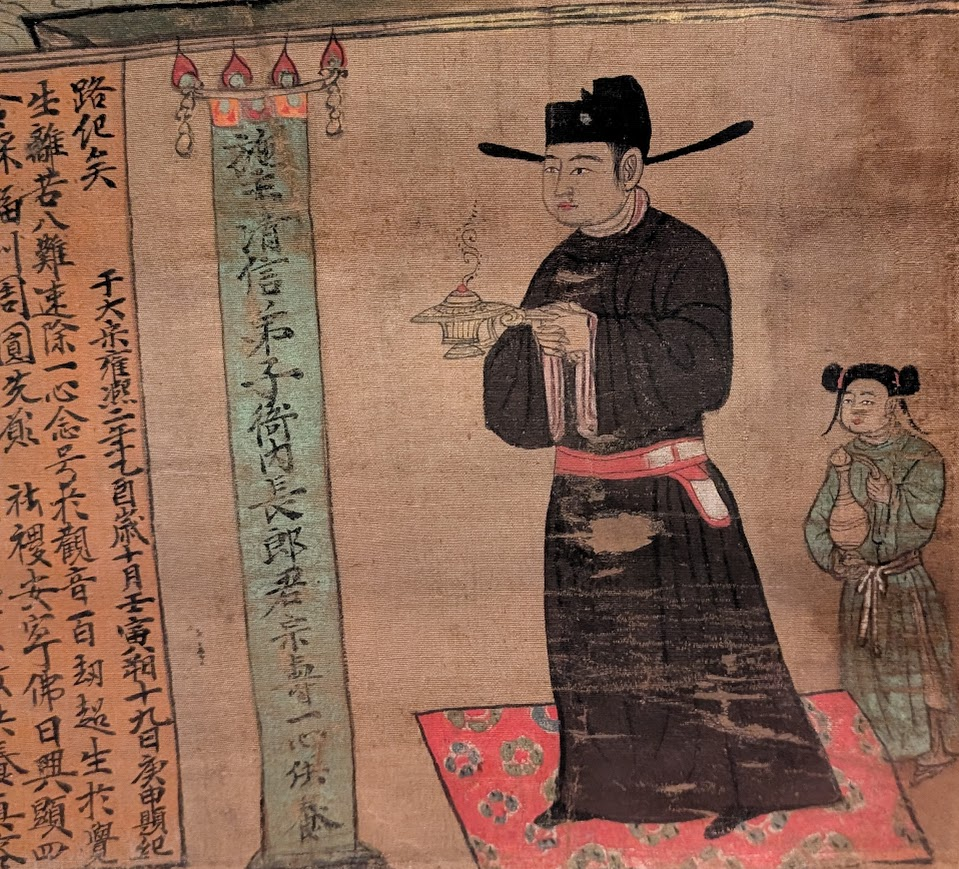
Cao Zongshou (曹宗寿) - as depicted on the Fogg Banner of Eleven-Headed Guanyin (985)

Cao Zongshou (Chinese: 曹宗寿)(unknown - d. 1014) was the seventh governor (jiedushi - 曹宗寿) of the Guiyi Circuit, whose jurisdiction famously included Dunhuang, during the Song dynasty.

His earliest recorded presence was in a banner depicting Guanyin, currently held by the Harvard Art Museum created in 985. There, he is dedicating the work to the late monk Yuanman, who resided over in the Mogao Caves.

According to the History of Song, he is the nephew of his predecessor, Cao Yanlu (曹延祿), where at the time, he held the position of quanzhi liuhou (deputy commander). In the year 1002, he rebelled against his uncle, resulting in Cao Yuanlu and Yuanlu's brother, Cao Yanrui (曹延瑞) committing suicide.

With approval of Emperor Zhenzong, he inherited the title of jiedushi of the Guiyi Circuit, with his younger brother, Cao Zongyun occupying his previous position as quanzhi liuhou. Meanwhile his son, Cao Xianshun (曹賢順) took on the post of yanei duzhihuishi (Commander-in-Chief of Palace Guards). In the same year, he and his wife, Lady Fan, was documented donating a large batch and last dated set of sutras to Mogao Caves, in a document now held at the Institute of Oriental Manuscripts of the Russian Academy of Sciences.

He died in the year 1014, and his son Cao Xianshun took his place as the eighth jiedushi of Guiyi. His brother, Cao Yanhui, became jianjiao xingbushangshu (Acting Ministry of the Department of State Affairs), which included jurisdiction of Guazhou County.
