= Caleb Warner =

Caleb Warner (September 12, 1922 – August 24, 2017) was a marine and acoustical engineer and a classical trumpeter, who was best known for co-designing the Baldwin Spinet Electric harpsichord which was used on The Beatles' song "Because".

== Biography ==
Warner was the son of Harvard professor Langdon Warner. He attended Phillips Exeter Academy in New Hampshire, before studying acoustical and marine engineering at the University of Michigan, graduating in 1944. He served with the US Navy during World War II. He received an American-Scandinavian Foundation fellowship in 1947 to undertake further study in Sweden.

During the 1960s, while working as a development engineer, Warner, with Eric Herz, designed harpsichords for the Cannon Guild, founded by James H. Cannon, Jr. One of the harpsichords co-designed and built by Warner was the Baldwin Spinet Electric harpsichord which was used on The Beatles' song Because, and for the brief postlude on The Who's Live at Leeds album, and others. Warner also designed and produced solid body rehearsal harpsichords and dulcimers. His harpsichords included examples with aluminium frames and electronic amplification. A harpsichord with a steel frame and a formica case, designed by Warner and Herz, accompanied Joel Spiegelman on an exchange visit to the USSR in 1965. Another Warner-designed and built harpsichord was gifted by a donor to the Chicago Symphony Orchestra in 1961.

Warner himself played the trumpet, and specialised in the music of Bach and his contemporaries.
