= Edwin Atlee Barber =

American archaeologist

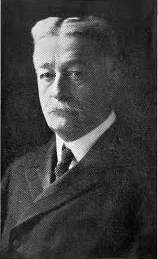
Edwin Atlee Barber (1915

Edwin Atlee Barber (August 13, 1851 – December 12, 1916) was an American archaeologist and author.

== Biography ==
Edwin Atlee Barber was born in Baltimore, Maryland to William Edwin Barber and Anne Eliza Townsend. He entered Lafayette College in 1869 but left before graduating to assume a position as an assistant naturalist for the Hayden Survey. He developed an interest in decorated pottery and rapidly became an authority in Pueblo ceramic art. He contributed several articles to the American Naturalist about his work with the Hayden Survey. He returned to Lafayette College and graduated in 1877. In 1881, Barber was elected as a member to the American Philosophical Society.

Edwin received a graduate degree from Lafayette College in 1893 and began working as curator of ceramics at the Pennsylvania Museum and School of Industrial Art becoming the director in 1907.

=== Marriage and children ===
On February 5, 1880 he married Nellie Louise Parker and in 1883 she gave birth to their only child Louise Atlee Barber.

== Published works ==
- Language and Utensils of the Modern Utes. 1876
- The Ancient Pottery of Colorado, Utah, Arizona and New Mexico. 1876
- Bead Ornaments Employed by the Ancient Tribes of Utah and Arizona. 1876
- Comparative Vocabulary of Utah Dialects. 1877
- Moqui Food-Preparations. 1878
- The Ancient Pueblos; or, The Ruins of the Valley of the Rio San Juan. 1878
- The Pottery and Porcelain of the United States 1893
- Tulip Ware of the Pennsylvania-German Potters An Historical Sketch of the Art of Slip-Decoration in the United States. 1903
- Marks of American Potters. 1904
- Tin Enamelled Pottery. 1907
- The Maiolica of Mexico.1908

== See also ==
- List of Directors of the Philadelphia Museum of Art

Cultural offices
Preceded by William Platt Pepper	Director of the Philadelphia Museum of Art; 1907–1916	Succeeded by Langdon Warner
