= Miraculous Image of Liangzhou =

8th-century silk embroidered artwork

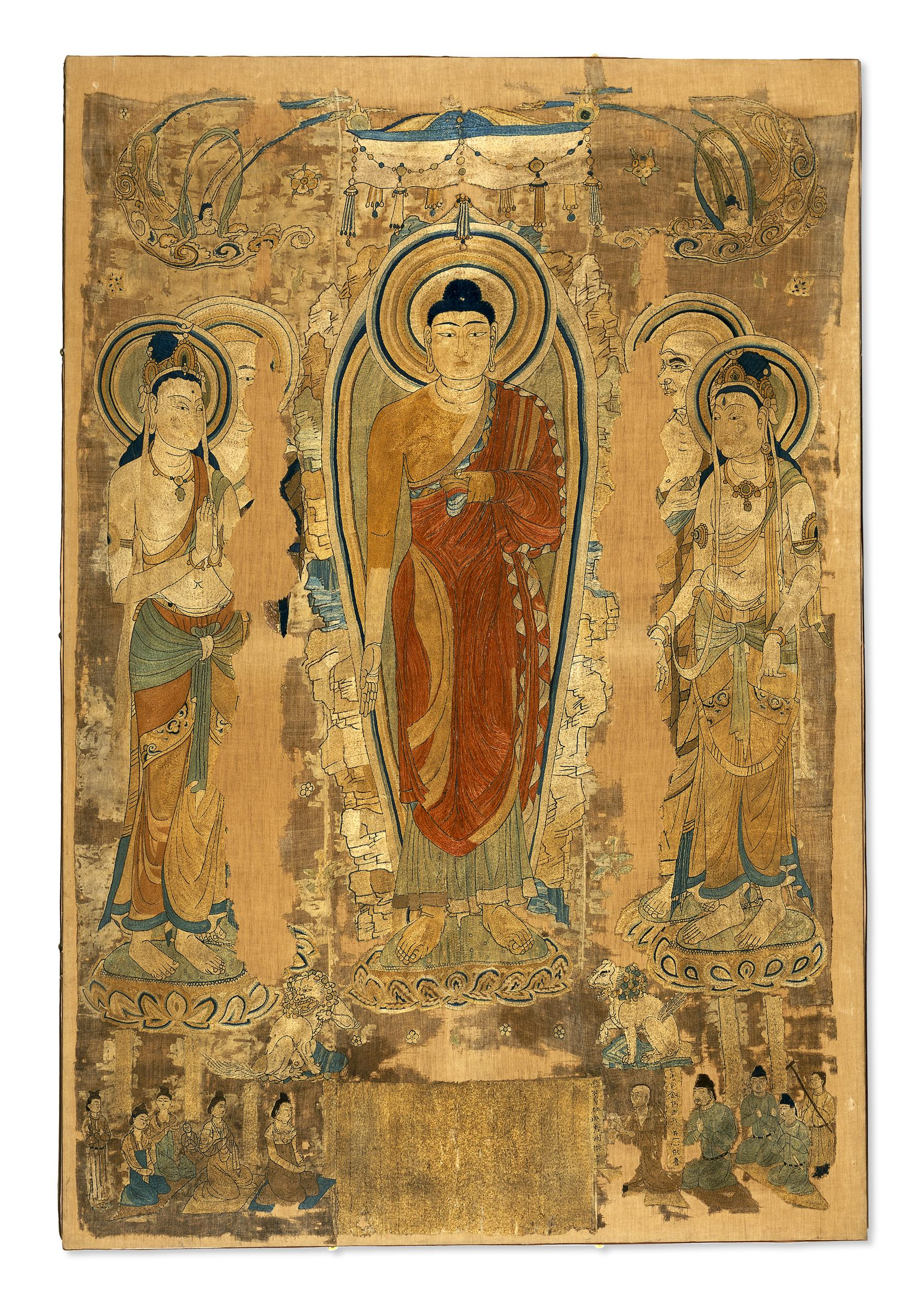
- Material: Silk
- Size: 2.4 m high, 1.6 m wide
- Created: 8th century AD
- Present location: British Museum, London
- Registration: MAS,0.1129

The Miraculous Image of Liangzhou is an 8th-century silk embroidery on hemp cloth found in the Mogao Caves in China, as part of the large deposit of various types of artefact uncovered in a sealed off library in 1907 by Sir Aurel Stein.

== Description ==
Originally interpreted as Sakyamuni preaching on the Vulture Peak, the embroidered scene is now thought to depict a Buddha emerging from a rocky mountain in Liangzhou. The Buddha, standing under a jewelled canopy, is flanked by the bodhisattvas Ananda (left) and Kashyapa (right). Two apsaras are depicted above, while two lions overlook male and female donor figures at the bottom.

== Conservation ==
In 2017, the British Museum published a video series detailing the conservation process of the embroidery.

== See also ==
- Mogao Christian painting
- Fogg Banner of Eleven-Headed Guanyin

== Bibliography ==
- Sue Brunning, Luk Yu-ping, Elisabeth R. O'Connell, Tim Williams: Silk Roads (British Museum Press, 2024)
