= Langdon Warner =

American art historian

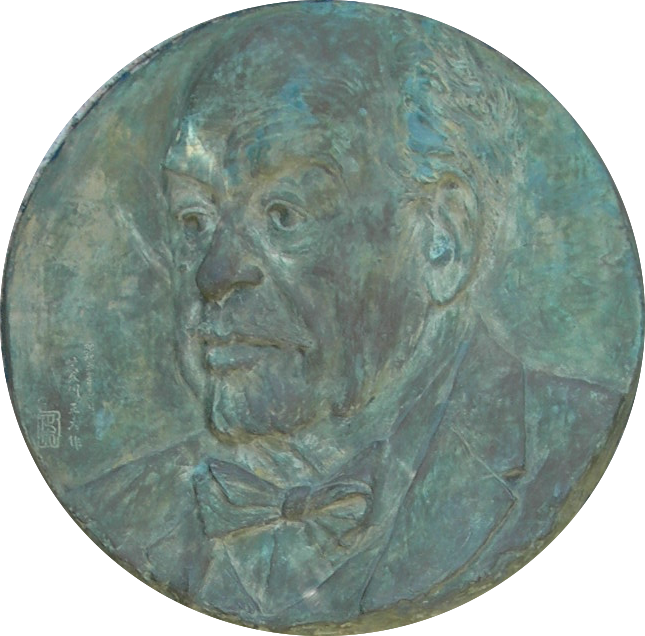
Langdon Warner medallion on stele in Kamakura

Langdon Warner (1 August 1881 – 9 June 1955) was an American archaeologist and art historian specializing in East Asian art. He was a professor at Harvard and the Curator of Oriental Art at Harvard's Fogg Museum. He is reputed to be one of the models for Steven Spielberg's Indiana Jones. As an explorer/agent at the turn of the 20th century, he studied the Silk Road. He was elected a Fellow of the American Academy of Arts and Sciences in 1927.

== Early life and career ==
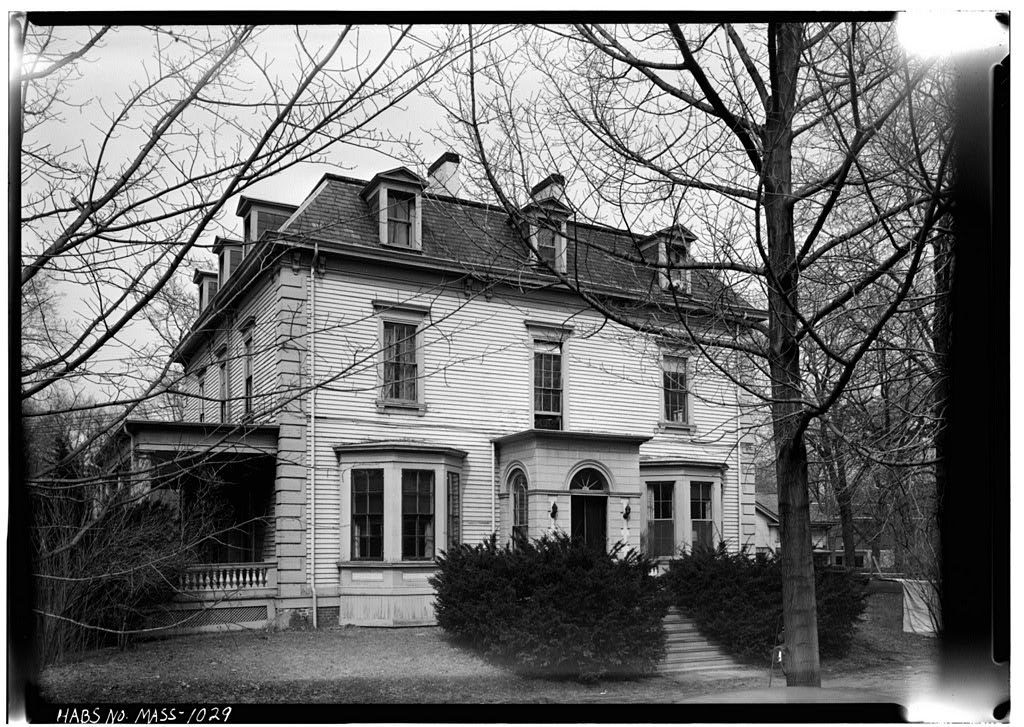
Warner House 36 Garden Street

Warner's father was Joseph B. Warner, described as one of Cambridge's "foremost citizens," and his mother, Margaret Woodbury Storer, was daughter of an established Cambridge family with abolitionist sympathies. In 1910, he married Lorraine d'Oremieulx Roosevelt. The couple had four children: Lorraine Warner, b. Chestnut Hill, Massachusettss, Aug. 12, 1911; Margaret [Margot] Warner, b. Cambridge, November 30, 1915; a child born and died 1918; Caleb Warner, b. Cambridge, 12 September 1922. Langdon inherited the family house at 36 Garden Street, later known as "Warner House."

Warner graduated from Harvard College in 1903 with a specialty in Buddhist art and an interest in archeology. After several field trips to Asia, he returned to Harvard, where he taught the university's first courses in Japanese and Chinese art. The Smithsonian Institution sent him to Asia in 1913, and he spent more than a year there, but World War I interrupted his work. In 1922 the Fogg Museum again sent him to China.

From 1930 to 1935 he was adviser on Asian art for the Nelson-Atkins Museum of Art, Kansas City. One scholar notes that acquisitions for the Nelson were "far from comprehensive," but show what Japanese art was on the market at the time and the preferences of museum-goers.

== Frescoes at Dunhuang and controversy over the removal of antiquities ==
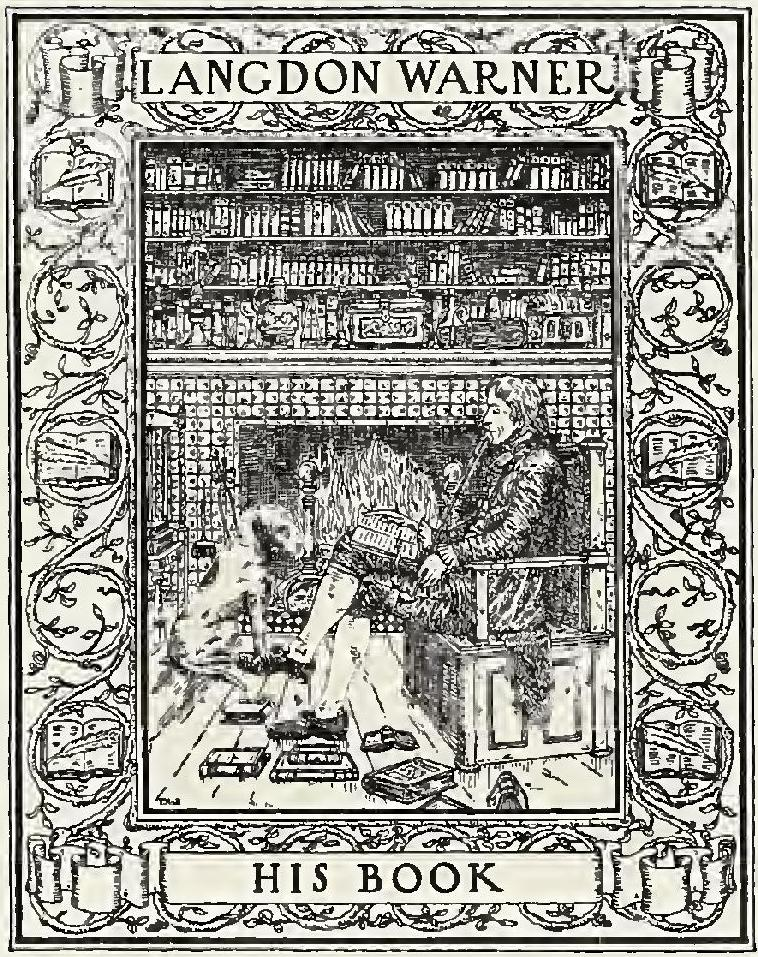
Langdon Warner bookplate

Langdon Warner's work in China is the subject of much controversy among art historians. On the one side, there are those who say that he pillaged sites in Asia of their art, in particular, frescos from the Mogao caves at Dunhuang. In 1922, the Fogg Museum sent Warner to China to explore western China. He arrived at the Mogao Caves in Dunhuang in January 1924 and, armed with a special chemical solution for detaching wall-paintings, he removed twenty-six Tang dynasty masterpieces from caves 335, 321, 323 & 320. Warner first applied the chemical solution (strong glue) to the painting on the cave wall. He then placed a cloth against it. The cloth was then pulled away from the fresco and then he applied plaster of Paris on the back of the painting and transferred the painting to the plaster surface. Warner had found evidence that the caves were the object of vandalism by Russian soldiers and reached an agreement with the local people to purchase the frescoes and remove them in order to save them for posterity. Unfortunately, the removal process resulted in some damage to the site itself. Luckily, frescoes he framed with glue but were unable to remove are still on display in the caves today. Only five of the 26 fragments of murals that he removed are in good enough condition to be exhibited now in the Harvard Art Museums, Cambridge, Massachusetts. Another object of significance removed included a Kneeling Bodhisattva from Cave 328.

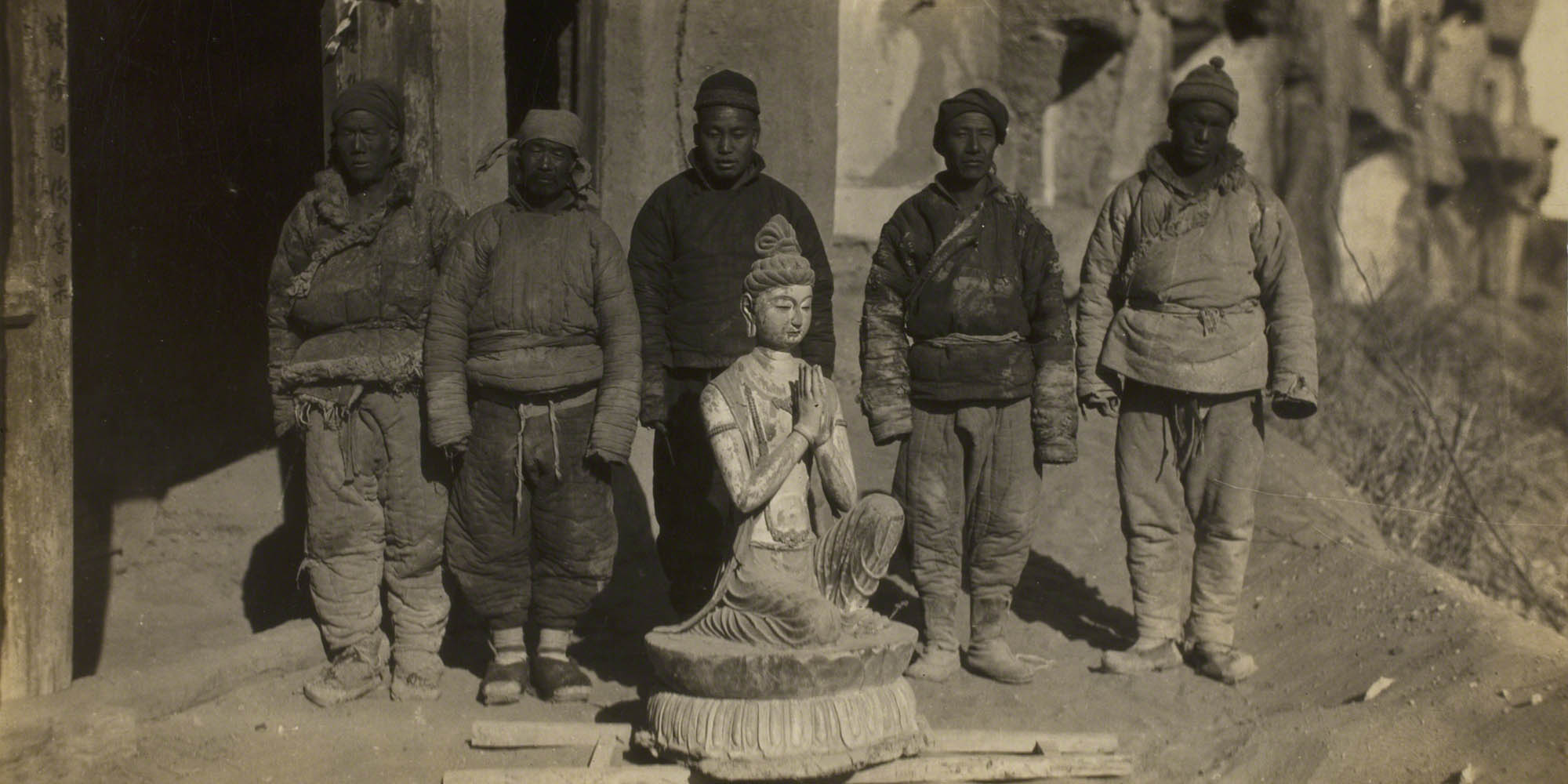
The Kneeling Attendant Bodhisattva sculpture, removed in the 1923-1924 Fogg Expedition

The views of the Chinese government towards Warner have varied as intensively as the government itself over the last century. In 1931, the National Commission for the Preservation of Antiquities declared that archeological objects could only be taken from the country if there is no one in the country "sufficiently competent or interested in studying or safe-keeping them. Otherwise," the Commission concluded, "it is no longer scientific archeology but commercial vandalism." Warner himself viewed his work as a heroic act of preserving art from destruction. He defended taking fragments from the Longmen Grottoes, saying "If we are ever criticized for buying those chips, the love and labor and the dollars we spent on assembling them should silence all criticism. That in itself is a service to the cause of China bigger than anyone else in this country has ever made." It is worth noting, though, that most of the destruction was done to fill orders placed by western collectors using images provide by the buyers.

Today the caves in Dunhuang are favored as tourist stops to showcase the Chinese view that the Americans pillaged their heritage. Certain members of the family have requested that the museum return the pieces to Dunhuang. The museum's position is that since they have a bill of sale indicating that Warner legitimately purchased the artwork, they have no obligation to return them. The Warner family acknowledges both points of view on the matter and seeks resolution.

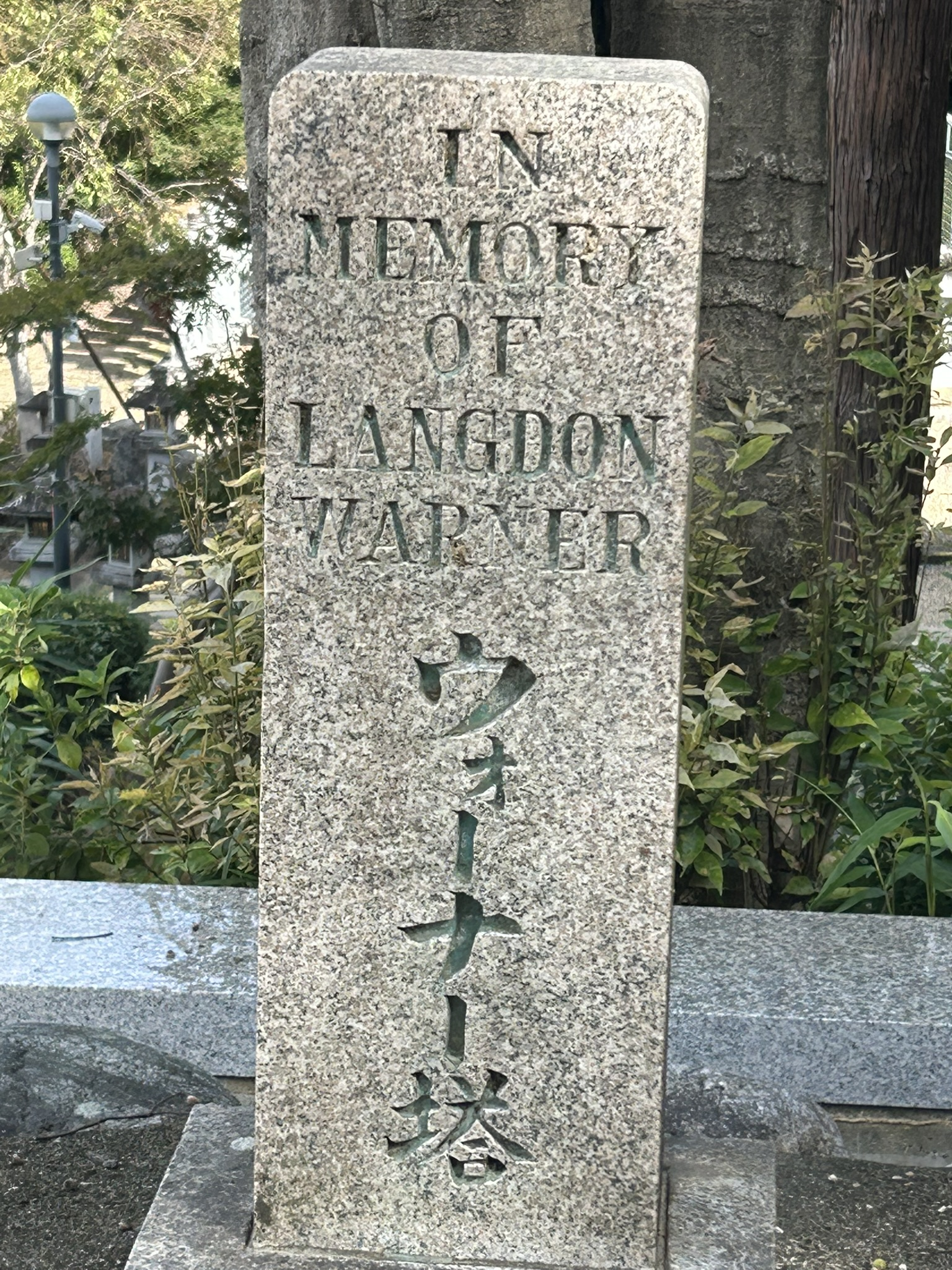

== World War II ==
Warner's archaeological career was interrupted by the United States' entry into World War II and he became part of the Monuments, Fine Arts and Archives (MFAA) Section of the U.S. Army. He was brought on as an advisor to the MFAA Section in Japan from April to September 1946.

He has been given credit by some for advising against firebombing and the use of the atomic bomb on Kyoto, Nara, and Kamakura and other ancient cities to protect cultural heritage of Japan. There are monuments erected in Kyoto, Hōryū-ji (outside the western edge of Hōryū-ji temple), Sakurai, Nara at Abe Monju-in Temple and Kamakura (outside Kamakura JR Station) in his honor for this reason. However, Otis Cary has argued that the credit for sparing Japan's cultural heritage sites belongs not to Langdon but to the U.S. Secretary of War, Henry L. Stimson.

== Major works ==
- The Long Old Road in China (1926)
- The Craft of the Japanese Sculptor (1936)
- Buddhist Wall-Paintings: A Study of a Ninth-Century Grotto at Wan Fo Hsia (1938)
- The Enduring Art of Japan (1952)
- Japanese Sculpture of the Tempyo Period: Masterpieces of the Eighth Century (1959)

== See also ==
- Caleb Warner — his son
- List of Directors of the Philadelphia Museum of Art

== Notes ==
Cultural offices
Preceded by Edwin Atlee Barber	Director of the Philadelphia Museum of Art; 1917–1923	Succeeded by Fiske Kimball
