= Empress Dowager Liang =

Empress Dowager Liang (梁太后) may refer to:

- Liang Na (116–150), empress dowager of the Han dynasty
- Empress Gongsu (died 1085), empress dowager of the Western Xia dynasty during Emperor Huizong (Li Bingchang)'s reign
- Empress Zhaojian (died 1099), empress dowager of the Western Xia dynasty during Emperor Chongzong (Li Qianshun)'s reign

== See also ==
- Empress Liang (disambiguation)
