= Qiandao =

Qiandao may refer to:

- Qiandao Lake, a human-made lake in Chun'an County, Zhejiang, China

== Historical eras ==
- Qiandao (乾道, 1067?–1068), era name used by Emperor Huizong of Western Xia
- Qiandao (乾道, 1165–1173), era name used by Emperor Xiaozong of Song
