= Empress Liang =

Empress Liang (梁皇后) may refer to:

- Liang Na (116–150), empress of the Han dynasty, married to Emperor Shun (Liu Bao)
- Liang Nüying (died 159), empress of the Han dynasty, married to Emperor Huan (Liu Zhi)
- Liang Lanbi (fl. 305–311), empress of the Jin dynasty
- Empress Liang (Former Qin) (died 355), empress of the Former Qin dynasty
- Empress Liang (Xia) (fl. 414), empress of the Xia state during the Sixteen Kingdoms period
- Empress Gongsu (died 1085), empress of the Western Xia dynasty, married to Emperor Yizong (Li Liangzuo)
- Empress Zhaojian (died 1099), empress of the Western Xia dynasty, married to Emperor Huizong (Li Bingchang)

== See also ==
- Queen Liang (fl. 429), queen of the Western Qin state
