= Ningling Ge =

Crown prince of Western Xia dynasty

Ningling Ge (Chinese: 寧令哥 or 寧林格; 1032–1048) was a crown prince of the Western Xia dynasty and the fourth son of the Emperor Jingzong, the founding monarch. Ningling Ge was a member of the Tangut Weiming (嵬名) clan.

"Ningling" (寧令, Tangut: 𘟙𘜶) was his Tangut title, which meant "Grand Prince", while "Ge" (哥) was his personal name.

== Life ==
Ge was born in 1032 to empress Yeli. He also had one elder brother, Ning Ming (寧明, "Prince Ming") and one younger brother, Xili (錫狸).

In 1042, Ge's elder brother Ning Ming was murdered by Yuanhao for practicing Taoism. Another brother, Xili, died prematurely. Anxious about the deaths of the princes, Emperor Jingzong appointed Ge as Crown Prince. Ge was favoured by his father for his talents, force and beautiful appearance. Emperor Jingzong had high hopes for his son. Henceforth, the emperor prepared him for the succession. However, Ge presented a rather pacifist side and did not support an aggressive and highly expensive foreign policy.

Yuanhao once took his son along to the battlefield during the war with the Song dynasty. Ge was hurt by an arrow on the battlefield and brought by Western Xia general Muoyi Jieshan (沒移皆山) to his house for recuperation. When Ge woke up, he saw a girl staying near the bed, who was revealed to be a daughter of Jieshan. The prince tried to grip the girl but she shyly hid behind the curtain. Ge came closer to the girl. From that on, they developed an intimate relationship. After the recovery, Ge knelt so as to seek agreement for the marriage with general Muoyi's daughter. Both Jieshan and Lady Muoyi supported Ge's desire. Lady Muoyi was bestowed a title of Crown Princess.

In 1047, Empress Xiancheng, Lady Yeli, was demoted to a commoner and confined to a nunnery due to machinations by Lady Mozang, sister of Mozang Epang. Lady Mozang had framed his mother for a romance with the official Buxiqi Duosi (补細乞多巳), with the help of Yeli Yuqi, brother of Empress Yeli. Lady Mozang and Mozang Epang still plotted to harm Lady Yeli's son and supported the succession of Lady Mozang's son, Ningling Liangcha despite his age (Liangcha was several months old and therefore was unable to rule on his own).

In 1048, Emperor Jingzong seduced Ningling Ge's wife, Lady Muoyi (沒移氏) and conferred upon her the title of Empress. Ge's mother's maternal clansmen and Epang instructed Ge to kill the emperor so as support his later ascension to the throne. On 19 January 1048, Ningling Ge broke into Li Yuanhao's chambers, seizing upon the fact that his father was drunk. The only action Ge managed to undertake was chopping off Yuanhao's nose. Ningling Ge went for backup to Mozang Epang because Ge had become frightened that his father might actually die. Epang betrayed his accomplice by turning him in as an assassin, which led to the execution of the crown prince. Li Yuanhao was able to survive the assassination attempt. However, he succumbed to his wounds two days later.

Ningling Ge was executed for assassination by Mozang Epang and didn't receive any posthumous name customary for crown princes who failed to ascend to the imperial throne.

== Family ==
- Father: Emperor Jingzong of Western Xia, Li Yuanhao
- Mother: Empress Xiancheng (憲成皇后野利氏), lady Yeli
- Spouse: Crown Princess, Lady Muoyi (沒移氏)
