= Fashion in Western Xia =

Western Xia fashion

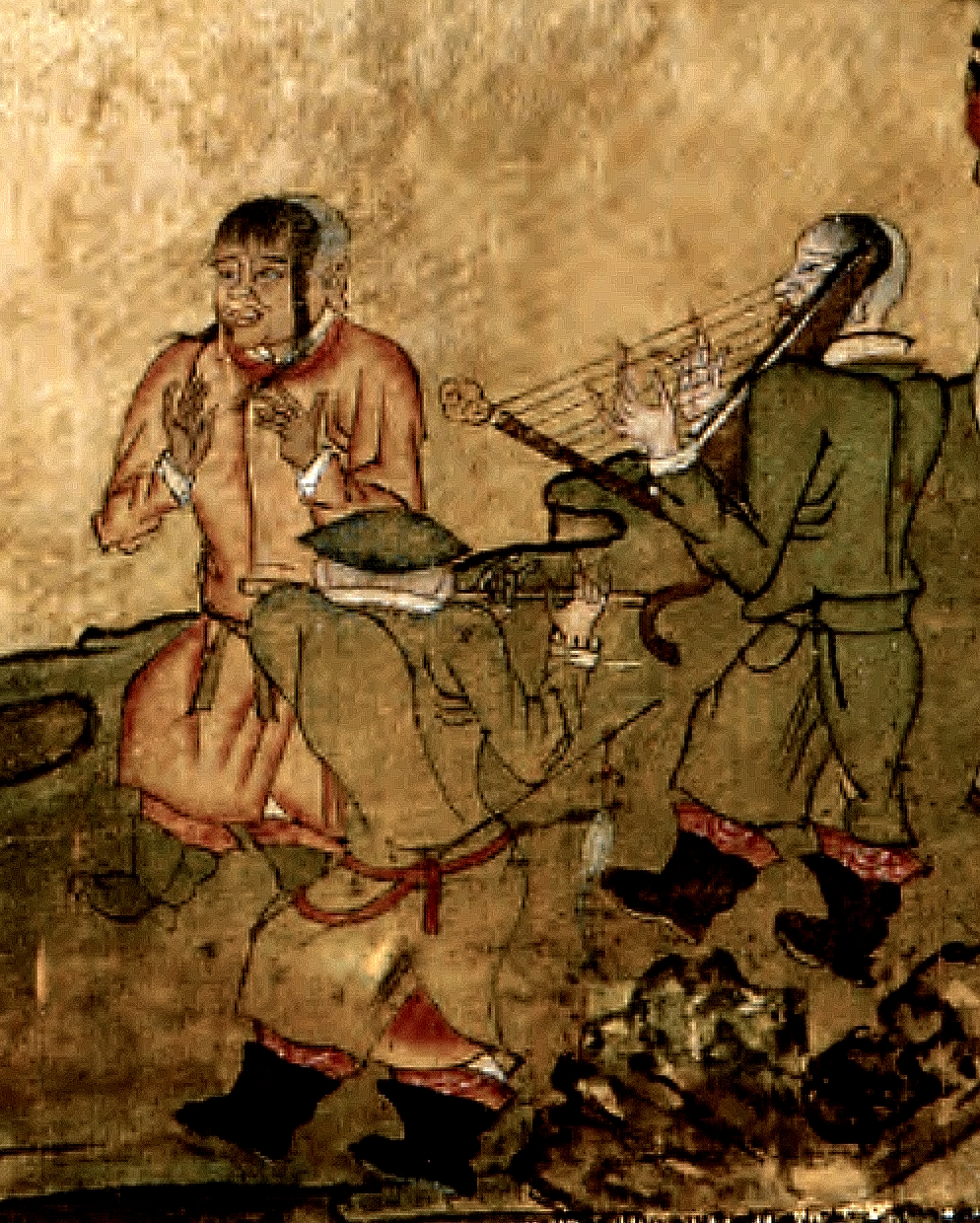
Moon-Water Bodhisattva Kuanyin, detail of entertainers. China, Tangut State of Xi-Xia, Khara Khoto. 10-13th century. State Hermitage Museum

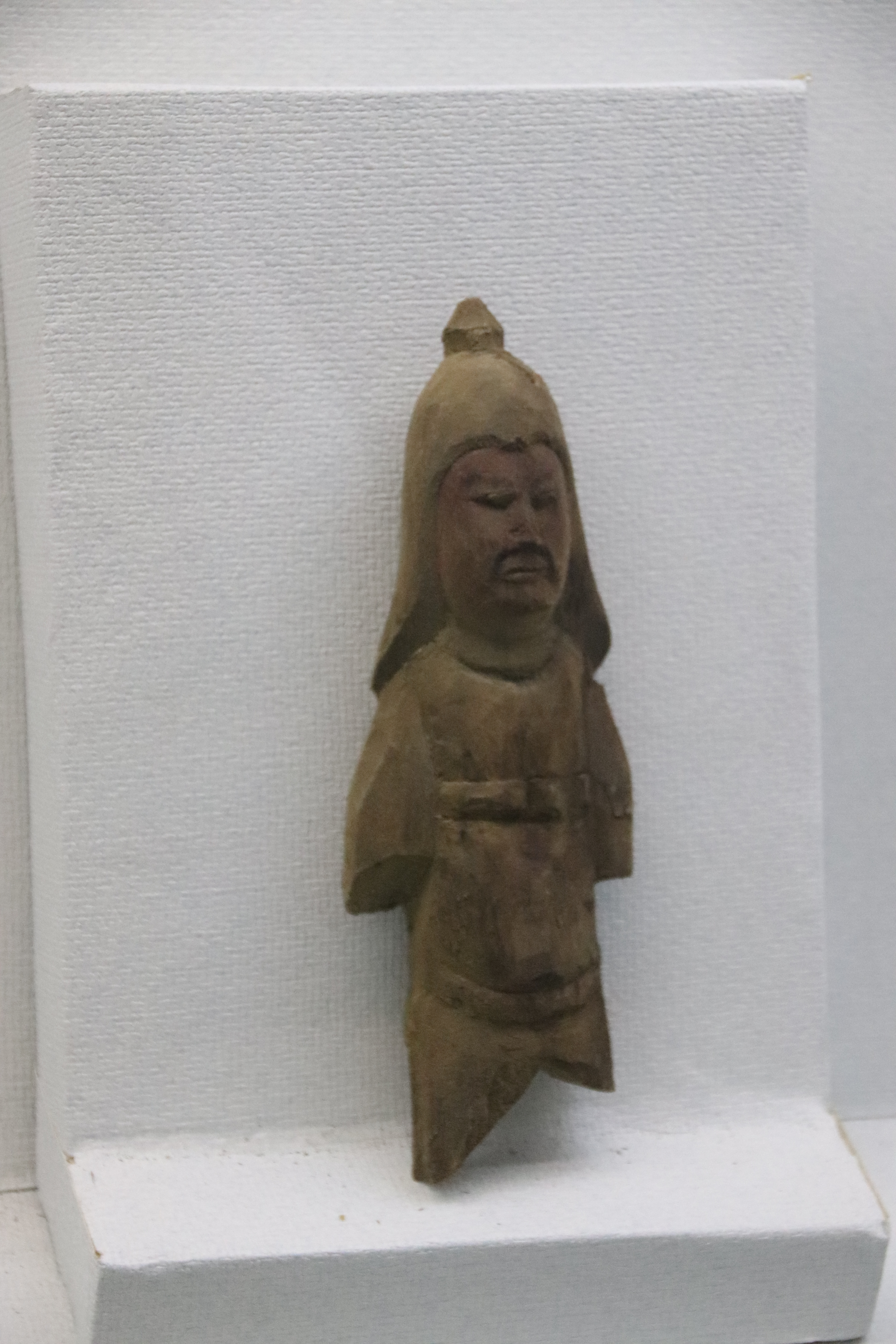
Wooden soldier figurine, Western Xia

The founder of the Western Xia dynasty of China (1038–1227), Li Yuanhao (Emperor Jingzong), established an apparel system for all civil and military officials characterized by Tangut culture. Han-style and Tangut-style clothing were distinguished from each other, but both were used in the Western Xia. The Emperor Jingzong also ordered that all subjects of the Western Xia must be shaved in an attempt to restore old Xianbei customs, and disobedience would result in death penalty.

== Clothing of Emperors ==
The emperor of Western Xia wore round-collar gown with dragons roundels, high hats, and wore a belt over their gown.

== Clothing of government officials ==
According to the Old Book of Tang, prior to the establishment of the Western Xia, Tangut people wore clothing in materials which was similar to those worn by the Steppe nomads, "Men and women wore coarse cloth (Chinese: 褐; pinyin: he) and draped felt [about their shoulders]". The clothing of the steppe that were used by the Khitan, Jurchen, Tanguts and the Mongols were made of felt, leather, and furs; materials which would be suitable for the climate of the steppe and provide protection against the low temperatures and high winds.

Emperor Jingzong, the first emperor of Western Xia, rejected Han Chinese silk clothing over the leather-based and wool clothing of the nomadic people from the Steppe; he argued that the Tanguts had traditionally worn leather-based and wool clothing and since the Tanguts men were military, they also had no use of silk materials. According to the Song History,

[Li Yuanhao] repeatedly remonstrated against his parents' willing servitude to the Song. Once his father admonished him for that, saying: "I have long led armies, but now I am tired. Our clan for thirty years has been clothed in brocades and fine silks. That is the favor bestowed by the Song; we must not be ungrateful for it." Yuanhao responded; "To dress in skins and furs and to tend one's flocks and herds are more natural to the Tangut nature. A bold leader's life should be that of the kings and conquerors; what does that have to do with brocades and fine silks?"

Emperor Jingzong also mandated Tangut clothing. Yet, silk clothing was still worn in Western Xia during his reign. Under his rule, men were also ordered to shave their hair on the tops of their heads but leave fringe across the forehead and down the sides. This order took place in 1034, and all men had to shave under the threat of death penalty; crowds were permitted to kill any men who disobeyed the order within 3 days.

Under the reign of Jingzong, clothing of officials were regulated and there was distinction between Han-style clothing and Tangut style clothing; according to the Song History, the Tangut-style clothing was labelled as "foreign" (Chinese: 番; pinyin: fan). The Han-style clothing was worn by officials whereas the Tangut-style clothing was worn by the military. Civil officials wore futou, boots, purple or crimson gown. Envoys of Western Xia were always dressed in narrow gown and wore golden diexie, leather boots, and golden hats. However, in 1061 AD, Emperor Yizong, the son of Emperor Jingzong, decided to replace Tangut clothing with Han Chinese clothing in his court. In his wish list to the Song dynasty court, Emperor Yizong asked permission to use Han Chinese rites and clothing to greet Song dynasty envoys and seek permission to buy Chinese official clothing; both of these requests were granted.

== Clothing of servants ==
Servants wore round-collared, narrowed-sleeved gowns of various colours which was decorated with roundels and fastened their gown with a waistband.

== Clothing of women ==
The women in Western Xia wore skirts and embroidered narrow-sleeved, cross-collared gowns which tend to be made of coarse cloth, fine wool, and animal hides.

== Gallery ==
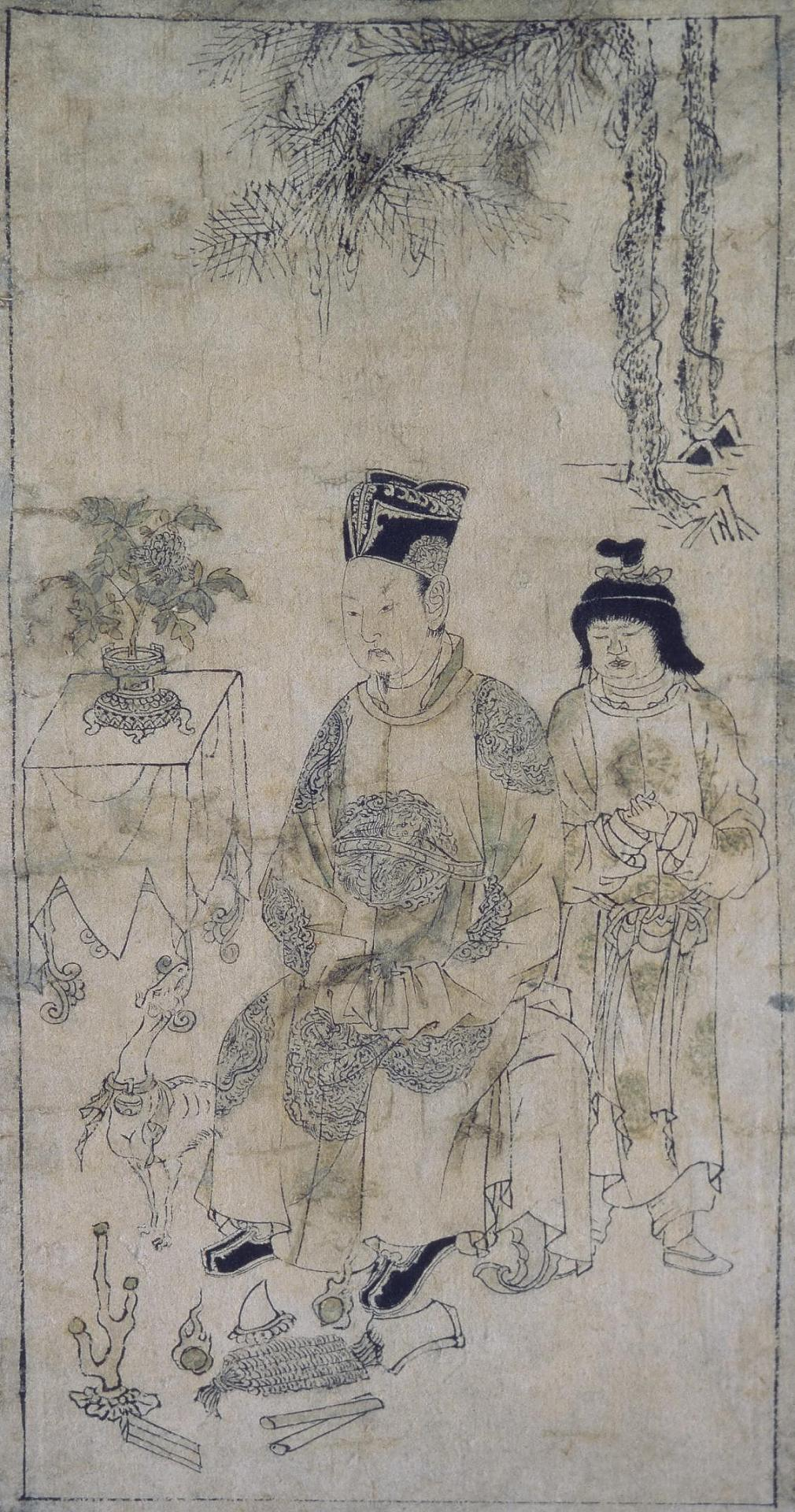
Tangut Emperor and a boy, a Western Xia Painting, 13th century.

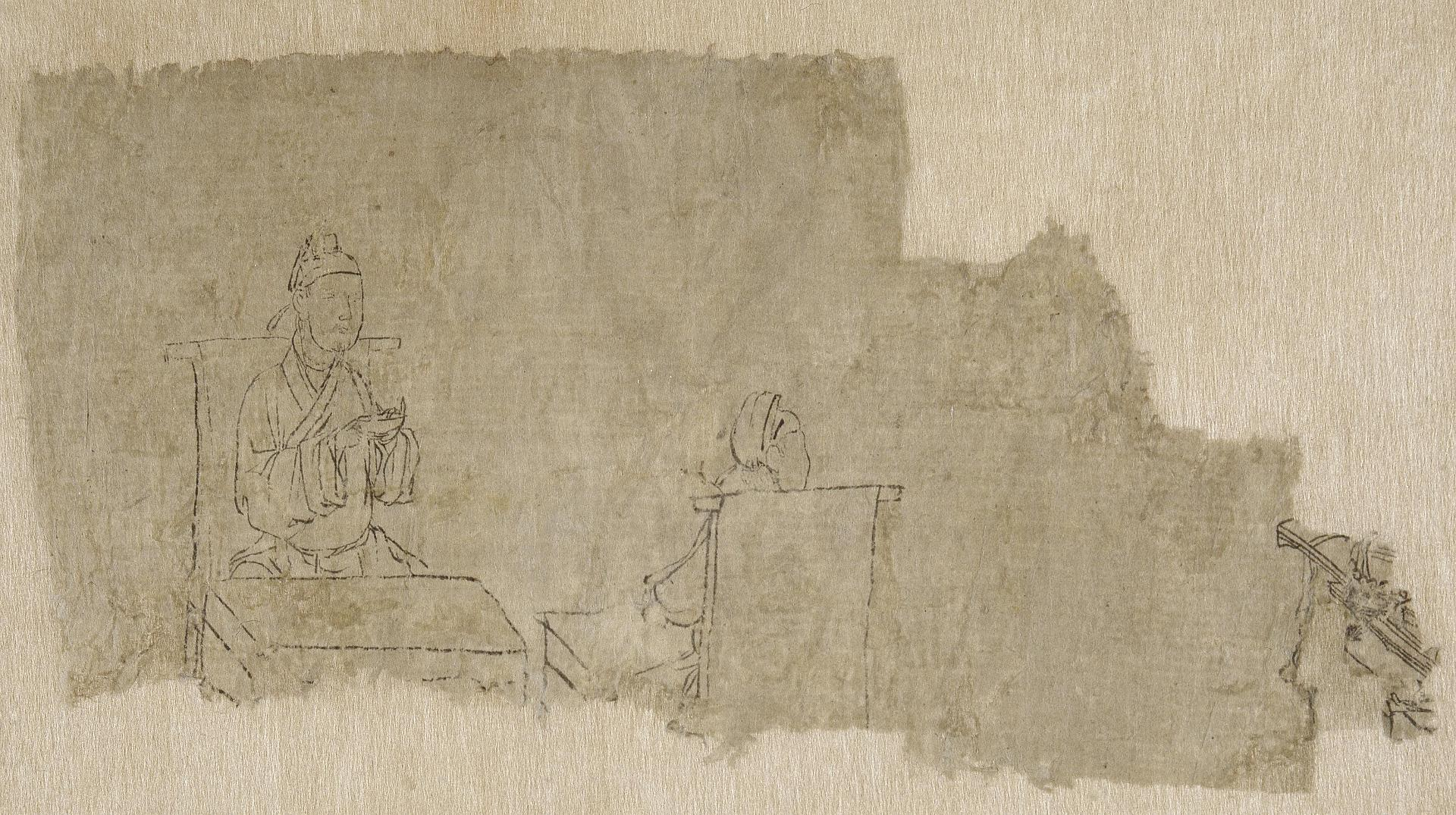
Sitting figures, Western Xia painting, 13th century.

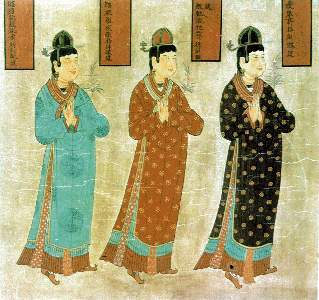
Mural depicting women wearing a cross-collared gown and skirts; Western Xia.

Mural depicting men; Western Xia.

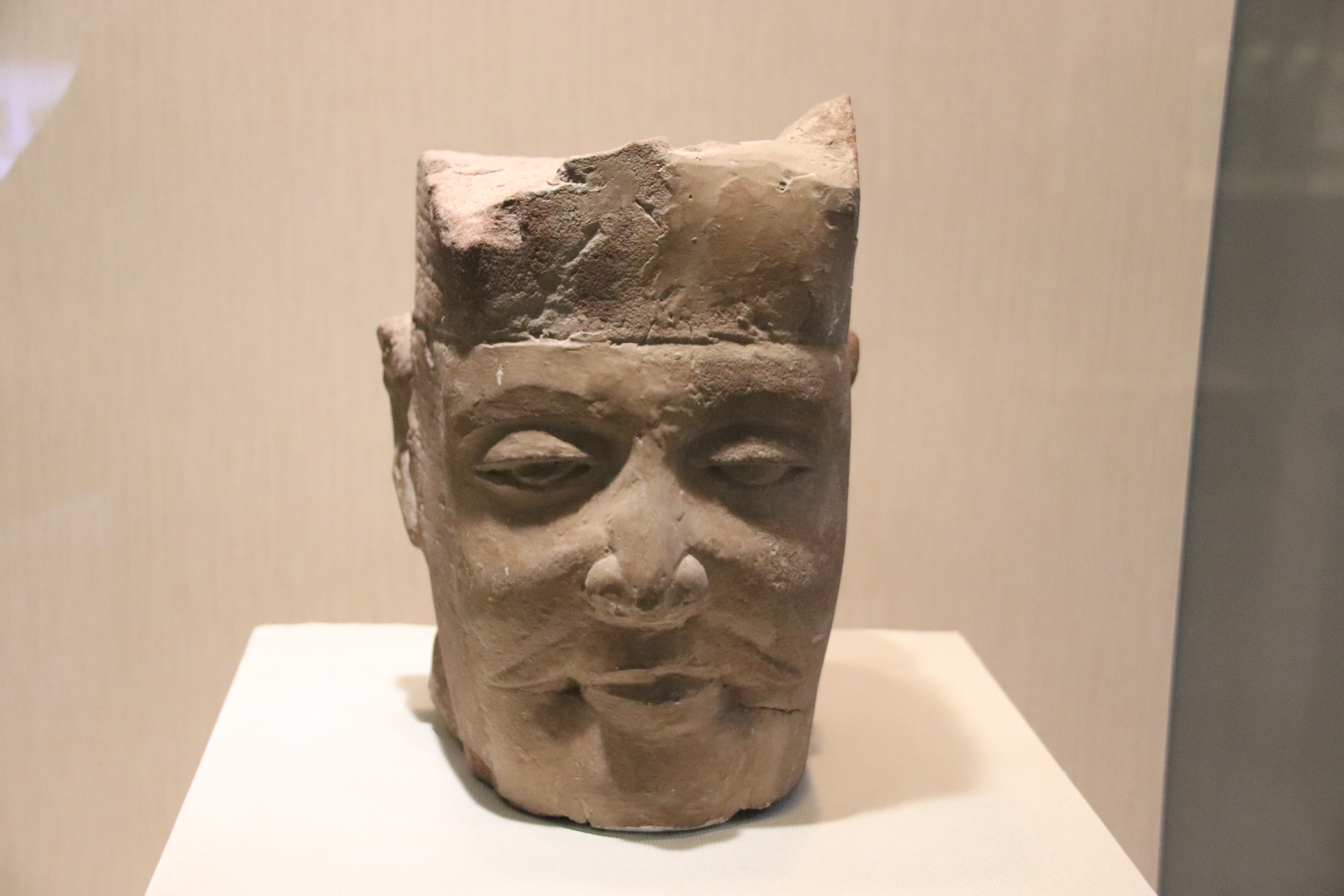
Face of Western Xia official

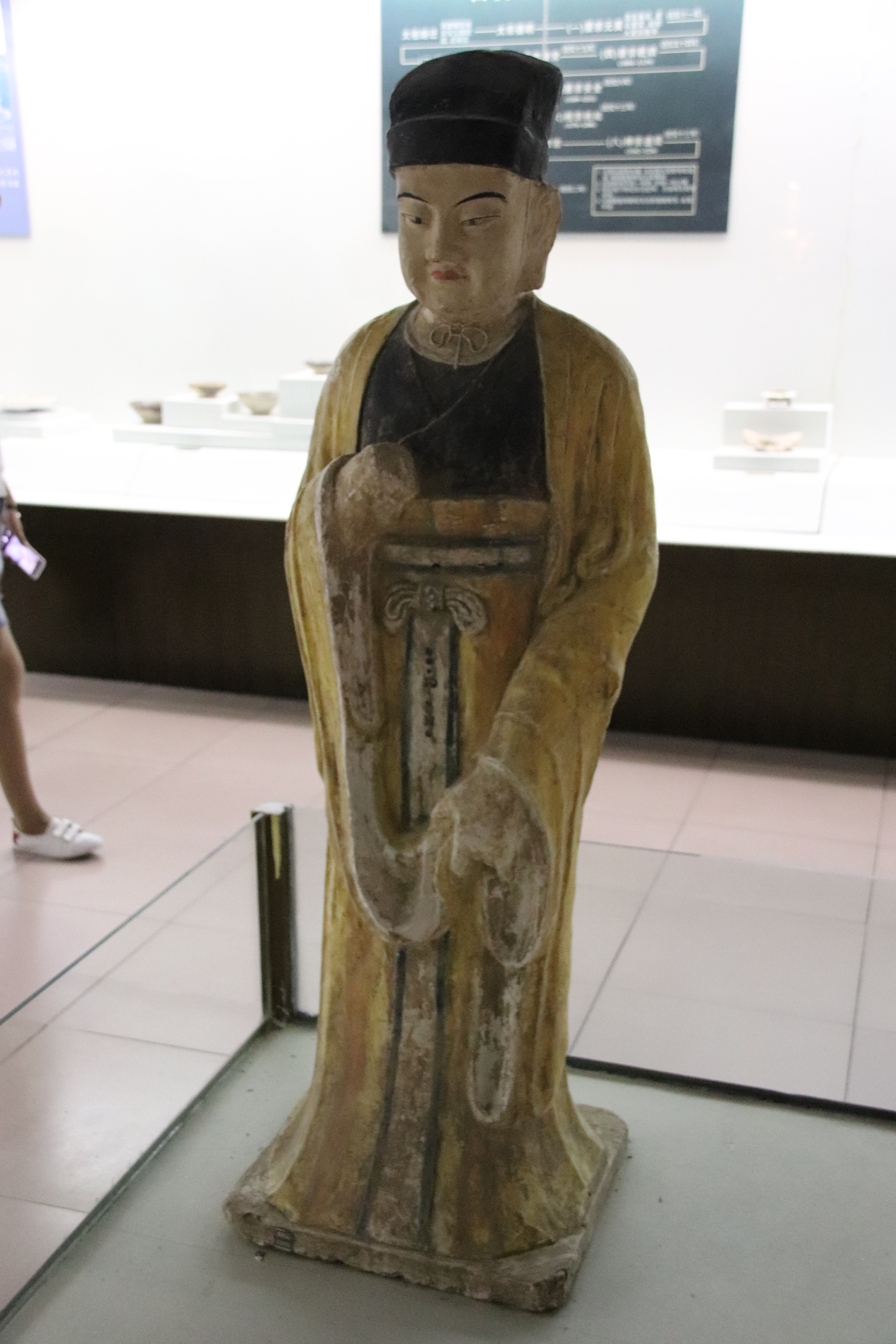
Western Xia official

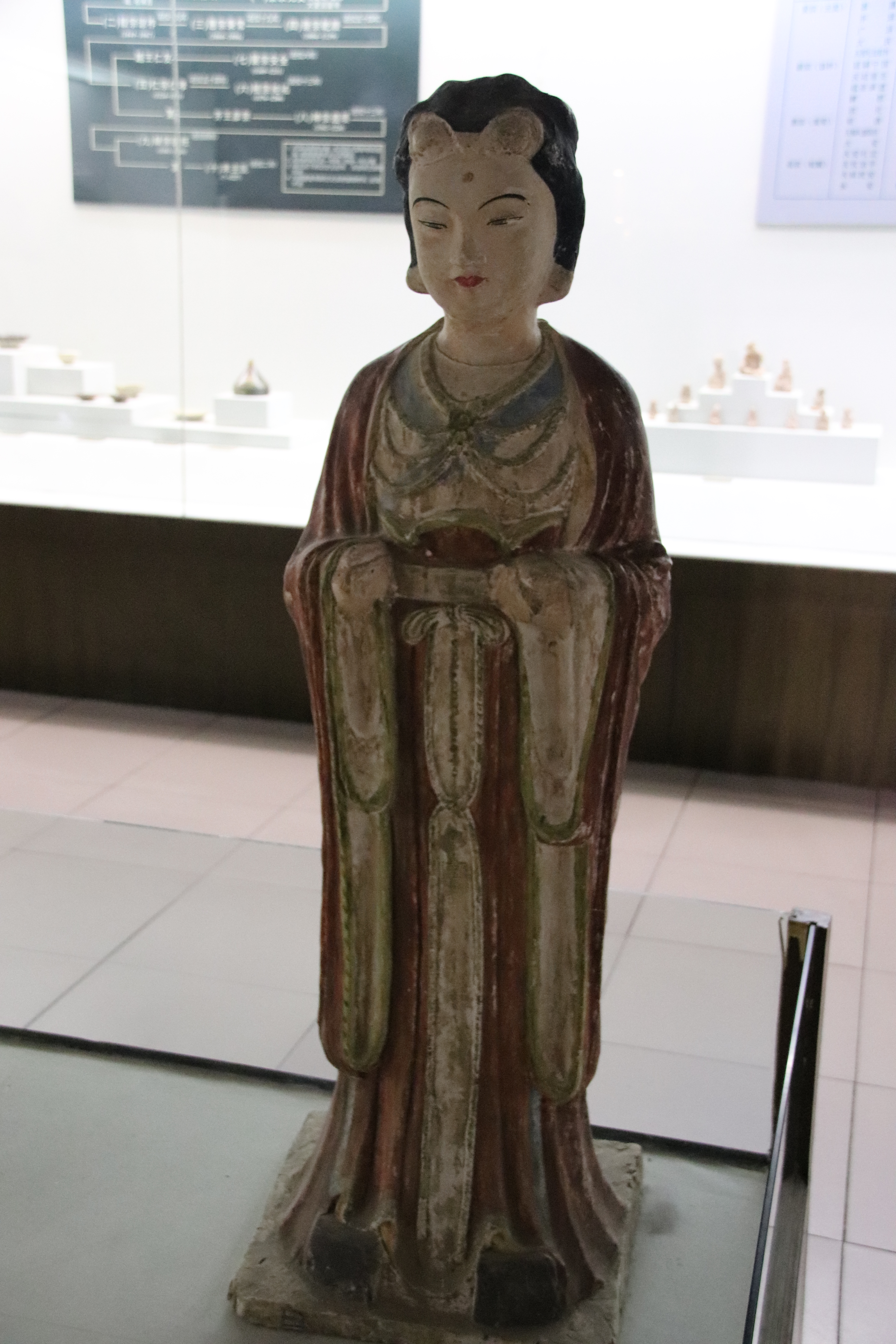
Western Xia woman

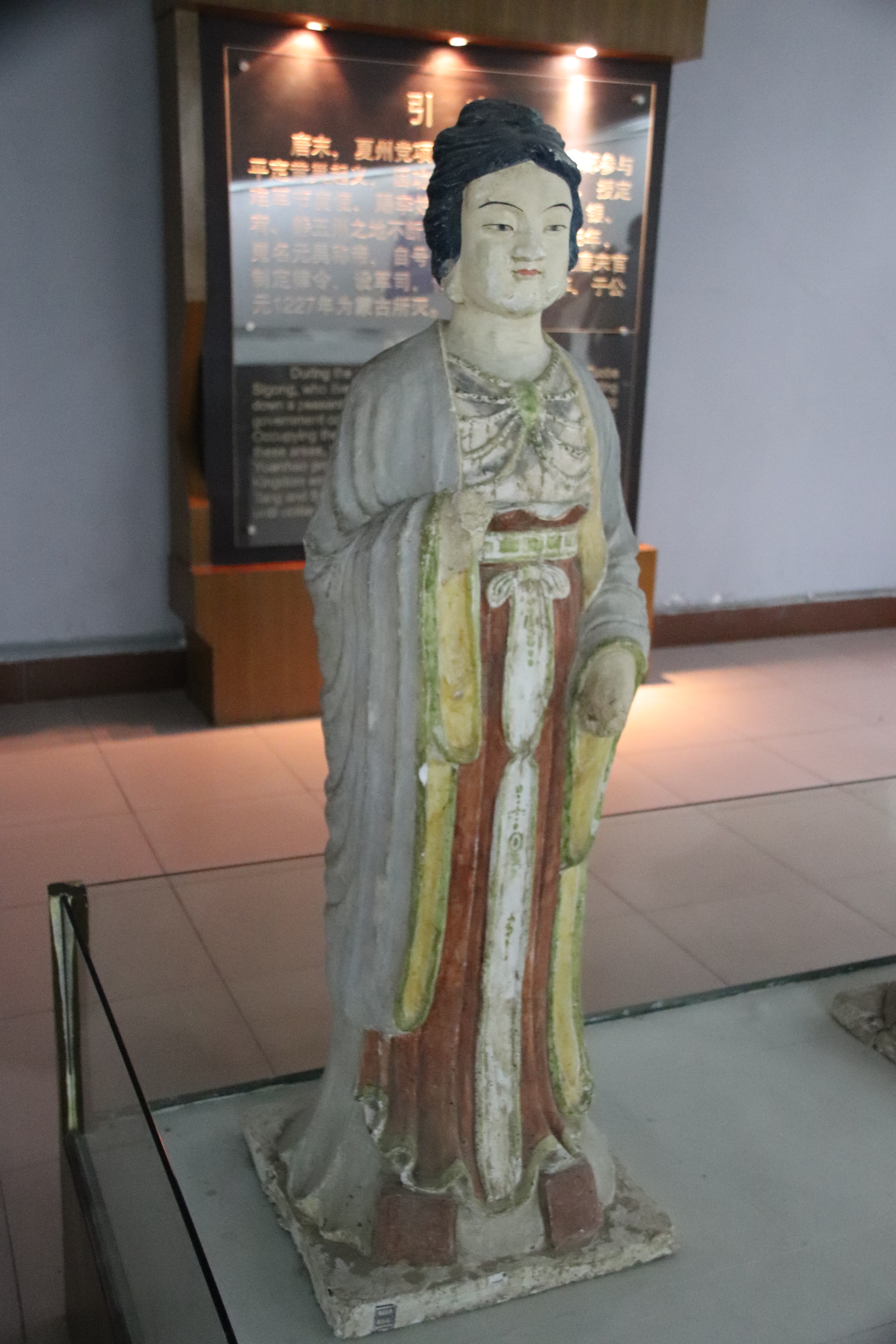
Western Xia woman

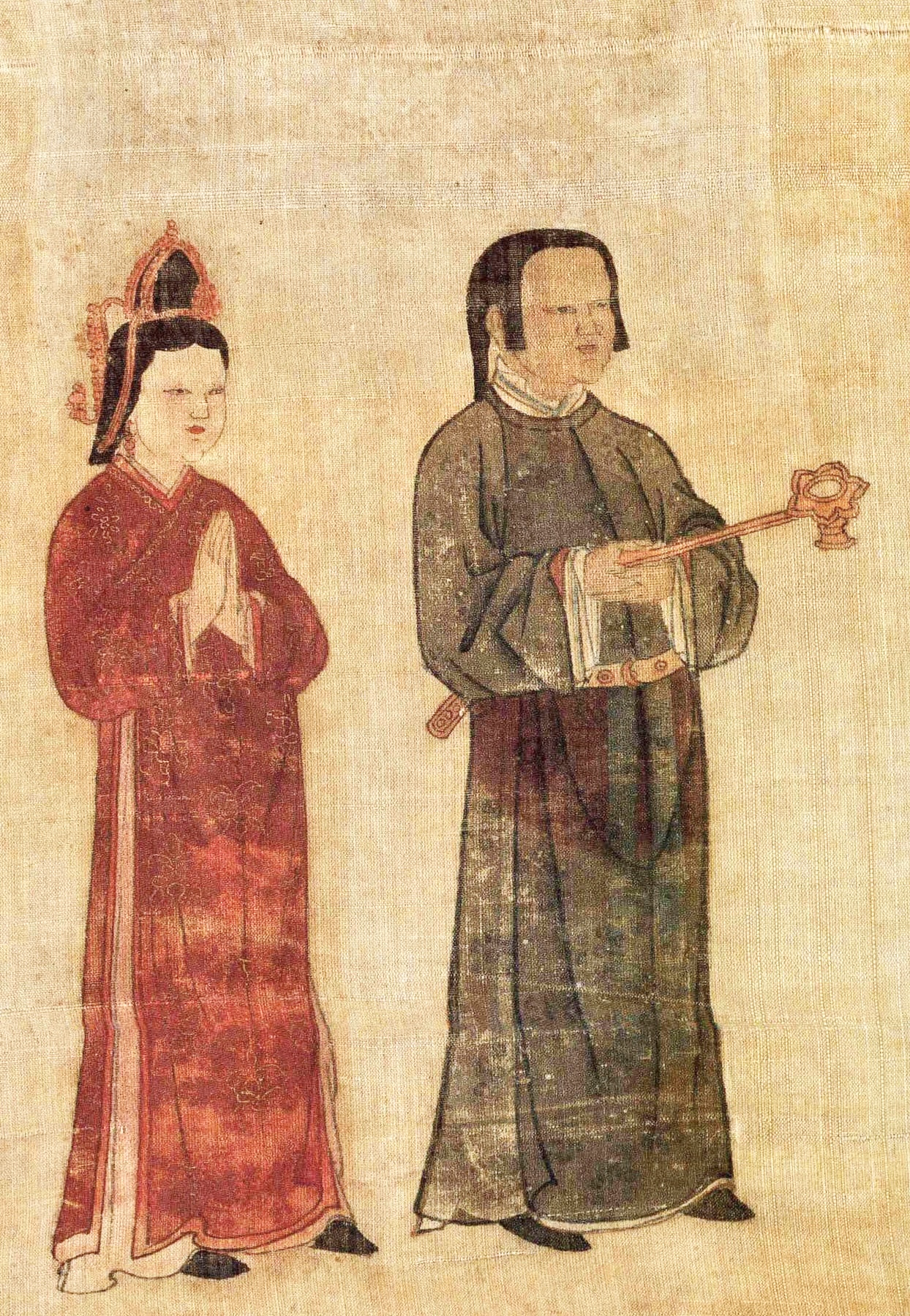
Tangut servants

== See also ==
- Hanfu
- Western Xia
