= Fashion in the Jurchen Jin dynasty =

Fashion in the Jin dynasty (1115–1234)

After the Jin dynasty (1115–1234 AD) was founded, the Jin dynasty rulers imitated the Song dynasty and decided to establish their own carriages and apparel system.

== Terminology ==
During the Five dynasties period, the Mohe people started to be referred as the Jurchen people (Chinese: 女真; pinyin: Nǚzhēn), they were referred as such by the Khitans who had founded the Liao dynasty. The Liao dynasty eventually subdued the Heishui Mohe who lived along the Heilongjiang river, the Songhua river, and in the Changbai mountains. The Jurchens, therefore, emerged from the Mohe tribes who lived south and west of the Changbai mountains and north to the Bohai kingdom.

The Jurchen were classified into two categories based on their lifestyles; they were either sheng (Chinese: 生; lit. 'raw') or shou (Chinese: 熟; pinyin: shú; lit. 'cooked'). Being influenced by Chinese culture was perceived as "cooking" while non-Chinese "barbarians" were considered as being "raw". The sheng Jurchen lived a relatively primitive and indigenous lifestyle based on hunting and herding similarly to the lifestyle of their ancestors. By the 10th century, the sheng Jurchen were subdivided into two categories based on their geographical location: those living in the north and took their identity from the Heilongjiang river and were called the "Black Jurchens" while those in the south took their identity from the Changbai mountains were called the "White Jurchens"; the white Jurchens considered themselves as being more "civilized" and being kin people of the Bohai kingdom. Some remnants of the Bohai people became the subjects of the Jin after it overthrew the Liao dynasty; and by the mid-Jin dynasty, the Bohai people lost their distinct identity having been assimilated. By the 13th century, the Jurchens of Jin considered the sheng Jurchens as outsiders, barbarians, and sometimes even as their enemies.

== History ==
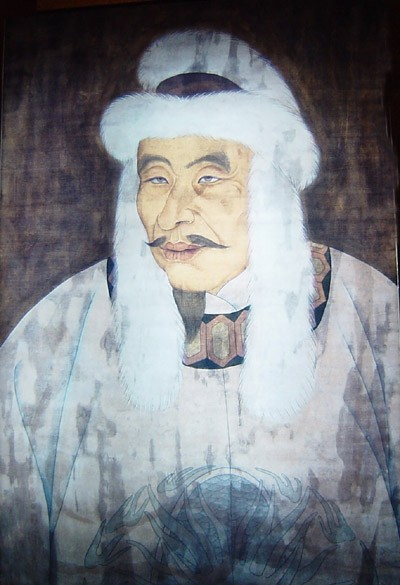
Jurchen clothing worn by Wanyan Aguda, dated 1123 AD (during Aguda's reign)

The Jurchen founded the Jin dynasty in 1115 by Wanyan Aguda by overthrowing the Liao dynasty. Soon after having founded the Jin dynasty, the Jurchen elites abandoned their sheng ways of life having been first influenced by Bohai and later on by gaining much of northern China and the former Song dynasty population which were large in numbers. The Jurchens who lived in the Jin dynasty quickly adopted Han Chinese culture, and by the late 12th century, Hanfu had become the standard form of clothing throughout the Jin society, in particular by the elites.

=== Attempt to ban Chinese clothing and progressive assimilation of the Jurchen ===
In 1125, the Jin dynasty destroyed the Liao dynasty, and in 1127, the Jin invaded Northern Song and sacked the capital city, Kaifeng. There was about 30 million Han Chinese living under the rule of the Jin dynasty. In the early period of the Jin dynasty, the Jin dynasty court first attempted to impose Jurchen hairstyle and clothes on the Han Chinese population in 1126 AD and in 1129 AD. The Han Chinese style clothing was prohibited and the people had to wear a short scarf and left-lapelled clothing; if they did not obey, they were put to death.

After having conquered northern China, in 1126, a proclamation was issued by the Grand Marshal's office stipulating that the Jurchens had conquered all and it would be therefore appropriate to unify the customs of the conquered people to make them conform to the Jurchen norms; therefore the Chinese men living in the conquered territories were ordered to shave their hair on the front of their head and to dress only in Jurchen-style attire under the threat of execution to display their submission to the Jurchens. This shaving hair order and adopting Jurchen clothing was however cancelled just a few months after it was stipulated as it was too difficult to enforce.

In 1127, the Jin dynasty occupied the Northern Song capital and the territories of the Northern Song; the Han Chinese who were living in Northern Song territories became the majority population of the Jin dynasty while the Jurchen became an ethnic minority in the Jin dynasty; this led the Jurchen to make political concessions allowing the Han Chinese to practice their own culture.

The shaving hair and adoption Jurchen clothing imposition order on the Chinese was once again reinforced in 1129; however, it does not seem to have been strictly been enforced.

In 1138 AD, the Jin court adopted the Chinese robes for the emperor and the officials.

=== Sinicization policy ===
In the 1150, Emperor Hailing established a sinicization policy. The shaving the hair and adopting Jurchen clothing order was taken back under the Emperor Hailing who was Pro-Chinese allowing the Han Chinese to wear their Han clothing by lifting the ban in 1150 AD. Under his reign, the Chinese in Honan were allowed to wear Chinese clothing.

=== Attempts to revive Jurchen culture ===
Between 1161 and 1189 AD, many Jurchens appear to have begun adopting Han Chinese behavior and forgetting their own traditions and languages; therefore, the Emperor Shizong of Jin prohibited the Jurchens from dressing like the Han Chinese in 1191 AD (which they had been doing for forty years) and from adopting Chinese family and personal names as he wanted to revitalize the old Jurchen culture. The Jin dynasty court had also banned intermarriage, but this ban was also lifted in 1191 AD. However, despite his efforts, the influence of the Han Chinese living in the Northern Song territories had a significant influence and by the mid-twelve century, the Jurchens were sinicized so much that they were almost indistinguishable from the Han Chinese in terms of dress, literacy and social customs.

==== Return to the Sheng Jurchen clothing-style ====
In the late 1160s, Emperor Shizong, the successor of Emperor Hailing, attempted to revive old Jurchen culture and to preserve the Jurchen's cultural identity. By his time, many Jurchens appeared to have adopted Chinese customs and have forgotten their own traditions. As a result, Emperor Shizong also prohibited the Jurchens from adopting Han Chinese attire.

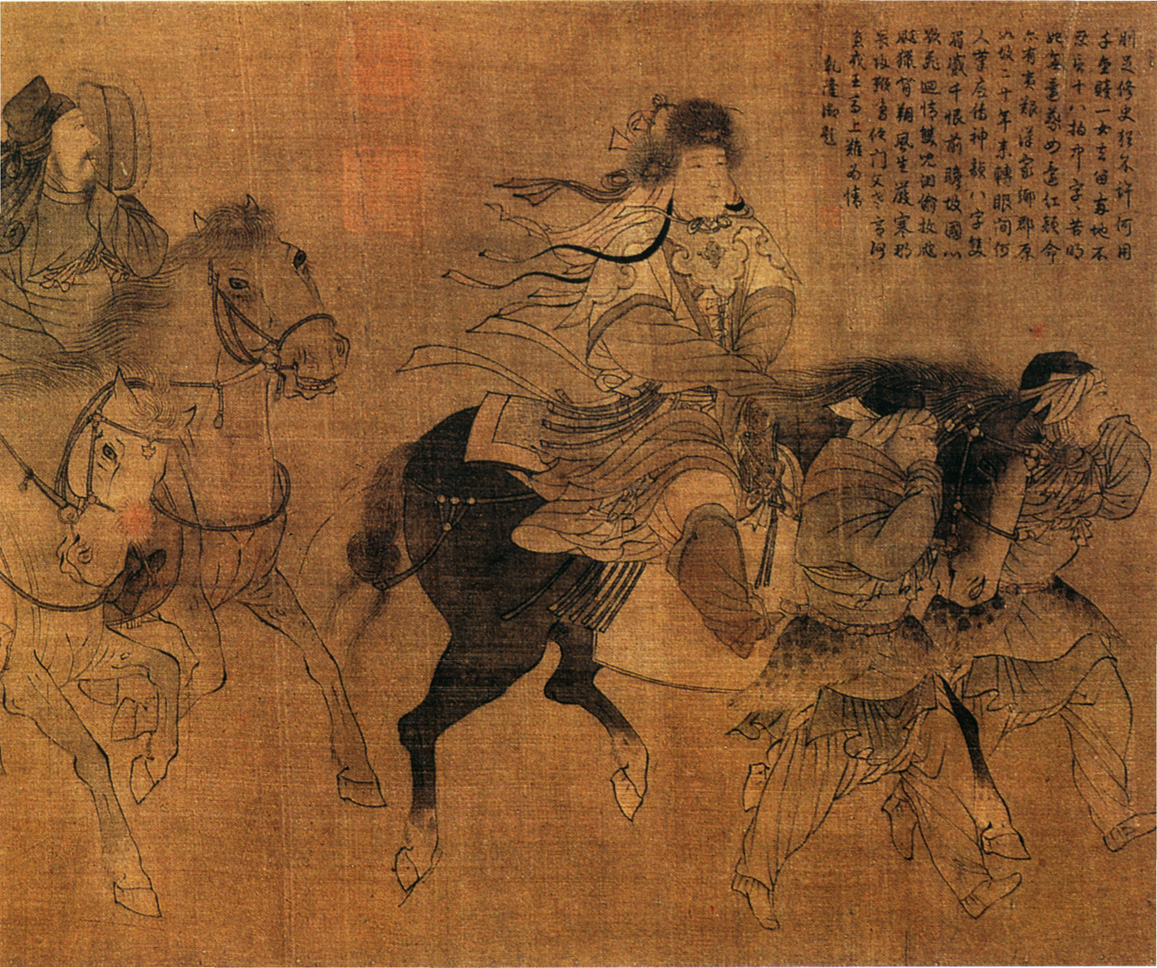
Cai Wenji depicted wearing Jurchen-style clothing, from the painting Cai Wenji returning to Han, Jin dynasty, c.1200

Jurchen material culture dating about 1162 were found from the coffin of the Prince of Qi, Wanyan Yan, and his wife, where Wanyan Yan and his wife were dressed in layers of clothing in the duplicate style as those worn by Lady Wenji and the warriors who accompanied her in the painting Cai Wenji returning to Han.The Prince of Qi wore earrings, drawers, padded leggings, jerkings, boots, a padded outer jacket with medallion designs at the back and front jacket; soft shoes and socks, and a small hat while his wife wore a short apron, trousers, leggings, a padded silk skirt, a robe with gold motifs, silk shoes with soft soles and turned-up toes. These forms of Jurchen clothing were in the styles of the old Jurchen nobility; a style which may have been typical of the clothing of the Jin imperial elite at some point in the late 12th century during the reign of Emperor Shizong, who emphasized the values of the old sheng Jurchen and attempted to revive Jurchen culture and values. The tribeswomen in the painting Cai Wenji returning to Han wear Jurchen attires consisting of leggings, skirts, aprons made of animal hide, jackets, scarves, hats made of fur or cloth; Wenji also wears Jurchen-style attire consisting of an ochre-yellow jacket, silver yunjian (a symbol of high rank), boots, and fur hat with ear flaps; the tribesmen wear typical sheng Jurchen clothing with the exception of a Han Chinese official. However, the Prince of Qi and his wife clothing were not made of rough-woven wool, felt, and animal-skin that the sheng Jurchen wore; instead, they wore clothing made of fine silks with some decorated with gold thread; they also did not wear boots.

According to Fan Chengda who visited the Jin dynasty in 1170 following the Jin conquest of the Northern Song dynasty, he noted that the Han Chinese men had adopted Jurchen clothing while the women dressing style were still similar to the Hanfu worn in the Southern Song dynasty (although the style was outdated).

=== Return of sinicization ===
After the death of Emperor Shizong, the policy of Jurchenization was abandoned and sinicization returned quickly. By 1191, the rulers of the Jin dynasty perceived their dynasties as being a legitimate Chinese dynasty which had preserved the traditions of the Tang and Northern Song dynasties.

== Characteristics of fashion ==
=== Jurchen ===
In the early history of the Jurchen, the Jurchen liked to wear white clothing and shaved the front of their head above the temples while the rest of their hair hanged down to their shoulders. They could also shave their hair at the back of the head and bundled it with coloured silk; they also wore golden locks as their ornaments. The wealthy Jurchen used pearls and golds as ornaments. Jurchen women braided their hair and wound them into a hair bun without wearing a hat. The Jurchen weaved hemp as they did not raise silkworms; they used the fineness of hemp cloth to indicate their wealth. In winter, fur coats were used by both the rich and the poor to keep themselves warm.

They also wore clothing which were suitable to their daily lifestyles (e.g. horse riding, hunting, and herding) and weather on the Steppe, especially those made of felt, leather, and furs. (Note: The use of clothing made of felt, leather, and furs were also used by the Khitans, the Tanguts, and Mongols. These clothing would protect its wearer from the low temperatures and high winds of the Steppe.) These forms of clothing continued to be worn after the Jurchen had founded the Jin dynasty. However, in the court, they would wear more luxurious materials, especially silk fabric woven with gold.

In general, the Jin dynasty Jurchen clothing were similar to those worn by the Khitans in Liao, except for their preference for white colour. Yuanlingpao with tight sleeves (closing to the left side, with pipa-shaped collar) were worn by men with leather boots and belts. Jurchen women liked to wear jackets (either dark red or dark purple) which closed to the left side with long flapped skirts. It is also recorded in the section Carriages and Costumes of the History of Jin dynasty that Jurchen clothing were decorated with bears, deer, mountains and forest patterns.

The Jurchen hairstyle was the Jurchen queue, called bianfa (辮髮). Unlike the tonsure of the Tangut Western Xia, the Jurchen hairstyle of wearing the queue combined with shaving the crown was not the invention of an emperor of the dynasty but was an established Jurchen hairstyle which showed who submitted to Jin rule. This Jurchen queue and shaving hairstyle was not enforced on the Han Chinese in the Jin after an initial attempt to do so which was a rebuke to Jurchen values.

=== Han Chinese ===
Based on Han Chinese tombs of the Jin dynasty, it appears that ordinary Jurchen clothing may have been a symbol of lower class status as servants and lower-class women tend to be portrayed as wearing modified Jurchen-style clothing whereas women from the upper class wear Han Chinese-style clothing. Yet despite the Han Chinese influence on Jurchens, travellers from the Southern Song dynasty who visited the former territories of the Song dynasty noted that there have been changes in the people's culture and that the Han Chinese's clothing style had also been influenced by the Jurchens in terms of adoption of items; they also noted that the only thing which had not changed much was the women's clothing style. However, the clothing-style of the Han Chinese women living the Jin dynasty was outdated compared to the Han Chinese women in the Southern Song territories. The yunjian was worn in the Jin dynasty and was adopted in the Yuan dynasty as a signature pattern on men's and women's clothing.

== Gallery ==
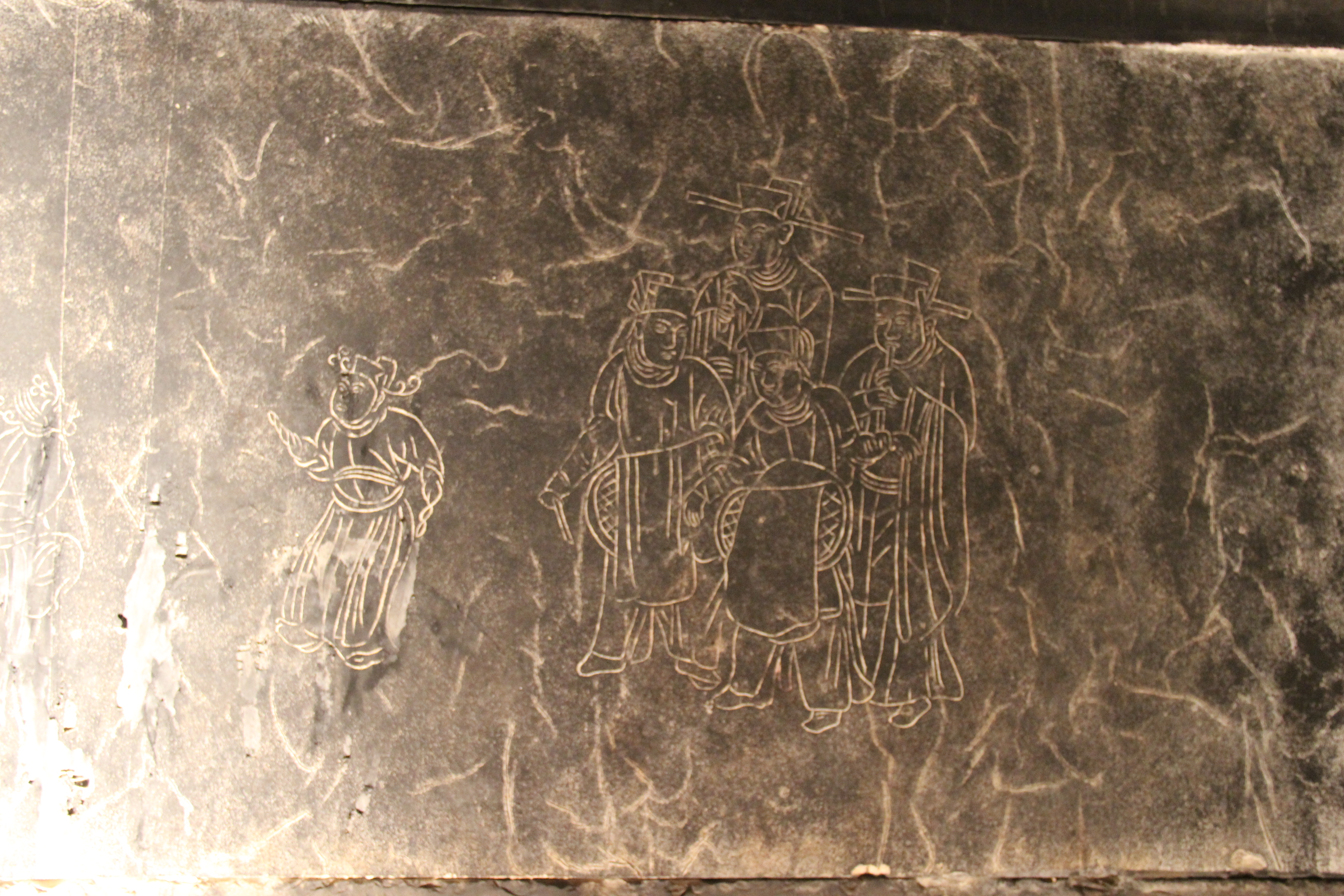
Jin dynasty tomb of Zou Fu, 1199 AD

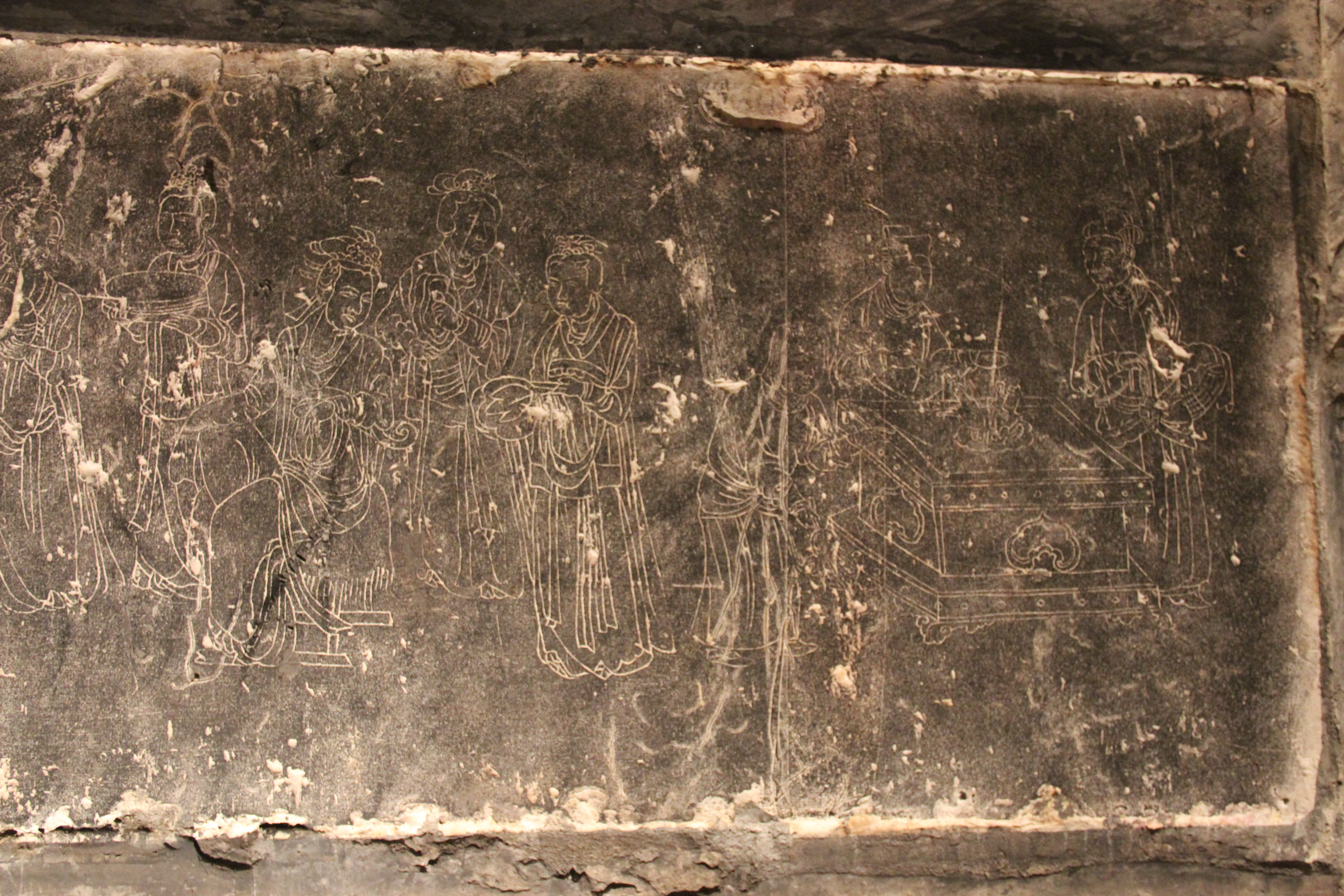
Jin dynasty tomb of Zou Fu, 1199 AD

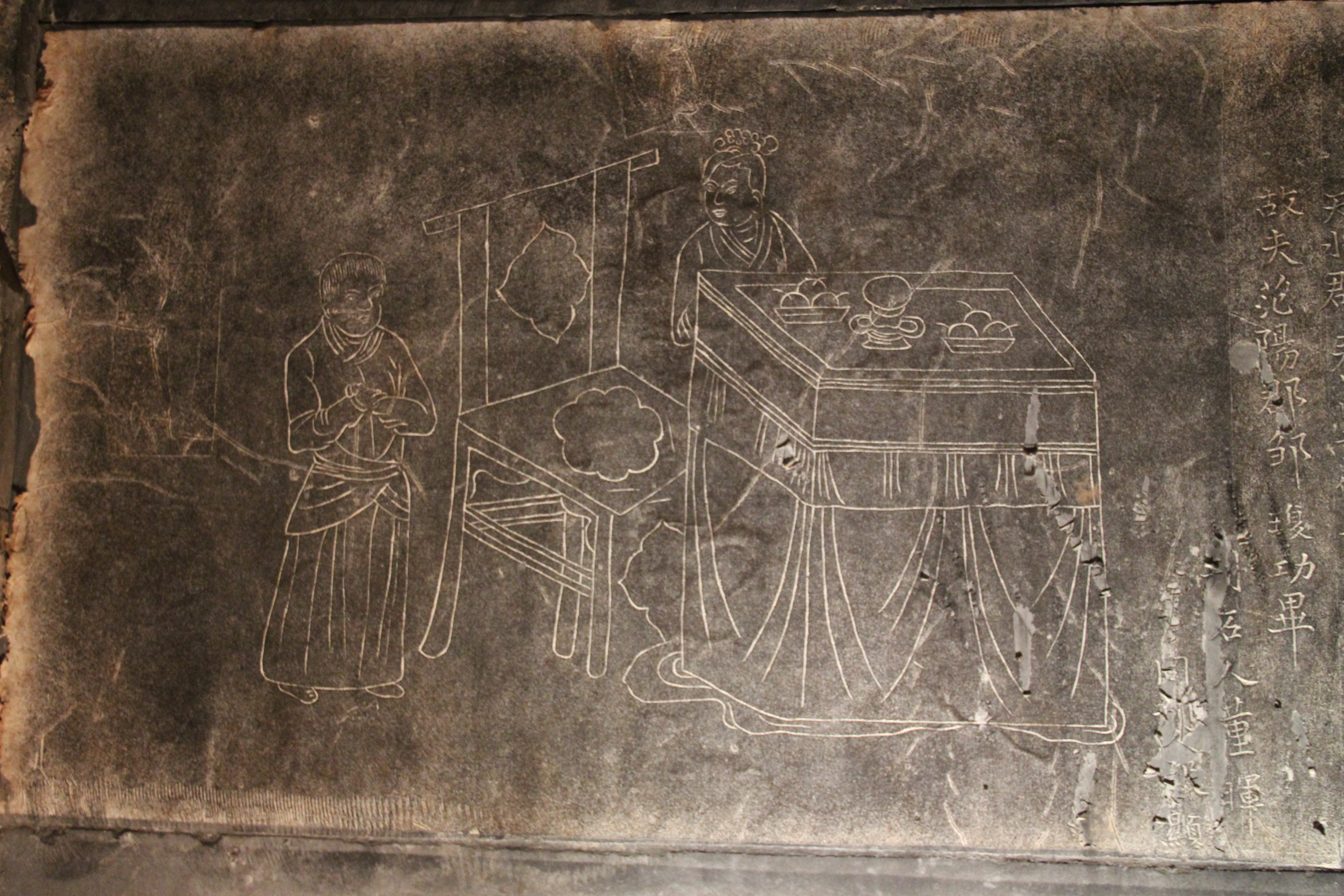
Jin dynasty tomb of Zou Fu, 1199 AD

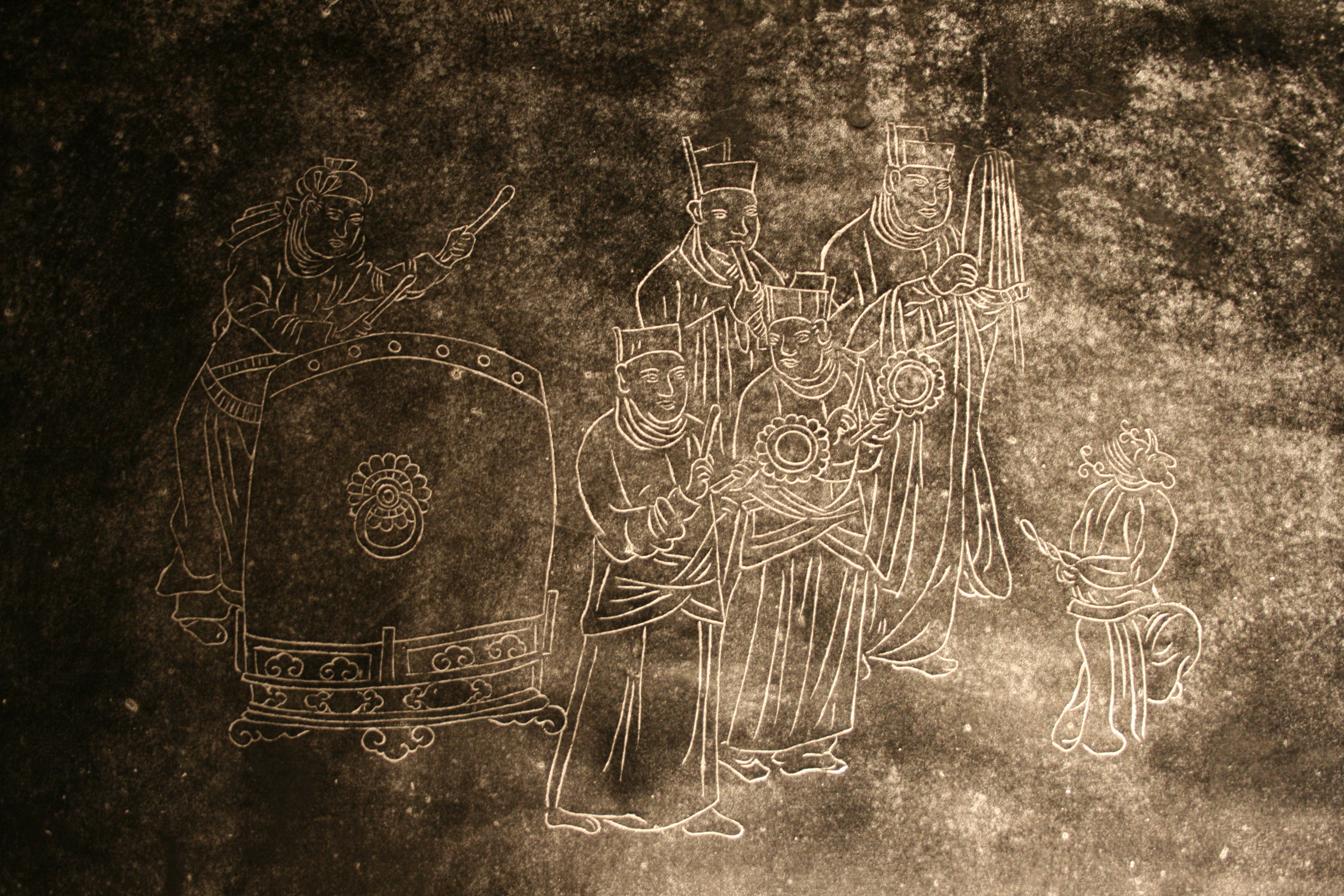
Jin dynasty tomb of Zou Fu, 1199 AD

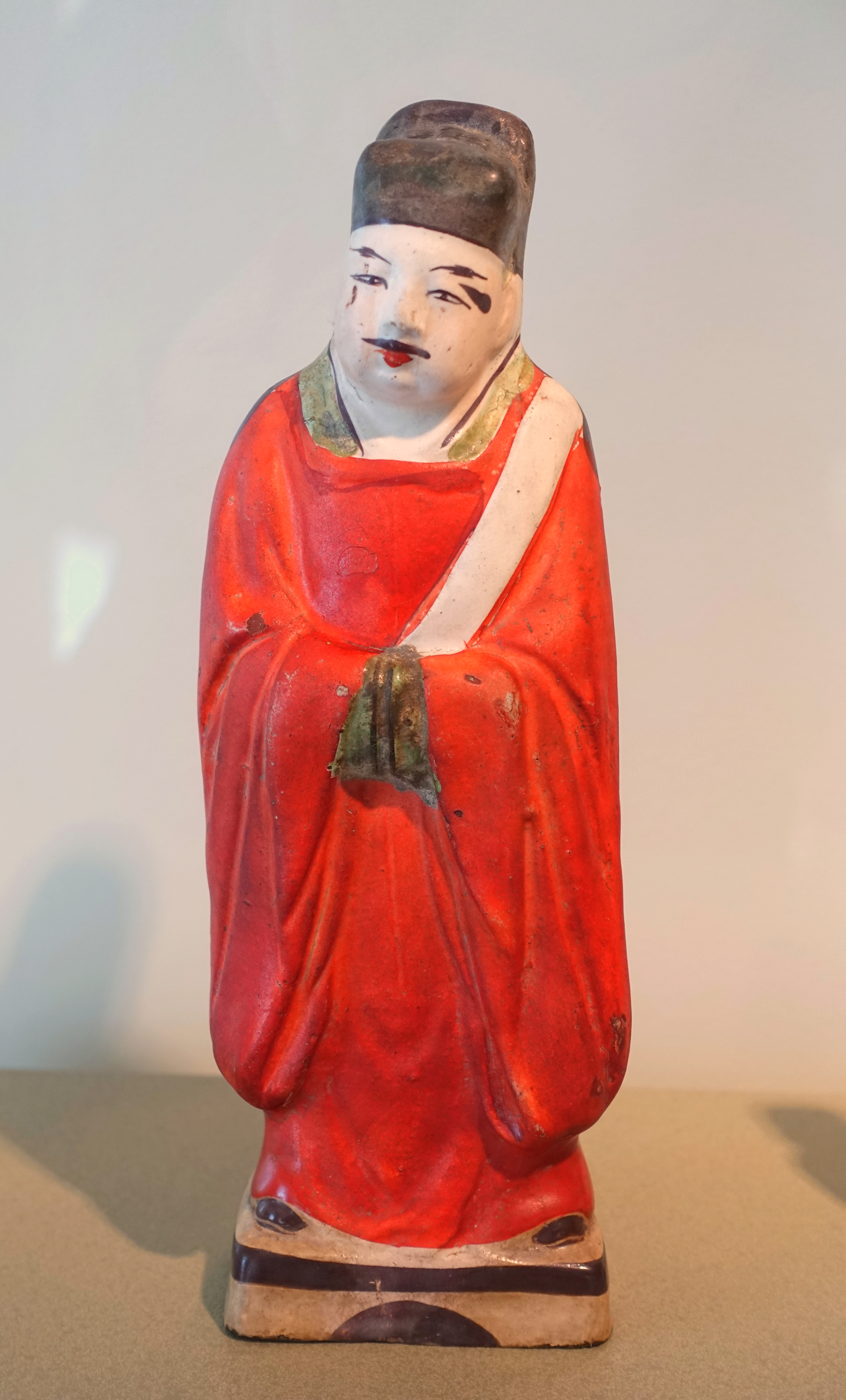
Standing official with tablet, China, possibly Handan, Hebei, Jin dynasty, early 1200s AD.

== Related clothing ==
- Hanfu
- Qizhuang

== See also ==
- Jin dynasty
- Fashion in the Liao dynasty
- Fashion in the Yuan dynasty
- Fashion in the Western Xia dynasty
