= Lady Mozang =

Lady Mozang (died 1056), posthumous name Empress Xuanmu Huiwen (Chinese: 宣穆惠文皇后), was a consort of Emperor Jingzong of Western Xia. She was regent of Western Xia during the minority of her son Emperor Yizong of Western Xia in 1048 from 1056.

== Life ==
=== Family background ===
Lady Mozang was born into a prominent Tangut Mozang clan.

Elder brother: Mozang Epang (没藏讹庞; d.1061), has served as great advisor (大师) since 1046

Paternal niece: Empress Mozang (皇后没藏氏; d.1061), daughter of Mozang Epang, empress of the Emperor Yizong of Western Xia

=== During the reign of Emperor Jingzong ===
It is not known when was Lady Mozang born nor when did she enter the imperial palace. Lady Mozang was known to be a gorgeous beauty and remarkable woman. Before entering the harem of Li Yuanhao, Lady Mozang had been a wife of Yeli Yuqi (野利遇乞), an elder brother of Empress Xiancheng. In 1047, Empress Xiancheng, lady Yeli, was demoted to a commoner and turned to nunnery due to her machinations. She had framed Lady Yeli for a romance with the official Buxiqi Duosi (补细乞多巳), using the hand of Yeli Yuqi, brother of Empress Xiancheng. This strengthened the relationship between Lady Mozang and Emperor Jingzong. On 5 March 1047, Empress Xuanmuhuiwen gave birth to Ningling Liangcha (宁令两岔) aka Liangzuo (谅祚).

=== During the reign of Emperor Yizong ===
After Li Yuanhao was killed by crown prince Ningling Ge, Li Liangzuo ascended to the throne. At that time Liangzuo was one year old, therefore the main power laid in the hands of Lady Mozang and her brother. As the mother of emperor, Lady Mozang received the title of empress dowager. Her brother, Epang, wielded an authority in the imperial court by the virtue of being an uncle of the emperor. The upbringing of the emperor laid in the hands of Lady Mozang and Epang.

=== Death ===
In 1056, the Empress Dowager went to the hunt in Helan Mountains together with her lover, Buxiqi Duosi. During the hunt, dying Lady Mozang was brought to the capital by the servants of Li Shougui (李守贵), her first love and subordinate of Yeli Yuqi. Unfortunately, Li Shougui was murdered together with Empress Dowager and Buxiqi Duosi on the way to the capital allegedly on Mozang Epang's order. She was posthumously honoured as Empress Xuanmuhuiwen (宣穆惠文皇后).

== In fiction and popular culture ==
- Portrayed by Li Jianqun (李建群) as Mozang Heiyun in Western Xia dynasty (Snow in the Helan Mountains).
- Portrayed by Wang Weilin (王维琳) as Mozang Heiyun in Oh My General
