= Mozang Epang =

Tangut statesman of Western Xia dynasty

Mozang Epang (Chinese: 沒藏訛龐, d. 1061) was an ethnic Tangut statesman and chancellor of the Western Xia dynasty of China during the reign of the Emperor Jingzong and Emperor Yizong.

== Life ==
=== Family background ===
Mozang Epang was a member of the Tangut prominent Mozang clan. Due to marriages of his female family members, Epang was closely related to the ruling Weiming (Li) clan.

Younger sister: Empress Xuanmu Huiwen (宣穆惠文皇后; d.1056) of the Mozang clan, wife of the Emperor Jingzong (Li Yuanhao).

Daughter: Empress Mozang, wife of the Emperor Yizong (Li Liangzuo).

=== Reign of the Emperor Jingzong ===
The exact date of birth of Mozang Epang is not known. Mozang Epang rose to power during the Tianshoulifayanzuo era (天授理法延祚). When Crown Prince Ning Ming died of illness, Mozang Epang presented the candidature of Prince Ningling Ge (寧令哥 or 寧林格, lit. "Grand Prince Ge") as the heir apparent. In 1046, Mozang Epang was bestowed the title of Great Advisor (大師), which was equivalent to that of Prime Minister. In 1047, Lady Yeli (Empress Xiancheng) was demoted to commoner status and turned to nunnery due to the machinations of Lady Mozang, who had framed Lady Yeli for having an affair with the official Buxiqi Duosi (补細乞多巳). This strengthened the relationship between Lady Mozang and Li Yuanhao (Emperor Jingzong). On 5 March 1047, Lady Mozang gave birth to Ningling Liangcha (Li Liangzuo).

In 1048, Yuanhao seduced his son's wife, Crown Princess Lady Moyi (沒移氏), and conferred upon her a title of Empress. Ningling Ge's mother (Lady Yeli) and Epang instructed Ningling Ge to kill the emperor so as to support his later ascension to the throne. On 19 January 1048, Ningling Ge broke into Yuanhao's chamber, taking advantage of his father's drunken state. The only action Ningling Ge managed to carry out was to cut off Yuanhao's nose. Fearing that he would be executed for his actions, Ningling Ge sought assistance from Epang. However, Epang betrayed his accomplice and turned him in as an assassin, leading to the execution of the crown prince. Yuanhao initially survived the assassination attempt, but eventually succumbed to his wounds.

=== Reign of the Emperor Yizong ===
After Ningling Ge had been executed Mozang Epang supported the ascension of his nephew, Li Liangzuo (Emperor Yizong), to the imperial throne. At the time, Liangzuo was only one year old and was therefore was raised by the Empress Dowager and Epang. Both Mozang siblings took the reins of power as regents for the underage emperor. Epang continued to wield immense authority in the Western Xia imperial court.

In October 1056, Lady Mozang and her lover Buxiqi Duosi were assassinated by Li Shougui (李守貴) while returning from hunting in the Helan Mountains. Mozang Epang subsequently ordered the execution of Li Shougui and his entire family, further consolidating his control over the Western Xia court. When Liangzuo reached the maturity, Epang forced his daughter to marry the teenage emperor in 1059 and was granted the title of Uncle of the State (國舅). In 1061, Epang and his daughter plotted to harm the emperor. When the attempt on Liangzuo's life failed, both Epang and Empress Dowager Mozang were executed on charges of treason and collusion with the Khitan-led Liao dynasty. Following their deaths, the Mozang clan was totally extermined.

== Legacy ==
Mozang Epang was known as an eminent official of the Western Xia dynasty. Although he was partially responsible for the deaths of members of the imperial clan, he endeavoured to bring prosperity to Western Xia. During the reigns of emperors Jingzong and Yizong, Western Xia was one of the most powerful states in the region.
