= Empress Xiancheng =

Empress Xiancheng (Chinese: 憲成皇后; 1005–1048), of the Yeli (野利) clan, was a Western Xia empress as the first empress of Emperor Jingzong.

== Life ==
=== Family background ===
Empress Xiancheng was a member of the prominent Yeli clan. Her brothers, Yeli Yuqi and Yeli Wangrong were eminent officials and generals of the reign of the Emperor Jingzong of Western Xia. Her distant relative, Yeli Renrong, devised Tangut script in 1036.

First elder brother: Yeli Wangrong (野利旺荣, d. 1042), served as a generalissimus during the Western Xia-Song war and held a title of Ningling (寧令, Tangut: 𘟙𘜶; lit. "Grand Prince").

Second elder brother: Yeli Yuqi (野利遇乞, d.1042), served as a general from 1038 to 1042 and held a title of Grand Prince of Tiandu (天都大王)

Sister-in-law: Empress Xuanmuhuiwen (宣穆惠文皇后沒藏氏, d.1056)

=== Reign of emperor Jingzong ===
It is not known when was lady Yeli born. Lady Yeli entered the harem of Li Yuanhao as early as in 1027. As early as in 1032, when Li Yuanhao ascended the throne, lady Yeli was appointed as his primary consort. In 1034, when Empress Dowager Huicidun'ai was poisoned by Yuanhao, lady Weimu, Yuanhao's consort, was under the house arrest. After consort Weimu had given birth to the son, lady Yeli claimed the child as inauspicious, which caused the death of lady Weimu and her child. Furthermore, the Weimu clan was annihilated shortly after the incident.

In 1038, when Li Yuanhao proclaimed himself an emperor, lady Yeli was instated as empress Xiancheng. Her first son, Ningming, was made an heir apparent. In 1042, Ningming was murdered for practicing Bigu (grain avoidance) with Taoist monk. Yeli Renrong, one of the distant relatives of Empress Yeli and the Prime Minister, died of reasons unknown. Her elder brother, Yeli Wangrong, was killed after the failed negotiations of peace with Song dynasty general Zhong Shifeng (the envoy of Western Xia was captured by the general and instructed to frame Yeli Wangrong for alliance with Song). Yeli Yuqi was implicated in the case, charged with treason and executed.

In 1045, she gave birth to Xili, who would die prematurely.

In 1047, she was demoted to a commoner due to machinations of lady Mozang, who had framed Lady Yeli for a romance with the official Buxiqi Duosi (补細乞多巳). Her daughter-in-law, lady Meiyi, was seduced by Yuanhao and appointed an empress, which deteriorated the relationship between Ningling Ge and Emperor Jingzong. Lady Yeli, members of Yeli clan and Great Advisor Mozang Epang encouraged the crown prince to assassinate the emperor. She died after the assassination of Li Yuanhao and her place of burial is not known.
