= Emperor Chongzong of Western Xia =

Emperor of Western Xia from 1086 to 1139

Emperor Chongzong of Western Xia 西夏崇宗

Emperor of the Western Xia dynasty
- Reign: 1086–1139
- Predecessor: Emperor Huizong
- Successor: Emperor Renzong
- Regent: Empress Dowager Liang the Junior (1086–1099); Liang Yibu (1086–1094)
- Born: 1083
- Died: 1139 (aged 55–56)
- Burial: Xiǎnlíng Mausoleum (顯陵, presumptively the No. 6 tomb of Western Xia mausoleums)
Names
- Weiming Qianshun (嵬名乾順); Li Qianshun (李乾順)
Era dates
- Tiānyízhìpíng (天儀治平, 𘓺𗫸𗁣𘇚): 1086–1089; Tiānyòumín'ān (天祐民安, 𘓺𗼕𘂀𗴴): 1090–1097; Yǒng'ān (永安, 𗦷𗪚): 1098–1100; Zhēnguān (貞觀, 𗣼𘝯): 1101–1113; Yōngníng (雍寧, 𗖠𗪚): 1114–1118; Yuándé (元德, 𗣼𗪟): 1119–1127; Zhèngdé (正德, 𗣼𘇚): 1127–1134; Dàdé (大德, 𘜶𗣼): 1135–1139
Regnal name
- Emperor Shengong Shenglu Jiaode Zhishu Renjing (神功勝禄習德治庶仁浄皇帝 = 𗾈𘉐𗟶𗠁𗣼𘞂𘂀𘇚𗸯𗑗𘓺𘋨); Emperor Renjing (仁淨皇帝, 𗸯𗑗𘓺𘋨); Tangut style: Emperor of the Bright Castle (𗭼𗍁𘓺𘋨); Emperor of the White Castle (𘙮𗍁𘓺𘋨)
Posthumous name
- Emperor Shengwen (聖文皇帝)
Temple name
- Chongzong (崇宗)
- Father: Emperor Huizong
- Mother: Empress Dowager Liang the Junior

Emperor Chongzong of Western Xia (1084–1139), born Li Qianshun (Chinese: 李乾順), was the fourth emperor of the Western Xia dynasty of China, ruling from 1086 to 1139. (Note: Reign dates are from uglychinese.org) His reign began at the age of three, when his father Li Bingchang died. He remained under the regency of the Empress Dowager Zhaojian (Note: There were two dowagers of Tangut emperors named Empress Liang, the other was over Emperor Huizong of Western Xia, see Ksenia Kepping, The famous Liangzhou bilingual stele.) until she was poisoned in 1099 by a Liao envoy.

Li's reign included further sinification and removed the power of some significant Tangut clans, which had remained a powerful political force—appointing tribal leaders as kings, forcing them under his power and influence. His reign saw incursions by the neighboring Liao and Northern Song dynasties, and a series of military defeats from 1114. He established Confucianist-led administration for several political quarters including civil and military, centralising his power. Buddhism was prevalent during his reign, and the scriptures were translated to the Tangut language.

== Family ==
Consorts and issue:

- Empress, of the Yelü clan (皇后耶律氏), personal name Nanxian (南仙), Princess Cheng'an (成安公主)
  - Li Ren'ai, Crown Prince (世子 李仁愛) (1108–1125), 1st son
- Empress, of the Ren clan (皇后任氏)
- Noble Consort, of the Cao clan (貴妃曹氏) 賢妃 to 貴妃
  - Li Renxiai, Emperor Renzong (西夏仁宗 李仁孝: 1124 – 16 October 1193), 2nd son
  - Li Renyou, Prince of Yue (越王 李仁友; d. 1190), 3rd son

== Notes ==
Regnal titles
Preceded by Emperor Huìzōng	Emperor of the Western Xia Dynasty; 1086–1139	Succeeded by Emperor Rénzōng
