= Emperor Huizong of Western Xia =

Emperor of Western Xia from 1067 to 1086

Emperor Huizong of Western Xia 西夏惠宗

Emperor of the Western Xia dynasty
- Reign: 1067–1086
- Predecessor: Emperor Yizong
- Successor: Emperor Chongzong
- Regent: Empress Dowager Liang (1067–1076); Liang Yimai (1076–1085); Liang Yibu (1085–1086)
- Born: 1060
- Died: 1086 (aged 25–26)
- Burial: Xiànlíng Mausoleum (獻陵, presumptively the No. 5 tomb of Western Xia mausoleums)
Names
- Weiming Bingchang (嵬名秉常); Li Bingchang (李秉常)
Era dates
- Qiandao (乾道): 1068; Tiancilishengguoqing (天賜禮盛國慶, 𘀗𗙀𗅲𗯿𗂧𗴴): 1069–1073; Da'an (大安, 𘜶𗵐): 1074–1084; Tian'anliding (天安禮定, 𘓺𗪚𗅲𗧯): 1085–1086
Regnal name
- Emperor Jiude Zhuguo Zengfu Zhengmin Daming (就德主國增福正民大明皇帝); Emperor Gongde Zhuguo Zengfu Zhengmin Daming (功德主國增福正民大明皇帝); Emperor Mingsheng (明盛皇帝, 𗭼𘃸𘓺𘋨); Tangut style: Emperor of the Wall-gazing Castle (𘅞𗹼𗍁𘓺𘋨)
Posthumous name
- Emperor Kangjing (康靖皇帝)
Temple name
- Huizong (惠宗)
- Father: Emperor Yizong
- Mother: Empress Dowager Liang

Emperor Huizong of Western Xia (1060–1086), born Li Bingchang (Chinese: 李秉常), was the third emperor of the Tangut-led Chinese Western Xia dynasty, ruling from 1067 to 1086.

After his father's sudden death, Huizong assumed the throne at the young age of six. His mother, Empress Dowager Liang (梁太后, Tangut: 𗃛𘞽𘓺𗨺𘜹), became the regent for the rest of Huizong's reign. In 1076, Huizong turned sixteen, and was supposed to assume direct control of the throne but was stopped by the enormous influence of the Dowager. The two sparred over the cultural policy of the empire: the Emperor Huizong supported sinicization, while the Empress Dowager Liang supported Tangutization (ironic, considering Huizong was of paternal Tangut heritage, and Liang was of ethnic Han heritage). Empress Dowager Liang eventually had Huizong put under house arrest; as a result, Huizong requested the Song dynasty for help. The Song Dynasty then invaded the Western Xia on the premise of freeing Huizong, but the invasion was repelled.

Empress Dowager Liang then forced Huizong to marry her niece, who would also become a powerful empress dowager. Thus, the Western Xia had two different Empress Dowager Liang.

He was depressed by the control of his mother, and Huizong later died at the young age of 26.

Huizong was succeeded by his son, the Emperor Chongzong.

== Family ==
Consorts and issues:

- Empress Zhaojian, of the Liang clan (昭簡皇后梁氏, d.1099)
  - Li Qianshun, Emperor Chongzong (西夏崇宗 李乾順; 1084 – 1139), 1st son
  - Prince of Jin Chage (晉王差哥), 2nd son
