= Emperor Jingzong of Western Xia =

Emperor of Western Xia from 1038 to 1048

Emperor Jingzong of Western Xia 西夏景宗

Emperor of the Western Xia dynasty
- Reign: 10 November 1038 – 19 January 1048
- Successor: Emperor Yizong

Duke of Xia
- Reign: 1032 – 10 November 1038
- Predecessor: Li Deming
- Successor: Proclaimed the emperor
- Born: Weimai (嵬埋); 7 June 1003
- Died: 19 January 1048 (aged 44)
- Burial: Tailing Mausoleum (泰陵, presumptively the No. 3 tomb of Western Xia mausoleums)
- Spouse: Empress Yeli; Empress Xuanmu Huiwen
Names
- Lǐ Yuánhào (李元昊), Zhào Yuánhào (趙元昊), later Wéimíng Nǎngxiāo (嵬名曩霄); Tangut name: Weimai (嵬埋)
Era dates
- Xiandao (顯道): 1032－1034; Kaiyun (開運): 1034; Guangyun (廣運): 1034－1036; Daqing (大慶): 1036－1038; Tianshoulifayanzuo (天授禮法延祚): 1038－1048
Regnal name
- Emperor Shengwen Yingwu Chongren Zhixiao (聖文英武崇仁至孝皇帝); Emperor Shiwen Shengwu Xingfa Jianli Zhuxiao (始文盛武興法建禮主孝皇帝); Tangut style: Emperor of the Wind Direction Castle (𘚶𗅡𗍁𘓺𘋨)
Posthumous name
- Emperor Wulie (武烈皇帝)
Temple name
- Jingzong (景宗)
- Father: Li Deming
- Mother: Lady Weimu (衛慕氏)

Emperor Jingzong of Western Xia (7 June 1003 – 19 January 1048), born Li Yuanhao (Chinese: 李元昊) or Tuoba Yuanhao (Chinese: 拓跋元昊), also known as Zhao Yuanhao (趙元昊), Weiming Yuanhao (嵬名元昊) and Weiming Nangxiao (嵬名曩霄), was the founding emperor of the Western Xia dynasty of China, reigning from 1038 to 1048. He was the eldest son of the Tangut ruler Li Deming.

== Early background ==
Yuanhao was born to Tuoba Weiming's consort, lady Weimu as "Weimai" (嵬埋 (Note: "Weimai" meaning "treasured and rich".)). After his father died in 1032, he became the leader of the Tangut. He was described as a talented army general and had always wanted to establish a country for the Tanguts.

== Military campaigns ==
Early in his leadership, Jingzong abolished the surname Zhao which had been given by the Song dynasty, replacing it with the surname Weiming (嵬名, Tangut: 𗼨𗆟).

He had also started a revolution, changing the lifestyles of the Tangut people. He ordered Tangut men to shave their heads or they would face public execution. He also ordered a change of clothing and writing.

With the help of Chinese traitors Zhang Yuan (張元) and Wu Hao (吳昊), Jingzong took an aggressive stance with the Song dynasty. At its height, he claimed an army of 500,000 men.

In 1034 Jingzong attacked the Huanqing territories (環慶路). He captured Song general Qi Zongju (齊宗矩).

At this point, he changed his target to the Kingdom of Qocho in the west, and his efforts against them began in 1036.

From the Uyghurs, he took large portions of Gansu, and the Tangut people would control the Hexi Corridor for 191 years before being conquered by the Yuan dynasty.

In 1038 he declared himself the emperor of the Western Xia dynasty whose capital was situated in Xingqing. Afterwards, he launched a campaign against the Song. Although the Tangut empire won a series of three large battles, the victories proved to be very costly and they found their forces depleted, due in part to a scorched earth policy by the Song. In 1044 the Western Xia dynasty signed a treaty with the Song dynasty resulting in the nominal acknowledgment of Song sovereignty by the Tangut and the payment of tribute by the Song.

== Culture and politics ==
The Emperor led to a reorganization of much of the Empire with the help of ethnic Han advisors. The empire created new departments and administrative services. The Emperor also knew Chinese and had Chinese works translated into his people's language. He accomplished this by supporting the development of a written language for the Tangut people.

However the Tangut script eventually went extinct after the Yuan conquest.

Nevertheless, Emperor Jingzong had strong opposition to the people imitating the Song dynasty too closely. He emphasized the value of their traditional nomadic way of life and discouraged any dependence on Song luxury items. Trade with the Song was minimized or cut off before the peace treaty that came four years before his death. Although Jingzong used talented Song workers, to retain his own power and dynasty, he did not want to be conquered by the Song dynasty.

Later on the Western Xia emperors would switch between multiple sides, Liao, Song, Jin, and the Mongols, in order to retain their power. Jingzong's attacks weakened the Jin and Song dynasties to the extent that the Mongols would later be able to conquer China. For vacillating between multiple sides, colluding with Mongols and Jurchen, and launching attacks against the Song.

However, the Mongols ultimately crushed the Western Xia dynasty, destroyed nearly any vestige of the empire, and ended Jingzong's reign in Ningxia. The Mongols would then reunify China under the Yuan dynasty.

== Succession and death ==
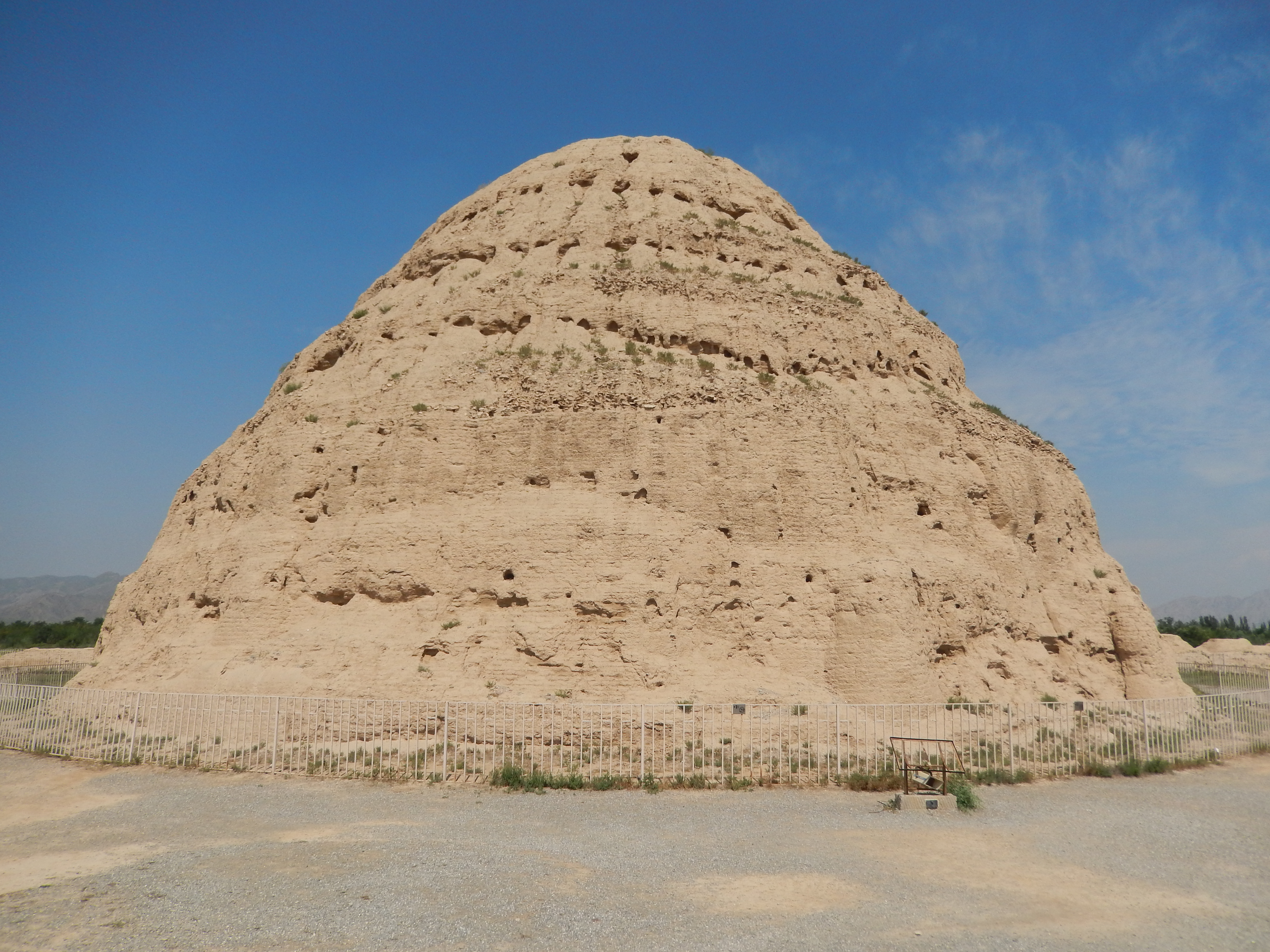
Mausoleum of Emperor Jingzong (Tailing 泰陵)

In 1048, both the Prime Minister, Mozang Epang (沒藏訛龐), and Prince Ningling Ge (寧令哥) conspired to assassinate Jingzong. Prince Ningling Ge attempted to kill Jingzong with a sword, but he only managed to slice off Jingzong's nose. Frightened by what he had done, Prince Ningling Ge fled to Mozang for backup, but Mozang betrayed Ningling Ge by turning him in as the assassin.

Although Jingzong initially survived the assassination, he succumbed to his wounds a few days later.

== Family ==
Consorts and Issue:

- Empress, of the Weimu clan (皇后卫慕氏)
  - First Son
- Empress Xiancheng, of the Yeli clan (憲成皇后野利氏; d. 1048)
  - Li Ningming, Crown Prince (太子 李寧明, d.1042), 3rd son
  - Li Ningling, Crown Prince (太子 李寧令, 1032 – 1048), 4th son
  - Li Xili (李錫狸), 5th son
- Empress, of the Muoyi clan (新皇后 沒移氏; d.1049)
- Empress Xuanmu Huiwen, of the Mozang clan (宣穆惠文皇后 沒藏氏, d.1056)
  - Li Liangzuo, Emperor Yizong (李諒祚 兩岔; 1047 – 1068), 6th son
- Princess Xingping, of the Khitan Yelü clan (興平公主耶律氏, d. 1038)
- Lady, of the Suo clan (索氏)
- Lady, of the Duola clan (多拉氏)
- Lady, of the Mikemote clan (密克默特氏)
- Lady, of the Miemi clan (咩迷氏)
  - Li Ali (李阿哩, d.1045), 2nd son
- Unknown:
1. Princess Li (李氏), 1st daughter
