= Empress Gongsu =

Empress Gongsu 恭肅皇后

Empress consort of the Western Xia dynasty
- Tenure: 1061–1067
- Predecessor: Empress Mozang
- Successor: Empress Zhaojian

Empress dowager of the Western Xia dynasty
- Tenure: 1068–1085
- Died: 1085
- Spouse: Emperor Yizong
- Issue: Emperor Huizong; Princess
Regnal name
- Empress Dowager Caijing (才浄皇太后, 𗥮𗑗𘓺𗨺𘜹)
Posthumous name
- Empress Gongsu Zhangxian (恭肅章憲皇后)

Empress Dowager Liang (Chinese: 梁太后; Tangut: 𗃛𘞽𘓺𗨺𘜹; d. 1085), posthumous name Empress Gongsu Zhangxian (恭肅章憲皇后), was the empress consort of the Emperor Yizong of Western Xia. She was a member of the Liang clan, but her personal name is not known. After the death of her husband, she was regent of Western Xia during the minority of her son Emperor Huizong of Western Xia in 1061–1067.
