= Emperor Yizong of Western Xia =

Emperor of Western Xia from 1048 to 1068

Emperor Yizong of Western Xia 西夏毅宗

Emperor of the Western Xia dynasty
- Reign: 1048 – January 1068
- Predecessor: Emperor Jingzong
- Successor: Emperor Huizong
- Born: Liangcha (兩岔); 5 March 1047
- Died: January 1068 (aged 20)
- Burial: Anling Mausoleum (安陵, presumptively the No. 4 tomb of Western Xia mausoleums)
- Spouse: Empress Mozang; Empress Liang
Names
- Weiming Liangzuo (嵬名諒祚); Li Liangzuo (李諒祚); Tangut name: Liangcha (兩岔)
Era dates
- Yansiningguo (延嗣寧國): 1049; Tianyouchuisheng (天祐垂聖): 1050–1052; Fushengchengdao (福聖承道; Tangut: 𗼃𗼕 or 𗣼𗧯): 1053–1056; Duodu (奲都): 1057–1062; Gonghua (拱化): 1063–1067
Posthumous name
- Emperor Zhaoying (昭英皇帝)
Temple name
- Yizong (毅宗)
- Father: Li Yuanhao
- Mother: Empress Xuanmu Huiwen

Emperor Yizong of Western Xia (1047–1068), sinicized name Li Liangzuo (Chinese: 李諒祚), was the second emperor of the Western Xia dynasty of China, reigning from 1048 to 1067. Yizong was also known by his Tangut name Ningling Liangcha (寧令兩岔). "Ningling" (寧令, Tangut: 𘟙𘜶) was his Tangut title, which meant "Grand Prince", while "Liangcha" (兩岔) was his personal name.

After the death of his father, Li Yuanhao (Emperor Jingzong) in 1048, Yizong assumed the throne at the age of one, but most of the power laid in the hands of his mother the Empress Dowager. In 1049, the Liao dynasty attacked the Western Xia and forced it to become a vassal state. In 1056, the Dowager was killed and Yizong's uncle, Mozang Epang, became the regent. In 1061, Yizong's uncle and cousin plotted against him, so he had them executed and assumed direct control of the Western Xia.

Yizong expanded the central government, adding many offices. He made the armies more efficient and improved his control over faraway states. Yizong began to attack the Northern Song dynasty and raided their villages. He also forced the Turpan leader to surrender. In later years, Yizong began to improve diplomatic relationships with the Northern Song and Liao dynasties. He died suddenly in 1068.

== Family ==
Consorts and issues:

- Empress, of the Mozang clan (皇后沒藏氏, d.1061), daughter of Mozang Epang
- Empress Gongsu, of the Liang clan (恭肅皇后梁氏, d.1085), personal name Luoyao (落瑤)
  - Li Bingchang, Emperor Huizong (西夏惠宗 李秉常; 1060 – 1086), 1st son
  - Princess Li (李氏), 1st daughter
    - Married son of Dong Zhan (董毡), Dong Tongbi (董通比)
