= Empress Zhaojian =

Empress Zhaojian 昭簡皇后

Empress consort of the Western Xia dynasty
- Tenure: 1083 – 1086
- Predecessor: Empress Gongsu
- Successor: Yelü Nanxian, Princess Cheng'an of Khitan

Empress dowager of the Western Xia dynasty
- Tenure: 1086 – 1099
- Died: 1099
- Spouse: Emperor Huizong
- Issue: Emperor Chongzong
Regnal name
- Empress Dowager Desheng (德盛皇太后, 𗣼𗯿𘓺𗨺𘜹); Empress Dowager Shengzhi Guanglu Zhimin Jili Desheng (勝智廣禄治民集禮德盛皇太后, 𘄡𗠁𗟶𗾟𗚉𘇚𗅲𗄭𗣼𗯿𘓺𗨺𘜹)
Posthumous name
- Empress Zhaojian Wenmu (昭簡文穆皇后)
- Father: Liang Yimai

Empress (Dowager) Liang the Junior (小梁太后, died 1099), posthumously titled Empress Zhaojian Wenmu (昭簡文穆皇后), was an empress consort of the Western Xia. She was a member of the Liang clan, but her personal name is not known. She was married to Emperor Huizong of Western Xia, and was regent from 1086 to 1099 during the minority of her son, Emperor Chongzong of Western Xia.

Chongzong ascended the throne when he was only a young child, and his mother the Empress Dowager steered the kingdom until her death. She was said to have rode at the front of the cavalry while campaigning against the Song dynasty.

== Bibliography ==
- Dunnell, Ruth W. (1996), The Great State of White and High: Buddhism and State Formation in Eleventh-Century Xia, University of Hawai‘i Press
