= Swords Castle =

Restored medieval castle near Dublin, Ireland

- Caisleán Shoird
- Bridge Street, Swords, County Dublin
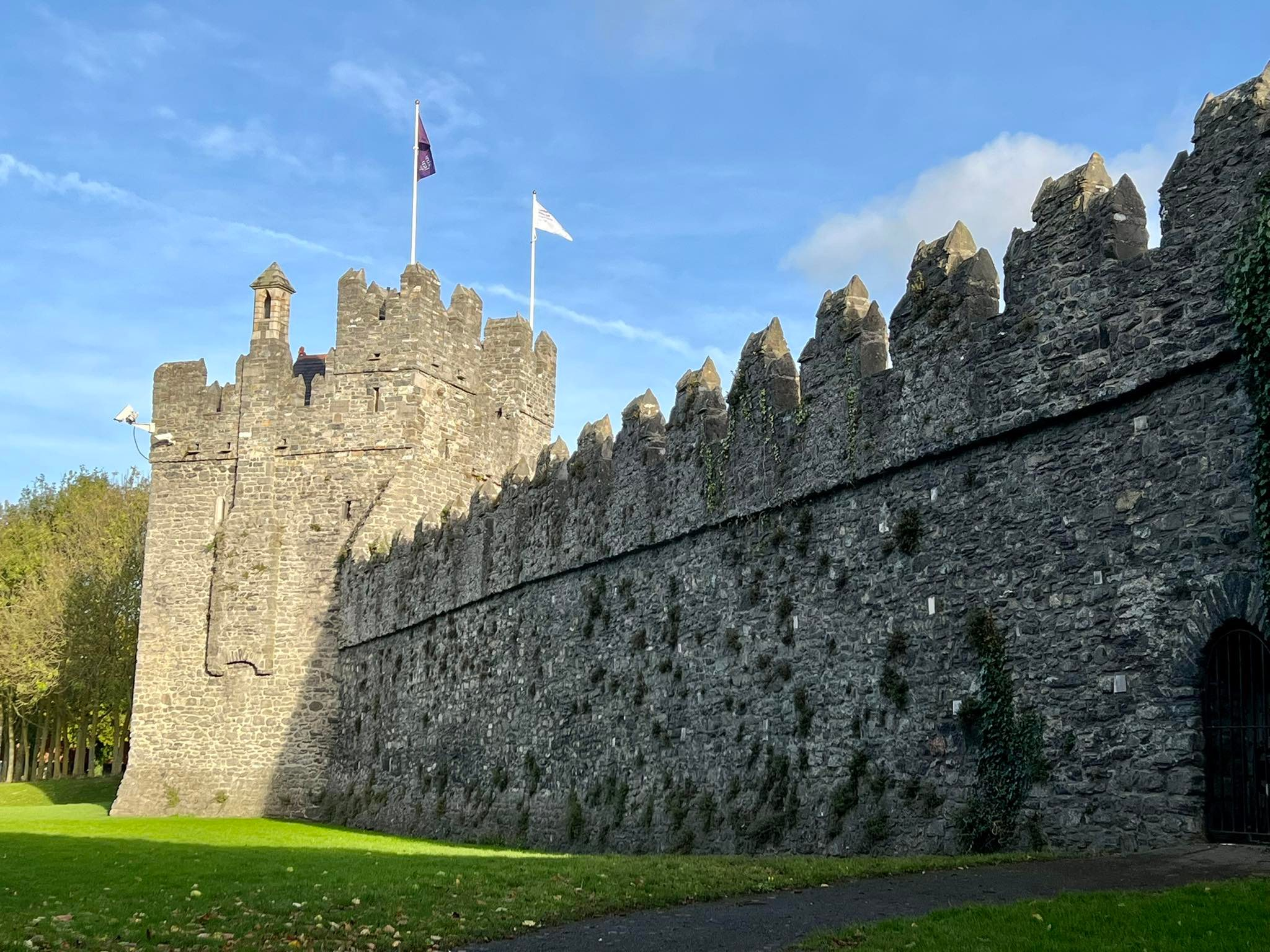
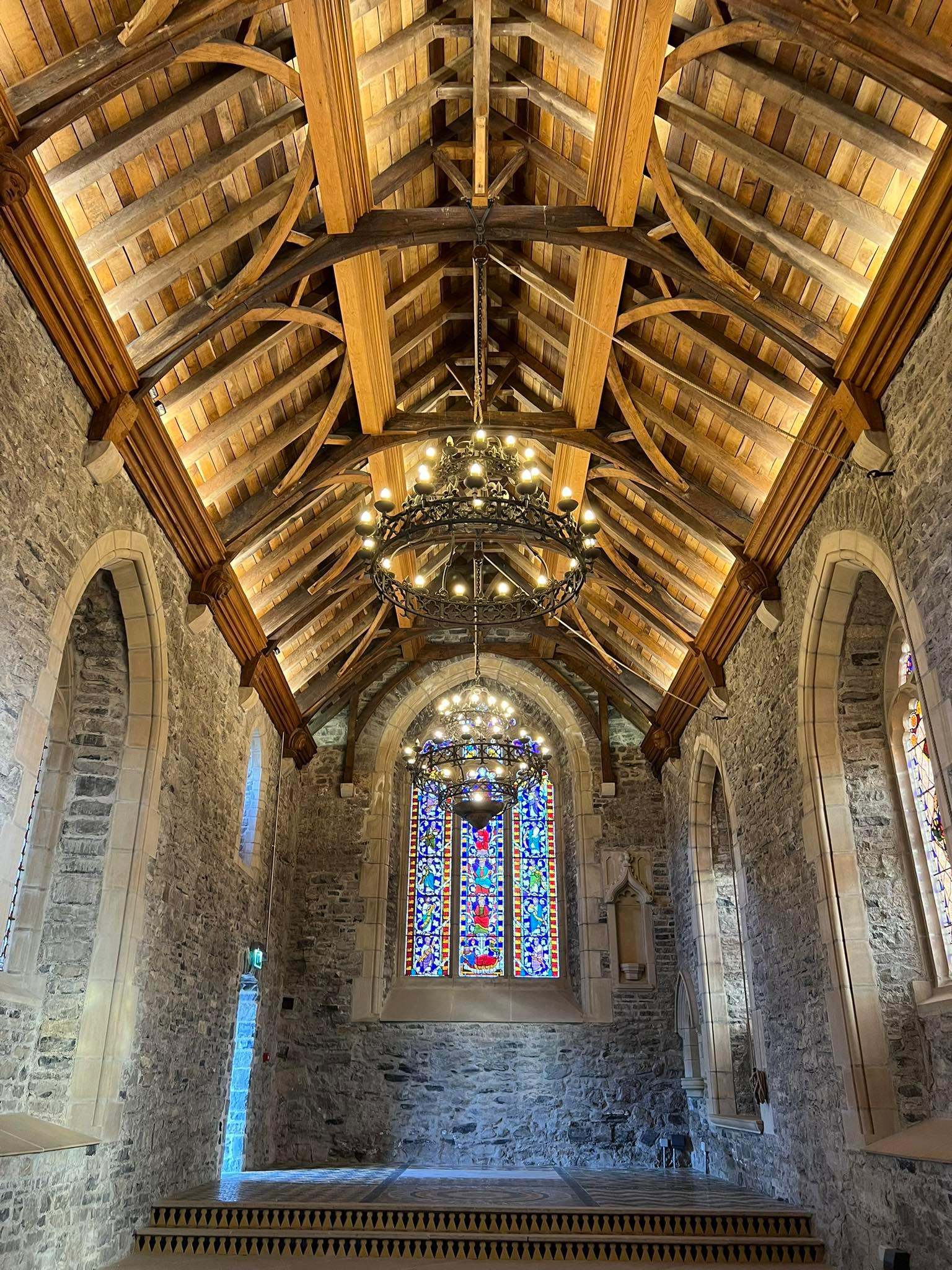
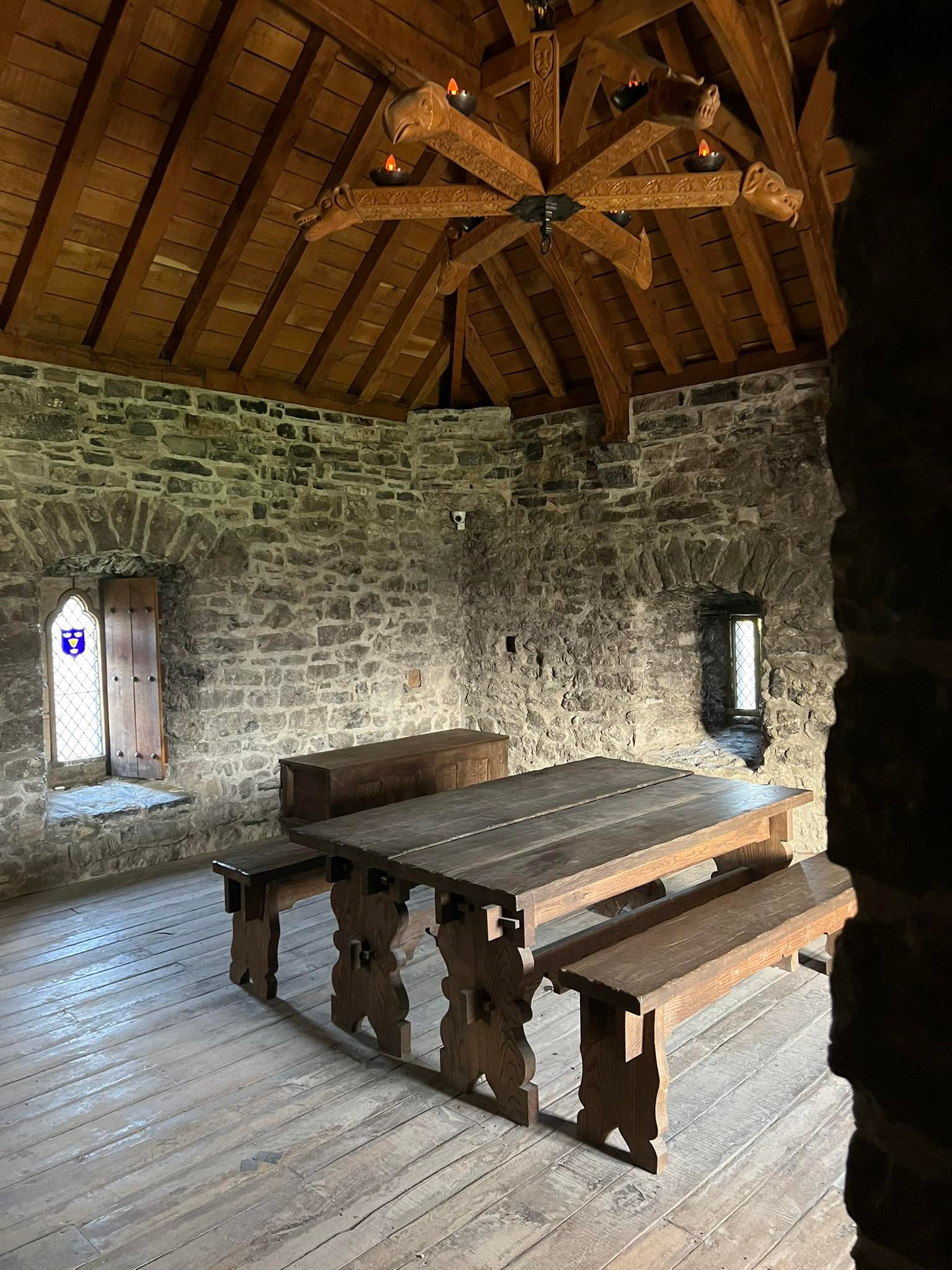
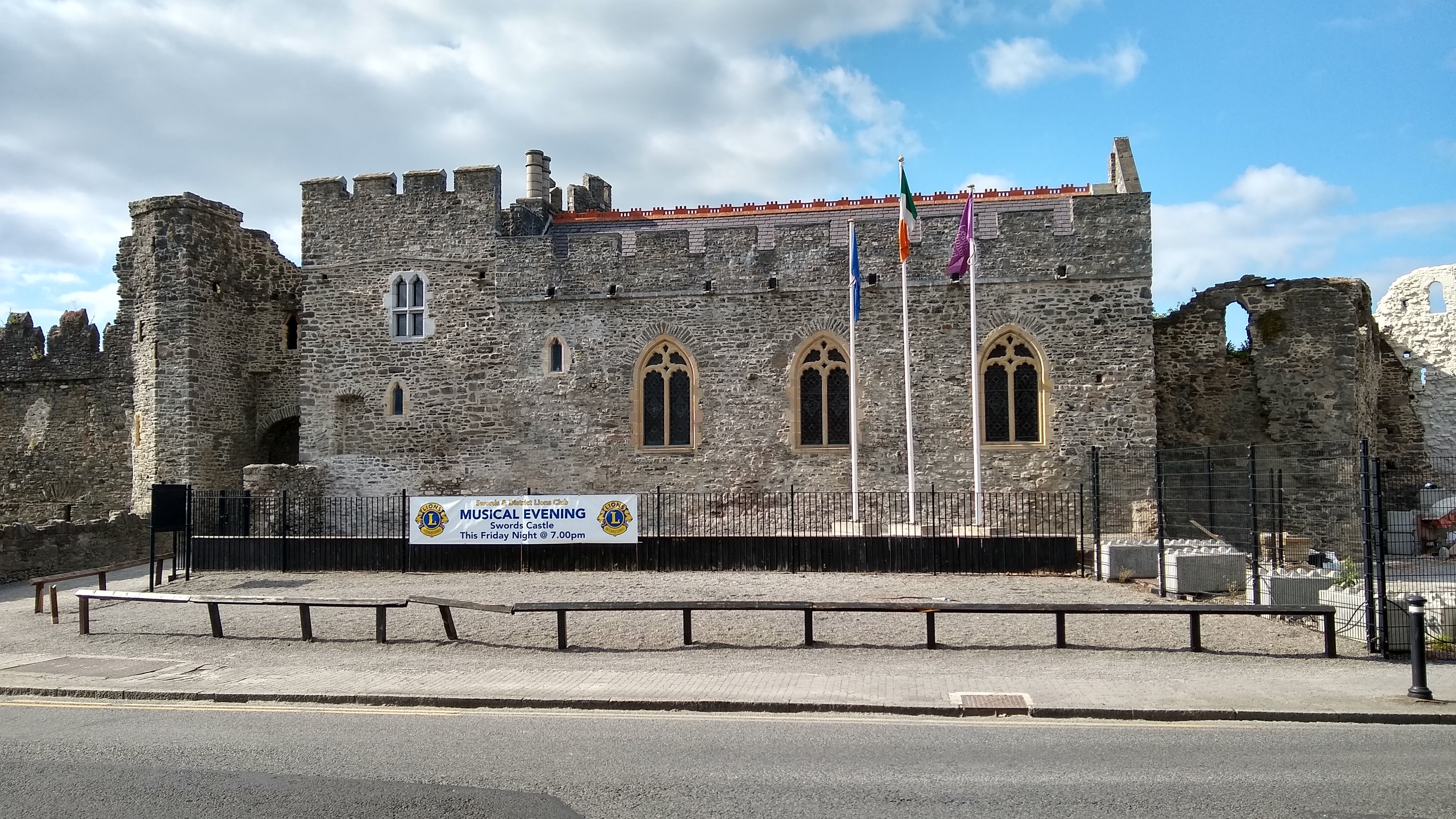
- Clockwise, from top: Swords Castle wall with Constable’s Tower; The Chapel, Swords Castle; interior of the Constable's Tower; Swords Castle from Main Street, Swords

Site information
- Owner: Fingal County Council
- Open to the public: Yes

Location
- Location of Swords Castle within Dublin
- Coordinates: 53°27′34″N 6°13′12″W

Site history
- Built: Around 1200 AD
- Built by: John Comyn (bishop)
- In use: Still in use today

National monument of Ireland
- Reference no.: 340

Swords Castle is an early medieval castle located in Swords, County Dublin. Originally built for the Archbishops of Dublin in the early 13th century near the Ward River, some of the castle estate had fallen into disrepair by the 14th and 15th centuries. At least partially occupied through the 16th and 17th centuries, the castle was used as a place of rendezvous by Anglo-Irish Catholic families during the 1641 Rebellion. The site was afforded protection as a national monument and placed under the guardianship of the Office of Public Works in the early 20th century. As of the late 20th and early 21st century, the site was subject to a program of "long-term phased restoration", and is partially opened for tours. The site is listed on Fingal County Council's Record of Protected Structures.

== Description ==
The castle was built as the manorial residence of the first Anglo-Norman Archbishop of Dublin, John Comyn, around 1200 or a little later in Swords, just north of Dublin. The castle was never strong in the military sense, but is unusual in that the perimeter wall of 305 metres is far larger than normal for an Irish castle. The walls enclose a large pentagonal walled area of nearly 6,000 m^{2} (1.5 acres) with a tower on the north, probably the Constable's residence, and an impressive gateway complex on the south. Within the castle were the archbishop's apartments, apartments for knights and a banqueting hall. The warder may have occupied the quarters to the left of the gate, while to the right was the janitor's room with the priest's room overhead. The adjoining chapel, built in the late 13th century, was probably used as the archbishop's private oratory. Other buildings, recorded for an inquisition in 1326, have now vanished, including the great hall on the east side of the enclosure.

== History ==
A monastic settlement attributed to St. Columba (or Colmcille) existed in Swords from the 6th century, which in the 17th century was brought under the control of the archbishop of Dublin. In 1181 John Comyn succeeded Laurence O'Toole as archbishop and it appears that he chose Swords at some point as his chief residence, probably because the prebend of Swords was of considerable wealth and was much sought after. The evidence is that he had a manor in Swords by 1192, as a patent was granted to him there on that date authorising him to hold an annual fair lasting a week on the feast day (9 June) of St. Columba. It is generally accepted that the castle was then built around 1200 or a little later as the manorial residence of the archbishop. The archbishop had his own seneschal at Swords and an ecclesiastical court was also held there. In 1216 the manor of Swords was granted to Henry de Loundres, the second English Archbishop, and it is recorded that in 1220 one William Galrote held the position of chief constable of the castle.

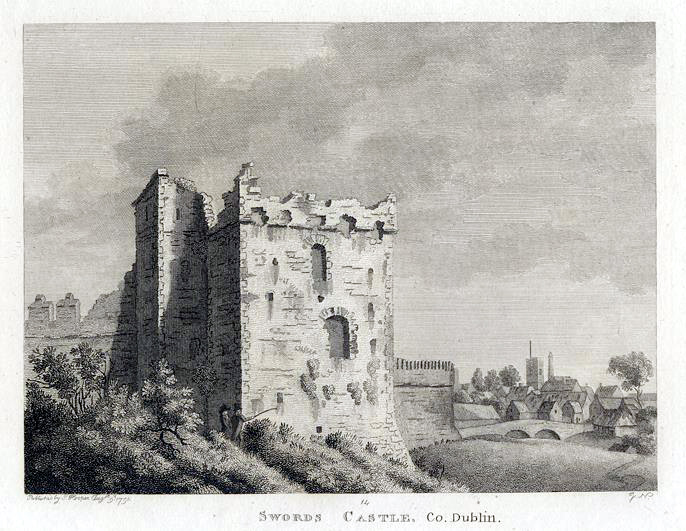
The castle in 1792

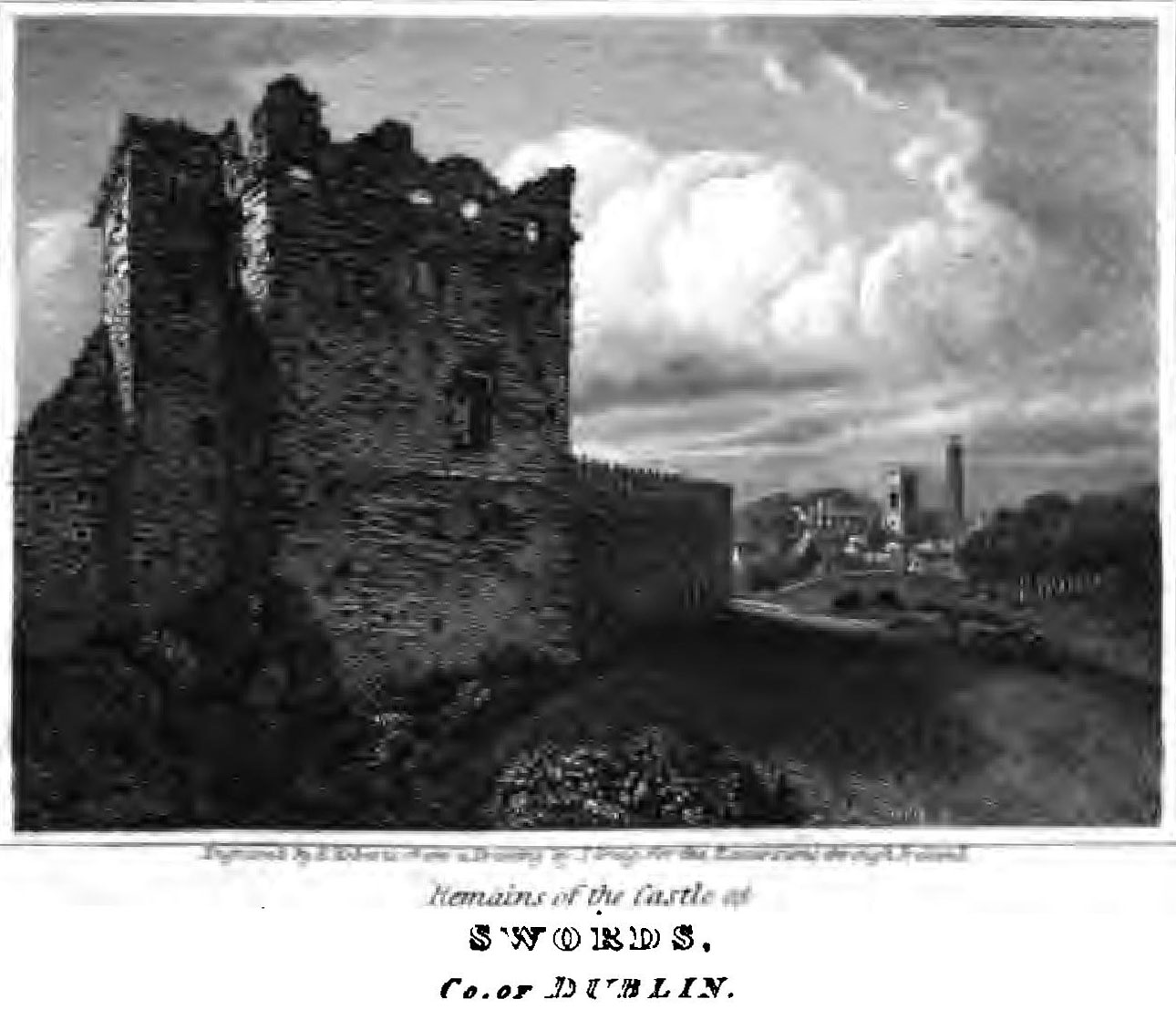
The castle in 1820

It appears that the castle was occupied for the next hundred years by successive Archbishops of Dublin until Archbishop Alexander de Bicknor, who built a new archepiscopal palace at Tallaght in 1324. It appears by this stage that Swords Castle had been abandoned. The evidence for this is that in 1326 de Bicknor was accused of mishandling the treasury and the profits of his see were seized by the king and an inquisition was held before the Sheriff of Dublin on 14 March 1326. The purpose of the inquisition was to ascertain the profits of the See, and as part of this, a detailed description of Swords Castle was recorded. It is clear from this description that the castle had fallen into disrepair. In all likelihood Swords was abandoned because of damage sustained during the Bruce campaign in Ireland of 1317, which was known to have devastated the country south from Dundalk to the gates of Dublin. Although there is no direct evidence that Swords Castle had been attacked by Bruce's forces, it was not well fortified enough to withstand assault, and the probability is that the Archbishop had removed himself to Tallaght for safety reasons.

It is doubtful if all the buildings of the castle were ever repaired, but the stepped battlements suggest some form of occupancy during the 15th century, when it appears the castle was granted to retired archbishops. There is no documentary evidence to show that any of them resided there however. Instead, it seems that a portion at least of the castle was occupied by a constable during the 14th, 15th and early 16th centuries. As late as 1547 Thomas Fitzsimons of Swords was appointed constable, and subsequently the Barnewall family retained an interest in the constableship and tenancy of the castle. But by 1583, when briefly occupied by Dutch Protestants, it was described as "the quite spoiled old castle". The viceroy, Sir Henry Sydney, had some of the building repaired for the use of the colony of Dutch weavers who he hoped might 'show some example of industry to the lazy natives'.

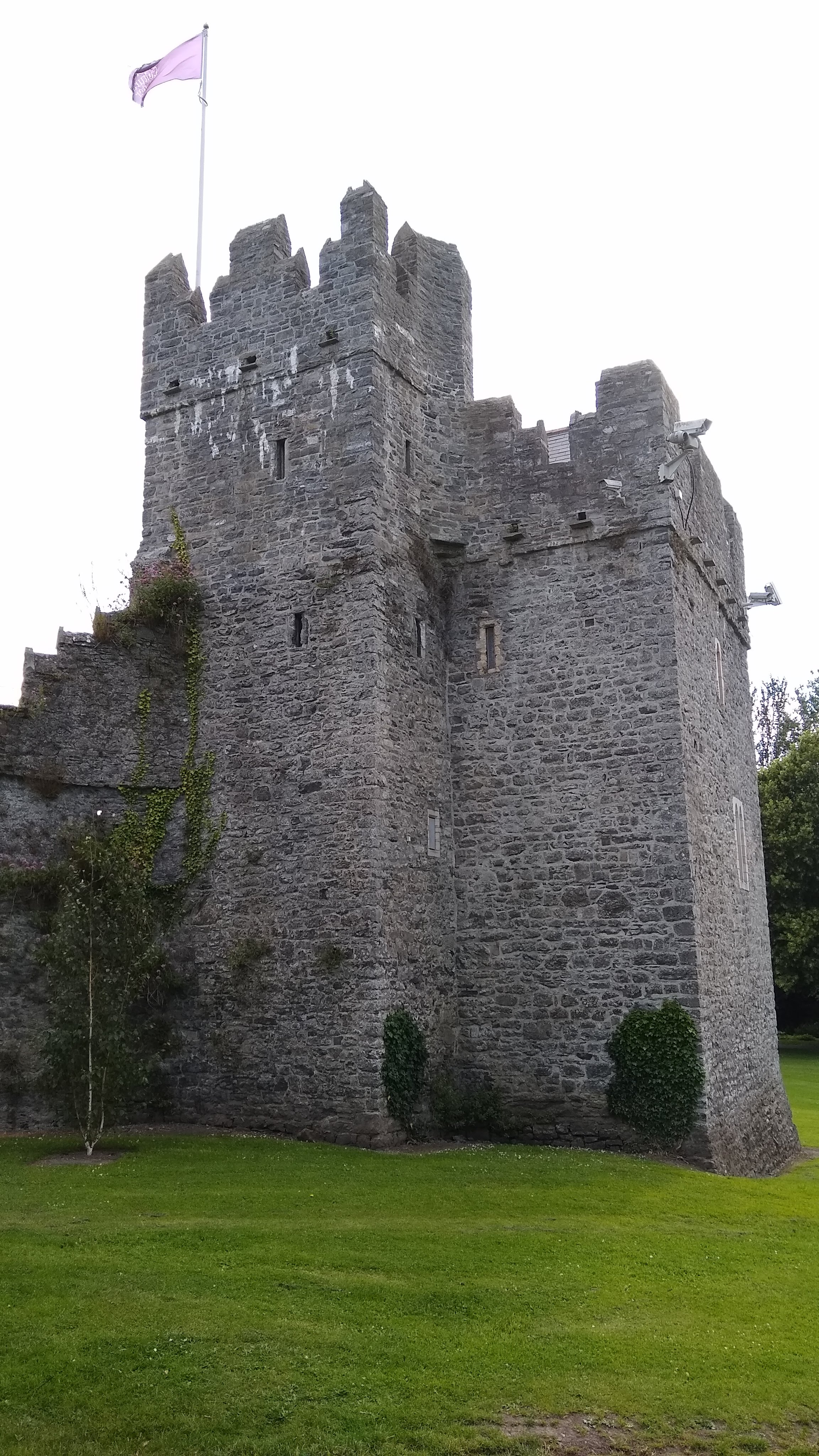
The Constable's Tower, Swords Castle

During the 1641 Rebellion the castle was chosen as the rendezvous for the Anglo-Irish Catholic families of The Pale. On 9 December of that year they assembled under arms at the castle in order to join the rebellion, but were attacked by Sir Charles Coote under orders of the Lords Justices. Coote put them to flight, chasing them out of their fortifications and killing two hundred of them. It is possible that some burials found during modern excavations of the castle relate to this incident.

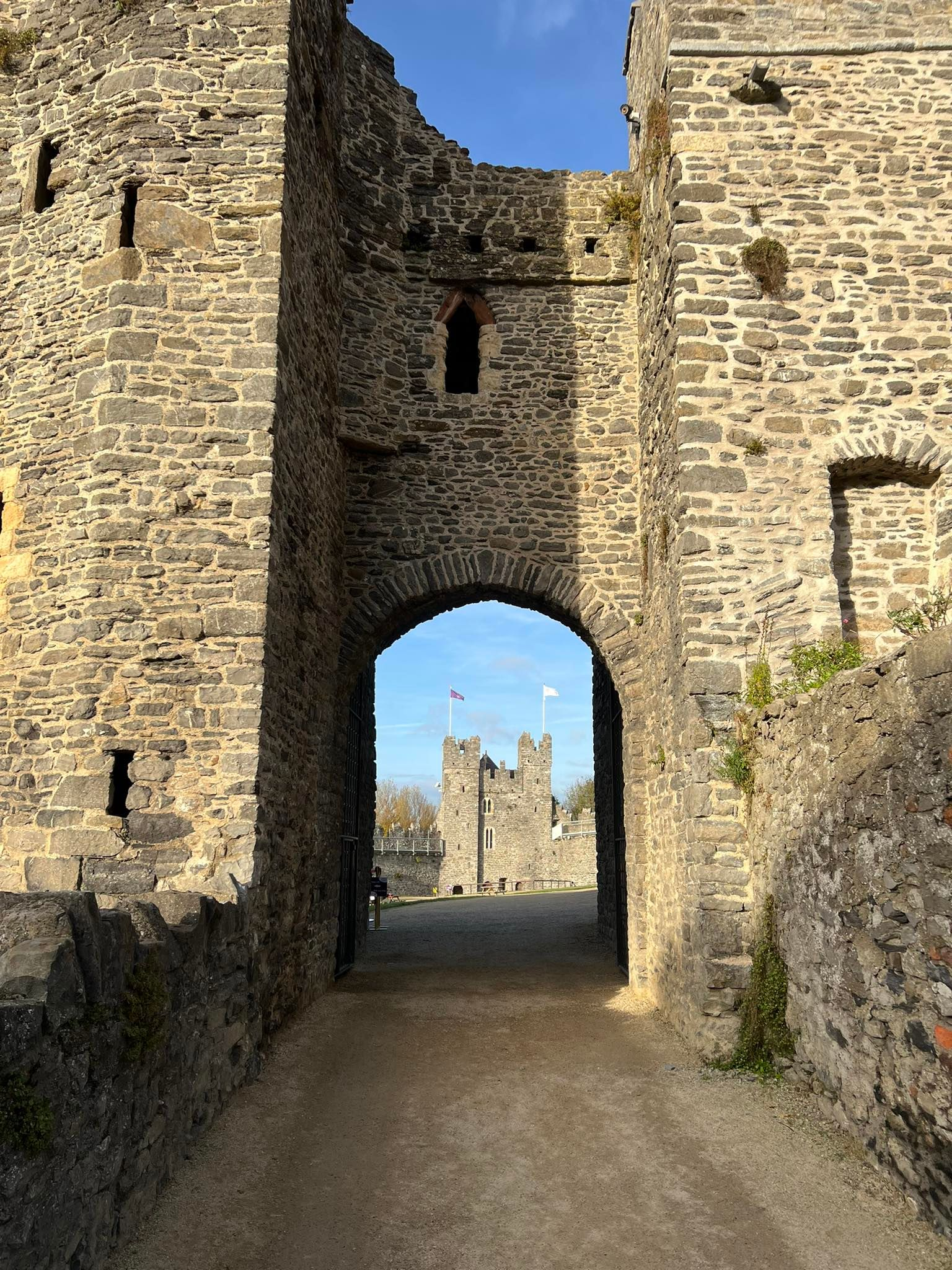
The Constable's Tower seen through the entrance to Swords Castle

Not much is known about the castle after that, but an Ordnance Survey map of 1837 shows the grounds or Bawn of the castle had been converted into a garden. After the Church of Ireland was disestablished in 1870 the castle was sold to the Cobbe family, who leased it to local shopkeeper Robert Savage. Savage turned the grounds of the castle into an orchard and sold the produce in his shop. In the 1930s the site was placed under the guardianship of the Office of Public Works, and in 1985 Dublin County Council (later Fingal County Council) purchased the castle with a view to its restoration.

The Parks Department of Fingal County Council carried out a number of studies, including a conservation study of the entire area, and in 1995 a plan was agreed by the council for the long-term phased restoration of the castle. In 1996 work commenced on the restoration of Constable's Tower, and this was completed in 1998. The restoration of the rest of the castle is still ongoing and when complete, Swords Castle is intended to become a tourist attraction. The newly renovated castle was used as a film location for the production of TV series The Tudors in spring 2010. In 2019, the chapel opened its doors to weddings. Swords Castle and Courtyard is open to the public from Tuesday to Sunday.
