= 1307 in Ireland =

- Centuries: 12th; 13th; 14th; 15th; 16th
- Decades: 1280s; 1290s; 1300s; 1310s; 1320s
- See also: Other events of 1307; List of years in Ireland

Events from the year 1307 in Ireland:

== Incumbent ==
- Lord: Edward I (until 7 July), then Edward II

== Events ==
- 10 July - Richard de Havering (or Richard de Haverings) (died 1341) was elected Archbishop of Dublin in March and appointed 10 July; although he received possession of the see's temporalities on 13 September, he was never consecrated and after enjoying the dignity and profits of the see resigned 21 November 1310.
- Donnchad Muimnech Ó Cellaigh, Lord of Uí Maine, killed most of the English of Roscommon at Ahascragh, in response to the burning of the town by Edmund Butler.
- Alexander de Bicknor appointed Lord Treasurer of Ireland
- Lea Castle was besieged

== Deaths ==
- Thomas FitzGerald, 3rd Baron Desmond
- Donnchad Muimnech Ó Cellaigh
