= 1328 in Ireland =

- Centuries: 12th; 13th; 14th; 15th; 16th
- Decades: 1300s; 1310s; 1320s; 1330s; 1340s
- See also: Other events of 1328; List of years in Ireland

Events from the year 1328 in Ireland.

== Incumbent ==
- Lord: Edward III

== Deaths ==
- Muiris Ó Gibealláin, Irish jurist, singer, philosopher, poet, and musician
