= 1329 in Ireland =

- Centuries: 12th; 13th; 14th; 15th; 16th
- Decades: 1300s; 1310s; 1320s; 1330s; 1340s
- See also: Other events of 1329; List of years in Ireland

Events from the year 1329 in Ireland.

== Incumbent ==
- Lord: Edward III

== Events ==
- June 10 – Braganstown massacre, County Louth: over 160 killed.
- 10 August – The battle of Ardnocher took place near Horseleap between the forces of Thomas Butler and William Mac Geoghegan. Mac Geoghegan forces won and Butler and many of his soldiers were killed.

== Deaths ==
- 10 June – Maol Ruanaidh Cam Ó Cearbhaill, tiompan musician, in Braganstown massacre.
