= 1318 in Ireland =

- Centuries: 12th; 13th; 14th; 15th; 16th
- Decades: 1290s; 1300s; 1310s; 1320s; 1330s
- See also: Other events of 1318; List of years in Ireland

Events from the year 1318 in Ireland.

== Incumbent ==
- Lord: Edward II

== Events ==
- 10 May – Battle of Dysert O'Dea: The Hiberno-Norman Richard de Clare is defeated and killed by Conor O'Dea in alliance with O'Briens, MacNamaras and Ó hEithirs.
- 29 September – Alexander de Bicknor arrives in Ireland.
- 14 October – Battle of Faughart, a.k.a. Battle of Dundalk: a Hiberno-Norman force defeats a Scots-Irish army commanded by Edward Bruce (who is killed in the battle), ending the Bruce campaign in Ireland.
- Beginning of the Kildare Supremacy.
- William FitzJohn, Bishop of Ossory appointed Lord Chancellor of Ireland
- Cork City was given an English Royal Charter and for many centuries was an outpost of Old English culture.

== Deaths ==
- 10 May – Richard de Clare, Thomas de Lees, Henry de Capella, James de Caunteton, John de Caunteton, all killed at Dysart O'Dea.
- Gilbert de Roache "killed at Ross by the burgesses of Ross."
- Edward Bruce of Scotland killed in battle.
