= John de Ponz =

English-born administrator in Ireland (d. 1307)

John de Ponz, also called John de Ponte, John Savan, or John of Bridgwater (c.1248–1307) was an English-born administrator, lawyer and judge in the reign of King Edward I. He served in the Royal Household in England for several years before moving to Ireland, where he practised in the Royal Courts as the King's Serjeant-at-law (Ireland). He later served as a justice in eyre (itinerant justice), and then as a justice of the Court of Common Pleas (Ireland). He was a gifted lawyer, but as a judge was accused of acting unjustly. A case he heard in Kilkenny in 1302 can be seen as a precursor of the Kilkenny Witchcraft Trials of 1324, and involved several of the main actors in the Trials.

== Family ==
He was born in or shortly before 1248 in Bridgwater, Somerset (hence the de Ponz/Ponte version of his surname, which translates as "John of the Bridge"). He later owned property in the town. His father's name is unknown, but he had at least two brothers, Henry and Roger. Roger was a clerk to Thomas Weyland, the English Chief Justice of the Common Pleas: soon after Weyland's removal from office for maladministration and his resulting exile in 1289/90, Roger took up employment in Ireland on the staff of the Justiciar of Ireland, William de Vesci.

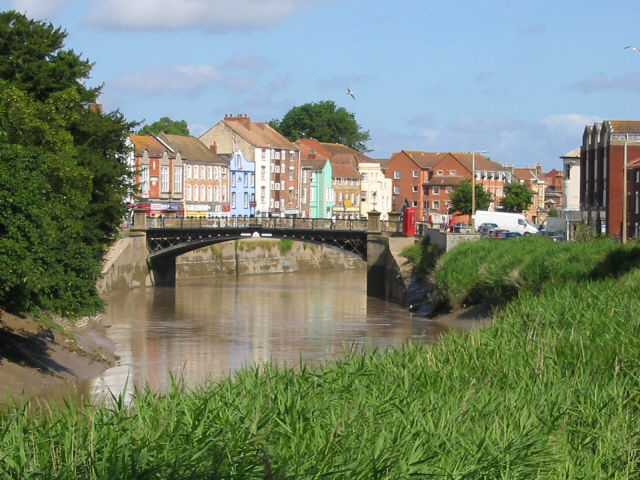
Bridgwater Town Bridge: John was born in Bridgwater

== Early career ==
John was in the entourage of the future King Edward I of England in 1269–70. In about 1372 he joined the household of Edward's first Queen, Eleanor of Castile, whom he served for many years in several capacities, including deputy steward of the Queen's household and Constable of Leeds Castle, Kent, which the Queen bought in 1378. A writ dated 1287 for a debt of 24 marks owed by John of Arden, of Kent, to John de Ponz as Constable of Leeds is in the National Archives.

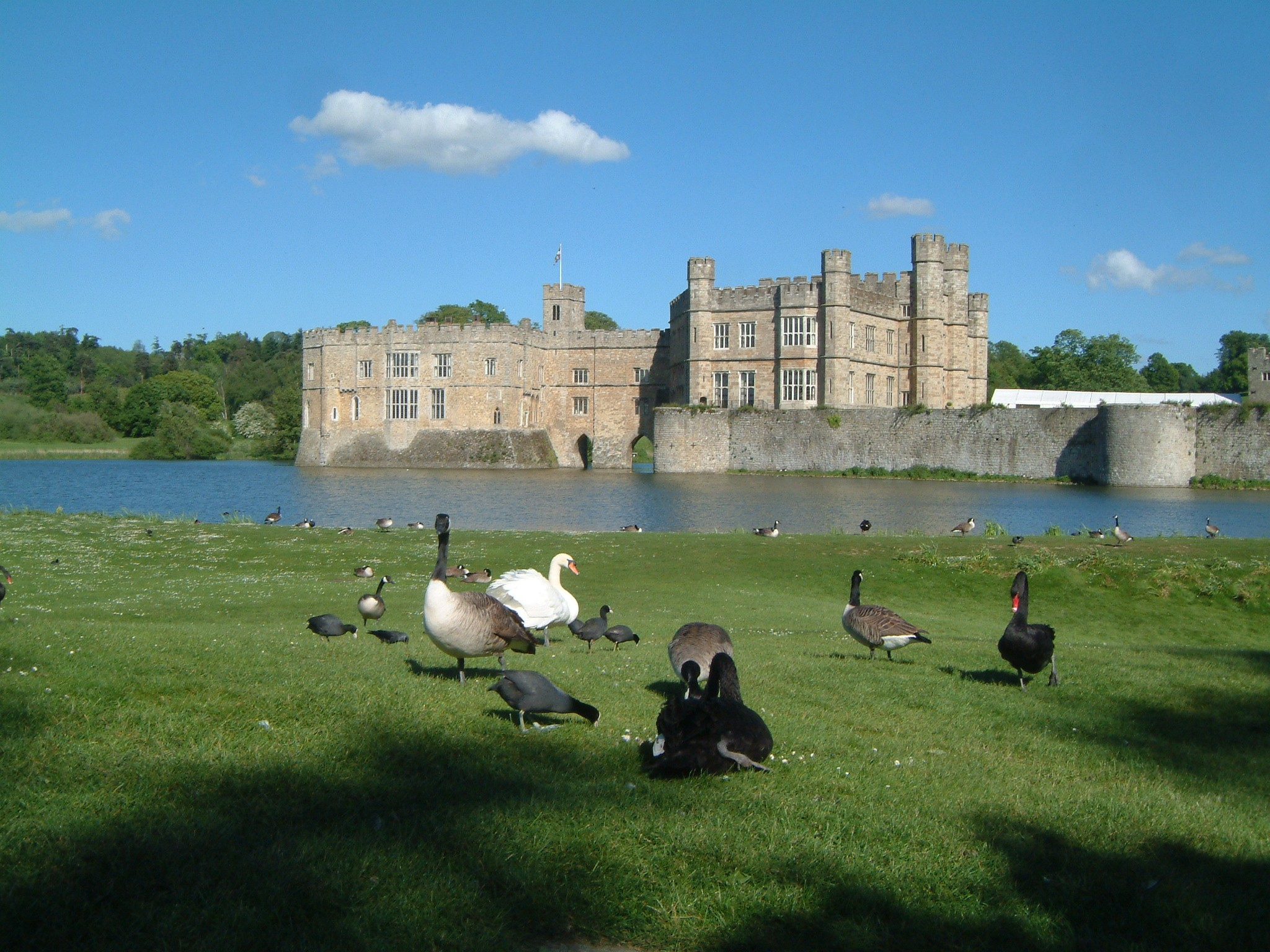
Leeds Castle, Kent: de Ponz was Constable of the Castle, which belonged to Queen Eleanor of Castile, first wife of Edward I

== In Ireland ==
It may have been the Queen's death in November 1290 which prompted him to join his brother Roger in Ireland the following year. He was clearly a qualified lawyer, though no details of his legal education survive. He became King's Serjeant in 1292, and was unusual in acting for the Crown only, whereas most Serjeants, like his contemporary William of Bardfield, also took private clients. His lack of a private income probably explains why his salary was fixed at 20 marks a year, twice that of the other Serjeants. His workload was alleviated by the appointment of John de Neville as an extra Serjeant in 1295. Hart argues that his career shows him to have been a lawyer of considerable talent. This is reflected in the fact that he was the most active royal attorney in pleading cases before the Justiciar's Court. He was also licensed to appear before the Court of Common Pleas (Ireland) and the Court of Exchequer (Ireland).

== Judge ==
He remained Serjeant until 1300, while also acting regularly as an extra judge of assize and gaol delivery. He may also have served briefly as a temporary judge of the Common Pleas in 1295–96. In 1300 he was one of the four justices appointed to hear the pleas in County Louth (William Alysaundre, Robert de Littlebury and Sir Walter l'Enfant the younger being among the others). In 1301 he received a permanent appointment as justice in eyre (itinerant justice) for four counties including County Kilkenny (where he heard a notable case involving the future actors in the Witchcraft Trials), County Tipperary (where his conduct gave rise to complaints of injustice), and County Cork. In 1302-3 he was itinerant justice for County Meath, jointly with Robert de Littlebury, with a salary of 40 marks. In 1304 he was appointed a justice of the Court of Common Pleas (which was then simply called "the Bench").

== Judge- the case of Treasure Trove (1302) and the Kilkenny Witchcraft Trials (1324) ==
In 1302, as he was the designated royal justice for County Kilkenny, the King ordered him to investigate a serious complaint by William Outlawe, a leading citizen of Kilkenny city, which foreshadowed the celebrated Witch Trials of 1324. Outlawe alleged that William le Kyteler or Kiteler, High Sheriff of County Kilkenny, on the orders of the Seneschal of Kilkenny, Fulk de la Freyne, had entered his house with an armed force, dug up the floorboards, and unlawfully carried off "by night" a very large sum of money, amounting to £3000 deposited with William Outlawe in trust by Adam and Alice le Blound of Callan (Outlawe's mother and stepfather), and £100 of William's own money. John was to investigate the complaint, retrieve the money, and secure it with his seal in a safe place. The Crown had a particular interest in the case since it had received reports that Adam's money was treasure trove, and therefore Crown property, although the writ stated that no action should be taken concerning the money, pending a judgement of the Royal Court on its ownership.

It is noteworthy that Outlawe, Kyteler and Adam and Alice le Blound (and their families) were at the centre of the Kilkenny Witch Trials twenty years later. Adam's wife Alice was none other than Alice Kyteler, the celebrated Witch of Kilkenny, and Outlawe was Alice's son by her first husband. Outlawe also seems to have been his mother's business partner.

There was a further important aspect to the case, which had a bearing on the later Trials: the Sheriff and Seneschal pleaded that the money seized from Outlawe was forfeit by Adam and Alice to the Crown, as the penalty for their numerous crimes, including the homicide of Alice's first husband, the elder William Outlawe, and for sheltering a notorious thief called Roesia Outlawe, for which crimes Adam, Alice and Roesia were all in prison under sentence of death. Adam and Alice pleaded in return that the charges of homicide and other crimes were a malicious invention, that Roesia had never been convicted of theft, and that all of them had found sureties for their good behaviour, and petitioned for their release. The King ordered their release from prison, and commanded the officials to give an account of their conduct to the Justiciar of Ireland. The decision was no doubt influenced by the fact that Adam and Alice were wealthy and influential (Adam was a money lender, while Alice also had extensive business interests in Kilkenny), and the King himself had borrowed money from them. No further action was taken against them over the death of Alice's first husband, (most likely, as they alleged, the charge was a malicious invention) although inevitably the allegations resurfaced during the Witchcraft Trials.

== Judge – the case of Elena Macotyr (1304) ==
We have another valuable glimpse of de Ponz in his judicial role when he was serving as justice for County Tipperary in 1304, shortly before his elevation to the Court of Common Pleas. His conduct in this case, where his judgment was successfully appealed, suggests that he acted in an unfair and high-handed manner. Walter, son of William de Dermor, brought an action for novel disseisin (the usual remedy for a plaintiff who claimed to have been wrongfully dispossessed of their property) against Elena Macotyr, his stepmother, and her second husband Thomas le Bret, to recover a house in Cashel and 300 acres (1.2 km^{2}) of land. He was successful, but Elena and Thomas appealed to the Justiciar's court: the main grounds of appeal were bias on the part of certain of the jurors, and that they had not been given the fifteen days notice to which they were entitled to answer the summons. De Ponz, in defence of his conduct, gave the somewhat haughty reply that he had allowed the case to proceed "by his own will". It seems that the appeal was upheld, and that Elena and Thomas retained possession of the disputed lands.

A less contentious case was an action by John de Cogan in assize of mort d'ancestor, i.e. an action by the heir to property against another party who had wrongfully taken it. The case was heard by De Ponz and Thomas Cantock, the Lord Chancellor of Ireland, and the plaintiff was successful. Cogan was clearly a somewhat litigious individual, as shown by a previous lawsuit in 1293–4 against the Abbey of St Thomas the Martyr (near Dublin) over the right to ownership of lands at Ballymckelly.

== Personal life ==
He held lands in Dorset as well as at Bridgwater, and also at Grelly in County Dublin, which he held as sub-tenant from the tenant in chief, Jordan Dardis (or Dardyz). His Irish estates provided him with a useful source of income as well as a residence.

He was not a priest, though he may have taken minor orders, which were not an impediment to marriage. Clearly, he was not celibate: there was an official complaint against him in 1291 by the cellarer of Norwich Cathedral, for assault and for consorting with prostitutes within the precincts of the cathedral.

One Avelina atte Crutch of Essex, the wife of Alan Waldeschef, had her marriage annulled before 1397, on the basis of a pre-existing contract of marriage with John. As far as we know the couple never married.

He was still alive in the autumn of 1306, and probably died in 1307.

== Sources ==
- Ball, F. Elrington The Judges in Ireland 1221–1921 London John Murray 1926
- Brand, Paul "Bridgewater, John (Savan) of, (John de Ponte)" Cambridge Dictionary of Irish Biography 2009
- Hand, Geoffrey English Law in Ireland 1290–1324 Cambridge University Press 1967
- Hart, A.R. A History of the King's Serjeants-at-law in Ireland Dublin Four Courts Press 2000
- Hewer, Stephen Justice for All? Access by ethnic groups to the English royal courts in Ireland 1252–1318 Trinity College Dublin thesis 2018
- O'Flanagan, Roderick Lives of the Lord Chancellors and Keepers of the Great Seal of Ireland London 2 Volumes 1870
- Patent Roll 31 Edward I
