= Garrett Nugent =

Garrett Nugent (1822–1898) was an Irish Anglican priest.

Nugent was educated at Trinity College, Dublin. and ordained in 1849. After a curacy at Clontibret he was an SPG missionary in Vaughan, Ontario from 1851 until 1862. He then held incumbencies at Ardnurcher and Balrathboyne. He was Archdeacon of Meath from 1882 until his death on 7 March 1898.
