= 1319 in Ireland =

- Centuries: 12th; 13th; 14th; 15th; 16th
- Decades: 1290s; 1300s; 1310s; 1320s; 1330s
- See also: Other events of 1319; List of years in Ireland

Events from the year 1319 in Ireland.

== Incumbent ==
- Lord: Edward II

== Events ==
- A bridge over the River Liffey was built. It resulted in the urban centre of Old Kilcullen (now simply Kilcullen) moving 2 km north-east to the bridge.
