= 1321 in Ireland =

- Centuries: 12th; 13th; 14th; 15th; 16th
- Decades: 1300s; 1310s; 1320s; 1330s; 1340s
- See also: Other events of 1321; List of years in Ireland

Events from the year 1321 in Ireland.

== Incumbent ==
- Lord: Edward II

== Events ==
- Roger Utlagh, Prior of the Order of St. John of Jerusalem, Kilmainham appointed Lord Chancellor of Ireland
