= Walter l'Enfant =

Sir Walter l'Enfant the younger (died c. 1317), lord of Carnalway, County Kildare was an Irish judge and landowner.

He was the son of Sir Walter l'Enfant, or l'Enfaunt (died c. 1294) who, like his son, was a judge of the Court of the Justiciar of Ireland, and was also Seneschal of County Kildare. He married Joan Butler, daughter of John Butler and Margaret, daughter and co-heiress of David Fitzwilliam, 3rd Baron of Naas and Matilda de Lacy. Through the first Sir Walter's marriage to Joan, the l'Enfant family acquired the lordship of Carnalway.

The younger Walter entered the household of King Edward I of England in 1279. He became Chief Justice of the Court of the Justiciar in 1298, and held the office until 1311, apart from two intervals when he was Chief Justice in eyre (circuit). As justice in eyre, he was assigned to County Louth in 1300, together with John de Ponz, Robert de Littlebury and William Alysaundre. He was knighted on an unknown date.

He was a close associate of John FitzGerald, 1st Earl of Kildare: he accompanied him to the Netherlands, and was a witness to the truce of 1295 which ended Kildare's lengthy feud with Richard Óg de Burgh, 2nd Earl of Ulster. He was summoned twice for military service in Scotland. He was Constable of Kildare Castle 1302-1310. In 1308 he was given licence to go to England. He probably died before 1317.

He married Elizabeth, by whom he had issue, including the third Walter l'Enfant, who saw military service in the 1330s. In 1346 he became Keeper of Carlow Castle and a keeper of the peace for County Kildare.

After her first husband's death Elizabeth remarried William de Wellesley, an ancestor of the Duke of Wellington.

== Sources ==
- Ball, F. Elrington The Judges in Ireland 1221-1921 London John Murray 1926
- Mackay, Ronan "L'Enfaunt, Walter" Cambridge Dictionary of Irish Biography 2009
