= 1320 in Ireland =

- Centuries: 12th; 13th; 14th; 15th; 16th
- Decades: 1300s; 1310s; 1320s; 1330s; 1340s
- See also: Other events of 1320; List of years in Ireland

Events from the year 1320 in Ireland.

== Incumbent ==
- Lord: Edward II

== Events ==
- The "Medieval University of Dublin" founded
