= William Alysaundre =

Irish judge and Crown official

William Alysaundre or Alesander (died after 1313) was an Irish judge and Crown official in the reigns of King Edward I of England and his son Edward II.

He was living in Dublin in 1286, and was probably born there. In 1299 he was appointed High Sheriff of Kildare, being the first recorded holder of the office.

In 1300 he was appointed one of the four itinerant justices for County Louth (John de Ponz, Robert de Littlebury and Sir Walter l'Enfant the younger being the others). He went on circuit as the itinerant judge in County Tipperary in 1305-6, and an order survives in the Close Rolls of 1306 for the payment of his half-years' salary of £10 in 7ith his duties as a judge in that county. In 130l he was also acting as a justice itinerant in County Cork. He was appointed a justice of the Court of the Justiciar of Ireland in 1311. In 1302 he was itinerant justice for County Meath, and received £20, in part payment of his salary of £40 per annum. In 1304 he was one of the judges nominated to hold an eyre (circuit), which the King then cancelled "as he does not wish the eyre to take place at present" (the eyre system in Ireland was rapidly falling into disuse, and finally ceased to operate after 1322).

== Assize of 1313 ==
He was Deputy Justiciar of Ireland in 1313. In that capacity he went on assize to County Tipperary again (sitting in Cashel) with Walter de Thornbury, the Lord Chancellor of Ireland, in March. While they also heard civil cases, and the warrant of appointment refers only to such cases, the main business of the assize was the trial of William Ohassy for the murder of John de Nash, of which he was found guilty. He was condemned to be hanged.

The two judges held a second session of the assize in Cork City in early August 1313. Shortly afterwards Thornbury lost his life in a shipwreck, on his way to the Papal Court at Avignon to secure election as Archbishop of Dublin. Alysaundre's own date of death is not recorded.

== Descendants ==
The William Alessaundre, merchant of Dublin, who had licence to travel outside Ireland in 1355 was probably a relative of the judge: he may have been a direct descendant, as the judge is not known to have been in holy orders, and therefore was not celibate. As was customary the younger William was given the power to appoint an attorney to manage his Irish affairs during his absence.

== Sources ==
- Ball, F. Elrington The Judges in Ireland 1221-1921 London John Murray 1926
- Calendar of Irish Chancery Letters c.1244-1509
- Calendar of Irish Justiciary Rolls
- Patent Rolls and Close Rolls Edward I and Edward III
- O'Flanagan, J. Roderick Lives of the Lord Chancellors and Keepers of the Great Seal of Ireland London 2 Volumes 1870
