= 1327 in Ireland =

- Centuries: 12th; 13th; 14th; 15th; 16th
- Decades: 1300s; 1310s; 1320s; 1330s; 1340s
- See also: Other events of 1327; List of years in Ireland

Events from the year 1327 in Ireland.

== Incumbent ==
- Lord: Edward II (until 25 January), then Edward III

== Events ==
Robert the Bruce visits Ireland and signs a truce with Henry Mandeville at Antrim.

== Deaths ==
- Murchadh Ó Madadhan, King of Síol Anmchadha
