= 1339 in Ireland =

- Centuries: 12th; 13th; 14th; 15th; 16th
- Decades: 1310s; 1320s; 1330s; 1340s; 1350s
- See also: Other events of 1339; List of years in Ireland

Events from the year 1339 in Ireland.

== Incumbent ==
- Lord: Edward III

== Events ==
- 29 October – Ruaidhri O Ceallaigh is killed lby Cathal mac Aodh mac Eoghain O Conchobhair
- Toirdhealbach O Conchobhair marries the widow of Edmund de Burgh
- Edmond Albanach de Burgh is expelled from the western islands of Connacht to Ulster
- The Mint briefly reopens at Dublin (see 1302)
- Hostilities occur between the Anglo-Irish and Irish in Kildare, Meath and Kerry

== Deaths ==
- Ruaidri Ó Cellaigh, King of Uí Maine and Chief of the Name.
