= 1340 in Ireland =

- Centuries: 12th; 13th; 14th; 15th; 16th
- Decades: 1320s; 1330s; 1340s; 1350s; 1360s
- See also: Other events of 1340; List of years in Ireland

Events from the year 1340 in Ireland.

== Incumbent ==
- Lord: Edward III

== Events ==
- March – Edmond Albanach de Burgh is granted a royal pardon for the murder of his cousin in 1338 and returns from exile in the western isles of Connacht.
- Robert de Askeby appointed Lord Chancellor of Ireland

== Deaths ==
- Tomás Mág Samhradháin
