= 1315 in Ireland =

- Centuries: 12th; 13th; 14th; 15th; 16th
- Decades: 1290s; 1300s; 1310s; 1320s; 1330s
- See also: Other events of 1315; List of years in Ireland

Events from the year 1315 in Ireland.

== Incumbent ==
- Lord: Edward II

== Events ==
- 26 May – opening of Bruce campaign in Ireland by Edward Bruce. His army sacks Granard – he is proclaimed by Irish allies as King of Ireland.
- Dundalk was sacked by Edward De Bruce
- The first significant leader of the Butler clan, Edmond le Bottiler, became Earl of Carrig (Carrick-on-Suir)
