= 1316 in Ireland =

- Centuries: 12th; 13th; 14th; 15th; 16th
- Decades: 1290s; 1300s; 1310s; 1320s; 1330s
- See also: Other events of 1316; List of years in Ireland

Events from the year 1316 in Ireland.

== Incumbent ==
- Lord: Edward II

== Events ==
- 10 August – Battle of Athenry; rebellious Irish chiefs of Connacht defeated and killed.
- The Earl of Kildare founds the Augustinian Adare Friary in County Limerick.
- Ualgarg Mór Ó Ruairc is made king of West Breifne by Fedlim Ó Conchobair, king of Connacht.
