= Thomas Cantock =

English-born Irish bishop and judge

Thomas Cantock, Quantock or Cantok (died 3 February 1309) was an English-born cleric and judge in medieval Ireland, who held the offices of Bishop of Emly and Lord Chancellor of Ireland.

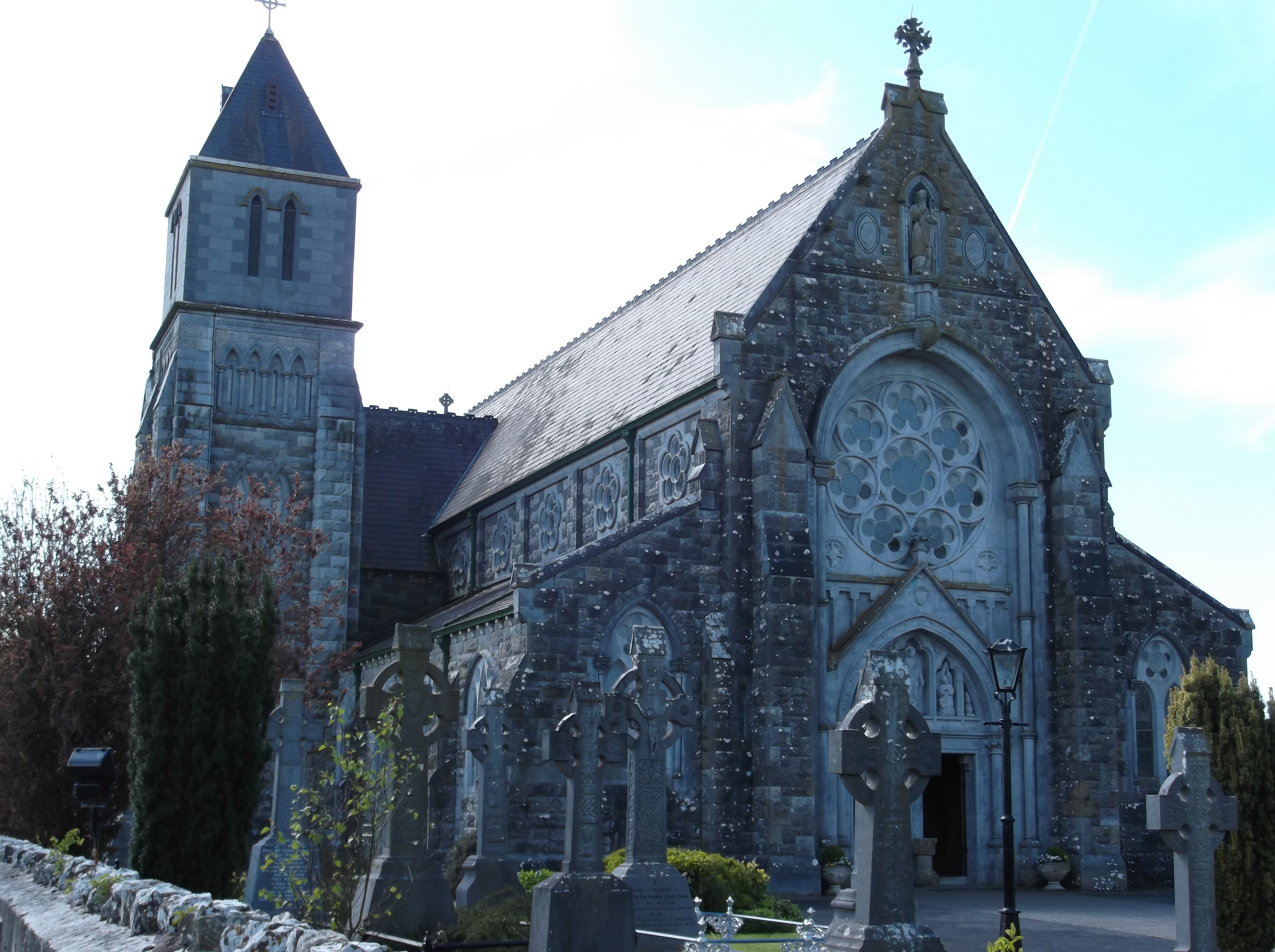
St Ailbe's Church, Emly: Cantock became Bishop of Emly in 1306

== Background and early life ==
O'Flanagan, writing in 1870, complained that the biographer of Cantock was faced with an almost complete lack of information about him. A good deal more is known about him today: in particular, a petition he addressed to the King in 1305, asking to be forgiven his debts, throws some light on his official duties, and illustrates the disturbed political conditions which had afflicted Ireland over the previous decade.

He was English by birth, and was probably a son of Roger de Cantock or de Quantock, a prominent merchant of Bristol. A petition of Roger to the Crown dated 1275–6, concerning property in Bristol, is in the National Archives. A younger Roger de Cantock, who visited Ireland during Thomas's tenure as Lord Chancellor, possibly to solicit a favour from him, was evidently his brother; he had four brothers in all. Another brother, Master John Cantock, witnessed a royal writ in Ireland in 1303, concerning the marriage contract between Robert Dardyz and Matilda Rochfort, and the sum Robert was bound to pay Matilda in the event of a divorce. John became Rector of Carrickfergus. John and Thomas were clearly close and Thomas on his deathbed entrusted the Great Seal of Ireland to his brother. Thomas was often known by the title "Master Thomas": according to the usage of the time, this meant that he had a university degree, most likely from the University of Oxford. His brother John was also styled Master. Thomas began his career as a clerk in the royal service; he was sent by King Edward I on a mission to Scotland in 1288.

== Lord Chancellor of Ireland ==
He was known to be a man "learned in the law", who had some unspecified appointment at the Royal Courts in Westminster, and acted as deputy to John Langton, the English Master of the Rolls, in 1290. He received his first clerical benefice in 1291.

No doubt his legal expertise was the reason why he was appointed Lord Chancellor of Ireland. He served as Chancellor from 1292 to 1295 or 1296, and he held the office again from 1306 to 1308. An order in the Close Rolls of 1298 survives for payment to him of £20, being half the salary due to him for his first term as Chancellor. He visited England regularly on official business connected with Ireland, and on a number of occasions addressed the English Parliament on questions of Irish law. The Patent Roll for 1295 gives evidence of a flurry of official activity in the Irish Chancery, much of it connected with the issue by Cantock of royal pardons. In 1300 he was one of three Government ministers charged with selecting 300 hobelars (light cavalry) for the war with Scotland, sending them to the King at Carlisle by Midsummer, and purveying sufficient food and wine for them.

He was Canon of Emly, and prebendary of Mollagymon, Cashel, County Tipperary. He was also the parish priest of Hardwick, Lincolnshire.

He was elected Bishop of Emly in 1306, and was installed as bishop in a ceremony at Christchurch Cathedral, Dublin, which was followed by a banquet at which he feasted first the nobility, and then the citizenry of Dublin, with a magnificence "unheard of in those times". In 1307 he was granted a third part of the manor of Ballyfermot by William Fitzwilliam and his wife Avice, who were members of the family which in time would come to own most of Dublin city south of the River Liffey. He is also known to have acquired lands at Chapelizod, then a village near Dublin city.

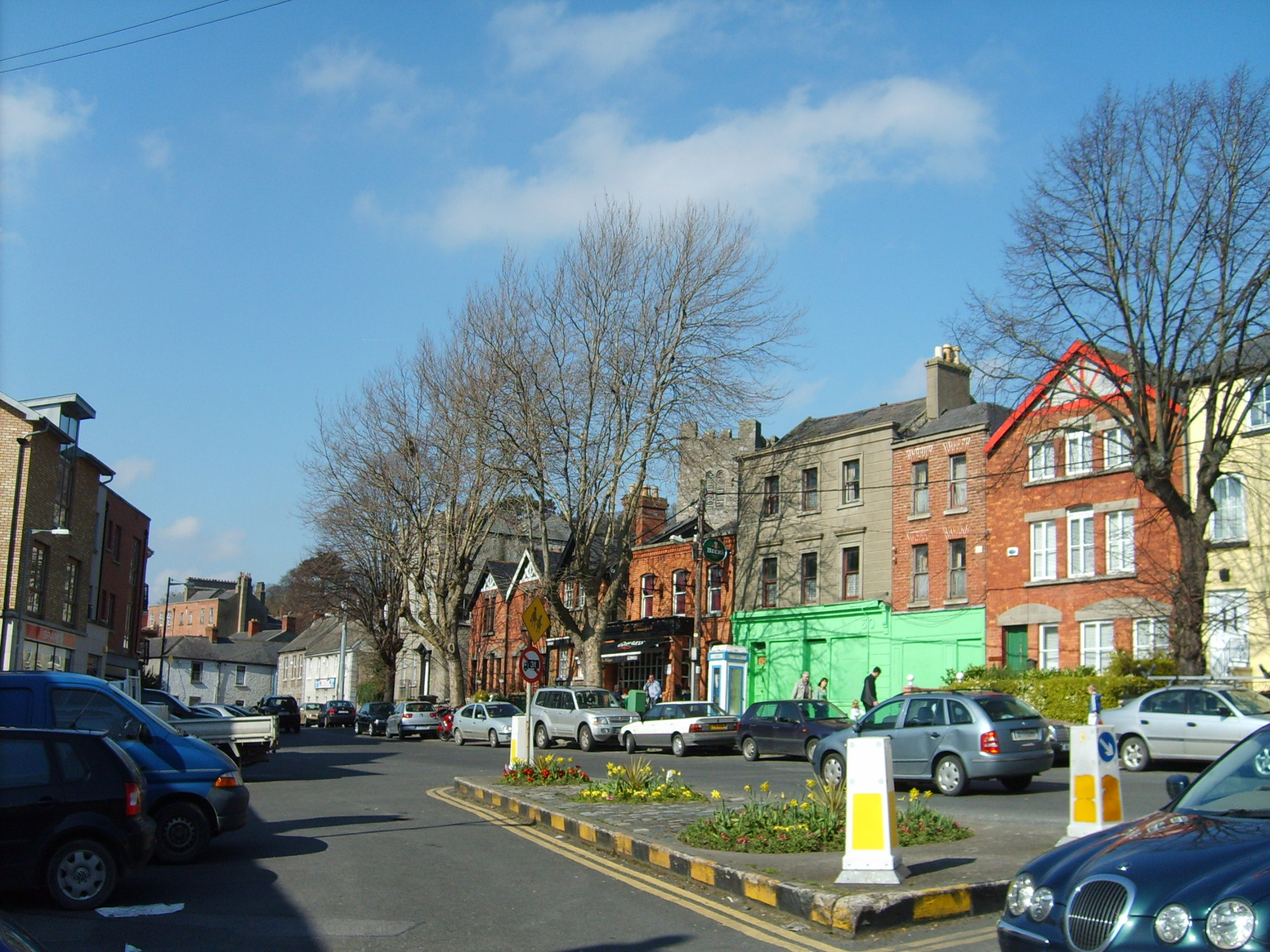
Chapelizod, Dublin, where Cantock owned lands

At the Parliament of Ireland held in 1305 a number of minor complaints of misconduct were made against him, but none of them seems to have stuck. He died on 3 February 1309, "the day after the Feast of the Purification of the Blessed Virgin". His official records were passed by his executors to his successor Walter de Thornbury; these records still exist. His brother John delivered up the Great Seal to Thornbury.

O'Flanagan states that from the little that is known of him, he seems to have been popular and hospitable.

According to Smyth, during his tenure as Lord Chancellor a serious fire destroyed all the Irish Chancery records; this is a reference to the Great Fire of Dublin of 1304, which destroyed much of the medieval city, as well as virtually all the official Irish records, which were housed in St Mary's Abbey.

From an undated record in the Calendar of Chancery Letters we do know something of a lawsuit which he and John de Ponz, justice of the Court of Common Pleas (Ireland) heard. This was a claim by John de Cogan of assize of mort d'ancestor, i.e. that he was the rightful owner through inheritance of lands (these seem to have been woods in Maynooth) of which he had been unlawfully deprived. The two judges found in his favour.

== His petition of 1305 ==
Our most intimate glimpse of him comes in a petition which he addressed to King Edward I of England in 1305 asking to be forgiven his debts to the English Crown. He asked the King to have regard to the great costs he had incurred "in the time of trouble" when John FitzGerald, 1st Earl of Kildare captured Richard de Burgh, 2nd Earl of Ulster. As the office of Justiciar of Ireland was vacant at the time, Cantock set as many of his own men as he could to the task of guarding the country, and when his funds turned out to be insufficient he borrowed £5 from one Richard de Cardiff. As a separate plea, he asked the King to remember that he had also borrowed £45 (a very substantial sum at the time) for arranging the marriages of two royal wards, Jordan Dardiz (or Dardyz) and Albert de Kenley.

The earlier part of the petition refers to the period of four months in 1294-5 when the Earl of Kildare captured and imprisoned the Earl of Ulster in Lea Castle "to the disturbance of the whole country"; the Irish Parliament eventually secured Ulster's release.

Cantock appealed for confirmation of his account to the present Justiciar. Sir John Wogan, saying that he had certainly heard the truth of the matter "if he wishes to witness it".

The petition seems to have been successful, as the endorsement on the Close Roll states that Cantock should be repaid the amounts claimed by him in instalments. The Crown no doubt remembered that in the late 1290s, his salary had been seriously in arrears.
