= 1334 in Ireland =

- Centuries: 12th; 13th; 14th; 15th; 16th
- Decades: 1310s; 1320s; 1330s; 1340s; 1350s
- See also: Other events of 1334; List of years in Ireland

Events from the year 1334 in Ireland.

== Incumbent ==
- Lord: Edward III

== Events ==
- Conchobar O Domnaill succeeds his father Aéd as King of Tír Conaill
- Earl of Desmond released
- Justicier Darcy campaigns against Ó Bríain and Mac Conmara in Thomond, Domhnall and Diarmaid Óg Mac Carthaigh in Desmond, Ó Tuathail and Ó Bróin in Leinster
- O Cellaig at war with O Conchobhair, until 1339
- 29 June Thomas de Burgh acting as deputy justiciar

== Deaths ==
- King Aed of Tir Conaill dies in the habit of a Cistercian at his monastery of Assaroe.
