= 1324 in Ireland =

- Centuries: 12th; 13th; 14th; 15th; 16th
- Decades: 1300s; 1310s; 1320s; 1330s; 1340s
- See also: Other events of 1324; List of years in Ireland

Events from the year 1324 in Ireland.

== Incumbent ==
- Lord: Edward II

== Events ==
- "The same cow-destruction (namely, the Maeldornnaigh) prevailed throughout Ireland."
- Archbishop Ledrede of Ossory accuses Alice Kyteler and her associates of witchcraft and heresy. Alice was the first person in Ireland to be condemned for alleged witchcraft.
- Alexander de Bicknor starts the construction of Tallaght Castle

== Deaths ==
- 12 February – William Liath de Burgh, buried in Galway.
- 3 November – Petronilla de Meath, maidservant, first case in Ireland's history of burning at the stake for the crime of heresy (b. 1300).
