= Braganstown massacre =

Massacre of the de Bermingham family that took place in Braganstown, Ireland

The Braganstown massacre took place on 9 June, 1329 in Braganstown, modern County Louth, Ireland. A mob of angry tenants attacked and killed the local lord, John de Bermingham, and around 160 of his relatives and followers.

== Background ==
Born and raised on de Bermingham lands in modern County Offaly, John de Bermingham, like his father Peter de Bermingham, was a Hiberno-Norman soldier. His military career was highlighted by his battles with the Irish, at a time when the English presence in eastern Ireland was coming under increasing attacks from the Irish.

After campaigns against the Irish of the Slieve Bloom Mountains and his victory over Edward Bruce at the Battle of Faughart in 1318, ending the Bruce Campaign in Ireland, de Bermingham was rewarded with lands in modern County Louth by the Lord Justiciar of Ireland. de Bermingham, like many other Norman lords, used levies of kerns (Irish mercenaries) during conflicts and to defend their lands. However, de Bermingham rarely exercised control over the soldiers, who would often attack, rob or sometimes even murder his tenants.

Another reason de Bermingham was despised by his tenants was that he often brought Irish culture into the area, such as Gaelic harpists and other musicians. At this time, the area was on the frontier with Gaelic Irish Kingdoms (particularly the MacMahons and O'Reillys) and suffered repeated attacks from them, mostly cattle raids, but sometimes resulting in the massacre of civilians. This led to widespread discontent and anger with de Bermingham's lordship.

== Massacre ==
The final straw came on 9 June 1329, in the town of Ardee, when a man by the name of Robert Godeknave, was murdered by two Irish kerns following an argument. The locals, apparently deciding enough was enough, armed themselves and attacked and killed the two mercenaries, who had taken refuge in a church.

The remaining Irish kerns fled to de Bermingham's estates in Braganstown, where they sought the protection of their lord. The mob of tenants marched from Ardee in pursuit and arrived at the gates of de Bermingham's estates. At de Bermingham's manor also were a number of Irish musicians and scholars, and many of his family members.

A later inquisition found that de Bermingham tried to reason or negotiate with the mob, and refused to lock the gates on his own people despite the urgings of the Irish before it was too late. His attempts to reason were in vain and the mob attacked, killing over 160 people. Among the dead was de Bermingham himself, two of his brothers, nine other unspecified relatives, well-known and respected Irish musician and composer, Maol Ruanaidh Cam Ó Cearbhaill, and about twenty of the latter's musical students.

== Aftermath ==
The ringleaders of the mob of tenants, one of whom was John Clinton, father-in-law of Robert Godeknave who had been murdered, soon wrote a letter to the King's court in England describing their version of events. In their account, the mob tried to negotiate with de Bermingham but he attacked, killing several of the tenants, so the mob responded in self-defence. This account was widely published in England and the English public widely accepted the claims of the tenants.

An official inquiry was held, which determined that de Bermingham had in fact tried to negotiate with the mob, but nevertheless, the mob attacked. However, by the time these findings were published in May 1330, the public had already accepted the claims of the tenants, published almost a year earlier, and it was too late to shift their opinion.
