= 1338 in Ireland =

- Centuries: 12th; 13th; 14th; 15th; 16th
- Decades: 1310s; 1320s; 1330s; 1340s; 1350s
- See also: Other events of 1338; List of years in Ireland

Events from the year 1338 in Ireland.

== Incumbent ==
- Lord: Edward III

== Events ==
- Justiciar de Charleton campaigns against the Leinster Irish
- Edmond de Burgh, son of the 2nd Earl of Ulster, is drowned in Lough Mask by his cousins Edmond Albanach de Burgh and his brother Raymond "who fastened a stone to his neck ... The destruction of the English of Connacht, and of his own in particular, resulted from this deed." King Toirdhealbhach of Connacht expels Edmund to western isles of Connacht "after the territories and churches of Iar Connacht (the west of Connacht) had been greatly destroyed between them;" Toirdhelbhach "then assumed the sway of the whole province." Edmund collects a "large fleet of ships and barks ... and he remained for a long time on the islands of the sea."
- Irish attack and expel the Anglo-Irish of Luighne and Corann (County Sligo) and retake their hereditary lands
- Matilda, countess of Ulster, offers to surrender lands in Ulster for others in England
- "Teige, son of Rory, son of Cathal O'Conor (who was usually called Bratach Righin), was taken prisoner by Thomas Magauran, and many of his people were killed. Magauran (i.e. Thomas) afterwards went to the house of O'Conor; but, on his return, the Clann-Murtough, and the Muintir-Eolais, assembled to meet him, and took him prisoner, after having slain many of his people."
- Robert de Henningsberg appointed Lord Chancellor of Ireland

== Deaths ==
- "Hugh an Chletigh, son of Rory O'Conor, was wounded in the rear of his own army, and died in consequence."
- "Dearbhail, daughter of Cathal Mac Murrough, and wife of Donough, son of Hugh Oge, died."
