= 1331 in Ireland =

- Centuries: 12th; 13th; 14th; 15th; 16th
- Decades: 1310s; 1320s; 1330s; 1340s; 1350s
- See also: Other events of 1331; List of years in Ireland

Events from the year 1331 in Ireland.

== Incumbent ==
- Lord: Edward III

== Events ==
- "A hosting by the Connachtmen, both Foreigner and Gaidhel, into Munster, against Mac Conmara. Pledge and sway were gained by them on Mac Conmara. A church was burned by a party of the host, wherein were two score and one hundred persons, both noble and base and two priests were of them and those all were burned."
- "Ten of the people of Donnchadh the Swarthy, son of Mael-Shechlainn Carrach Mac Diarmata, were drowned on Loch-Teiched."
- 21 January – Parliament at Dublin
- 27 February – Anthony de Luci appointed justicier
- 3 March – William de Burgh, Earl of Ulster, appointed lieutenant. Ordinances for Conduct of Irish government includes a decree that there should be one law for Irish and Anglo-Irish, except for betaghs
- 21 April – Irish raid and capture Arklow
- 25 April – Irish raid Tallaght
- Irish raids in County Wexford.
- 1 July – Irish Parliament meets at Dublin
- August Irish raid and capture Ferns
- 16 August – Earl of Desmond captured by Justiciar at Limerick
- Edward III plans expedition to Ireland for 1332
- September Henry de Mandeville arrested
- Walter de Burgh defeats Tommaltach Mac Diarmata in Moylurg
- November Walter de Burgh arrested and imprisoned by the Earl of Ulster

== Births ==
- 4 October – James Butler, 2nd Earl of Ormonde, Lord Justice of Ireland (died 1382).

== Deaths ==
- Tadhg mac Cathal mac Domnall Ua Conchobair rested in Christ
