= Walter de Thornbury =

14th-century English cleric

Walter de Thornbury (died 1313) was an English-born statesman and cleric who held the office of Lord Chancellor of Ireland in the 14th century. His efforts to secure confirmation of his election as Archbishop of Dublin ended in tragedy with his death in a shipwreck.

== Biography ==
Walter de Thornbury was born in Herefordshire, where he was later granted the manor of Wolferlow by the Mortimer family, with whom he was always closely associated. He was an executor of the will of Edmund Mortimer, 2nd Baron Mortimer, and was authorised by Edmund's widow Margaret de Fiennes to act as her attorney (jointly with Adam de Harvington, who like Walter was later to be a senior judge in Ireland) to recover her dowry and other properties which had been held by Edmund. He was appointed guardian to their son Roger Mortimer, 1st Earl of March. Given Roger's later role as the usurper, and probably the killer of King Edward II, it is ironic that Walter owed his rise to power largely to his friendship with the King's favourite Piers Gaveston, who was Roger's co-guardian. He was much at Court in the years 1305–1306.

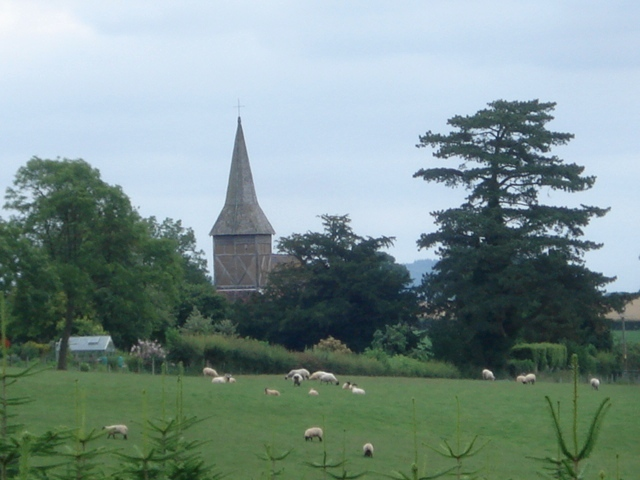
A distant view of Wolferlow Church, present day. The manor of Wolferlow was granted to Walter by the Mortimer family around 1300.

== Irish career ==
Thornbury was sent to Ireland as Chancellor of the Exchequer of Ireland in 1308 and became Lord Chancellor of Ireland the following year, on Piers Gaveston's recommendation, following the death of Thomas Cantock. He was Deputy Treasurer of Ireland in 1311, and was appointed Treasurer and Cantor (Chief Singer) of St. Patrick's Cathedral in the same year, as a mark of royal favour (as the Archbishopric of Dublin was vacant, the Treasurer's office was in the King's gift). He accompanied Gaveston on his successful campaign to restore the Crown's authority in Leinster in 1309, in which he defeated the O'Byrne clan of County Wicklow and restored order in the neighbourhood of Glendalough. The downfall and execution of his patron Gaveston in June 1312 does not seem to have injured Thornbury's career. A letter dating from the period 1309–1312 survives, written by the Justiciar of Ireland to Walter, concerning the goods of a merchant of Cork which had been seized at Dieppe, even though the merchant had previously rendered a service to the French navy.

In 1313, Thornbury was briefly Deputy Justiciar of Ireland. In March, he went on assize with William Alysaundre, the itinerant justice for the county, at Cashel to hear the pleas for County Tipperary. The assize lasted for just eight days, and though the warrant of appointment refers only to civil cases, it dealt with both civil and criminal business. The most notable criminal trial was that of Walter Ohassy for the murder of John de Nash. Walter was found guilty and condemned to be hanged. The same judges held the assizes in Cork City the following August, just before Thornbury set out on his fatal trip to Avignon.

== Death ==
In 1313 he was one of two candidates for the Archbishopric of Dublin, the other being Alexander de Bicknor (William de Rodyard, Dean of St Patrick's Cathedral had also been nominated but had withdrawn his name). Thornbury is said to have had a small majority of the votes, but victory depended on the Pope's approval. Thornbury, seemingly quicker off the mark than his rival, set out for the Papal Court at Avignon to secure papal confirmation of his election. The ship he was travelling on sank in a storm with the loss of all lives on board, "as if Heaven had promulgated its judgment on the election", in the words of a nineteenth-century history. The dead were reported to have numbered more than 130.

== See also ==
- History of Ireland (1169–1536)#Norman decline (1300–1350)
