= 1313 in Ireland =

- Centuries: 12th; 13th; 14th; 15th; 16th
- Decades: 1290s; 1300s; 1310s; 1320s; 1330s
- See also: Other events of 1313; List of years in Ireland

Events from the year 1313 in Ireland.

== Incumbent ==
- Lord: Edward II

== Events ==
- Stephen Riddel appointed Lord Chancellor of Ireland.

== Deaths ==
- Walter de Thornbury, an English-born statesman and cleric who held the office of Lord Chancellor of Ireland; his efforts to secure confirmation of his election as Archbishop of Dublin were cut short by his death in a shipwreck.
