= 1332 in Ireland =

- Centuries: 12th; 13th; 14th; 15th; 16th
- Decades: 1310s; 1320s; 1330s; 1340s; 1350s
- See also: Other events of 1332; List of years in Ireland

Events from the year 1332 in Ireland.

== Incumbent ==
- Lord: Edward III

== Events ==
- "The defeat of Berna-in-mil was inflicted on Tomaltach Mac Diarmata and on Mac William, where were killed many of the people of Mac William by the son of the Earl and Tomaltach Mac Donnchaidh."
- 20 January – 2 May Justicier de Lucy campaigns in Munster, where he captures William and Walter de Bermingham in February (see 11 July)
- 7 April Roger Mortimer's outlawry of Hugh de Lacy queried
- July Bunratty castle captured by King Muirchertach of Thomond and Mac Con Mara
- 4 August Justicer de Lucy ordered to stay execution against magnates imprisoned for felonies; Roger Outlaw commissioned to treat with English and Irish at war with Edward III
- 17 August Parliament at Dublin
- 9 September – 15 November Justicier de Lucy leads expedition to Thomond
- 15 September Edward III's expedition to Ireland abandoned
- 20 September Prisage of wine at ports of Dublin, Drogheda, Limerick and Waterford granted to the Earl of Ormond
- 30 September John Darcy reappointed justicier (see 13 February 1333)
- 3 December Thomas de Burgh acting as deputy justicier
- Richard FitzRalph of Dundalk appointed chancellor of University of Oxford; holds post until 1334

== Deaths ==
- Walter de Burgh starved to death while imprisoned by his cousin the Earl of Ulster
- 11 July William de Bermingham, hung at Dublin
