= Carlingford Abbey =

Dominican abbey in County Louth, Ireland

- Mainistir Chairlinn
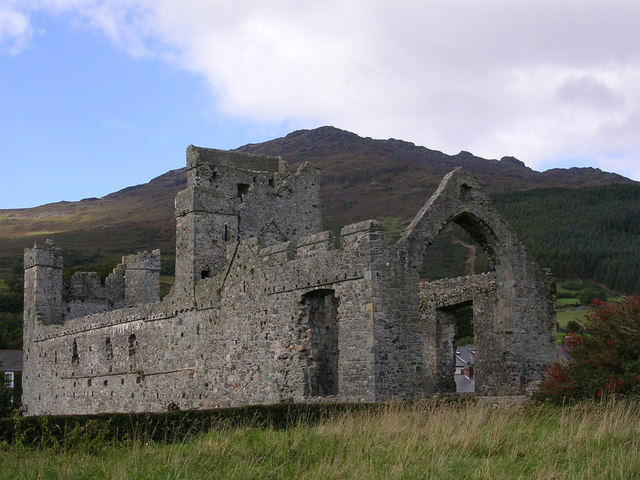

- Location within Ireland
- Interactive map of Carlingford Abbey

Monastery information
- Other name: Carlingford Friary/Priory
- Order: Dominican Order (Order of Preachers)
- Established: 1305
- Disestablished: 1777
- Diocese: Armagh

People
- Founder: Richard Óg de Burgh, 2nd Earl of Ulster

Architecture
- Status: Inactive
- Style: Norman

Site
- Location: Abbey Court, Carlingford, County Louth
- Coordinates: 54.038148°N 6.184459°W
- Visible remains: nave, chancel, bell-tower, domestic buildings, mill
- Public access: yes

Carlingford Abbey, also called Carlingford Friary or Carlingford Priory, is a medieval Dominican abbey and National Monument located in Carlingford, County Louth, Ireland.

== Location ==
Carlingford Abbey is located in the centre of the town, just off Dundalk Street.

== History ==
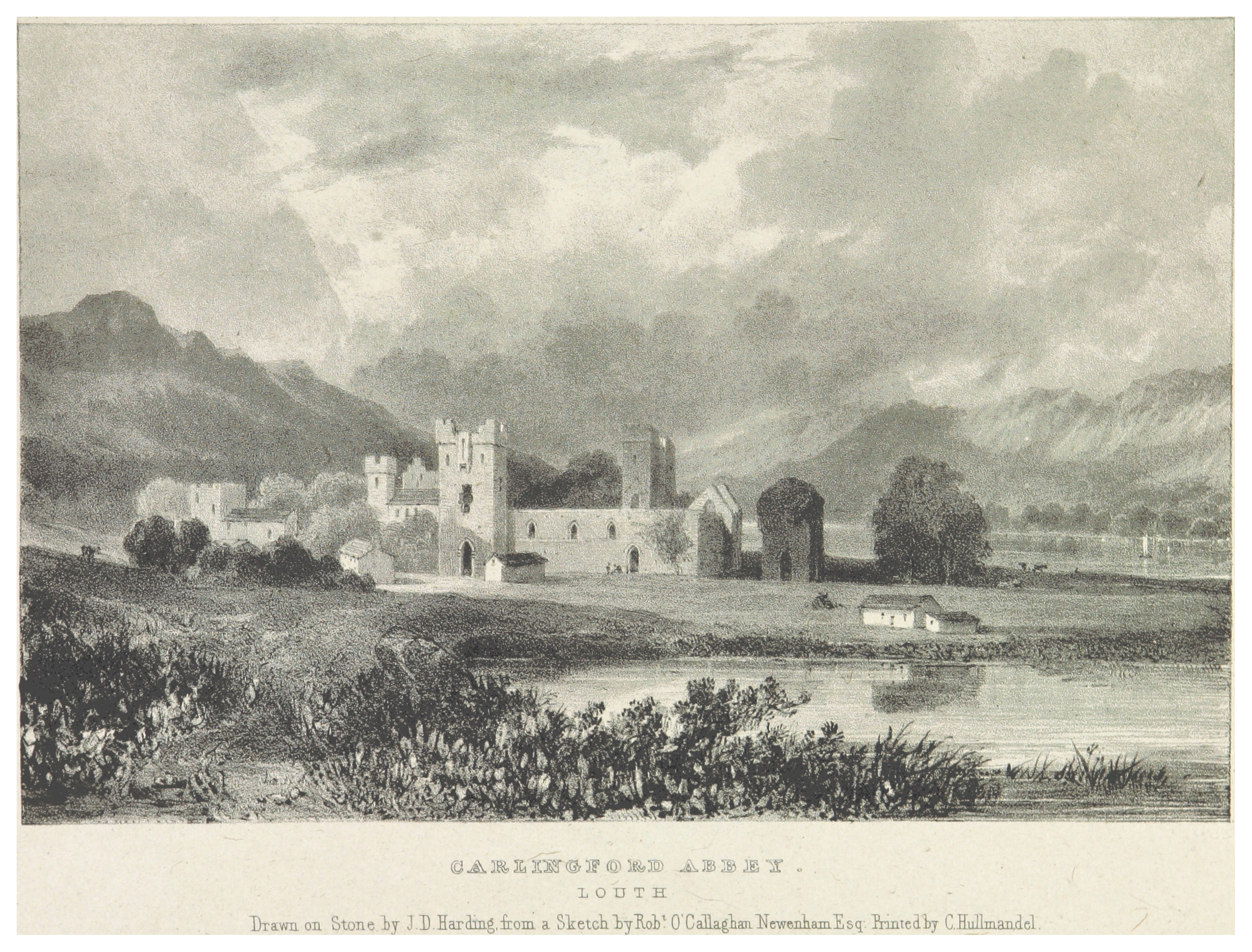
1830 sketch of the abbey

This abbey was founded by the Dominican Order c. 1305 under the patronage of Richard Óg de Burgh, 2nd Earl of Ulster, and dedicated to Saint Malachy (1095–1148). Two towers were added to the northwest and southwest corners of the west gable in 1423, giving the church its fortified appearance. Rebuilding took place in the early 16th century. It remained in use until the Dissolution of the Monasteries. The buildings were then used for a hall, a barracks and a handball alley.

In 1671, under King Charles II, the abbey was to reopen, but ownership was disputed with the Franciscan. Oliver Plunkett, then Catholic Archbishop of Armagh, returned the Abbey to the Dominicans. The Abbey relocated to Dundalk in 1777.

== Buildings ==
Remaining at Carlingford Abbey are the nave, chancel and central bell-tower, built of rough coursed limestone and greywacke. Slightly to the south are the outbuildings and a mill house.

Defensive towers, crenellations and a machicolation were added in the 15th century.

== See also ==
- List of abbeys and priories in Ireland (County Louth)
