= 1310 in Ireland =

- Centuries: 12th; 13th; 14th; 15th; 16th
- Decades: 1290s; 1300s; 1310s; 1320s; 1330s
- See also: Other events of 1310; List of years in Ireland

Events from the year 1310 in Ireland.

== Incumbent ==
- Lord: Edward II

== Events ==
- Áed Bréifnech Ó Conchobair killed by Seónac Mac Uidilín, officer of his mercenaries, at the instigation of Sir William Laith de Burgh.
- Fedlimid mac Áed mac Eógan Ó Conchobhair installed as King of Connacht by Máelruanaid Mac Diarmata (Mac Dermott) at Carnfree with full ancient ceremony
- Ó Ragallaig and Mac Mathgamna campaign in Airgialla
- January–June – trial of Knights Templar in Dublin
- 9 February Parliament at Kilkenny. Law passed against reception of Irishmen as members of Anglo-Irish religious houses
- after 24 March Parliament at Kildare
- Earl of Ulster builds castle at Sligo

== Deaths ==
- Tanaide Mor mac Dúinnín Ó Maolconaire, seanchai (historian) and file (poet).
