= 1337 in Ireland =

- Centuries: 12th; 13th; 14th; 15th; 16th
- Decades: 1310s; 1320s; 1330s; 1340s; 1350s
- See also: Other events of 1337; List of years in Ireland

Events from the year 1337 in Ireland.

== Incumbent ==
- Lord: Edward III

== Events ==
- Peace established between Richard de Burgh and Brian Ban O Briain
- Ruaidhri O Ceallaigh of Uí Maine defeats and captures King Toirdhealbhach of Connacht
- "A peace was concluded between William, son of the Earl of Ulster, and Brian Bún (the Fair) O'Brien; and the lands which O'Brien had taken from the son of the Earl were given back to him at their former rent."
- "A camp was pitched at Athleague by the King of Connaught, to oppose Edmond Burke"
- Following the death of Teige Mac Clancy "Great depredations were afterwards committed in Dartry by O'Conor; and the son of Maurice Mac Clancy was killed while in pursuit of the preys."
- "Teige and Melaghlin, two sons of Ivor Mac Rannall, were taken prisoners by Cathal Mac Rannall. Cathal was afterwards killed by their kinsmen, who, having collected a considerable force, being joined by William Mac Mahon, and by Conor and Tomaltagh, the two other sons of Ivor Mac Rannall, went to rescue the sons of Ivor. Manus O'Farrell was killed by them on the same day. Teige, the son of Ivor Mac Rannall, was then made chieftain."
- "Hugh Reamhar O'Neill made peace with the people of Oriel and Fermanagh."
- Richard FitzRalph arrives at papal court, Avignon (see 1344)
- 3 March – Ordinance by King Edward III of England and council in parliament at Westminster that landholders in Ireland should pay subsidy for defence of their marches
- 24 March – Irishmen enjoying English law granted access to Anglo-Irish religious houses.
- 28 July – John de Charleton de Powys appointed justiciar
- c. September – Richard de Mandeville raids Isle of Man
- 14 October – Justiciar John de Charleton de Powys arrived in Ireland
- Thomas Charlton, Bishop of Hereford appointed Lord Chancellor of Ireland

== Deaths ==
- 6 January – James Butler, 1st Earl of Ormonde.

=== Full date unknown ===
- Lughaidh O'Daly, Bishop of Clonmacnoise, "died after a well-spent life."
- Tomas mac Cormac O'Donnell, Bishop of Raphoe, "a man eminent for wisdom and piety"
- "The Master Professor O'Rothlain."
- John O Fallon, Lord of Clann-Uadagh (barony of Athlone, County Roscommon)
- Teige Mac Clancy, lord of Dartraige, "was slain by Cormac mac Rory mac Donnell O'Conor, as were also numbers of others, in revenge of John, the son of Donnell."
- Donnell Roe O'Malley "and Cormac, his son, were killed on St. Martin's night by Clann-Merrick, and other Englishmen who were along with them."
- Matthew O'Higgin "a man eminent for poetry and humanity, died."
- Henry Mac Martin "was slain."
- Donough mac Murtough More Mageoghegan", Lord of Kinel-Fiachach, was killed by the people of Offaly."
- Donough More O'Dowda, "Tanist of Hy-Fiachrach"
