= 1311 in Ireland =

- Centuries: 12th; 13th; 14th; 15th; 16th
- Decades: 1290s; 1300s; 1310s; 1320s; 1330s
- See also: Other events of 1311; List of years in Ireland

Events from the year 1311 in Ireland.

== Incumbent ==
- Lord: Edward II

== Events ==
- Archbishop de Leche of Dublin received a papal bull from Clement V, authorizing him to establish the University of Dublin
