= 1330 in Ireland =

- Centuries: 12th; 13th; 14th; 15th; 16th
- Decades: 1310s; 1320s; 1330s; 1340s; 1350s
- See also: Other events of 1330; List of years in Ireland

Events from the year 1330 in Ireland.

== Incumbent ==
- Lord: Edward III

== Events ==
- Gilla Isa Ruad O Ragallaig, king of East Breifne, dies; succeeded by his son Risdeard.
- Adam Limberg appointed Lord Chancellor of Ireland

== Deaths ==
- John Butler of Clonamicklon, on 6 January.
