= 1314 in Ireland =

- Centuries: 12th; 13th; 14th; 15th; 16th
- Decades: 1290s; 1300s; 1310s; 1320s; 1330s
- See also: Other events of 1314; List of years in Ireland

Events from the year 1314 in Ireland.

== Incumbent ==
- Lord: Edward II

== Deaths ==
- Geoffrey de Geneville, 1st Baron Geneville (b. c 1229)
