= Battle of Áth an Chip =

1270 battle fought in Ireland

| Date | 1270 |
| Location | "Magh Nissi", at Drumhierney, Leitrim Village, County Leitrim, Ireland 53°59′47″N 8°04′43″W |
| Result | Gaelic Irish victory |

Belligerents
| Kingdom of Connacht | Lordship of Ireland |

Commanders and leaders
| Aedh mac Felim Ua Conchobhair | Robert d'Ufford; Walter de Burgh |

Strength
| Unknown | Unknown |

Casualties and losses
| Unknown | Unknown |
- Location within Ireland

Cath Áth an Chip, meaning the Battle of Ath an Chip, alias the "Battle of Connacht", was fought in 1270 between the Anglo-Irish and the Irish of Connacht in County Leitrim in Ireland. The result was a decisive Irish victory. "Athanchip", then a ford marked by a tree-stump", is today the place called "Battle Bridge". The battle site is probably Drumhierney townland and Leitrim village.

== Background ==
Sixty years after the Norman invasion of Ireland Fedlimid Ó Conchobair became King of Connacht with the assistance of the De Burgh Norman family. At first Fedlimid attempted to arrest the expansion of Norman settlements in Connacht as they set about occupying the kingdom but eventually capitulated to King Henry III and was left a rump kingdom in present-day County Roscommon known as The King's Candreds. His son Aedh did not favour the diplomatic approach or appeasement. Even during his father's reign, Aedh attacked the Normans at every opportunity. In 1249 he ambushed Piers de Bermingham, who at the time held the wardship of the de Burgh lands. This ambush led to all-out war and resulted in Fedlimid being deposed. He regained his throne in 1250 but was much weaker as a result.

== Battle ==
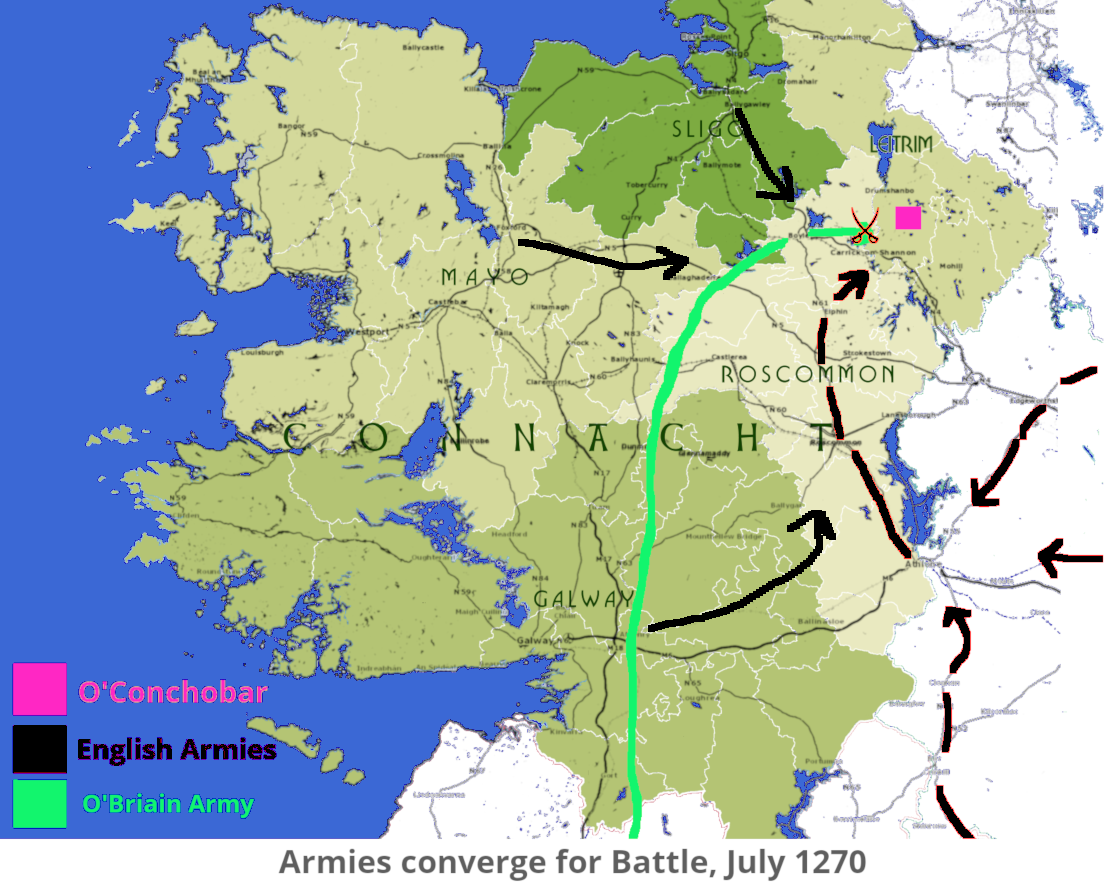
Battle of Áth an Chip

Aedh became king after his father's death in 1265. He continued to raid settled lands in his kingdom. In 1269 Robert d'Ufford, the new justiciar in Ireland, began building a royal castle in Roscommon. D'Ufford sent his deputy across the River Shannon to join his ally, Walter de Burgh, 1st Earl of Ulster. The combined forces met with Aedh to negotiate but to no avail. The forces under de Burgh retreated and attempted to ford the Shannon at Áth-an-Chip. Aedh routed the army and destroyed the castle at Roscommon.

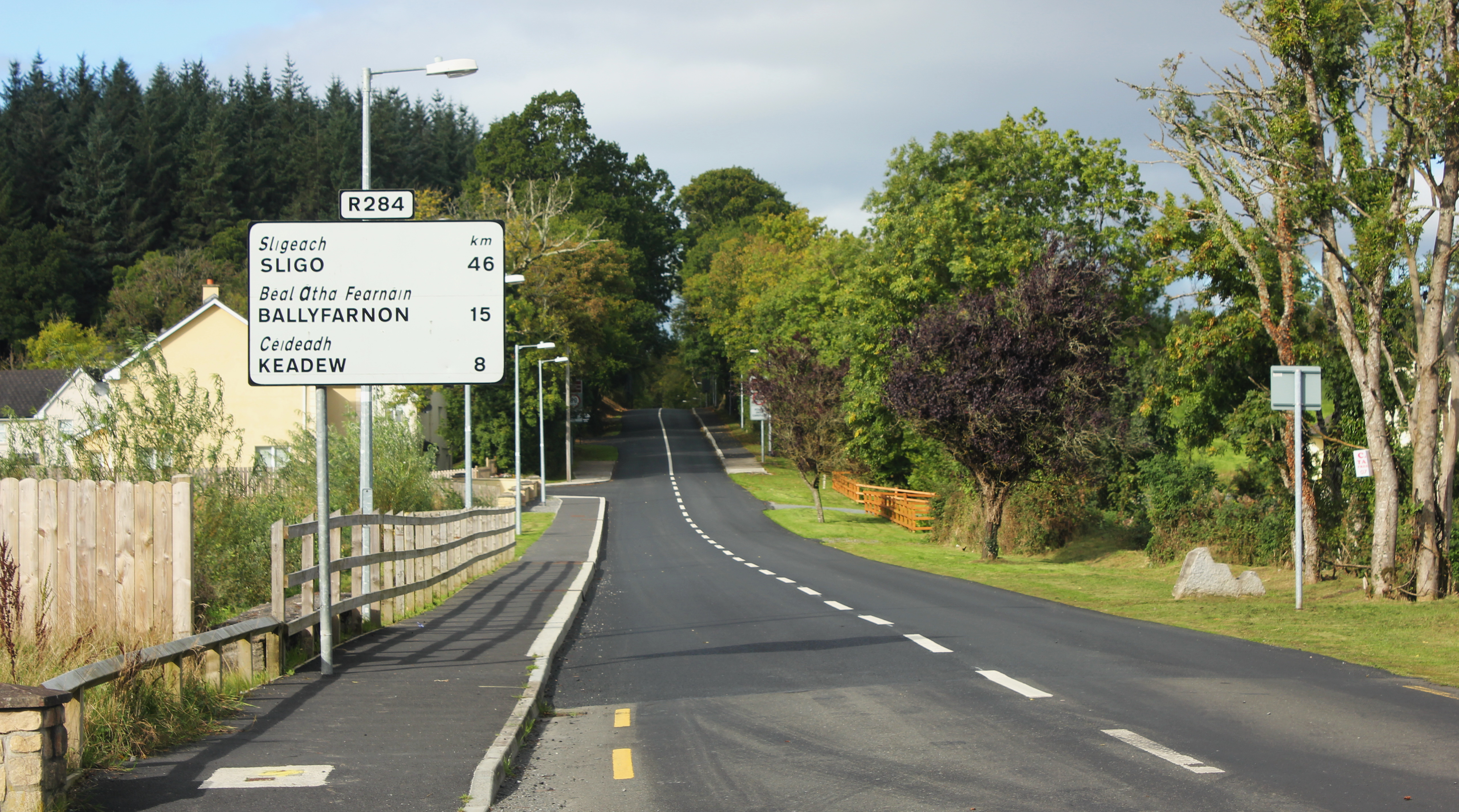
Droim-tiarnaigh ("Drumhierney"): probable "Ath-an-Cip" battle site

The battle occurred at Maigh Nissi (Moynissy, "plain of Nissi"), in the barony of Leitrim, County Leitrim. Connellan states "Moy-Nisse was a district along the Shannon in the county of Leitrim, near Carrick-on-Shannon; and the events here narrated occurred about that place". Moynissy was the Gaelic place name for the flat, unforested part, of the barony of Leitrim, bordering the Shannon.

The Irish Annals describe the Anglo-Normans crossing Ath-Cara-Conaill ("Carrick-on-Shannon") before marching onward to Ath-an-cip. Places corrupted as "Ath an Chip" and all variants were a ford marked by a large tree stump. Ath an Chip was clearly a ford on the River Shannon. MacNamee states "where Ath an Chip was is not certain; to the present writer the evidence would seem to point to Battle Bridge". At Leitrim village the R284 road crosses the Shannon at "Battle-bridge" (Irish: Béal Átha an Chatha, "the ford/mouth of the battle"). The townland at this bridge is Drumhierney (Irish: Droim Thiarnaigh, meaning the ridge of the "master", "lord", or "the domination"). (Note: "Tiarnaigh" means literally Rule (do, over), or dominate. See wikt:tiarnaigh and Tierney.) Without certainty the battle-site was Drumhierney townland in county Leitrim.

== Aftermath ==
The death in Galway of de Burgh in 1271 ended all effective resistance to Aedh's rule in Connacht. Aedh continued to raid as far east as Granard and even burnt Athlone, destroying the bridge there. The raiding came to an end with Aedh's sudden death on 3 May 1274. The Kingdom of Connacht became embroiled in a civil war with thirteen kings during the period between 1274 and 1315. This instability left Connacht vulnerable to Norman settlement.

== See also ==
- Battle of Druim Dearg, 1260AD
- Battle of Ardnocher, 1329AD

== References and notes ==
=== Sources ===
- Connellan, Owen (1846). Philip MacDermott (ed.). The Annals of Ireland, translated from the original Irish of the four masters. O'Clery, Michael, 1575-1643 (electronic resource, Free eBook from the Internet Archive ed.). Dublin: B Geraghty, s. Anglesea street.
- Tobin (2013). "Carrick-on-Shannon Sewerage Improvement Scheme, Environmental Impact Statement: Chapter 4, Material Assets - Cultural Heritage" (PDF) (electronic document ed.). Environmental Impact Agency. pp. 163–197.
- Logainm. "Áth na gCeap".
- Logainm. "Áth Cip".
- Logainm. "Béal Átha an Chatha".
- "Local Place Names - Battlenrodge". Duchas. 1938.
- Logainm. "Droim Thiarnaigh ("Drumhierney")".
- MacNamee, James Joseph (1954). History of the Diocese of Ardagh. Dublin: Browne and Nolan.
