= 1335 in Ireland =

- Centuries: 12th; 13th; 14th; 15th; 16th
- Decades: 1310s; 1320s; 1330s; 1340s; 1350s
- See also: Other events of 1335; List of years in Ireland

Events from the year 1335 in Ireland.

== Incumbent ==
- Lord: Edward III

== Events ==
- "John Ó hEaghra was taken prisoner by the son of the Earl and considerable part of his people were plundered."
- "A foray was made by the sons of Domnall on the Foreigners, namely, on the Clan of Gerald the Merry Mac Maurice Fitz Gerald. A great retaliatory foray was made by the Clann-Maurice on the same sons of Domnall."
- "The West of Connacht was all destroyed by William de Burgh. Persons numerous were killed and preys and burnings and ills innumerable were done by him on the song of the Earl and on the Clanricarde de Burgh. Peace was made between the same de Burghs."
- Parliament (or council): subsidy granted for Edward III's Scottish war.
- The title The Clanricarde, was a Gaelic title meaning "Richard's family", or "(head of) Richard's family" was first recorded.
- Alexander de Bicknor, Primate of Ireland appointed Lord Chancellor of Ireland

== Deaths ==
Gilla na nAingel Ó Caiside, Gaelic-Irish physician
