= 1305 in Ireland =

- Centuries: 12th; 13th; 14th; 15th; 16th
- Decades: 1280s; 1290s; 1300s; 1310s; 1320s
- See also: Other events of 1305; List of years in Ireland

Events from the year 1305 in Ireland.

== Incumbent ==
- Lord: Edward I

== Events ==
- Carlingford Abbey was founded by the Dominican Order
