= 1336 in Ireland =

- Centuries: 12th; 13th; 14th; 15th; 16th
- Decades: 1310s; 1320s; 1330s; 1340s; 1350s
- See also: Other events of 1336; List of years in Ireland

Events from the year 1336 in Ireland.

== Incumbent ==
- Lord: Edward III

== Events ==
- 3 May – ordinances for reform of Irish administration
- after 26 May – Conchobhar mac Tomaltach Mac Diarmada succeeds his father as lord of Moylurg
- 22–23 June – Brian Ban of Thomond burns Tipperary town; Justicier Darcy leads a campaign against him
- 1 July – prohibition against holding of lands by officials in areas where they hold office
- Castlemore Costello in (County Mayo) destroyed by King Toirdhealbhach of Connacht
- The Franciscan order establishes in Carrick on Suir with the granting of land for a friary by the 1st Earl of Ormond
- Surviving portions of the Annals of Nenagh begin

== Deaths ==
- c.26 May Tomaltach Mac Diarmada, lord of Moylurg
