= 1333 in Ireland =

- Centuries: 12th; 13th; 14th; 15th; 16th
- Decades: 1310s; 1320s; 1330s; 1340s; 1350s
- See also: Other events of 1333; List of years in Ireland

Events from the year 1333 in Ireland.

== Incumbent ==
- Lord: Edward III

== Events ==
- Maurice FitzGerald, 1st Earl of Desmond, released
- Conchobhar O Domhnaill succeeds his father, Áed, as King of Tír Conaill
- Ó Ceallaigh of Uí Maine at war with Ó Conchobhair
- Donnchadh mac Aedh Ó Ceallaigh captured and imprisoned by King Toirdhelbach of Connacht
- Friar John Clyn (d. 1349) begins his chronicle, "The Annals of Ireland"
- Clanricarde dynasty established in Connacht

== Deaths ==
- 6 June – William Donn de Burgh, 3rd Earl of Ulster, murdered in the Burke Civil War
- Tomaltach mac Donnchadh Mac Diarmata, lord of Tir Ailella
- King Áed of Tír Conaill; "after taking the habit of a Grey Cistercian monk upon him, died in his own strong hold and was buried in the church of the Monastery of Eassa Ruadh."
- Gilbert Mac Goisdelb "in the centre of his own castle" by Cathal Mac Diarmata Gall
- Aedh Mac Con Shnama
- Domnall Mac Con Shnama, chief of Muinter-Cinaith
- Mac an Ridhre (son of the knight) Mag Fhlannchadha, "material of a chief of Dartraighi, was killed by the Connachtmen."
- Richard Huskard, Norman settler
