= 1312 in Ireland =

- Centuries: 12th; 13th; 14th; 15th; 16th
- Decades: 1290s; 1300s; 1310s; 1320s; 1330s
- See also: Other events of 1312; List of years in Ireland

Events from the year 1312 in Ireland.

== Incumbent ==
- Lord: Edward II

== Events ==
- March: Máel Sechlain Mac Áeda was elected as the Archbishop of Tuam.
- August: Edmund Butler, Earl of Carrick was appointed as the acting Justiciar of Ireland, with the nominal justiciar still being John Wogan.

== Births ==
- 17 September – William Donn de Burgh, Irish noble (died 1333)

== Deaths ==
- Domhnall "An Saithnech" Mág Tighearnán, Chief of McKiernan Clan (birth year unknown)
