= Horseleap =

Horseleap Baile Átha an Urchair
- Village
- Location in Ireland
- Coordinates: 53°23′34″N 7°34′55″W
- Country: Ireland
- Province: Leinster
- County: County Offaly, County Westmeath
- Elevation: 128 m (420 ft)
- Time zone: UTC+0 (WET)
  - Summer (DST): UTC-1 (IST (WEST))
- Irish Grid Reference: N278381

Horseleap (Irish: Baile Átha an Urchair) is a village on the border of County Offaly and County Westmeath in Ireland. It is on the R446 road, formerly the main Dublin to Galway road. Horseleap has a church, primary school, garden centre, pub and petrol station. The village dates back to the 12th century and is steeped in Uí Néill, Geoghegan history.

== History ==
The village's Irish name (Baile Átha an Urchair or Áth an Urchair) was historically anglicised as Ballanurcher, Athnurcher and Ardnurcher. The name probably derives from the legend that Conchobar mac Nessa was killed here.

According to tradition, the English name - Horseleap - originated in an incident in which a member of the De Lacy family was forced to flee on horseback from the Mac Geoghegans. On approaching his castle and discovering that the drawbridge was raised, he jumped the castle's moat on horseback.

The Battle of Ardnocher took place here in 1329 between the forces of Thomas Butler and William Mac Geoghegan. Mac Geoghegan's forces won the battle, and Butler, together with several others of high rank and 140 of his soldiers, was killed.

== Transport ==
The Midland Great Western Railway once maintained a railway station here. Horseleap railway station opened on 1 December 1876, closed to passenger and goods traffic on 27 January 1947 and finally closed altogether on 1 July 1965.

== Horse statue ==
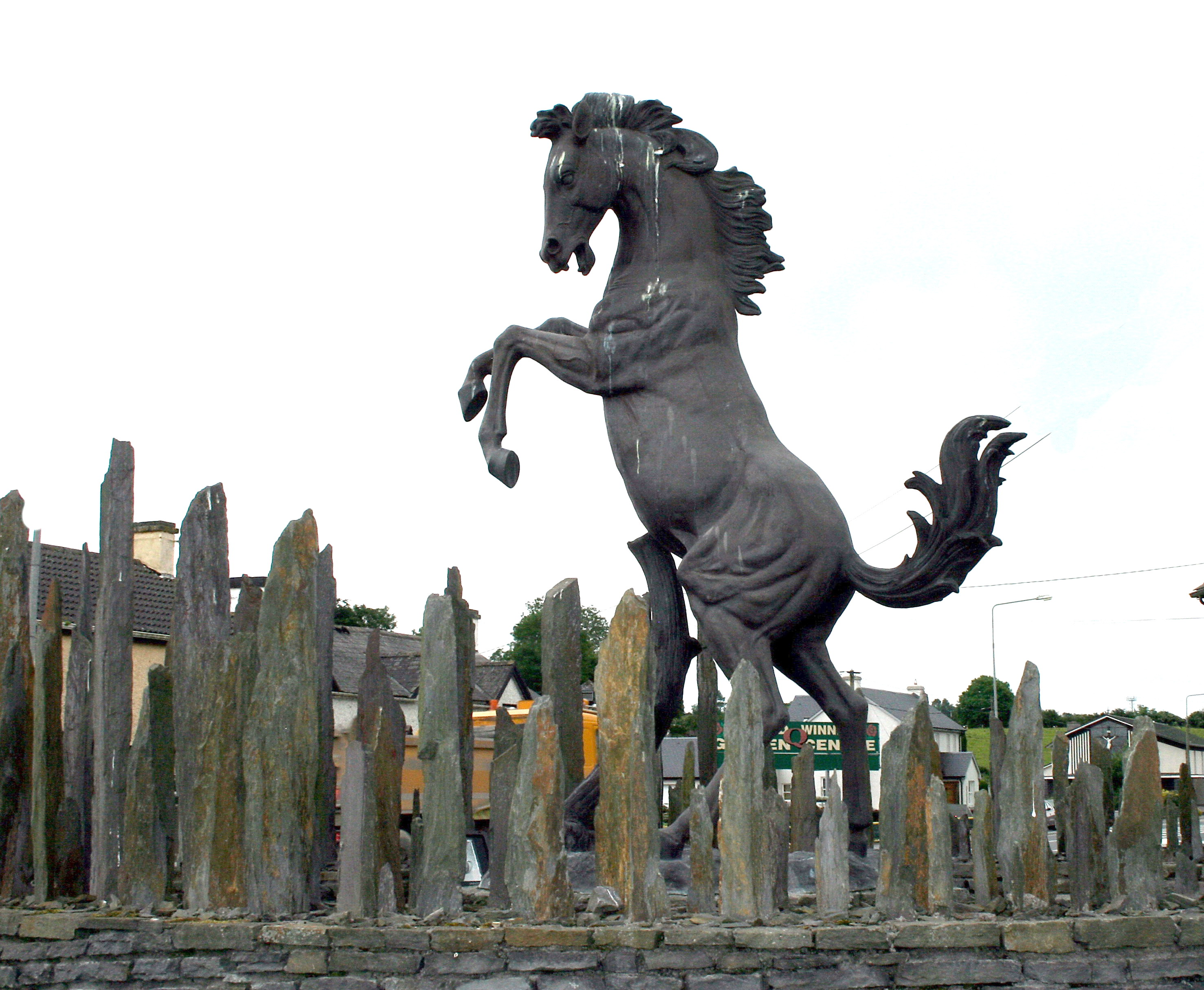
Horse sculpture in Horseleap

A story concerning a bronze statue of a prancing horse on the village green claims that it was commissioned in Italy by the sports car manufacturer, Ferrari, and eventually wound up in Horseleap following a series of misadventures. Journalist Joe Saward identified the tale as an urban myth, pointing out that Ferrari have denied the story.

== See also ==
- List of towns and villages in Ireland.
- Delvin Castle
- Fore Abbey
- Trim Castle
