= Battle of Ardnocher =

1329 battle in Ireland

Date	10 August 1329
Location	near Horseleap, County Westmeath
Result	MacGeoghegan victory

Belligerents
Lordship of Ireland	Clan MacGeoghegan

Commanders and leaders
Thomas Butler †	William MacGeoghegan

Strength
Unknown	Unknown

Casualties and losses
~140 (Hiberniae); ~3,500 (Four Masters)	Unknown

The Battle of Ardnocher or Ardnurcher (Irish: Áth an Urchair) was fought in modern County Westmeath, Ireland on 10 August 1329 between the Hiberno-Normans and the MacGeoghegans of Cenel Fiachaigh or Kenaleagh. The Normans were defeated. The Annales Hiberniae records that on 10 August 1329, Crown forces led by Thomas Butler attacked the fort of Ardnurcher (now the village of Horseleap) but were defeated by William Gallda MacGeoghegan. It says that Butler was killed along with several others of high rank and 140 soldiers. The Annals of the Four Masters offers a different account, giving the date as 1328 and saying that 3,500 Normans were killed.

== See also ==
- Battle of Druim Dearg, 1260AD
- Battle of Ath an Chip, 1270AD
