= Maol Ruanaidh Cam Ó Cearbhaill =

- Born: Cam Ó Cearbhaill
- Died: 10 June 1329

Maol Ruanaidh Cam Ó Cearbhaill, otherwise An Giolla Caoch and Cam Ó Cearbhaill, sometimes anglicised as Cam O'Kayrwill (died 10 June 1329) was a notable Irish harpist and player of the tiompan, murdered with many others at the Braganstown Massacre.

== Origin ==
Ó Cearbhaill appears to have been descended from the Ó Cearbhaill of Airgíalla, a kingdom which once covered Monaghan and Louth. He performed upon the tiompan, and conducted a school teaching the instrument. In his lifetime he appears to have been an especially esteemed musician, one of his obituaries calling him "supreme in his art, mighty in precedence and excellence".

Friar John Clyn (c.1286–c.1349), who later composed a chronicle called The Annals of Ireland, had such particular praise for him that Clyn's editor, Bernadette Williams, believes that the two were known to each other, possibly friends.

Ó Cearbhaill also seems to have known John de Bermingham, 1st Earl of Louth, a member of a well-known Anglo-Irish family which had long been instrumental in the defense of the English control of Ireland. Bermingham had been granted the Earldom of Louth for defeating Prince Edward Bruce at the Battle of Faughart in 1318. He lived in the same part of Ireland as Ó Cearbhaill and would have been regarded as a good patron for him to cultivate.

== Braganstown Massacre ==
Ó Cearbhaill was one of over one hundred and sixty people killed at the Braganstown Massacre on Saturday, 10 June 1329. The killers were local people of Louth who objected to being ruled by an outsider (Bermingham was from Uí Failghe). John Clyn states that "His entire earldom conspired against him, being unwilling that he should rule over them. They took counsel as one, and gathered in a great mass of armed men. Not sparing one of his 'familia', they killed him with his two brothers and around nine of his 'cognomine' and with one hundred and sixty and more."

However, Clyn reserved his grief for Ó Cearbhaill, writing that:

In ista strage et eodem die Cam O'Kayrwill, famosus ille timpanista et cytharista, in arte sea fenix, ca pollens prerogativa et virtute, cum aliis tympanistis disciplulis djus circiter 20 ibidem occubuit. Iste ... vocatus Cam O'Kayrwyll, quia luscus erat nec habebat oculos rectos, sed oblique respiciens, et si non fuerat artis musice cordalis primus inventor, omnium tamen predcessorum et precedentium ipsum, ac contemporaneorum, corrector, doctor et director extitit.

Bernadette Williams translates this as:

And on the same day, in this massacre, Ó Cearbhaill, that famous timpanist and harpist, supreme in his art, mighty in precedence and excellence, lay in the grave in the same place, with about twenty other timpanists, his students. He was called Cam Ó Cearbhaill because he was one-eyed and could not see straight, but looked obliquely; and, if he was not the first inventor of the art of string music, all his predecessors and precursors, he was corrector, scholar and director.

== See also ==
- Clàrsach
- List of unsolved murders (before 1900)
- Music of Ireland
- Origin of the harp in Europe
- Tiompan
