= 1317 in Ireland =

- Centuries: 12th; 13th; 14th; 15th; 16th
- Decades: 1290s; 1300s; 1310s; 1320s; 1330s
- See also: Other events of 1317; List of years in Ireland

Events from the year 1317 in Ireland.

== Incumbent ==
- Lord: Edward II

== Events ==
- Ballymote Castle was captured by the O'Connors of Sligo
- Alexander de Bicknor becomes Archbishop of Dublin
- Remonstrance sent to Pope John XXII amidst the Bruce Campaign
