= 1341 in Ireland =

- Centuries: 12th; 13th; 14th; 15th; 16th
- Decades: 1320s; 1330s; 1340s; 1350s; 1360s
- See also: Other events of 1341; List of years in Ireland

Events from the year 1341 in Ireland.

== Incumbent ==
- Lord: Edward III

== Events ==
- King Toirdhealbhach of Connacht captures Roscommon castle.
- 23 January – Ross loses its rights as an open port.
- 22 February – Alexander Bicknor, Archbishop of Dublin is appointed 'custos and acting justiciar.
- 16 March – John Morice is appointed deputy justiciar.
- 5 May – Elizabeth de Burgh, daughter of William Donn, 4th Earl of Ulster, is betrothed to Lionel of Antwerp, 1st Duke of Clarence (see 9 September).
- 24 July – general resumption of all grants made since the death of Edward I.
- 27 July – ordinance excluding all but Englishmen beneficed in England from holding office in Ireland.
- 2 August – 2 October – deputy justicier campaigns in Leinster against Mac Murchada.
- 9 September – Elizabeth de Burgh and Lionel of Antwerp are married.
- October – parliament at Dublin is adjourned to Kilkenny (held in November). Petitions critical of administration are sent to Edward III.
- 25 November – order for examination of exchequer and its officials.

== Deaths ==
- Richard de Havering (or Richard de Haverings), a medieval Roman Catholic clergyman who briefly became Archbishop of Dublin.
- Roger Utlagh, or Roger Outlawe (b. 1260) was a leading Irish cleric, judge and statesman who held the office of Lord Chancellor of Ireland.
