= Muiris Ó Gibealláin =

Irish jurist, singer, philosopher, poet and musician

Muiris Ó Gibealláin was an Irish jurist, singer, philosopher, poet, and musician, who died in 1328.

Ó Gibealláin was a member of a family originally from Elphin in what is now County Roscommon, who were notable jurists and churchmen in medieval Ireland.

The Annals of Connacht give a lengthy obituary for him, under the year 1328:

Muiris O Gibillain, chief master in Ireland of Law both old and new, Civil and Canon, a learned and erudite philosopher accomplished in poetry and Ogham lore and many other arts, a choral canon at Tuam and at Elphin and at Achonry and at Killala and at Annaghdown and at Clonfert, Official and general judge of the archdiocese, rested in Christ.

The surname is now generally rendered as Giblin, Giblan, or Giblon.
