= Lea Castle =

Ruined castle in County Laois, Ireland

- County Laois, Leinster, Ireland
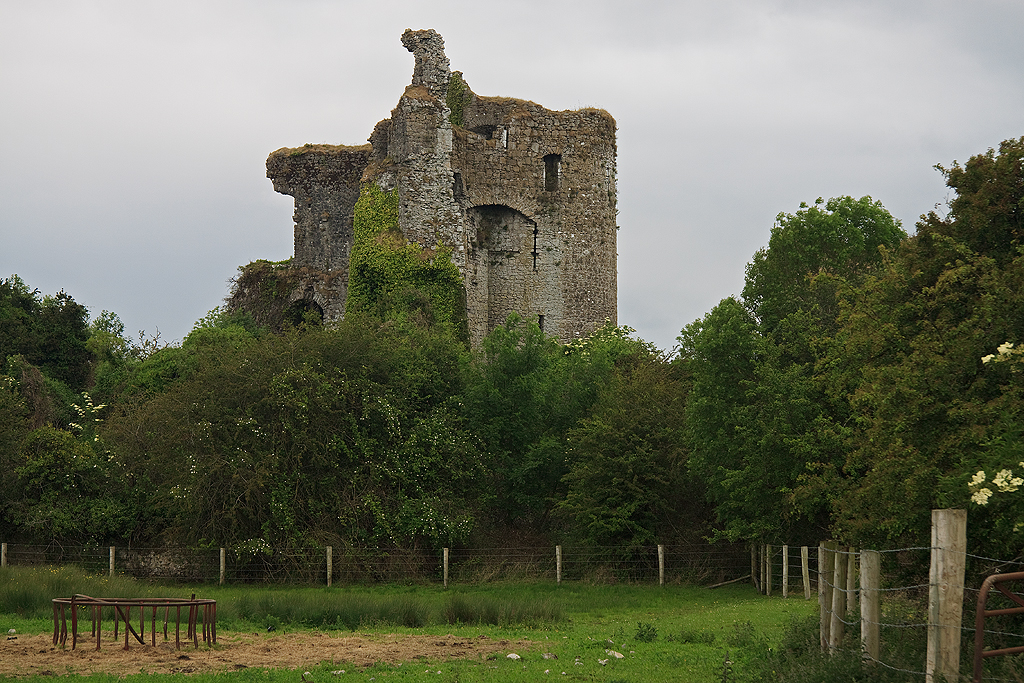

Site information
- Type: motte-and-bailey castle

Location
- Coordinates: 53°09′22″N 7°08′50″W

Lea Castle is a ruined medieval castle near Portarlington, County Laois. The remains of the castle mostly date to the 13th century and consist of a four-storey donjon and a gatehouse.

== Location ==
Lea Castle is on the south bank of the River Barrow. A settlement was established near the castle, but was abandoned in the Late Middle Ages.

== History ==
A timber castle was built in the late 12th or early 13th century and replaced by a later stone castle.

The castle was the property of the FitzGerald family, who held the title Earl of Kildare from 1316. The FitzGeralds in the 1290s clashed fiercely with the powerful Richard de Burgh, 2nd Earl of Ulster, and in 1294–5 they held him prisoner in Lea Castle for several months, until Parliament secured his release. The castle was besieged in 1307. The O'Dempseys captured Lea Castle in February 1330, and Maurice FitzGerald, 1st Earl of Desmond reclaimed it from them.

There was unrest following the death of the justiciar of Ireland in 1346, Ralph de Ufford. In this period Lea was amongst several castles to be destroyed by the O'More, O'Connor Faly, and O'Dempsey families. Lea Castle was again captured in 1452. In 1650 the donjon was partly blown up and then left as a ruin.

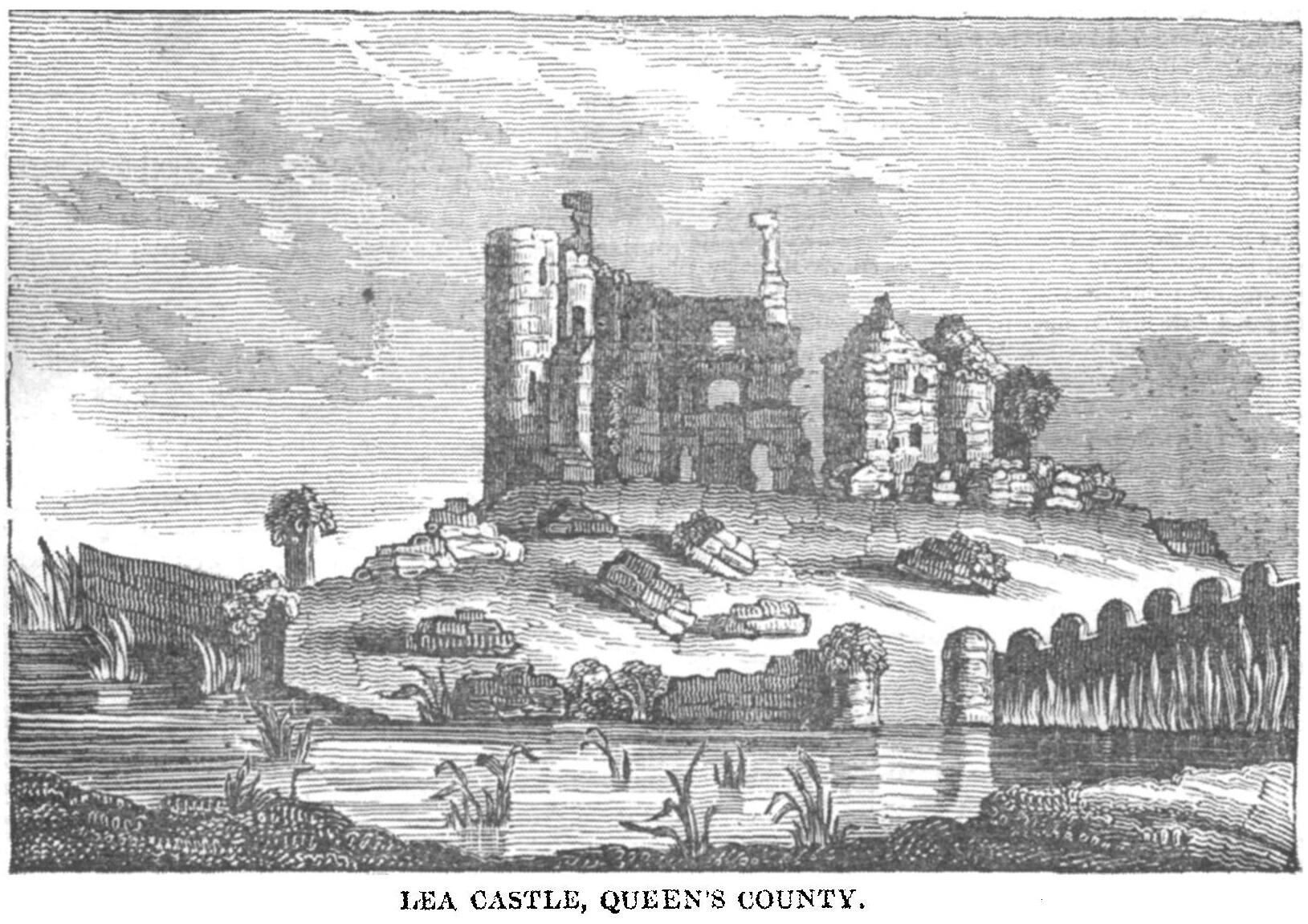
Lea Castle, Queen's County, Dublin Penny Journal, 1835

== Layout ==
Lea Castle consisted of two enclosures: the inner enclosure contains the donjon and was demarcated by a curtain wall that partially survives, while the outer ward extends to the east and has a twin-towered gatehouse.

The core of the donjon is rectangular and rises to four storeys; there is a circular tower at each corner, each rising to five storeys. The north corner tower is the only one that survives at close to its full height. Only the north-west and north-east walls extend to the third floor level as the rest was damaged in the 17th century.

The tower likely had a forebuilding now marked by a small amount of surviving stone. An opening at first floor level has typically been interpreted as the main entrance, but may have been the service entrance rather than a grander access route for the lord and lady of the castle. There is a large opening in the north-east wall at second floor level. Archaeologist Karen Dempsey suggests that this would have provided formal access into the donjon used by the lord and lady perhaps ceremonially. Though it was more common for such towers to be entered at first floor, Dempsey has identified architectural features which may have supported a structure providing access to the tower, such as a wooden bridge.

The second floor contained a chapel in the north tower.

== Bibliography ==
- Dempsey, Karen (2016), "Lea Castle, Co. Laois: the story so far", The Castle Studies Group Journal, 30: 237–252
- Dempsey, Karen (2018), "Lea Castle: looking outwards", Château Gaillard: Études de castellologie médiévale, 28: 113–118
- Leask, H. G. (1936). "Irish Castles: 1180 to 1310". Archaeological Journal. 93: 143–199. doi:10.5284/1068511.
- O'Conor, Kieran (1999), "Anglo-Norman castles in Co. Laois", Laois, History and Society, Geography Publications, pp. 183–212
- Otway-Ruthven, Annette J. (1993) [1968], A History of Medieval Ireland (reprint ed.), New York: Barnes and Noble
