= Robert de Littlebury =

Robert de Littlebury (died 1305) was an English judge whose last years were spent in Ireland. He shared in the general downfall of senior English judges in 1290, but was pardoned soon afterwards.

Foss says that nothing is known of his origins, but Ball states that he was a close relative of Martin of Littlebury (died 1274), the Chief Justice of the Common Pleas.

Robert is first heard of as a Crown servant, and became a tax commissioner in 1279. He became Keeper of the Rolls in the Common Pleas in 1285.

In 1290 King Edward I instituted a purge of most of his senior judges, notably Ralph de Hengham, mostly on the grounds of corruption, although in several cases their guilt or innocence is a matter of dispute. Robert suffered the same disgrace as the rest of the judiciary, although the precise nature of his offence is unknown, and was fined 1000 marks. However, in 1291 he received a pardon for any trespass he had committed in the service of the Crown.

In 1300 he was sent to Ireland as a judge. He became an itinerant justice in County Meath and County Louth . He died in 1305.

== Sources ==
- Ball, F. Elrington The Judges in Ireland 1221-1921 London John Murray 1926
- Foss, Edward The English Judges London Longman Brown Green and Longmans 1851 Vol. III
- Riddell, W.R. (1926) Erring Judges of the Thirteenth Century Michigan Law Review Vol.24
- Prestwich, Michael Edward I University of California Press 1988
