= 1323 =

1323 in various calendars
Gregorian calendar	1323; MCCCXXIII
Ab urbe condita	2076
Armenian calendar	772; ԹՎ ՉՀԲ
Assyrian calendar	6073
Balinese saka calendar	1244–1245
Bengali calendar	729–730
Berber calendar	2273
English Regnal year	16 Edw. 2 – 17 Edw. 2
Buddhist calendar	1867
Burmese calendar	685
Byzantine calendar	6831–6832
Chinese calendar	壬戌年 (Water Dog); 4020 or 3813 — to — 癸亥年 (Water Pig); 4021 or 3814
Coptic calendar	1039–1040
Discordian calendar	2489
Ethiopian calendar	1315–1316
Hebrew calendar	5083–5084
- Hindu calendars
Vikram Samvat	1379–1380
Shaka Samvat	1244–1245
Kali Yuga	4423–4424
Holocene calendar	11323
Igbo calendar	323–324
Iranian calendar	701–702
Islamic calendar	722–723
Japanese calendar	Genkō 3 (元亨３年)
Javanese calendar	1234–1235
Julian calendar	1323; MCCCXXIII
Korean calendar	3656
Minguo calendar	589 before ROC 民前589年
Nanakshahi calendar	−145
Thai solar calendar	1865–1866
Tibetan calendar	ཆུ་ཕོ་ཁྱི་ལོ་ (male Water-Dog); 1449 or 1068 or 296 — to — ཆུ་མོ་ཕག་ལོ་ (female Water-Boar); 1450 or 1069 or 297

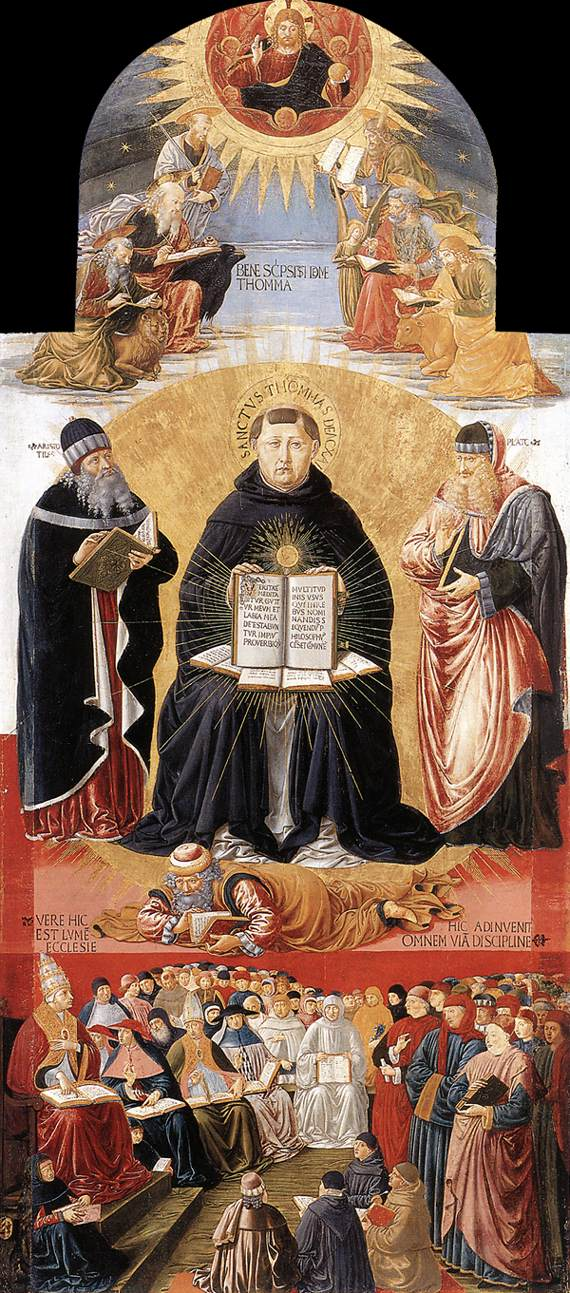
Triumph of St Thomas Aquinas (middle) by Benozzo Gozzoli (1471)

Year 1323 (MCCCXXIII) was a common year starting on Saturday of the Julian calendar.

== Events ==
=== January – March ===
- January 3 – Englishman Andrew Harclay, 1st Earl of Carlisle, who had recently defeated rebel Thomas, 2nd Earl of Lancaster at the Battle of Boroughbridge, commits treason by signing a peace treaty with Scotland's King Robert the Bruce.
- January 14 – On behalf of the Fraticelli order of Spiritual Franciscans, Italian lawyer Bonagrazia of Bergamo issues a protest to Pope John XXII of the December 8 papal bull Ad conditorem canonum. Pope John revises the text of the bull and reissues it, but also punishes Bonagrazia for his insolence by having him imprisoned.
- January 25 – Vilnius, now the capital of Lithuania is first mentioned as a city, when the second of the Letters of Grand Duke Gediminas of the Duchy of Lithuania are sent to German cities inviting German Jews and other Germans to resettle in the city of "Vilna".
- February 20 – Norway's regency council takes a stand against Ingeborg Haakonsdater, mother of and regent for the 7-year-old King Magnus VII. Ingeborg is removed from her position as chief regent on charges of misuse of her power.
- February 25 – The Earl of Carlisle is arrested at Carlisle Castle by the Castle's warden, Anthony de Lucy, on charges of treason and turned over to the custody of King Edward II of England.
- March 3 – The Earl of Carlisle is tried and convicted for treason, then executed later in the day. Carlisle is hanged, drawn and quartered, and parts of his body are sent to various sites in England for public display.
- March 6 – Treaty of Paris: Count Louis I relinquishes Flemish claims over the County of Zeeland. He acknowledges William II the Good as count of Avesnes, Holland, and Zeeland as a state within the Holy Roman Empire. William occupies most of the Bishopric of Utrecht and tries to conquer Friesland (or Frisia) but is repelled by Governor Hessel Martena.
- March 13 – Siege of Warangal: Sultan Ghiyath al-Din Tughluq sends an expeditionary army led by his son, Muhammad bin Tughluq, to the Kakatiya capital Warangal – after ruler Prataparudra has refused to make tribute payments. He besieges the city and finally, after a campaign of 8 months, Prataparudra surrenders on November 9.

=== April – June ===
- April 11 – Hugh II, the self-styled King of Arborea (on the Italian island of Sardinia, with a capital at Oristano, becomes a vassal of Spain's King James II of Aragon in exchange for maintenance of the dynastic rights over his Judicate, and begins a war on the Italian mainland against the Republic of Pisa, winning a battle at Villanovaforru.
- April 23 – Elizabeth of Carinthia marries Peter, Crown Prince of Sicily, co-ruler (with his father Frederick II) of the Kingdom of Sicily.
- April 25 – Nicolò Pistorino becomes the new Grand Chancellor of the Republic of Venice, succeeding Jacopo Bertoldi, who held the office for almost nine years.
- May 15 – Marie of Luxembourg is formally crowned as Queen consort of France at Sainte-Chapelle after her September 21 marriage to King Charles IV.
- May 21 – The German ruler Henry II, Lord of Mecklenburg, signs a peace treaty with King Christopher II of Denmark confirming his conquest of the Lordship of Rostock.
- May 26 – Gediminas, Grand Duke of Lithuania, sends his third, fourth and fifth letters to German cities to advocate that residents relocate to his the Duchy of Lithuania.
- May 30 – King Edward II of England makes a 13-year truce with Scotland at York. Despite the truce, Edward refuses to accept Robert the Bruce as ruler of an independent Scottish kingdom.
- May 31 – Zhao Xian, who had been the Song dynasty Emperor of China from 1274 to 1276, commits suicide as an alternative to being executed, after being viewed as a threat by the Yuan dynasty Mongol Emperor Yingzong.
- June 11 – Bertrand du Pouget, French papal legate, commanding a military campaign against the Ghibellines besieges Milan – but abandons the siege when Louis IV of Bavaria, King of the Romans, sends a relief army to Italy to aid the city and to protect his domains against the Kingdom of Naples, which is together with France the strongest ally of the Papal States.
- June 28 – Siege of Villa di Chiesa: Aragonese forces under Prince Alfonso IV the Kind begin the siege at Villa di Chiesa. The fortified town is founded by Count Ugolino della Gherardesca, but is now under the control of the Republic of Pisa. Alfonso attacks the town with some 1,000 men and several siege engines, while the citizens are starved to death.

=== July – September ===
- July 18 – Thomas Aquinas, Italian priest and theologian, is canonized by Pope John XXII at the Avignon Cathedral and canonized as a saint.
- August 12 – Treaty of Nöteborg: Sweden signs a peace treaty with the Novgorod Republic, regulating the border (known as Finland today) for the first time. The treaty is negotiated with the help of the Hanseatic League in order to conclude the conflict over the control of the Gulf of Finland during the Swedish-Novgorodian Wars.
- September 4 – Gegeen Khan, the Mongol Emperor Yingzong of China is assassinated in a coup d'etat on orders of Yesün Temür, who becomes the new Emperor
- September 28 – In southern Burma (now Myanmar), Saw Zein becomes the new monarch of the Hanthawaddy kingdom (or Martaban) upon the death of his older brother, Saw O.

=== October – December ===
- October 8 – John XXII claims the right to confirm imperial elections and demands that Louis IV of Bavarian surrender his claim to be King of the Romans.
- October 15 – Hostilities that will lead to the War of Saint-Sardos between England and France begin when King Charles IV of France has a royal sergeant place a stake claiming to claim the French town of Saint-Sardos, territory within the jurisdiction of King Edward II of England (who is also the ruler of the Duchy of Aquitaine in southeastern France).
- October 16 – Lord Raymond-Bernard, of the Aquitaine town of Montpezat, burns the village of Saint-Sardos to the ground and hangs the French royal sergeant who acted as agent for King Charles IV. France's government blames the England's Baron Basset of the Duchy of Gascony, for hiring Lord Raymond-Bernard.
- November 12 – Pope John XXII issues the papal bull Cum inter nonnullos as an addendum to the December 8 bull Ad conditorem canonum, declaring that the assertion of the Fraticelli that Christ and the Apostles possessed no property (and advocated poverty as a Christian virtue) is a heresy.
- November – Flemish Revolt: A uprising in Flanders is caused by both excessive taxation levied by Louis I, and by his pro-French policies. The revolt is led by landowning farmers under Nicolaas Zannekin. Members of the local gentry join and William Deken, mayor of Bruges, becomes the leader of the revolt.
- December 7 – John of Nottingham and Robert of Coventry, two Englishmen believed by Coventry residents to be expert on necromancy, begin the process of casting a spell to kill King Edward II, Sir Hugh le Despenser of Winchester, as well as the prior of Coventry. John allegedly accepted 20 pounds sterling, and starts his necromancy by making wax figurines of the targets of elimination and then using them for the next six months. The two men will later be prosecuted for sorcery after one of the designated victims allegedly dies after a pin is driven into his figurine.
- December 21 – In further retaliation by the King Charles of France against King Edward of England for the Saint-Sardos incident, Edward's chief advocate in France's parliament, Pons Tournemire, is arrested and imprisoned in the Grand Châtelet.

== Deaths ==
- January 18 – Catherine of Austria, German noblewoman (b. 1295)
- March 3 – Andrew Harclay, English nobleman and knight (b. 1270)
- March 25 – Mary of Hungary, Hungarian princess and queen (b. 1257)
- April 13 – Joan of Lusignan, French noblewoman and ruler (b. 1260)
- June 11 – Berengar Fredol the Elder, French cardinal and writer
- June 19 – Mechthild of Nassau, German noblewoman and princess
- July 14 – Ralph Greystoke, English nobleman and knight (b. 1299)
- August 2 – Hōjō Nobutoki, Japanese nobleman and regent (b. 1238)
- August 3 – Augustin Kažotić, Croatian prelate and bishop (b. 1260)
- September 4 – Gegeen Khan, Emperor Yingzong of China and Mongol ruler (b. 1302)
- September 22 – Kosmas the Zographite, Bulgarian monk and saint
- October 11 – Henry II the Younger, German nobleman (b. 1292)
- October 16 – Amadeus V, Savoyan nobleman and regent (b. 1252)
- October 28 – John Grey, English nobleman, knight and politician
- November 16 – Frederick the Brave, German nobleman (b. 1257)
- date unknown
  - Benvenuto Campesani, Italian poet, notary and writer (b. 1250)
  - Bernhard II, German nobleman and prince (House of Ascania)
  - Blanche of France, French princess (House of Capet) (b. 1253)
  - Enrique Enríquez the Elder, Castilian nobleman (b. 1246)
  - George II, Bulgarian nobleman and co-ruler (House of Terter)
  - Gerhard IV, German nobleman, knight and co-ruler (b. 1277)
  - Giorgi I, Georgian nobleman and co-ruler (House of Dadiani)
  - Gong of Song, Chinese emperor (House of Zhao) (b. 1271)
  - Guy Ferre the Younger, English nobleman and seneschal
  - Henry III, German nobleman and co-ruler (House of Gorizia)
  - Hervaeus Natalis, French scholar and theologian (b. 1260)
  - Ibn Adjurrum, Moroccan scholar and grammarian (b. 1273)
  - Ibn al-Fuwati, Persian librarian, historian and writer (b. 1244)
  - Isabella of Burgundy, queen consort of Germany (b. 1270)
  - Joan of Taranto, queen consort of Cilician Armenia (b. 1297)
  - John of Monmouth, English bishop and chancellor (b. 1270)
  - Maria dalle Carceri, Italian noblewoman (House of Cornaro)
  - Nicholas Orsini, Italian nobleman, count palatine and ruler
  - Niklot I, Count of Schwerin, German nobleman and ruler (b. 1250)
  - Nisshō, Japanese Buddhist disciple and teacher (b. 1221)
  - Zhongfeng Mingben, Chinese Buddhist master (b. 1263)
