= McKiernan =

McKiernan is a surname. Notable people with the surname include:

- Andrew J. McKiernan (born 1970, Sydney, Australia), Australian speculative fiction writer and Illustrator
- Brian Mág Tighearnán (anglicised Brian McKiernan) was chief of the McKiernan Clan of Tullyhunco, County Cavan from 1358 until 1362
- Catherina McKiernan (born 1969), Irish long-distance runner
- Conchobar ‘Buidhe’ Mág Tighearnán (anglicised Conor ‘The Tawny’ McKiernan) was chief of the McKiernan Clan of Tullyhunco, County Cavan from 1312 until 1314
- Cú Connacht Mág Tighearnán (anglicised Constantine McKiernan) was chief of the McKiernan Clan of Tullyhunco, County Cavan from 1383 until his death in 1412
- David D. McKiernan (born 1950), United States Army four-star general and Commander ISAF and USFOR-A
- Dennis McKiernan (born 1932), American fantasy writer best known for The Iron Tower
- Domhnall ’An Saithnech’ Mág Tighearnán (anglicised Donal McKiernan of Saitne) was chief of the McKiernan Clan of Tullyhunco, County Cavan from 1311 until 1312
- Douglas Mackiernan the first officer of the Central Intelligence Agency (CIA) to be killed in the line of duty.
- Duarcán Mág Tighearnán, the Second (anglicised Durcan McKiernan) was chief of the McKiernan Clan of Tullyhunco, County Cavan from 1279 until his death in 1290
- Eoin McKiernan (1915–2004), early Irish Studies scholar and founder of Irish American Cultural Institute
- Fergal Mág Tighearnán the First, (anglicised Fergal McKiernan) was chief of the McKiernan Clan of Tullyhunco, County Cavan from 1362 until his death in 1383
- Fergal Mág Tighearnán, the Second, (anglicised Fergal McKiernan) was chief of the McKiernan Clan of Tullyhunco, County Cavan from 1512 until his death in 1523
- Fergal Mág Tighearnán, the Third, (anglicised Fergal McKiernan) was chief of the McKiernan Clan of Tullyhunco, County Cavan until his death in 1588
- Gíolla Íosa Mór Mág Tighearnán (d. 1279), (anglicised ‘Big’ Gilleese McKiernan), was chief of the McKiernan Clan of Tullyhunco, County Cavan from c.1269 until his death in 1279
- Íomhaor Mág Tighearnán, the Second, (anglicised Ivor McKiernan), was chief of the McKiernan Clan of Tullyhunco, County Cavan from 1258 until his death c.1269.
- Jim McKiernan (1944–2018), Irish-born Australian politician
- John Mág Tighearnán the First, (anglicised John McKiernan) was chief of the McKiernan Clan of Tullyhunco, County Cavan until his death in 1499
- John Mág Tighearnán, the Second, (anglicised John McKiernan) was chief of the McKiernan Clan of Tullyhunco, County Cavan including the period 1641 to 1657
- John S. McKiernan (1911–1997), American Democratic politician and Lieutenant Governor and Governor of Rhode Island
- Kevin McKiernan (born 1944), veteran foreign correspondent and documentary filmmaker
- Macraith Mág Tighearnán (d.1258), (anglicised Magrath McKiernan), was chief of the McKiernan Clan of Tullyhunco, County Cavan from c.1240 until his death in 1258.
- Matha Mág Tighearnán (anglicised Matthew McKiernan) was chief of the McKiernan Clan of Tullyhunco, County Cavan from 1290 until 1311
- Michael McKiernan, rugby league footballer
- Sithric ‘Carrach-in-Cairn’ Mág Tighearnán (anglicised Sitric ‘the Scabbed of Carn’ McKiernan) was chief of the McKiernan Clan of Tullyhunco, County Cavan in the year 1290
- Tadhg Mág Tighearnán (anglicised Teigue McKiernan) was chief of the McKiernan Clan of Tullyhunco, County Cavan until his death in 1474
- Tawnia McKiernan, American television director
- Tomás Mág Tighearnán (anglicised Thomas McKiernan) was chief of the McKiernan Clan of Tullyhunco, County Cavan from 1314 until his death in 1358
- William Mág Tighearnán (anglicised William McKiernan) was chief of the McKiernan Clan of Tullyhunco, County Cavan from 1499 until his death in 1512

== See also ==
- McKiernan Clan
- McKernan (surname)
- McTiernan
- McTernan
- Kiernan
- Kernan (disambiguation)
- Tiernan
