= Fergal mac Gíolla Íosa Óg Mág Tighearnán =

Fergal mac Gíolla Íosa Óg Mág Tighearnán (anglicised Fergal McKiernan) was head of the lineage of McKiernan Clan of Tullyhunco, County Cavan from 1512 until his death in 1523.

== Ancestry ==
Fergal was the son of Gíolla Íosa Óg Mág Tighearnán, son of Gíolla Íosa Mág Tighearnán (d.1424), son of Brian Mág Tighearnán (d.1362), son of Matha Mág Tighearnán (d.1311), son of Gíolla Íosa 'Leith' Mág Tighearnán, son of Sithric ‘Carrach-in-Cairn’ Mág Tighearnán (d.1290), son of Duarcán Mág Tighearnán, the Second (d.1290), son of Íomhaor Mág Tighearnán, the Second (died c.1269), son of Tighearnán, son of Duarcán the First, son of Íomhaor the First, son of Gíolla Chríost, son of Amhlaoibh, son of Tighearnán, the founder of the clan. Fergal's brother succeeded him as chief of the clan on his death.

== Ceann Fine ==
On the death of the previous Ceann fine ('head of the lineage'), William Mág Tighearnán in 1512, Fergal took over and resided in the castle of Cruachan Ua Cúbhrán, now in the townland of Coolnashinny, besides the modern town of Killeshandra.

== Description ==
According to his death eulogy, Fergal was a charitable and humane man.

== Death ==
Fergal died in 1523 at his castle in Croaghan.

The Annals of the Four Masters for 1523 state-

Mac Tiernan (Farrell, the son of Gilla-Isa Oge, son of Gilla-Isa, son of Brian), Lord of Teallach-Dunchadha, a charitable and humane man, died; and his brother assumed his place.

The Annals of Connacht for the year 1523 state-

Mag Tigernain, Fergal son of Gilla Isa Oc son of Gilla Isa son of Brian, chieftain of Tullyhuncoe, a charitable humane man, died at his own residence and his brother succeeded him.

The Annals of Loch Cé for the year 1523 state-

Mac Tighernain, i.e. Ferghal, son of Gilla-Isa Og, son of Gilla-Isa, son of Brian, dux of Tellach-Dunchadha, a charitable, humane man, died in his own town; and his brother assumed his place after him.

Preceded by William Mág Tighearnán	Chief of McKiernan Clan; 1512–1523 AD	Succeeded by Fergal Mág Tighearnán, the Third
