= Cú Connacht Mág Tighearnán =

Cú Connacht Mág Tighearnán (anglicised Constantine McKiernan) was chief of the McKiernan Clan of Tullyhunco, County Cavan from 1383 until his death in 1412.

== Ancestry ==
Cú Connacht was the son of Tomás Mág Tighearnán, son of Gíolla Íosa 'Leith' Mág Tighearnán, son of Sithric ‘Carrach-in-Cairn’ Mág Tighearnán (d.1290), son of Duarcán Mág Tighearnán, the Second (d.1290), son of Íomhaor Mág Tighearnán, the Second (died c.1269), son of Tighearnán, son of Duarcán the First, son of Íomhaor the First, son of Gíolla Chríost, son of Amhlaoibh, son of Tighearnán, the founder of the clan. His father Tomás Mág Tighearnán had been a previous chief of the clan. Cú Connacht's brothers were Fergal Mág Tighearnán whom he succeeded as chief of the clan, Domhnall and Mahon.

== Chieftainship ==
On the death of the previous chief, his brother Fergal Mág Tighearnán in 1383, Cú Connacht took the chieftaincy and resided in the castle of Croaghan of the Cups (Irish- Cruachan O'Cúbhrán), now in the townland of Coolnashinny, besides the modern town of Killeshandra.

In 1390 the McKiernans and their allies the Clan Muircheartaigh Uí Conchobhair entered into a conflict with the O’Rourke clan.

The Annals of Loch Cé for 1390 state-

A great war between O'Ruairc and O'Raighilligh; and the people of Anghaile, and Muinter-Eolais, the Tellach-Dunchadha, and the Clann-Muirchertaigh come to join in that war, under the direction of Domhnall, the son of Muirchertach, and of Tomaltach Mac Donnchaidh. The Clann-Muirchertaigh and Tellach-Dunchadha emigrated despite Muinter-Ruairc, towards Fidh-na-finnoige, Sliabh-Corran, and Cenel-Luachain; and O'Ruairc obtained intelligence of this whilst he was in Glenn-Gaibhle; and he brought his bands to the upper part of Cenel-Luachain; and a brave, destructive assault was made by O'Ruairc on these royal divisions, who were routed; and the killing of their flocks continued from Bel-atha-doire-Dubhthaigh to the summit of the Breifnian hills.

The Annals of Connacht for 1390 state-

A great war between O Ruairc and O Raigillig. The Muinter Angaile, Muinter Eolais, Tellach Dunchada and Clann Muirchertaig, instructed by Domnall son of Muirchertach [O Conchobair] and Tomaltach Mac Donnchada, entered Connacht. The Clan Murtagh and Tellach Dunchada made a forcible migration into the country of the Muinter Ruairc towards Fid O Finnoice, Sliab Corrain and Cenel Luachain. O Ruairc got word of this in Glengavlin. He conveyed his trains to the upper end of Cenel Luachain and made a fierce and victorious attack on those allied princes and routed them, and kept on slaughtering their cattle from Bel Atha Daire Dubthaig to the top of the Brefne hills.

The Annals of Ulster for 1390 state-

Great war this year between Tigernan Ruairc, namely, king of Breifni and Thomas, son of Mathgamain Ua Raighillaigh, namely, king of Muinter-Mailmordha. And Maghnus Ua Ruairc was at that time in custody with Ua Raghallaigh in the Rock of Loch-Uachtair. The Rock was pierced through and he escaped thereout and went to the castle of Loch-in-scuir and the clan of Muircertaigh Ua Concobuir followed him and he was killed by them in leaving the Loch. Ua Ruairc pursued the clan of Muircertach into Tellach-Dunchadha and they and the Tellach-Dunchadha were defeated, had the prey wrested from them and were pursued from the Ford of Daire-Dubain to Sliabh-Cairbri.

The Annals of the Four Masters for 1390 state-

A great war broke out between O'Rourke and O'Reilly; and the people of Annaly the O'Farrells, the Muintir-Eolais the Mac Rannalls; and the Clann-Murtough O'Conor, at the instigation of Donnell, the son of Murtough, and Tomaltagh Mac Donough, came to join in that war. Manus O'Rourke, who had been imprisoned by O'Reilly in the castle of Lough Oughter, made his escape from it, and went to the castle of Lough-an Scuir; but the Clann-Murtough, being informed of this by his betrayers, they slew him as he was coming ashore out of a cot. A peace was concluded between O'Rourke and O'Reilly; and O'Reilly received great rewards for banishing and expelling from him the enemies of O'Rourke. Owen O'Rourke and the son of Cathal Reagh were delivered up as hostages for the payment of these considerations. The Clann-Murtough and Teallach Dunchadha emigrated, in spite of the O'Rourkes, into Fidh-ua-Finnoige, Slieve-Corrain, and Kinel-Luachain. But as soon as O'Rourke, who was at that time in Glenn-Gaibhle, received notice of this, he took his scouts with him to the upper part of Kinel-Luachain, where he made an attack on them, and forced them to fly before him, killing both cattle and people on their route from Beal-atha Doire-Dubhain to the summit of the Breifnian hills.

The Annals of Clonmacnoise for 1390 state-

There was great dissentions between o'Roirck, o'Relly & the o'fferalls, the MaGranells; Tomaltagh m'Donnogh and the sonnes of Alurtagh came to Conaught upon heareing of the said warres, by the procurement of Donell mcMurtagh and Donell mcDonogh. Magnus o'Roirck remayned prisoner with o'Relly in the Island of Loghoghter, from whence he went to the castle of Loghskwyre, where being betrayed to the sonns of Murtagh, they killed him as hee was leaving the Coytt. o'Roirck and o'Reilye came to certaine articles of agreement, and at last peace was firmly concluded between them, but before this peace was thoroughly concluded o'Roirck gave great guifts to o'Relly for consenting to theese agreements and for banishing his enemies from out of his territoryes; for performance of these articles Owen o'Roirck m'Cahall Reagh was given as a faithfull pledge. The sons of Murtagh and Teallagh Donogh with theire forces made an Inrode upon o'Roirck at a place called ffie fBnoigh; and the Mount called Sliew Corrann and Keann-Kwachar. O'Roirck hearing thereof being at ffye Gaiule, brought his preyes and people with him to a place called Barre and from thence he assaulted the said parties his adversaries, ouerthrew them, killed many of their people and Cattle, and held on his course of killing them from Belagh Derg to the top of the place called Tullagh Brefnagh;

On 14 April 1405 his first cousin once removed died- Áine, daughter of a previous chief Brian Mág Tighearnán.

The Annals of Loch Cé for 1405 state-

Aine, daughter of Brian Mac Tighernain, quievit xviii. kalendas Maii.

The Annals of Connacht for 1405 state-

Aine daughter of Brian Mag Tigernain rested on the fourteenth of April.

In 1411 his first cousin once removed died- Mael Sechlann, Tánaiste of the clan and the son of a previous chief Brian Mág Tighearnán

The Annals of Ulster for 1411 state-

Mail-Shechlainn, son of Brian Mag Tigernain, died this year: to wit, one who was to be chief of Tellach-Dunchadha.

The Annals of the Four Masters for 1411 state-

Melaghlin, the son of Brian Mac Tiernan, Tanist of Teallach Dunchadha, died.

The Annals of Loch Cé for 1409 state-

Maelsechlainn, son of Brian MacTighernain, mortuus est in hoc anno.

The Annals of Connacht for 1409 state-

Maelsechlainn son of Brian Mag Tigernain died this year.

== Death ==
Cú Connacht was murdered in his castle in 1412 by the Maguire clan of Fermanagh.

The Annals of Ulster for 1412 state-

Cu-Connacht Mag Tignernain, chief of Tellach Dunchadha, was killed by the Fir-Manach in his own house on Cruachan on a night incursion. And they inflicted a massacre of women and men and children there and burned the town of Mag Tigernain on that expedition and came to their houses safe from that excursion.

The Annals of the Four Masters for 1412 state-

Cuconnaught Mac Tiernan, Chief of Teallach Dunchadha, was killed by the people of Fermanagh, in a nocturnal assault, in his own house at Cruachan Mhic-Tighearnain. And they massacred men, women, and children, and burned the whole town, and then returned home.

== Family ==
Cú Connacht had five sons- Mahon Buidhe, Brian Ballach, Eamonn Ruadh, Eoghan (d. 1418) and Fergal (d.1427). It is unclear which son succeeded as chief but the Annals of the Four Masters for 1419 state:

Hugh Boy O'Rourke, who was Lord of Breifny for one year and a half; died; and Teige O'Rourke was elected in his place by the O'Rourkes from Slieve-an-ierin West. But Art, son of Teige, son of Ualgarg, was elected in opposition to him from Slieve-an-ierin East, by the O'Reillys, the people of Teallach Donnchadha, and the descendants of Melaghlin Mac Rannall; so that the entire of Gairbhthrian Connacht was thrown into commotion by the contests between them.

The Annals of Connacht for 1419 state:

Aed Buide O Ruairc, king of Brefne for a year and a half, died this year in his own stronghold after possessing his lordship. Tadc O Ruairc was made king in his stead by the Muinter Ruairc from Sliab an Iarainn westwards; and Art son of Tadc O Ruairc was made king from the mountain eastwards by the Muinter Raigillig, the Tellach Dunchada and the descendants of Maelsechlainn Mag Ragnaill; so that they disturbed the whole Garbtrian of Connacht at that time. The Muinter Raigillig came with Art O Ruairc and encamped in Cenel Luachain.

The Annals of Breifne for 1419 state:

Aodh buidhe mac Tighearnain uí Ruairc rígh iarthair Bréithne do éag do fhiolún is an mbliadhainsi: agas Art mac Taidhg uí Ruairc do ríoghadh a cCruachain o cComráin le mac Raghnaill .i. Séafraidh, agas le mac Samhradháin agas le mac TighearnAin; agas a ttighearnas soin uile ag Eoghan ó Raghallaigh, righ Bréithne .i. Eoghan na féasóige, ('Hugh Boy, son of Ternan O'Rourke, king of West Breifne, died this year, and Art, son of Tadhg O'Rourke was inaugurated as king at Croaghan O'Cuprain by Mac Raghnaill, that is Geoffrey, and by The McGovern and by The McKiernan; all of whose lordships were held by Owen O'Reilly, King of Breifne, that is Owen of the Beard').

Preceded by Fergal Mág Tighearnán	Chief of McKiernan Clan; 1383–1412 AD	Succeeded by Tadhg Mág Tighearnán
