= Conchobar Buidhe Mág Tighearnán =

Clan chief in 14th century Ireland

Conchobar Buidhe Mág Tighearnán (anglicised Conor 'The Tawny' McKiernan) was chief of the McKiernan Clan and Baron or Lord of Tullyhunco barony, County Cavan from 1312 until 1314.

== Ancestry ==
Conchobar was the son of Gíolla Íosa 'Leith' Mág Tighearnán, son of Sithric Carrach in Cairn Mág Tighearnán (d.1290), son of Duarcán mac Íomhaor Mág Tighearnán (d.1290), son of Íomhaor mac Tighearnán Mág Tighearnán (died c.1269), son of Tighearnán, son of Duarcán, son of Íomhaor, son of Gíolla Chríost, son of Amhlaoibh, son of Tighearnán, the eponym. His grandfather Sithric 'Carrach-in-Cairn' Mág Tighearnán had been a previous chief of the clan. Conchobar's brothers were Matha Mág Tighearnán (d. 1311) a former chief of the clan, Domhnall 'An Saithnech' Mág Tighearnán (d.1312) whom he succeeded as chief, Tomás Mág Tighearnán (d.1358) who was also a chief of the clan, Duarcán, Cú Chonnacht, Cormac, Fergal 'Cend Craiche' and Mathghamhain (d. 1314).

== Description ==
Conchobar's nickname uidhe meant that he had had either blonde hair or an olive complexion.

== Head of the Lineage ==
On the death of the previous ceann fine, his brother Domhnall an Saithnech Mág Tighearnán in 1312, Conchobar took the chieftaincy and resided in the castle of Croaghan of the Cups (Irish- Cruachan O'Cúbhrán), now in the townland of Coolnashinny, besides the modern town of Killeshandra.

== Death ==
Conchobar was murdered in 1314 in the Battle of Kilmore, County Cavan. His brother Mathghamhain and many other McKiernans were also killed in the battle. Some of the annals give a later date for Conchobar's death.

The Annals of Ulster for 1314 state-

Conchobur Mag Tighernain 'the Tawny', chief of Tellach-Dunchadha, was slain in the defeat of Cell-mor and Mathgamain Mag Tighernain and the Red Gillie, son of the Herenagh and many more of his tribe and Nicholas Mac in Maighistir and many of his sept were slain.

The Annals of the Four Masters for 1317 state-

Mac Rory and the men of Breifny were defeated at Kilmore, where the son of Hugh Breifneach O'Conor was taken prisoner, and the two sons of Niall O'Rourke, Conor Boy Mac Tiernan, Chief of Teallach Dunchadha, Mahon Mac Tiernan, Gillaroe, son of the Erenagh Mac Tiernan, Nicholas Mac-an-Master, one hundred and forty of the gallowglasses of the people of MacRory, and others not enumerated, were slain.

The Annals of Connacht for the year 1317 state-

Defeat of Mac Ruaidri and the men of Brefne at Kilmore. Seven score gallowglasses of the followers of Mac Ruaidri were killed there, and two sons of Aed Brefnech O Conchobair were captured; Donnchad son of Niall O Ruairc, Conchobar Buide Mag Tigernain, chieftain of Tullyhunco, Mathgamain Mag Tigernain, Gilla Ruad son of the Erenagh Mag Tigernain, Nicol son of the Master and many others of their kin were also killed.

The Annals of Loch Cé for the year 1317 state-

The victory of Cill-mor over Mac Ruaidhri and the men of Breifne; and seven score gallowglasses of the son of Ruaidhri's people were slain there; and Aedh Breifnech O'Conchobhair's two sons were taken prisoners there; and Donnchadh, son of Niall O'Ruairc, and Conchobhar Buidhe Mac Tighernain, chieftain of Tellach-Dunchadha, were slain there, and Mathghamhain Mac Tighernain, and the Gilla-ruadh, son of the Airchinnech Mac Tighernain, and Nicholas Mac-in-Maigistir, and many more of his kindred besides.

The Annals of Clonmacnoise for 1317 state-

The overthrow of Kilmore was given upon mcRory & breifnie men, where 150 Gallowglasses belonging to mcRory were killed, & the sone of Hugh Breifnagh o'Connor was taken Captive, the 2 sones of Neale o'Roirk and Conor Boye mcTyernan cheiftaine of TeallayDonoghoe were killed, Mahon mcTyernan, Gilleroe mcAnarchinny, Nicoll mcen Maister and many others of that familie were alsoe killed.

Preceded by Domhnall 'An Saithnech' Mág Tighearnán	Chief of McKiernan Clan; 1312–1314 AD	Succeeded by Tomás Mág Tighearnán
