= Tomás Mág Tighearnán =

Chief of the McKiernan Clan

Tomás Mág Tighearnán (anglicised Thomas McKiernan) was chief of the McKiernan Clan and Baron or Lord of Tullyhunco barony, County Cavan from 1314 until his death in 1358.

== Ancestry ==
Tomás was the son of Gíolla Íosa 'Leith' Mág Tighearnán, son of Sithric ‘Carrach-in-Cairn’ Mág Tighearnán (d.1290), son of Duarcán Mág Tighearnán, the Second (d.1290), son of Íomhaor Mág Tighearnán, the Second (died c.1269), son of Tighearnán, son of Duarcán the First, son of Íomhaor the First, son of Gíolla Chríost, son of Amhlaoibh, son of Tighearnán, the founder of the clan. His grandfather Sithric ‘Carrach-in-Cairn’ Mág Tighearnán had been a previous chief of the clan. His brothers were Matha Mág Tighearnán (d. 1311) a former chief of the clan, Domhnall ’An Saithnech’ Mág Tighearnán (d.1312) another former chief of the clan, Conchobar ‘Buidhe’ Mág Tighearnán (d.1314) whom Tomás succeeded as chief, Duarcán, Cú Chonnacht, Cormac, Fergal ‘Cend Craiche’ and Mathghamhain (d.1314).

== Chieftainship ==
On the death of the previous chief, his brother Conchobar ‘Buidhe’ Mág Tighearnán in 1314, Tomás took the chieftaincy and resided in the castle of Croaghan of the Cups (Irish- Cruachan O'Cúbhrán), now in the townland of Coolnashinny, besides the modern town of Killeshandra.

In 1323 a relative died, Maoilmheadha Mág Tighearnán, the daughter of Gíolla Íosa Mór Mág Tighearnán, chief of the McKiernan Clan from c.1269 until his death in 1279, and wife of Brian ‘Breaghach’ Mág Samhradháin chief of the McGovern clan from 1272 to 1294. Maoilmheadha is referred to in the Book of Magauran at poems 1, 2, 24, 25 and 29. The Annals of the Four Masters for 1323 state- Maelmeadha, daughter of Mac Tiernan, and wife of Magauran, died.

In 1335 the McKiernans and their allies, the Clan Muircheartaigh Uí Conchobhair, captured the chief of the McGovern clan Tomás Mág Samhradháin the Second, son of the aforementioned Maoilmheadha Mág Tighearnán, but some annals give it as 1338.

The Annals of Ulster for 1335 state-

Tadhg, son of Ruaidhri, son of Cathal Ua Conchobuir, was taken prisoner by Thomas Mag Samhradhain and many of his people were killed. Mag Shamhradhain went to the house of Ua Concobuir the same year and he came back again and on his return an attack was made by the Clann-Muircertaigh and by Muinter-Eoluis and by the muster of the Breifni, both Foreigner and Gallowglass, on him. And Mag Shamhradhain was taken prisoner and many of his people were killed.

The Annals of the Four Masters for 1338 state-

Teige, son of Rory, son of Cathal O'Conor (who was usually called Bratach Righin), was taken prisoner by Thomas Magauran, and many of his people were killed. Magauran (i.e. Thomas) afterwards went to the house of O'Conor; but, on his return, the Clann-Murtough, and the Muintir-Eolais, assembled to meet him, and took him prisoner, after having slain many of his people.

The Annals of Connacht 1338 state-

Tadc son of Ruaidri son of Cathal Ruad O Conchobair, who was called Bratach Righin, was taken prisoner by Tomas Mag Samradain and many of his followers were killed. Afterwards Mag Samradain went to O Conchobair's house, and as he was coming away the Clan Murtagh and the Muinter Eolais assembled to intercept him, captured him and killed many of his men.

The Annals of Loch Cé under the year 1338 state-

Tadhg, son of Ruaidhri, son of Cathal Ruadh O'Conchobhair, usually called the 'Bratach righin', was taken prisoner by Thomas Mac Samhradhain; and many of his people were slain. Mac Samhradhain went afterwards to O'Conchobhair's house, and on his return from O'Conchobhair's house the Clann-Muirchertaigh and Muinter-Eolais assembled before him; and Mac Samhradhain was taken prisoner by them, and several of his people were slain.

Tomás was released from captivity a year later.

The Annals of Ulster for 1336 state-

Thomas Mag Samradhain, who was in custody with the Clann-Muircertaigh, was set free in that year, after the daughter of Donnchadh the Swarthy was renounced him and his two sons escaped that year likewise.

The Annals of the Four Masters for 1339 state-

Thomas Magauran was liberated by the Clann-Murtough.

The Annals of Connacht 1339 state-

Tomas Mag Samradain, who had been held in captivity by the Clan Murtagh, was let out.

The Annals of Loch Cé for 1339 state-

Thomas Mac Samhradhain, who was detained a prisoner by the Clann-Muirchertaigh, was set at liberty.

The Book of Magauran celebrates the release of Tomás Mág Samhradháin the Second in poem 24. Stanza 7 accuses the McKiernan clan of treachery as his mother was from the clan- Brian's son, ever generous with wealth, escaped the unnatural design of his mother's folk; though that folk made restitution against their will, the crime shall be rued.

The conflict with the McGovern clan continued in 1337 when Brian the son of Tomás Mág Samhradháin the Second was killed.

The Annals of Ulster for 1337 state-

Brian Mag Samradhain junior was killed by the Tellach-Dunchadha.

The Annals of the Four Masters for 1340 state-

Brian Oge Magauran was slain by the people of Teallach Dunchadha.

The Annals of Connacht 1340 state-

Brian Oc Mag Samradain was killed by the Tellach Dunchada.

The Annals of Loch Cé for 1340 state-

Brian Og Mac Samhradhain was killed by the Tellach-Dunchadha.

According to the Book of Magauran Tomás Mág Samhradháin the Second took revenge on the McKiernans. Poem 25, stanza 20 states- He drove Teallach Dúnchadha from their land, valiant the host that marched on Cruacha, Fal’s prince in their midst. Poem 26, stanza 13 states- Coming to fair Loch Uachtair, the three tuaths under the raider of Carn Currnán muster at Cruacha Ó gCubhrán.

In 1346 the McKiernans along with their allies, the Clan Muircheartaigh Uí Conchobhair, attacked the O’Farrell clan.

The Annals of the Four Masters for 1346 state-

Ivor, the son of Murrough O'Farrell, was slain by Brian Mac Tiernan and the Clann Murtough.

In the same year the McKiernans attacked the O’Rourke clan.

The Annals of the Four Masters for 1346 state-

Art, son of Thomas O'Rourke, was slain by Donell Mac Tiernan.

== Death ==
Tomás died in 1358 but some of the annals give a later date.

The Annals of Ulster for 1358 state-

Thomas Mag Tigernain, chief of Tellach-Dunchadha, died.

The Annals of the Four Masters for 1361 state-

Thomas Mac Tiernan, Chief of Teallach-Dunchadha died

The Annals of Connacht for the year 1361 state-

Tomas Mag Tigernain, chieftain of Tullyhuncoe, died.

The Annals of Loch Cé for the year 1361 state-

Thomas Mac Tighernain, chieftain of Tellach-Dunchadha, moritur.

== Family ==
Tomás had five sons- Fergal Mág Tighearnán who later was chief of the clan, Domhnall, Mahon, Macraith and Cú Connacht.

Preceded by Conchobar Buidhe Mág Tighearnán	ceann fine Mág Tighearnán; 1314–1358 AD	Succeeded by Brian Mág Tighearnán
