= Fergal mac Tomás Mág Tighearnán =

Chief of the McKiernan Clan (1362-1383)

Fergal mac Tomás Mág Tighearnán (anglicised Fergal McKiernan) was chief of the McKiernan Clan of Tullyhunco, County Cavan from 1362 until his death in 1383.

== Ancestry ==
Fergal was the son of Tomás Mág Tighearnán, son of Gíolla Íosa 'Leith' Mág Tighearnán, son of Sithric ‘Carrach-in-Cairn’ Mág Tighearnán (d.1290), son of Duarcán Mág Tighearnán, the Second (d.1290), son of Íomhaor Mág Tighearnán, the Second (died c.1269), son of Tighearnán, son of Duarcán the First, son of Íomhaor the First, son of Gíolla Chríost, son of Amhlaoibh, son of Tighearnán, the founder of the clan. His father Tomás Mág Tighearnán had been a previous chief of the clan. Fergal's brothers were Domhnall, Mahon, Macraith and Cú Connacht.

== Ceann fine ==
On the death of the previous ceanne fine, his first cousin Brian Mág Tighearnán, in 1362, Fergal became head of the lineage and resided in the castle of Cruachan Ua Cúbhrán, now in the townland of Coolnashinny, besides the modern town of Killeshandra.

In 1364 two relatives, Sitric and Cathal McKiernan died but some annals give a later date.

The Annals of Ulster for 1364 state-

Sitric, son of the herenagh, a prince of general fame and noble head of his own sept, died. Cathal, son of Imar Mag Tigernain, general support for weak and strong, died.

The Annals of Loch Cé for 1367 state-

Sitric, son of the Airchinnech Mac Tighernain, mortuus est. Cathal, son of Imhar Mac Tighernain, mortuus est.

The Annals of Connacht for 1367 state-

Sitrecc son of the erenagh Mag Tigernain died. Cathal son of Imar Mag Tigernain died.

In 1364 Fergal and his allies, the Clan Muircheartaigh Uí Conchobhair, raided the McDermott clan.

The Annals of Ulster for 1364 state-

A great migratory incursion was made by the Clann-Muircertaigh into Magh-Nissi, and an attack was made by them on the people of Magh-Luirg, namely, by Tadhg, son of Ruaidhri Ua Conchobuir and by the nobles of his people, together with their great muster that is, with Fergal Mag Tigernain, chief of Tellach Dunchada and by Diarmait Mag Raghnaill, chief of Muinter-Eoluis, along with a muster of Gaidhil and gallowglasses. The stronghold of Aedh Mac Diarmata was burned by them. Fergal Mac Diarmata, king of Magh-Luirg and Aedh Mac Diarmata rose out in that movement. An onset and attack of cavalry exclusively was given to each other at Ait-tighi-Mic-Coise and decisive defeat was inflicted on the people of Magh-Luirg and twelve persons were killed of the favourite nobles of Mac Diarmata and Aedh himself was injured there. And Mac Diarmata and Aedh Mac Diarmata took charge of the rear of their people spiritedly and powerfully from that out.

The Annals of the Four Masters for 1367 state-

The Clann-Murtough came upon a migratory excursion to Magh-nisse, and made an incursion into Moylurg. The most illustrious of those who set out on this incursion were Teige, son of Rory O'Conor; Farrell Mac Tiernan, Lord of Teallach Dunchadha; and Dermot Mac Rannall, Lord of Muintir-Eolais: these were accompanied by many gallowglasses. They burned the fortified residence of Hugh Mac Dermot; but Farrell Mac Dermot and Hugh Mac Dermot, Lord of Moylurg, opposed them; and a battle ensued, in which many were slain on both sides. Teige O'Conor and Mac Rannall then returned, without having gained either booty or consideration.

The Annals of Connacht 1367 state-

The Clan Murtagh migrated into Mag Nisi this year. They made an expedition into Moylurg—Tadc son of Ruaidri O Conchobair and Fergal Mag Tigernain, chieftain of Tullyhunco, and Diarmait Mag Ragnaill, chieftain of the Muinter Eolais, together with some gallowglasses—and burnt the stronghold of Aed Mac Diarmata. Fergal Mac Diarmata, king of Moylurg, and Aed caught up with them and gave battle to them, and killed some of their men.

The Annals of Loch Cé under the year 1367 state-

A migratory excursion was made by the Clann-Muirchertaigh to Magh-Nise in hoc anno, and they went on an expedition into Magh-Luirg, viz., Tadhg, son of Ruaidhri O'Conchobhair and Ferghal Mac Tighernain, dux of Tellach-Dunchadha, and Diarmaid Mac Raghnaill, dux of Muinter-Eolais, accompanied by gallowglasses. And they burned Aedh Mac Diarmada's fortress. Ferghal Mac Diarmada, king of Magh-Luirg, and Aedh Mac Diarmada, overtook them, and gave them battle, and killed some of their people.

In 1367 The McKiernans and their allies, the Clan Muircheartaigh Uí Conchobhair, fought with the O’Reillys, O’Rourkes, Maguires and others but were banished into Burke territory.

The Annals of Ulster for 1367 state-

Great war arose in this year between the Clann-Muircertaigh and Muinter-Ruairc. O'Raighillaigh and Mag Uidhir and O'Ferghail and O'Concobuir rose out against the Clann Muircertaigh and forced them into Muinter-Eoluis. And Mag Raghnaill abandoned them through the excessive power of those kings and they and Mag Tigernain with them were forced to join Mac William de Burgh

The Annals of the Four Masters for 1370 state-

Teige O'Rourke assumed the lordship of Breifny; but the Clann-Murtough, Mac Tiernan, and Conor Roe, the son of Cathal, son of Hugh Breifneach, banished him to the territory of Mac William.

The Annals of Connacht 1370 state-

A great war between the Clan Murtagh and the Ui Raigillig this year. O Raigillig, O Fergail, Mag Uidir and O Conchobair rose up against the Clan Murtagh and with their combined forces drove them out of Muinter Eolais. From here the Clan Murtagh went to [seek refuge with] Macwilliam Burke, and Mag Tigernain went with them.

The Annals of Loch Cé for 1370 state-

A great war between the Clann-Muirchertaigh and Muinter-Raighilligh in hoc anno. O'Raighilligh, and O'Ferghail, and Mac Udhir, and O'Conchobhair rose against the Clann-Muirchertaigh, who were driven into Muinter-Eolais through the power of these kings; and they went from thence unto Mac William Burk; and Mac Tighernain went along with them.

In 1369 two of Fergal's first cousins, once removed, Toirdhealbhach and Tighearnán, died. Both were sons of the previous chief Brian Mág Tighearnán.

The Annals of Ulster for 1369 state-

Toirdelbach, son of Brian Mag Tigernain, died. Tigernan, son of Brian Mag Tigernain, a spirited, powerful son of a chief, died this year.

The Annals of the Four Masters for 1374 state-

Tiernan, the son of Brian Mac Tiernan, died.

The Annals of Loch Cé for 1374 state-

Tighernan, son of Brian Mac Tighernain, a good son of a chieftain, quievit.

The Annals of Connacht for 1374 state-

Tigernan son of Brian Mag Tigernain, good son of a chieftain, rested.

In 1370 two of Fergal's sons, Cairbre and Eoghan were killed by the English.

The Annals of Ulster for 1370 state-

The sons of Mag Tigernain, namely, Cairbri and Eogan, went on an expedition to attack the Foreigners. And a traitor sold them to the Foreigners, and the Foreigners assembled around them and five and twenty were slain there.

The Annals of the Four Masters for 1375 state-

Carbry and Owen, two sons of Mac Tiernan, marched against the English with all their forces; but one of their own people acted treacherously towards them, and betrayed them to the English for a bribe. The English surrounded them, after they had been betrayed to them, and beheaded on the spot the sons of Mac Teirnan, and twenty-five of the chiefs of their people.

The Annals of Loch Cé for 1375 state-

The two sons of Mac Tighernain, viz., Cairbre and Eoghan, went on an expedition against the Foreigners; and a man of their own people betrayed them, and sold them to the Foreigners for the sake of wealth; and the Foreigners assembled around them, and five and twenty were slain there, and beheaded, along with the two sons of Mac Tighernain.

The Annals of Connacht for 1375 state-

Cairbre and Eogan, sons of Mag Tigernain, made an expedition against the Galls and one of their own men turned traitor and sold them to the Galls for pelf. The Galls gathered round them, killed twenty-five of them, including the two sons of Mag Tigernain, and cut off their heads.

In 1372 the poet Seán Mór Ó Dubhagáin wrote a poem about the tribes of Ireland- Triallam timcheall na Fodla. The McKiernans are mentioned as follows-

MacTighearnain of cloaks,

Support of the fair Gaoidhil;

The purchaser of the poets, and their friend,

Is over the vehement Teallach Dunchadha.

In 1373, Fergal's sister-in-law Barrdubh, wife of Domhnall Mág Tighearnán, died.

The Annals of Ulster for 1373 state-

Barrdubh, daughter of Ua Ruairc, died.

The Annals of the Four Masters for 1373 state-

Barrduv, daughter of O'Rourke, and wife of Mac Tiernan, died.

The Annals of Loch Cé for 1373 state-

Barrdubh, daughter of O'Ruairc, wife of Domhnall Mac Tighernain, quievit.

The Annals of Connacht for 1373 state-

Barrdub daughter of O Ruairc, wife of Domnall Mag Tigernain, rested.

The Annals of Breifne for 1383 state:

Tuath Teallaigh nDonnchadha agas críoch Mhathghamhna Uí Raghallaigh do loscadh le ceithirnuí Chonchabhair, ('The territory of Tullyhunco and the lands of Mahon O’Reilly were laid waste by the soldiers of O’Connor').

== Death ==
Fergal mac Tomás died in 1383.

The Annals of the Four Masters for 1383 state-

Farrell, the son of Thomas Mac Tiernan, Chief of Teallach Dunchadha, died

== Family ==
Fergal mac Tomás had six sons- Cairbre (d.1370), Manus, Brian, Lochlann, Eoghan (d. 1370) and Tomás.

| Preceded by Brian Mág Tighearnán | Chief of McKiernan Clan; 1362–1383 AD | Succeeded by Cú Connacht Mág Tighearnán |
