= Domhnall "An Saithnech" Mág Tighearnán =

Clan chief in 14th century Ireland

Domhnall 'An Saithnech' Mág Tighearnán (anglicised Donal McKiernan of Saitne) was chief of the McKiernan Clan and Baron or Lord of Tullyhunco barony, County Cavan from 1311 until 1312.

== Ancestry ==
Domhnall was the son of Gíolla Íosa 'Leith' Mág Tighearnán, son of Sithric 'Carrach-in-Cairn' Mág Tighearnán (d.1290), son of Duarcán Mág Tighearnán, the Second (d.1290), son of Íomhaor Mág Tighearnán, the Second (died c.1269), son of Tighearnán, son of Duarcán the First, son of Íomhaor the First, son of Gíolla Chríost, son of Amhlaoibh, son of Tighearnán, the founder of the clan. His grandfather Sithric 'Carrach-in-Cairn' Mág Tighearnán had been a previous chief of the clan. Domhnall's brothers were Matha Mág Tighearnán (d. 1311) whom he succeeded as chief, Conchobar 'Buidhe' Mág Tighearnán who was also a chief, Tomás Mág Tighearnán (d.1358) who was also a chief of the clan, Duarcán, Cú Chonnacht, Cormac, Fergal 'Cend Craiche' and Mathghamhain (d.1314).

== Description ==
Domhnall's nickname 'An Saithnech' probably meant that he had been fostered in Saitne, now Dunsany, County Meath, by the Ua Cathasaigh clan.

== Chieftainship ==
On the death of the previous chief, his brother Matha Mág Tighearnán in 1311, Domhnall took the chieftaincy and resided in the castle of Croaghan of the Cups (Irish- Cruachan O'Cúbhrán), now in the townland of Coolnashinny, besides the modern town of Killeshandra.

== Death ==
Domhnall was murdered in 1312 by Cathal 'na-taisech' Ó Ruairc (d.1329), the same man who murdered his brother Matha Mág Tighearnán in the previous year, so Domhnall may have been trying to get revenge for Matha's death. Cathal's nickname 'na-taisech' meant 'Of the chiefs' because he was the son of Domhnall O'Rourke, Lord of Breifne O'Rourke from 1307 to 1311, and brother to two O'Rourke chiefs, Ualgarg Mór Ó Ruairc (reigned 1316–1346) and Flaithbheartach O'Rourke, King of Breifne O'Rourke from 1346 to 1349 (deposed 1349, died 1352). Some of the annals give a later date for Domhnall's death.

The Annals of Connacht for the year 1315 state-

Domnall Mag Tigernain, chieftain of Tullyhunco, who used to be called the Saitnech, was killed by Cathal na Taisech O Ruairc.

The Annals of Loch Cé for the year 1315 state-

Domhnall Mac Tighernain, dux of Tellach-Dunchadha, who was usually called 'the Saithnech', was slain by Cathal-na-taisech O'Ruairc.

| Preceded by Matha Mág Tighearnán | Chief of McKiernan Clan; 1311–1312 AD | Succeeded by Conchobar 'Buidhe' Mág Tighearnán |
