= Brian Mág Tighearnán =

Brian Mág Tighearnán (anglicised Brian McKiernan) was chief of the McKiernan Clan of Tullyhunco, County Cavan from 1358 until 1362.

== Ancestry ==
Brian was the son of Matha Mág Tighearnán (d.1311), son of Gíolla Íosa 'Leith' Mág Tighearnán, son of Sithric ‘Carrach-in-Cairn’ Mág Tighearnán (d.1290), son of Duarcán Mág Tighearnán, the Second (d.1290), son of Íomhaor Mág Tighearnán, the Second (died c.1269), son of Tighearnán, son of Duarcán the First, son of Íomhaor the First, son of Gíolla Chríost, son of Amhlaoibh, son of Tighearnán, the founder of the clan. His father Matha Mág Tighearnán had been a previous chief of the clan. Brian’s brothers were Amlaibh, Matha and Gíolla Íosa Óg.

== Chieftainship ==
On the death of the previous chief, his uncle Tomás Mág Tighearnán in 1358, Brian took the chieftaincy and resided in the castle of Croaghan of the Cups (Irish- Cruachan O'Cúbhrán), now in the townland of Coolnashinny, besides the modern town of Killeshandra.

On 29 April 1361 his wife Aifric died.

The Annals of Ulster for 1361 state-

Aiffric, daughter of Brian Ua Raighillaigh, wife of Brian Mag Tigernain, died a week before Easter. And there was no stint to her goodness up to the time of her decease.

The Annals of the Four Masters for 1364 state-

Affrica, daughter of Brian O'Reilly, and wife of Brian Mac Tiarnan, died.

== Description ==
According to his death eulogy Brian was a very generous host.

== Death ==
Brian died on 25 July 1362 but some of the annals give a later date.

The Annals of Ulster for 1362 state

Brian, son of Matthew Mag Tigernain, the son of a chief of greatest felicity and pre-eminence, general patron respecting food and cattle, died about the feast of Saint James July 25 that year, as the poet said:

Brian Mag Tigernain of the contests,

With his hospitality comparison were not just

He practised hospitality without reward,

Heaven was the end of his battle-career.

The Annals of the Four Masters for 1365 state-

Brian, the son of Matthew Mac Tiernarn, Chief of Teallach Dunchadha, the most distinguished for valour, renown, fame, and power, of the sub-chieftains of Breifny, died. Of him was said:

Brian Mac Tiernan of the battles,

Whose hospitality was incomparable;

He followed generosity without hatred,

And heaven was the goal of his career.

The Annals of Connacht for the year 1365 state-

Brian son of Matha Mag Tigernain, chieftain of Tullyhuncoe, the most famous man of the Brefnians, died. As the poet says: ‘Brian Mag Tigernain of the encounters, no bounty should be compared with his bounty; peacefully he ever practised hospitality; Heaven was the end of his career.

The Annals of Loch Cé for the year 1365 state-

Brian, son of Matthew Mac Tighernain, chieftain of Tellach-Dunchadha, the most famous man of the Breifnians, mortuus est, ut dicitur—

Brian Mac Tighernain of the conflicts

With his hospitality comparison was not just

He followed generosity without hatred;

Heaven was the end of his battle-career.

== Family ==
Brian was married to Aifric (d.1361), the daughter of Brian O’Reilly and had at least one daughter, Áine (d.1405) and nine sons- Brian, Tighearnán (d.1369), Cathal, Cú Connacht, Philip, Manus, Toirdhealbhach (d.1369), Maol Sechlann, Flaherty 'Riabhach' and Gíolla Íosa (d.1424).

Preceded by Tomás Mág Tighearnán	Chief of McKiernan Clan; 1358–1362 AD	Succeeded by Fergal Mág Tighearnán
