= Kernan =

Kernan may refer to:

== People ==
=== Surname ===
- Catherine Kernan (born 1948), American artist
- Edward Kernan (1771–1844), Irish clergyman
- Francis Kernan (1816–1892), American politician
- Francis Joseph Kernan (1859-1945), American general
- James Kernan (born 1958), Irish equestrian
- James Lawrence Kernan (1838–1912), American theater manager and philanthropist
- Joe Kernan (disambiguation), several people
- Joseph D. Kernan (born 1955), American admiral
- Michael Kernan (1927–2005), American journalist and book author
- Michael J. Kernan (1884–1953), New York politician
- William F. Kernan (1946–2025), American general

=== Given name ===
- Kernan "Skip" Hand (born 1945), Louisiana politician defeated by Kathleen Blanco

== Places ==
- Kernan, County Down, a townland in Tullylish, County Down, Northern Ireland, United Kingdom
- Kernan, County Armagh, a townland in County Armagh, Northern Ireland, United Kingdom
- Kernan, Illinois, an unincorporated community, United States

== Other ==
- James Lawrence Kernan Hospital, hospital located in Woodlawn, Maryland, United States

== See also ==
- McKiernan Clan
- McKernan (surname)
- McKiernan
- McTiernan
- McTernan
- Kiernan
- Tiernan
- Kernen, a municipality in Germany
- Joe Kernen (born 1956), American news anchor
