= McKernan =

McKernan is an Irish surname originating in Cavan.

== People ==
Notable people with the surname include:

- Corey McKernan (born 1973), Australian rules footballer
- Hugh McKernan (1858–1929), Australian politician
- Jackie McKernan (born 1965), British athlete from Northern Ireland
- James McKernan (born 1964), British mathematician
- John R. McKernan Jr. (born 1948), American politician, Governor of Maine
- Ken McKernan (1911–2009), Australian rules footballer
- Kevin McKernan (born 1987), Irish Gaelic footballer
- Noel McKernan (born 1945), Australian rules footballer
- P. Patrick McKernan (1941–2001), American baseball administrator
- Ron "Pigpen" McKernan (1945–1973), American musician, Grateful Dead
- Shaun McKernan (born 1990), Australian rules footballer
- Timothy McKernan (born 1989), American ice dancer
- Declan McKernan (born 2007), American football college player

== Places ==
- McKernan, Edmonton, Canada
- McKernan/Belgravia station, Edmonton, Canada

== See also ==
- McKiernan Clan
- McKiernan (surname)
- McKernon (disambiguation)
- McTiernan
- McTernan
- Kiernan
- Kernan (disambiguation)
- Tiernan
