= Matha Mág Tighearnán =

Clan chief in 13th–14th century Ireland

Matha Mág Tighearnán (anglicised Matthew McKiernan) was chief of the McKiernan Clan and Baron or Lord of Tullyhunco barony, County Cavan from 1290 until 1311.

== Ancestry ==
Matha was the son of Gíolla Íosa 'Leith' Mág Tighearnán, son of Sithric ‘Carrach-in-Cairn’ Mág Tighearnán (d.1290), son of Duarcán Mág Tighearnán, the Second (d.1290), son of Íomhaor Mág Tighearnán, the Second (died c.1269), son of Tighearnán, son of Duarcán the First, son of Íomhaor the First, son of Gíolla Chríost, son of Amhlaoibh, son of Tighearnán, the founder of the clan. His grandfather Sithric ‘Carrach-in-Cairn’ Mág Tighearnán had been a previous chief of the clan. Matha’s brothers were Domhnall ’An Saithnech’ Mág Tighearnán (d.1312) who succeeded him as chief of the clan, Conchobar ‘Buidhe’ Mág Tighearnán (d.1314) who was also a chief of the clan, Tomás Mág Tighearnán (d.1358) who was also a chief of the clan, Duarcán, Cú Chonnacht, Cormac, Fergal 'Cend Craiche' and Mathghamhain (d. 1314).

== Chieftainship ==
On the death of the previous chief, his grandfather Sithric ‘Carrach-in-Cairn’ Mág Tighearnán in 1290, Matha took the chieftaincy and resided in the castle of Croaghan of the Cups (Irish- Cruachan O'Cúbhrán), now in the townland of Coolnashinny, besides the modern town of Killeshandra. The McKiernans were involved in a running feud with the neighbouring O'Reilly clan.

The Annals of Connacht for 1293 state-

Fergal O Raigillig, chieftain of Muinter Mailmorda for twelve years, was killed in the midst of his own stronghold by the Tellach Dunchada this year.

The Annals of Loch Cé for 1293 state-

Ferghal O'Raighilligh, chieftain of Muinter-Maelmórdha during the space of twelve years, was killed in the middle of his own residence by the Tellach-Dunchadha, in hoc anno.

In 1301 there was a clash in the McKiernan lands with the O'Reilly and McGovern clans on New Year's Day. It happened in the townland of Aghnacor, parish of Killeshandra, barony of Tullyhunco, County Cavan, but the annals give different dates. Matthew O'Reilly was killed in the clash. He was the son of the Lord of East Breifne Gilla Isu Ruad mac Domnaill O'Raghallaigh (reigned 1293–1330), and son-in-law of the chief of the McGoverns, Brian ‘Breaghach’ Mág Samhradháin (reigned 1272-1294), being married to Brian's daughter Gormlaidh. Poem 9 in the Book of Magauran is dedicated to Mrs Gormlaidh O'Reilly-McGovern and was written at the time of Matthew O'Reilly's death by the poet Maol Pádraig Mac Naimhin (or Cnáimhín). Stanza 37 refers to Matthew's death as follows-

Matha's gracefulness could be seen beneath his fair hair even as he was laid low by the hands of his foes; Ó Raighilligh ever near to spears ruins Magh Fáil by his grave.

The Annals of Ulster for 1301 state-

Matthew Ua Raghailligh Junior was killed by the Tellach-Dunchadha.

The Annals of Loch Cé for 1304 state-

Matthew, son of Gilla-Isa O'Raighilligh, king of Breifne, was slain by the Tellach-Dunchadha on Achadh-na-corra, and his gallowglasses were slain there along with him. Mac Shamhradhain and Mac Dorchaidh were wounded there, moreover, along with them. But the ALC then repeats the incident for 1305- Matthew Og O'Raighilligh was killed by the Tellach-Dunchadha.

The Annals of Connacht for 1304 state-

Matha son of Gilla Isa O Raigillig, king of Brefne, was killed by the Tellach Dunchada at Aghnacor; some gallowglasses were killed there with him and Mac Samradain and Mac Dorchaid were wounded as well. But the AC then repeats the incident for 1305- Matha Oc O Raigillig was killed by the Tellach Dunchada.

Mac Carthaigh's Book for 1304 states-

The first of January. Matha son of Giolla Íosa Ó Raighilligh, king of Bréifne, was killed, together with gallowglasses, at Achadh na Corra by the Teallach Dúnchadha. Mac Samhradháin and Mac Dorchaidh were wounded there. But it repeats the incident for 1305- Matha Óg Ó Raighilligh was killed by the Teallach Dúnchadha.

The Annals of the Four Masters for 1305 state-

Matthew Oge O'Reilly was slain by the inhabitants of Teallach-Dunchadha.

In 1308 his relative Tighearnán died.

The Annals of Connacht for 1308 state-

Tigernan Mag Tigernain died.

Mac Carthaigh's Book for 1308 states-

Tighearnán Mac Tighearnán died.

== Death ==
Matha was murdered in Croaghan in 1311 by his foster-son Cathal 'na-taisech' Ó Ruairc. Cathal's nickname 'na-taisech' meant 'Of the chiefs' because he was the son of Domhnall O’Rourke, Lord of Breifne O'Rourke from 1307 to 1311, and brother to two O'Rourke chiefs, Ualgarg Mór Ó Ruairc (reigned 1316-1346) and Flaithbheartach O’Rourke, King of Breifne O’Rourke from 1346-1349 (deposed 1349, died 1352). Some of the annals give a later date for Matha's death.

The Annals of Ulster for 1311 state

Matthew Mag Tigernain was killed by Cathal O'Ruairc.

The Annals of the Four Masters for 1314 state-

Matthew Mac Tiernan was slain by Cathal O'Rourke.

The Annals of Connacht for the year 1314 state-

Matha Mag Tigernain, chieftain of Tullyhuncoe, was killed in treachery by Cathal son of Domnall O Ruairc, his foster-son, on the floor of his own house.

The Annals of Loch Cé for the year 1314 state-

Matthew Mac Tighernain, dux of Tellach-Dunchadha, was slain by Cathal, son of Domhnall O'Ruairc, i.e. his foster-son, in the middle of his own house, by treachery.

== Family ==
Matha had four sons- Brian Mág Tighearnán who also became chief of the clan, Amlaibh, Matha and Gíolla Íosa Óg.

| Preceded by Sithric ‘Carrach-in-Cairn’ Mág Tighearnán | Chief of McKiernan Clan; 1290–1311 AD | Succeeded by Domhnall ’An Saithnech’ Mág Tighearnán |
