= Kiernan =

Kiernan is a surname of Irish origin and a unisex given name, and may refer to:

== Surname ==
- Ben Kiernan (born 1953), professor of history at Yale
- Brady Kiernan, filmmaker
- Caitlín R. Kiernan (born 1964), paleontologist and novelist
- Colm Kiernan (1931–2010), Australian historian
- Ford Kiernan (born 1962), Scottish comedian, actor and scriptwriter
- Francis Kiernan (1800–1874), Irish anatomist
- Greta Kiernan (1933-2023), American politician
- Ian Kiernan (1940–2018), Australian yachtsman and environmentalist
- Jerry Kiernan (1953–2021), Irish long-distance runner.
- John J. Kiernan (1847–1893), New York financial news pioneer and politician
- Kitty Kiernan (1893–1945), fiancée of Irish revolutionary leader Michael Collins
- Leanne Kiernan (born 1999), Irish soccer player, played for Ireland, West Ham United, and Liverpool F.C.
- Mike Kiernan (born 1961), Irish rugby player, played for Dolphins, Ireland and the Lions
- Pat Kiernan (born 1968), Canadian-American TV host
- Patrick Kiernan (equestrian) (1929–2003), Irish equestrian at the 1956 Olympics
- Scarlett Kiernan, fictional character from Doctors
- Tom Kiernan (1939–2022), Irish rugby player, played for Cork Constitution, Ireland and the Lions
- Victor Kiernan (1913–2009), British Marxist historian, translator of Urdu poetry
- Walter Kiernan (1902–1978), American writer and game show host

== Given name ==
- Kiernan Dewsbury-Hall (born 1998), English footballer
- Kiernan Dorney (1912 – 2007), decorated Australian surgeon
- Kiernan Forbes (1988 – 2023), South African rapper known as AKA
- Kiernan Hughes-Mason (born 1991), English footballer
- Kiernan Shipka (born 1999), American actress

== See also ==
- McKiernan Clan
- McKernan (surname)
- McKiernan
- McTiernan
- McTernan
- Kernan (disambiguation)
- Tiernan
