= Brian Bán Mág Tighearnán =

Brian Bán Mág Tighearnán (anglicized Brian Ban McKiernan) was head of the McKiernan Clan of Tullyhunco, County Cavan, Ireland from 1588 until his death on 4 September 1622.

== Ceann Fine ==
After the death of Fergal Mág Tighearnán the Third in 1588, Brian Mág Tighearnán became ceann fine ('head of the lineage') and resided in the castle of Croghan UaCúbhrán ('Croaghan of the Cups', now in the townland of Coolnashinny, beside the modern town of Killeshandra. In 1595, Hugh Roe O'Donnell, head of the O'Donnell dynasty, began a rebellion against the English. O'Donnell marched into Connacht and destroyed many English settlements. On his way back, O'Donnell camped on the Mág Tighearnán lands in Tullyhunco. The Annals of the Four Masters for 1595 state:

The son of the Prior O'Reilly was taken prisoner by others of the army. As much of the property of the country as they wished to have was collected and gathered, and brought to them from every quarter. They then proceeded with their preys and spoils and pitched their camp that night in Teallach-Dunchadha. On the next day they sent marauding parties to the monastery of Cavan, to see whether they could get an advantage of the English who were quartered in it; but as they did not find any of the English about the town, they carried off everything of value belonging to them to which they came. They marched that night to Teallach-Eachdhach, west of Bel-atha-Chonaill; and from thence they returned home, after the victory of expedition on that occasion.

— Annals of the Four Masters, Volume 6 (AD 1589–1616)

On 9 June 1602 Queen Elizabeth I of England granted a pardon (fiant No. 6657) to Bryne Bane M'Kernan for fighting against the Queen's forces.

== Plantation of Ulster ==
In the Plantation of Ulster grant dated 4 June 1611, King James VI and I granted 400 acres 160 ha or 7 poles (a poll is local name for townland) of land in Tullyhunco at an annual rent of £4 5s. 4d., to Bryan McKearnan, gentleman, comprising the modern-day townlands of Clontygrigny, Cornacrum, Cornahaia, Derrinlester, Dring, Drumlarah, Ardlougher and Kiltynaskellan. Under the terms of the grant, Mág Tighearnán was obliged to build a house on this land. In a visitation by George Carew, 1st Earl of Totnes in autumn 1611, it was recorded, McKyernan removed to his proportion and is about building a house. On 23 March 1615 Mág Tighearnán granted a lease on these lands to James Craig. On 1 May 1611 James Craig leased, 1 poll of Toneloy and 4 polls of Croghan to Brieno bane McKernan.

== Death and family ==
On 14 March 1630 an Inquisition of King Charles I of England held in Cavan Town stated that Brian McKiernan died on 4 September 1622, and his lands comprising seven poles and three pottles in Clonkeen, Clontygrigny, Cornacrum, Derrinlester, Dring, Killygorman, Kiltynaskellan, and Mullaghdoo, Cavan went to his nearest relatives. The most likely inheritors being Cahill, son of Owen McKiernan; Brian, son of Turlough McKiernan; and Farrell, son of Phelim McKiernan, all aged over 21 and married.

Preceded by Fergal Mág Tighearnán, the Third	Chief of McKiernan Clan; 1588–1622 AD	Succeeded by John Mág Tighearnán, the Second
