= Fergal Mág Tighearnán, the Third =

Fergal Mág Tighearnán, the Third (anglicised Fergal McKiernan) was chief of the McKiernan Clan of Tullyhunco, County Cavan until his death in 1588.

== Chieftainship ==
The Annals do not mention Tullyhunco between 1523 and 1582 apart from a fight that occurred there, at Ardra Lough in the townland of Corran in Killeshandra parish, between members of the O'Reilly clan. The Annals of Breifne for 1563 state:

Conchabhar, son of the prior, that is Phillip, son of Maelmordha, and Seán, son of Toirdhealbhach, son of Fearghail, fell together at the lake of Gleann an Chorainn in Tullyhunco; and a great war broke out between the descendants of Fearghal O'Reilly and the children of the prior of the Clan Mathghamhna.

The O'Reilly Pedigree, page 343, states:

Conor, the son of the Prior O'Reilly, and John, the son of Torlogh, fell by each other at the Lake of Glen Coran in Teallach Dunchadha.

On the death of the previous McKiernan chief, Fergal took the chieftaincy and resided in the castle of Croaghan of the Cups (Irish: Cruachan O'Cúbhrán, now the townland of Croaghan), now in the townland of Coolnashinny, beside the modern town of Killeshandra.

In 1582 O'Rourke, the High Sheriff of Leitrim and the English attacked the McKiernans.

The Annals of Loch Cé for the year 1582 state:

Another depredation was committed by the sheriff O'Ruairc, and by the Saxons along with him, upon the sons of Mac Tighernain of the Breifne, at Loch-Roda; and their women were borne off captives from them.

== John McKiernan ==
On 7 November 1587 John McKiernan, the under-sheriff of County Westmeath, a native of Aghaweenagh in Tullyhunco, petitioned the government to appoint him the seneschal of Tullyhunco in order to civilise the natives.

Nov. 7. 4. Petition of John Kernan to Burghley. Humbly beseecheth your honourable Lordship, your orator, John Kernan, of Aghewehan, in the territory or cantred of Tolconchoe, alias M'Kernan's country, in the county of the Cavan, within the realm of Ireland, that it may please your Lordship with your favour to further his petition to Her Majesty for the grant of the reversion of the office of Clerk of Common Pleas in the Exchequer for his life, and of the seneschalship of the said cantred to him and to his heirs males of his body, in consideration of his endeavours in Her Majesty's service in the government of Sir William Fytzwylliams, Arthur Lord Grey, and the Lords Justices [Loftus and Wallop], and the rather that your said orator, through the entreaty of his kinsmen, the inhabitants of the said cantred, has left the English Pale to dwell among them, hoping, if convenient countenance be afforded to him by the said grant, to bring them, through dutiful exhortation, and examples of husbandry and other civil trades, from their disorders and disobedience to the due regard of loyalty and obedience. Your said orator presenteth unto your honourable Lordship the opinion and testimony of the Lord Grey and Sir William Fytzwylliams touching your orator by their several letters unto Mr. Secretary Walsyngham, being required so to do by his Honour, at his last being at the Court, since which time your orator hath dutifully attended your Honours and the other Lords of Her Majesty's most honourable Council for Her Majesty's most gracious pleasure in his said suit, and yet some seeking the disgrace of your orator have rumoured that he is suitor for the seneschalship of Meath and Westmeath long since, with the liberty and jurisdiction palatine of the said counties determined and annulled by parliament. Your orator's poor suit is none other than as hereby is declared, a matter of small profit to your orator and less charge to Her Majesty, and in regard thereof moved rather than anything more chargeable to Her Highness, whereof your orator hopeth that your Honour in your grave judgment will think him worthy.

He was granted the position by Fiant No. 5156 on 20 March 1588

Grant to John Kearnan, gent; of the office of seneschal of the territory of Upper Talconchoe alias M’Kearnans country in co. Cavan. To hold during good behavior, with all accustomed profits. With power to raise the inhabitants, and command them for defence of the territory, the public weal of the inhabitants, and the punishment of malefactors; to prosecute, banish, and punish by all means malefactors, rebels, vagabonds, rymors, Irish harpers, bards, bentules, carrowes, idle men and women, and those who assist such; and twice a year within a month after Easter and Michaelmas respectively to hold a court and law day. He shall not take any unlawful Irish exactions from the inhabitants, as to cess them with kern, nor impose coney or livery, without direction of the Lord Deputy.

== Death ==
The Annals of Loch Cé for the year 1588 state: "Mac Tighernain of the Breifne, i.e., Ferghal, died."

Preceded by Fergal Mág Tighearnán, the Second	ceann fine Mág Tighearnán; 15??–1588 AD	Succeeded by Brian Bán Mág Tighearnán
