= McTernan =

McTernan is a surname. Notable people with the surname include:

- Brian McTernan, an American musician
- John McTernan (actor), an Australian actor
- John McTernan (born 1959), an English politician and political consultant
- Madeleine McTernan (born 2000), an Australian paralympic swimmer
- Sarah McTernan (born 1994), an Irish singer-songwriter

== See also ==
- McKiernan Clan
- McKernan (surname)
- McKiernan
- McTiernan
- Tiernan
- Kiernan
- Kernan (disambiguation)
