= King of Baseball =

Award in Minor League Baseball

- Sport: Baseball
- League: Minor League Baseball
- Awarded for: Longtime dedication and service to professional baseball
- Country: United States; Canada; Mexico
- Presented by: Minor League Baseball

History
- First award: Pants Rowland (1951)
- Final award: Bob Lozinak (2019)

King of Baseball was a ceremonial title awarded annually from 1951 to 2019 by Minor League Baseball to recognize an individual for their longtime dedication and service to professional baseball. It was awarded during baseball's Winter Meetings and usually presented along with a crown and robe.

The title originated in a beauty pageant held in celebration of the 50th anniversary of Minor League Baseball in 1951. The first king was selected to accompany the winner, "Miss Golden Anniversary". The pageant was discarded after 1954, but crowning a king continued. The title was not issued in 2020 after the cancellation of the minor league season due to the COVID-19 pandemic. In 2021, Major League Baseball assumed control of the minor leagues. Subsequently, the committee responsible for the award chose to discontinue the honor.

== Winners ==
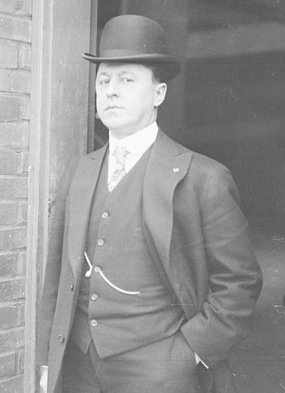
Pants Rowland was selected as the first King of Baseball in 1951.

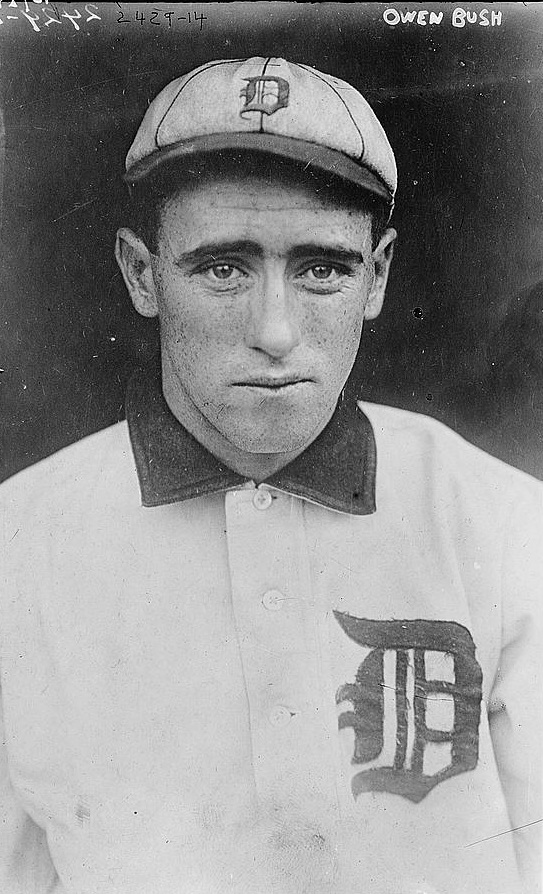
Donie Bush was chosen as 1963's King of Baseball.

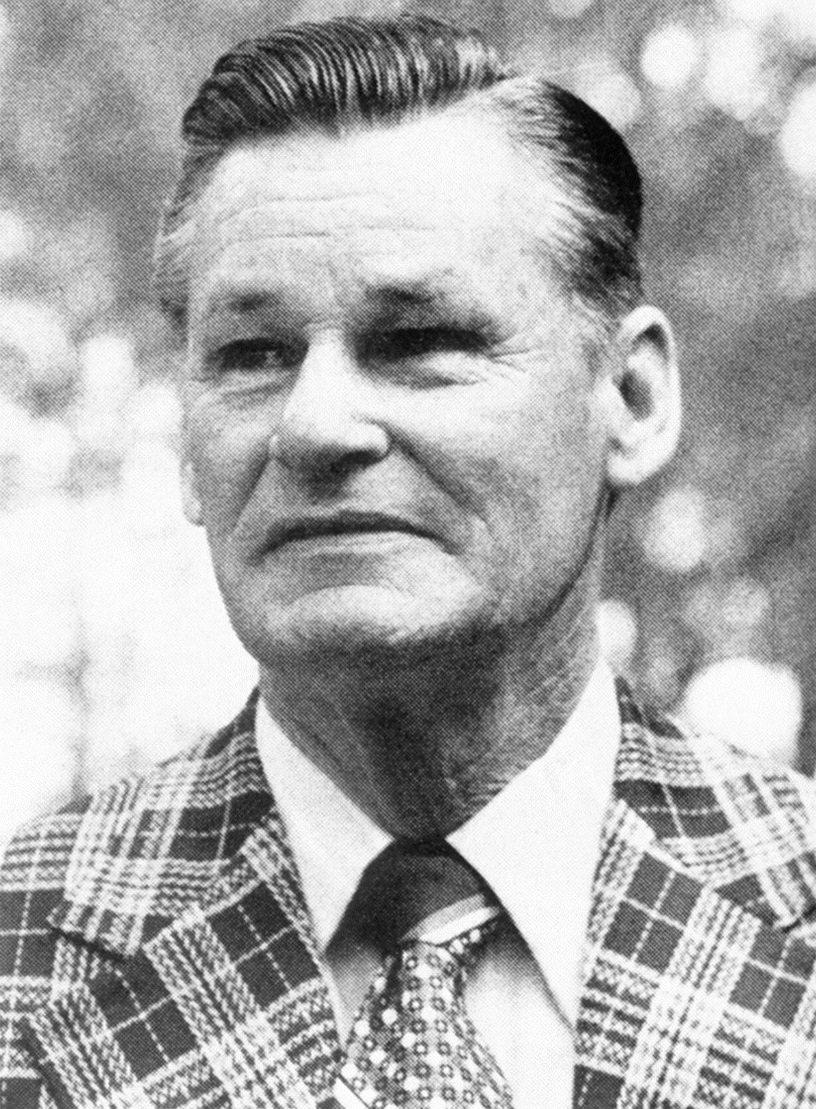
Billy Hitchcock selected as the King of Baseball in 1980.

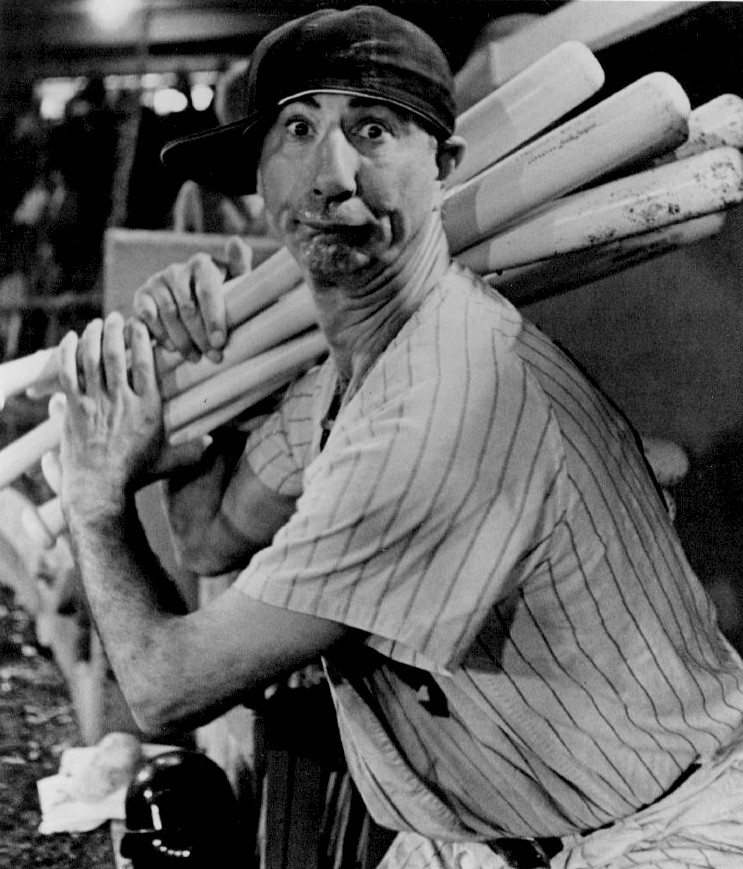
Max Patkin, the "Clown Prince of Baseball," was chosen as King of Baseball in 1988.

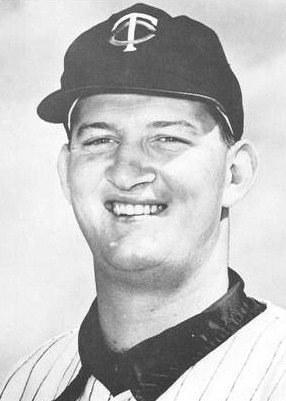
Don Mincher was selected as 2010's King of Baseball.

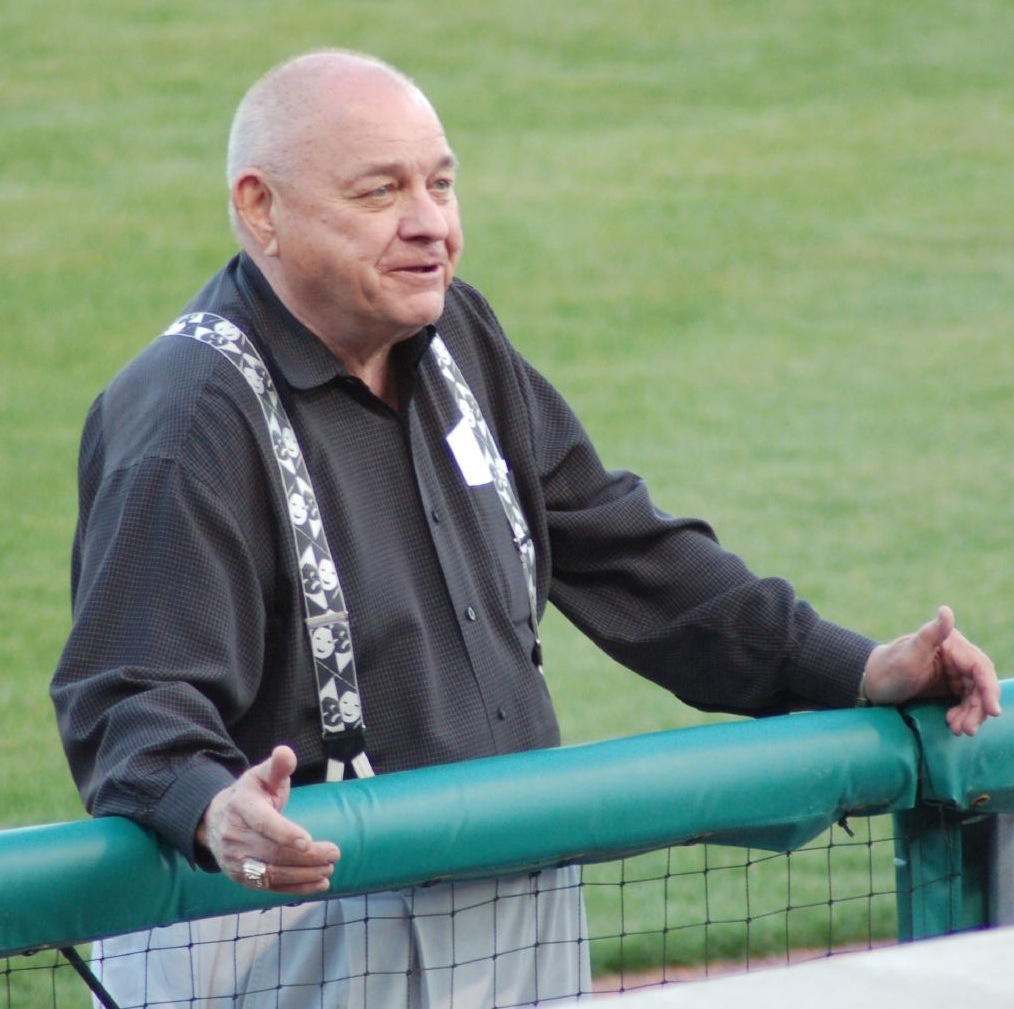
Bill Valentine was chosen as the 2014 King of Baseball.

Winners
| Year | Winner | Winter Meetings site | Ref(s). |
|---|---|---|---|
| 1951 | Pants Rowland | Columbus, Ohio | |
| 1952 | J. Alvin Gardner | Phoenix, Arizona | |
| 1953 | Frank Shaughnessy | Atlanta, Georgia | |
| 1954 | Shelby Pease | Houston, Texas | |
| 1955 | Herman White | Columbus, Ohio | |
| 1956 | Tommy Richardson | Jacksonville, Florida | |
| 1957 | Charles Hurth | Colorado Springs, Colorado | |
| 1958 | None selected | Washington, D.C. | |
| 1959 | Bonneau Peters | St. Petersburg, Florida | |
| 1960 | Joe Engel | Louisville, Kentucky | |
| 1961 | Rosy Ryan | Tampa, Florida | |
| 1962 | Phil Howser | Rochester, New York | |
| 1963 | Donie Bush | San Diego, California | |
| 1964 | Eddie Mulligan | Houston, Texas | |
| 1965 | Ray Winder | Fort Lauderdale, Florida | |
| 1966 | Eddie Leishman | Columbus, Ohio | |
| 1967 | Alejo Peralta | Mexico City, Mexico | |
| 1968 | Dewey Soriano | San Francisco, California | |
| 1969 | Chauncey DeVault | Fort Lauderdale, Florida | |
| 1970 | George MacDonald Sr. | Los Angeles, California | |
| 1971 | Phil Piton | Phoenix, Arizona | |
| 1972 | Vince McNamara | Honolulu, Hawaii | |
| 1973 | Ray Johnston | Houston, Texas | |
| 1974 | Fred Haney | New Orleans, Louisiana | |
| 1975 | Joe Buzas | Hollywood, Florida | |
| 1976 | Don Avery | Los Angeles, California | |
| 1977 | Bill Weiss | Honolulu, Hawaii | |
| 1978 | Zinn Beck | Orlando, Florida | |
| 1979 | Harry Simmons | Toronto, Ontario, Canada | |
| 1980 | Billy Hitchcock | Dallas, Texas | |
| 1981 | Jack Schwarz | Hollywood, Florida | |
| 1982 | Sy Berger | Honolulu, Hawaii | |
| 1983 | Oscar Roettger | Nashville, Tennessee | |
| 1984 | Donald Davidson | Houston, Texas | |
| 1985 | Stan Wasiak | San Diego, California | |
| 1986 | Lefty Gomez | Hollywood, Florida | |
| 1987 | Bill Schweppe | Dallas, Texas | |
| 1988 | Max Patkin | Atlanta, Georgia | |
| 1989 | George Sisler Jr. | Nashville, Tennessee | |
| 1990 | John Henry Moss | Los Angeles, California | |
| 1991 | George Pfister | Miami Beach, Florida | |
| 1992 | Johnny Lipon | Louisville, Kentucky | |
| 1993 | George Kissell | Atlanta, Georgia | |
| 1994 | Jim Bragan | Dallas, Texas | |
| 1995 | Gene DaCosse | Los Angeles, California | |
| 1996 | Sheldon "Chief" Bender | Boston, Massachusetts | |
| 1997 | Max Schumacher | New Orleans, Louisiana | |
| 1998 | Leo Pinckney | Nashville, Tennessee | |
| 1999 | Tom Saffell | Anaheim, California | |
| 2000 | P. Patrick McKernan | Dallas, Texas | |
| 2001 | Roland Hemond | Boston, Massachusetts | |
| 2002 | George Zuraw | Nashville, Tennessee | |
| 2003 | Bob Wilson | New Orleans, Louisiana | |
| 2004 | Dave Rosenfield | Anaheim, California | |
| 2005 | Calvin Falwell | Dallas, Texas | |
| 2006 | Paul Snyder | Lake Buena Vista, Florida | |
| 2007 | Dave Walker | Nashville, Tennessee | |
| 2008 | Pat Gillick | Las Vegas, Nevada | |
| 2009 | Milo Hamilton | Indianapolis, Indiana | |
| 2010 | Don Mincher | Lake Buena Vista, Florida | |
| 2011 | Cuauhtemoc "Chito" Rodriguez | Dallas, Texas | |
| 2012 | George McGonagle | Nashville, Tennessee | |
| 2013 | Charlie Eshbach | Lake Buena Vista, Florida | |
| 2014 | Bill Valentine | San Diego, California | |
| 2015 | William Gladstone | Nashville, Tennessee | |
| 2016 | David Elmore | National Harbor, Maryland | |
| 2017 | Lee Landers | Orlando, Florida | |
| 2018 | Mike Tamburro | Las Vegas, Nevada | |
| 2019 | Bob Lozinak | San Diego, California | |
| 2020 | None selected (season canceled due to COVID-19 pandemic) | | |
