= Gíolla Íosa Mór Mág Tighearnán =

Giolla Íosa Mór Mag Tighearnán (anglicised 'Big' Gilleese McKiernan) was chief of the McKiernan Clan and Baron or Lord of Tullyhunco barony, County Cavan from c. 1269 until his death in 1279.

== Chieftainship ==
Gíolla Íosa became chieftain immediately following the death of Íomhaor Mág Tighearnán, the Second. He resided in the castle of Croaghan of the Cups (Irish: Cruachan O'Cúbhrán), now in the townland of Coolnashinny, which is located beside the modern town of Killeshandra. During Gíolla Íosa's reign, he helped the O'Rourkes capture Cloughoughter Castle from the O'Reillys, although the Sheridan clan recaptured it.

== Death ==
Gíolla Íosa's death was differently described in various annals:

The Annals of Ulster for 1279 states Gilla-Issu mor Mag Tigernain, chief of Tellach Dunchadha and prop of Breifni, rested in Christ.

The Annals of the Four Masters for 1282 states Gilla-Isa Mac Tiernan usually called Gilla-Isa More, Chief of Teallach-Dunchadha, died.

The Annals of Connacht for the year 1282 states Gilla Isa Mag Tigernain, chieftain of the Tellach Dunchada, rested in Christ.

The Annals of Loch Cé for the year 1282 states Gilla-Isa Mac Tighernáin, dux of Teallach-Dunchadha, quievit.

The Annals of Clonmacnoise for 1285 states Gillessa m'Tiernann chief of Teallagh Donnoghaa died.

== Family ==
Gíolla Íosa had a daughter Maoilmheadha Mág Tighearnán, who was the consort of Brian 'Breaghach' Mág Samhradháin, chief of the McGovern Clan of Tullyhaw, County Cavan. Maoilmheadha is referred to in the Book of Magauran at poems 1, 2, 24, 25 and 29. Gíolla Íosa is mentioned at poem 1 in the same book.

Maoilmheadha's children with Brian were Domhnall, Tighearnan, Matha, Donnchadh, Sitriug (d. 1351) and Tomás Mág Samhradháin the Second, who was chief of the McGovern clan until his death in 1340. Maoilmheadha died in 1323 according to the Annals of the Four Masters Maelmeadha, daughter of Mac Tiernan, and wife of Magauran, died.

Preceded by Íomhaor Mág Tighearnán, the Second	Chief of McKiernan Clan; 1269–1279 AD	Succeeded by Duarcán Mág Tighearnán, the Second
