= Tadhg Mág Tighearnán =

Irish clan chief (died 1474)

Tadhg Mág Tighearnán (anglicised Teigue McKiernan) was chief of the McKiernan Clan of Tullyhunco, County Cavan until his death in 1474.

== Chieftainship ==
On the death of the previous chief, Tadhg took the chieftaincy and resided in the castle of Croaghan of the Cups (Irish- Cruachan O'Cúbhrán, now the townland of Croaghan), now in the townland of Coolnashinny, besides the modern town of Killeshandra.

The McKiernan lands of Tullyhunco were on the border between the O’Rourke and O’Reilly lands and both of those clans were attempting to claim overlordship of the McKiernans. In 1470 the O’Rourkes and their allies the O’Donnells, tried to inaugurate Domhnall O’Rourke, who was the O'Rourke chief from 1468 to 1476, in the McKiernan castle of Croaghan but the McKiernans successfully resisted the invasion at Ballyconnell town with the help of the O’Reillys and the English.

The Annals of the Four Masters for 1470 state-

An army was led by O'Donnell and O'Rourke to go upon the hill of Cruachan-Ua Cuproin to inaugurate O'Rourke. O'Reilly, the English, and the people of Teallach-Dunchadha, the Mac Kernans, opposed them at Beal-atha-Chonaill, where Edmond, the son of Hugh O'Reilly, and the son of the Bishop O'Gallagher, were slain, and many men and horses wounded. O'Donnell and his army returned, being prevented from going to Cruachan on this occasion.

The Annals of Connacht for 1470 state-

O Ruairc and O Domnaill raised an army to go to Croaghan to make O Ruairc king. O Raigillig, the Galls and the Tellach Dunchada met them both and the son of Aed O Raigillig and the sons of Bishop O Gallchobair were killed in the fighting and horses and men were wounded. O Domnaill and his army were turned back, and not admitted to Croaghan this time.

The Annals of Ulster for 1470 state-

Ua Domnaill went, with a host, to Bel-atha-Conaill to encounter Ua Raighilligh and there was an engagement between them. And the son of Aedh Ua Raighilligh was slain there, and, on the other side, the son of the bishop Ua Gallcobair was slain there, and horses and persons were killed there. And Ua Domnaill went in triumph to his house on that occasion.

In 1472 the McKiernans were involved in a further conflict with the O’Reilly clan.

The Annals of Connacht for 1472 state-

The posterity of Mathgamain O Raigillig utterly routed the Tellach Dunchada and their allies of Brefne and Muinter Eolais, killing two sons of Ruaidri O Raigillig and many others gentle and simple.

== Death ==
Tadhg died in 1474.

The Annals of Ulster for 1474 state-

Mag Tighernain of Teallach-Dunchadha, namely, Tadhg, died the same year.

Preceded by Cú Connacht Mág Tighearnán	Chief of McKiernan Clan; 14??–1474 AD	Succeeded by John Mág Tighearnán
