= Billy Hitchcock =

American baseball player, manager, and executive (1916–2006)

- Hitchcock as a Detroit Tigers coach in 1957
- Infielder / Manager
- Born: July 31, 1916; Inverness, Alabama, U.S.
- Died: April 9, 2006 (aged 89); Opelika, Alabama, U.S.
- Batted: Right Threw: Right

MLB debut
- April 14, 1942, for the Detroit Tigers

Last MLB appearance
- August 27, 1953, for the Detroit Tigers

MLB statistics
- Batting average: .243
- Home runs: 5
- Runs batted in: 257
- Managerial record: 274–261
- Winning %: .512
- Stats at Baseball Reference
- Managerial record at Baseball Reference

Teams
- As player: Detroit Tigers (1942, 1946); Washington Senators (1946); St. Louis Browns (1947); Boston Red Sox (1948–1949); Philadelphia Athletics (1950–1952); Detroit Tigers (1953); As manager: Detroit Tigers (1960); Baltimore Orioles (1962–1963); Atlanta Braves (1966–1967); As coach: Detroit Tigers (1955–1960); Atlanta Braves (1966)

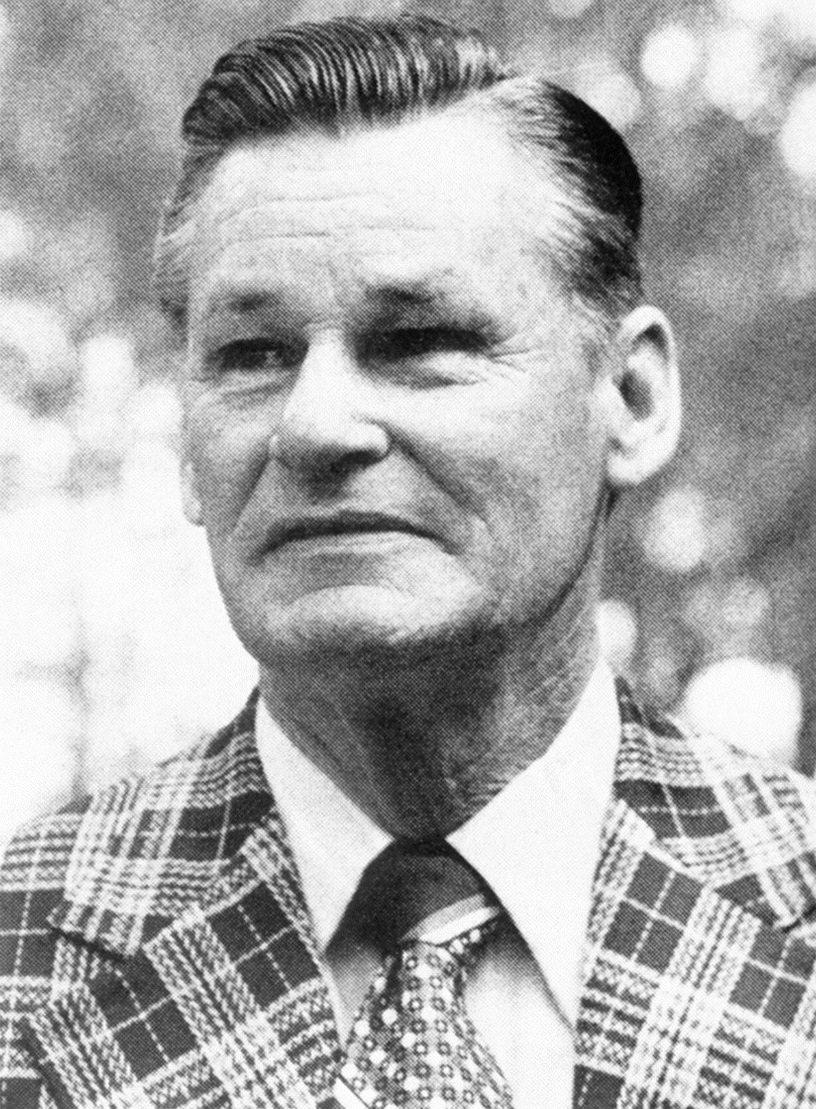
Hitchcock served as president of the Southern League from 1971 to 1980.

William Clyde Hitchcock (July 31, 1916 – April 9, 2006) was an American professional baseball infielder, coach, manager and scout. In Major League Baseball (MLB), he was primarily a third baseman, second baseman and shortstop who appeared in 703 games over nine years with five American League teams. After 18 years as a coach, manager (of the Baltimore Orioles and Atlanta Braves), and scout he became an executive in Minor League Baseball, serving as president of the Double-A Southern League from 1971 to 1980. His older brother, Jimmy Hitchcock, played briefly for the 1938 Boston Bees.

== Playing career ==
Born in Inverness, Alabama and a graduate of Auburn University, Hitchcock played all four infield positions during a nine-year American League active career. The right-handed batter and thrower stood 6 feet 1 inch (1.85 m) tall and weighed 185 pounds (84 kg). He broke in with the 1942 Detroit Tigers, spent three years in the Army Air Force in the Pacific during World War II, and resumed his Major League career from 1946 to 1953. Overall, he batted .243 with 547 hits and five home runs in 703 games with the Tigers, Washington Senators, Boston Red Sox, St. Louis Browns and Philadelphia Athletics.

== Managerial career ==
Between Triple-A managing assignments in 1954 and 1961, Hitchcock served a six-year (1955–60) term as the Tigers' third base coach. He also became a footnote to one of the most bizarre personnel transactions in baseball annals. On August 3, 1960, the Tigers and Cleveland Indians traded their managers, Jimmy Dykes for Joe Gordon. Hitchcock served as Detroit's interim skipper for one game while Gordon was en route from his Cleveland assignment, and the Tigers defeated the New York Yankees, 12–2, on August 3 at Yankee Stadium.

After leading the Vancouver Mounties to a second-place finish in his lone campaign with the Milwaukee Braves minor-league affiliate, Hitchcock succeeded Paul Richards as manager of the Baltimore Orioles on 10 October 1961. But in his two seasons at the helm, the ballclub barely broke the .500 mark (163–161). Hitchcock was dismissed on 29 September after the final game of the 1963 campaign in which the fourth-place Orioles finished 18 1/2 games behind the Yankees, and moved into Baltimore's minor league department as field coordinator. Then he became a scout for the Braves, whose general manager at the time was former Tiger player and executive John McHale.

Hitchcock began the 1966 season as a coach under Bobby Bragan during the Braves' first season in Atlanta. But when they won only 52 of their first 111 games, Bragan was fired on August 9 and Hitchcock took over. The Braves won 33 of their last 51 games to finish fifth in the National League, and Hitchcock was invited back for 1967, but he was fired September 28 of that year with the team in seventh place and three games remaining on the schedule. His career managing record was 274 wins, 261 losses (.514). Hitchcock then scouted for McHale and the Montreal Expos in 1968–71 before taking over as president of the Southern League.

=== Managerial record ===
Team	Year	Regular season					Postseason			
Team	Year	Games	Won	Lost	Win %	Finish	Won	Lost	Win %	Result
DET	1960	1	1	0	1.000	interim	–	–	–	–
DET total		1	1	0	1.000		0	0	–	
BAL	1962	162	77	85	.475	7th in AL	–	–	–	–
BAL	1963	162	86	76	.531	4th in AL	–	–	–	–
BAL total		324	163	161	.503		0	0	–	
ATL	1966	51	33	18	.647	5th in NL	–	–	–	–
ATL	1967	159	77	82	.484	fired	–	–	–	–
ATL total		210	110	100	.524		0	0	–	
Total		535	274	261	–		0	0	–	

== Southern League presidency ==
Hitchcock became president of the Southern League in August 1971. During his presidency, the league added new teams, expanded its playoffs, and introduced split-season play. Other improvements included stadium refurbishments and efforts to make the league more family-friendly. Attendance figures rose dramatically during his tenure, from 333,500 in 1971 to over 1.7 million in 1980. The Southern League championship trophy is named after Hitchcock, and in 1980 he was presented with the King of Baseball award given by Minor League Baseball. He stepped down from the presidency in 1980.

== College athletics ==
In addition to his baseball resume, Hitchcock also made a name for himself in college football and golf. As an All-SEC tailback, he led the Auburn Tigers football program to its first bowl game, a 7–7 tie against Villanova in the Bacardi Bowl, played in Havana on January 1, 1937. Later in life, he established the Billy Hitchcock Golf Tournament at his alma mater. In recognition of his contribution to the school, Auburn renamed its renovated baseball stadium "Hitchcock Field" in 2003. Also in that year, Baseball America named it the best college baseball facility in the country.

== Death ==
Hitchcock died in Opelika, Alabama at age 89.

Preceded by Jack Tighe	Buffalo Bisons manager 1954	Succeeded by Dan Carnevale
Preceded by Johnny Hopp	Detroit Tigers third base coach 1955–1960	Succeeded by Phil Cavarretta
Preceded by George Staller	Vancouver Mounties manager 1961	Succeeded by Jack McKeon
Preceded by Sam C. Smith Jr.	Southern League president 1971–1980	Succeeded by Jim Bragan
