= George Pfister =

American baseball player, coach, and executive (1918-1997)

- Catcher
- Born: September 4, 1918; Bound Brook, New Jersey, U.S.
- Died: August 14, 1997 (aged 78); Somerset, New Jersey, U.S.
- Batted: Right Threw: Right

MLB debut
- September 27, 1941, for the Brooklyn Dodgers

Last MLB appearance
- September 27, 1941, for the Brooklyn Dodgers

MLB statistics
- Games played: 1
- At bats: 2
- Hits: 0
- Stats at Baseball Reference

Teams
- Brooklyn Dodgers (1941)

George Edward Pfister (September 4, 1918 – August 14, 1997) was an American catcher, coach and executive in Major League Baseball. Pfister threw and batted right-handed, stood 6 feet (1.8 m) tall and weighed 200 pounds (91 kg) during his playing career (1939–1941; 1946–1951; 1953; 1957). He served in the United States Army Air Forces during World War II.

Pfister appeared in one game for the Brooklyn Dodgers during the 1941 season. On September 27, he was hitless in two at bats against Ike Pearson in a 7–3 loss to the Philadelphia Phillies at Ebbets Field. Due to an oversight on the part of the club, Pfister had not signed a contract prior to his appearance, and as a consequence he was omitted from official baseball records for several years. Eventually, his single-game appearance was (and continues to be) reflected in the official records.

Pfister was a coach for the Dodgers in 1952, a minor-league manager in the Brooklyn organization for five seasons between 1948 and 1957, a front office official for minor league clubs, and the farm system director of the New York Yankees from 1965–1974. He spent 23 years working in baseball operations for Major League Baseball. In 1991, Pfister was presented with the King of Baseball award given by Minor League Baseball.

Born in Bound Brook, New Jersey, Pfister died of a heart attack at the age of 78 at Somerset Hospital on August 14, 1997.
