= McKiernan Clan =

Irish group of people

The surname McKiernan (Irish: Mág Tighearnán), is of Irish origin and is found predominantly in County Cavan where it originated.

The Irish name is Mág Tighearnán meaning the Son of Tighearnán. While there are several unrelated McTiernan families, one prominent clan or sept of this name claims descent from one Tighearnán who lived c. 1100 AD. He was descended from the 8th-century Dúnchadh, a descendant of Brión mac Echach Muigmedóin. Dúnchadh gave his name to Teallach Dúnchadha (Irish meaning the Hearth of Dúnchadh), the modern day barony of Tullyhunco in County Cavan. Dúnchadh’s brother was Eochaidh from whom the neighbouring McGovern clan of Tullyhaw barony descend.

There are many variations found in the spelling of the name, all of which are attempts at a phonetic spelling of the Gaelic Mág Tighearnán. The Mág part can be found as Mag, Meg, Mac, Mec, Mc, Ma or M'. The Tighearnán part (which may be attached to or detached from the Mág part and all its variations) can be found as Tighearnán, Thighearnán, Cighearnán, McKiernan, McKernan, McKernon, McKernin, McKeirnan, McKiernen, McKyernan, McTiernan, McTernan, MacKiernan, MacKernan, MacTiernan, MacTernan, Kiernan, Kernan, Tiernan etc.

== Chiefs of the Clan ==
The following is a provisional list of the chiefs of the McKiernan Clan, Barons or Lords of Tullyhunco.

- c.1080-1120 Tighearnán mac Maenuigh, after whom the clan is named and who lived in the townland of Listiernan (meaning the Fort of Tighearnán), parish of Kildallan, barony of Tullyhunco, County Cavan
- c.1120-1160 Amhlaoibh Mág Tighearnán, (i.e. the first chief to bear the name Mág Tighearnán or McKiernan), son of Tighearnán
- c.1160-1200 Gíolla Chríost Mág Tighearnán, son of Amhlaoibh
- c.1200-1231 Íomhaor Mág Tighearnán, the First, son of Gíolla Chríost
- 1231-c.1240 Duarcán Mág Tighearnán, the First, son of Íomhaor the First
- c.1240-1258 Macraith Mág Tighearnán (d.1258), son of Tighearnán son of Conbuidhe
- 1258-c.1269 Íomhaor Mág Tighearnán, the Second, son of Tighearnán
- c.1269-1279 Gíolla Íosa Mór Mág Tighearnán
- 1279-1290 Duarcán Mág Tighearnán, the Second, son of Íomhaor the Second
- 1290-1290 Sithric ‘Carrach-in-Cairn’ Mág Tighearnán, son of Duarcán the Second
- 1290-1311 Matha Mág Tighearnán, grandson of Sithric
- 1311-1312 Domhnall ’An Saithnech’ Mág Tighearnán, brother of Matha and Conchobar
- 1312-1314 Conchobar ‘Buidhe’ Mág Tighearnán, brother of Matha and Domhnall
- 1314-1358 Tomás Mág Tighearnán, brother of Matha and Domhnall
- 1358-1362 Brian Mág Tighearnán, son of Matha
- 1362-1383 Fergal Mág Tighearnán the First, son of Tomás
- 1383-1412 Cú Connacht Mág Tighearnán, son of Tomás
- 14??-1474 Tadhg Mág Tighearnán
- 14??-1499 John Mág Tighearnán, the First
- 1499-1512 William Mág Tighearnán
- 1512-1523 Fergal Mág Tighearnán, the Second, great-grandson of Brian
- 15??-1588 Fergal Mág Tighearnán, the Third
- 1588-1622 Brian 'Bán' Mág Tighearnán
- 1641-1657 John Mág Tighearnán, the Second

== See also ==
- McKernan (surname)
- McKiernan
- McTiernan
- McTernan
- Kiernan
- Kernan (disambiguation)
- Tiernan
