= Inverness, Bullock County, Alabama =

Unincorporated community in Alabama, United States

Inverness, Alabama
- Unincorporated community
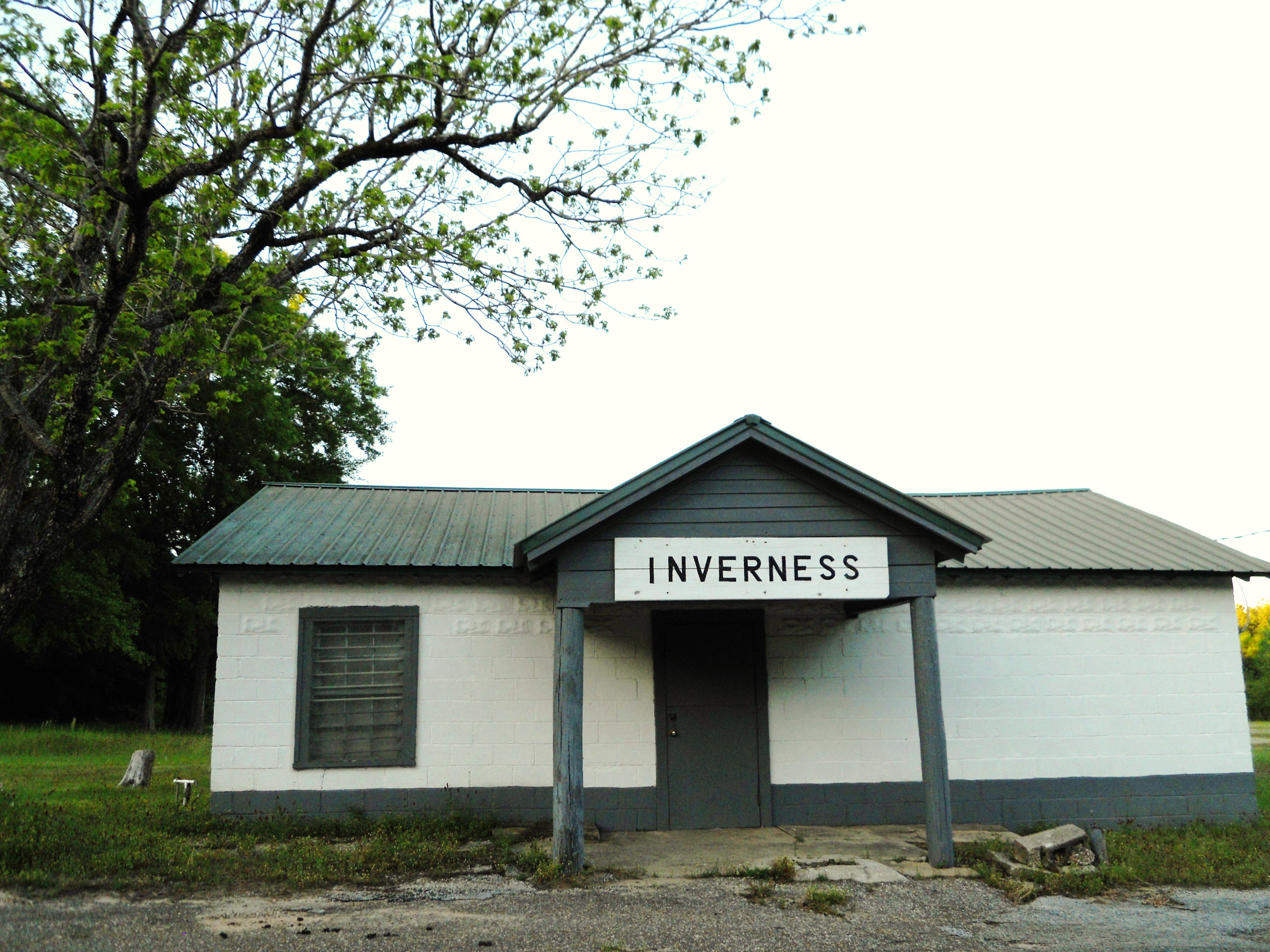
- Inverness, Alabama

- Location within Alabama Location within the United States
- Coordinates: 32°00′54″N 85°44′46″W
- Country: United States
- State: Alabama
- County: Bullock
- Elevation: 427 ft (130 m)
- Time zone: UTC-6 (Central (CST))
  - Summer (DST): UTC-5 (CDT)
- Area code: 334
- GNIS feature ID: 155113

Inverness is an unincorporated community in Bullock County in the U.S. state of Alabama.

Inverness is located at 32°00′54″N 85°44′46″W, south of Union Springs. According to the United States Geological Survey, variant names are Thomas Station and Thomasville.

== Notable people ==
- Billy Hitchcock, born in Inverness, major league baseball player, graduate of Auburn University
- Jimmy Hitchcock, born in Inverness, major league baseball player, graduate of Auburn
