= Tiernan =

Tiernan (Irish: MacTiarnaigh or Ó Tiarnáin; also spelled Tirnan, Tierney) is an Irish surname. Tiernan is also an anglicisation of Tiarnán, a given name derived from the Irish word tiarna "lord" + -án (diminutive suffix).

== As surname ==
Notable people with the surname Tiernan include:

- Andrew Tiernan (born 1965), English actor
- Bob Tiernan, American politician
- Caleb Tiernan (born 2003), American football player
- Cate Tiernan (born 1961), pen name of Gabrielle Charbonnet, American author
- Dan Tiernan (born 1996), English stand-up comedian
- Fergus Tiernan (born 1982), Scottish football midfielder
- Frances Christine Fisher Tiernan (1846–1920), pen name "Christian Reid", American novelist, author
- Greg Tiernan (born 1965), Irish-born-Canadian-based animator, director, voice actor
- Jonathan Tiernan-Locke (born 1984), British cyclist
- Mary Spear Nicholas Tiernan (1835–1891), American writer
- Mike Tiernan (1867–1918), American professional baseball player
- Patrick Tiernan (born 1994), Australian runner
- Robert Tiernan (1929–2014), American lawyer, politician
- Sonja Tiernan, Irish historian
- Tommy Tiernan (born 1969), Irish comedian, actor, writer, presenter

== As forename ==
Notable people with the forename Tiernan include:

- Tiernan Brady, Irish-Australian LGBT rights campaigner
- Tiernan Killeen (born 2003), Irish hurler
- Tiernan McCann (born 1991), Irish Gaelic footballer
- Tiernan O'Halloran (born 1991), Irish rugby player

== See also ==
- McKiernan Clan
- McKernan (surname)
- Tiernan, Oregon, named for R. Tiernan
- McKiernan
- McTiernan
- McTernan
- Kiernan
- Kernan (disambiguation)
