= McTiernan =

McTiernan is a surname. Notable people with the surname include:

- Dervla McTiernan, Irish crime novelist
- Edward McTiernan (1892–1990), Australian jurist, lawyer and politician
- John McTiernan (born 1951), American film director and producer

== See also ==
- Alannah MacTiernan (born 1953), Australian politician
- McKiernan Clan
- McKernan (surname)
- McKiernan
- McTernan
- Kernan (disambiguation)
- Tiernan
