= P. Patrick McKernan =

American baseball executive (1941–2001)

P. Patrick McKernan (April 19, 1941 – July 10, 2001) was an executive in Minor League Baseball. He served as president of the Double-A Eastern League from 1974 to 1982 as well as president and general manager of the Albuquerque Dukes from 1979 to 2000.

McKernan received the John P. McPhail Trophy for best minor league executive twice, making him the only two-time winner. He also won The Sporting News Minor League Executive of the Year Award on two occasions and was a three-time recipient of the Pacific Coast League Executive of the Year Award (1981, 1982, and 1991). In 2000, he was named the King of Baseball at the annual Minor League Baseball winter meetings. He is a member of the New Mexico Sports Hall of Fame in Albuquerque, the Albuquerque Baseball Hall of Fame, and the Unico of Pittsfield Berkshire County Baseball Hall of Fame.

Along with Senator Pete Domenici, he created the "Cool Yule" party to help Albuquerque's disadvantaged youth celebrate Christmas.
