= Uilliam Mág Tighearnán =

William Mág Tighearnán (anglicised William McKiernan) was chief of the McKiernan Clan of Tullyhunco, County Cavan from 1499 until his death in 1512.

== Chieftainship ==
On the death of the previous chief, John Mág Tighearnán in 1499, William took the chieftaincy and resided in the castle of Croaghan of the Cups (Irish- Cruachan O'Cúbhrán), now in the townland of Coolnashinny, besides the modern town of Killeshandra.

== Death ==
William died in 1512.

The Annals of the Four Masters for 1512 state-

Mac Tiernan of Teallach-Dunchadha (William) died.

| Preceded by John Mág Tighearnán | Chief of McKiernan Clan; 1499–1512 AD | Succeeded by Fergal Mág Tighearnán, the Second |
