= John Mág Tighearnán (died 1657) =

John Mág Tighearnán, the Second (anglicised John McKiernan) was chief of the McKiernan Clan of Tullyhunco, County Cavan, Ireland, including the period 1641 to 1657.

== Chieftainship ==
After the Ulster Plantation, The McKiernan castle at Croaghan, now in the townland of Coolnashinny, had been granted to Sir James Craig and John then lived in the townland of Anaigh.

== 1641 Rebellion ==
John joined the Irish Rebellion of 1641 against British rule and he led the McKiernan forces in the wars that followed.

County Cavan depositions

The surviving British settlers later made depositions about the rebels activities, some of which mentioned John and the other McKiernans.

Thomas Jones and William Jones of Cornacrum stated:

A note of the names of them which we knowe of our owne knowledge to be pillagers of the brittish in the County of Cauan.. John Kernan of Anaigh

== Siege of Croaghan and Keilagh ==
The castles of Croaghan and Keelagh, Killeshandra belonging to Sir James Craig and Sir Francis Hamilton were besieged by the McKiernans along with their allies, the McGoverns and O'Reillys, when the 1641 rebellion started. The inhabitants held out until 15 June 1642 when they surrendered and went to Drogheda.

John Simpson of Killeshandra also made a deposition about the siege of Keelagh:

John Simpson late of Killshandrah in the County of Cavan gent, (Lieutenant to Sir ffrancis Hamilton knight and Barronet) aged about 39 yeres: sworne and examined before his Maiesties Commissioners deposeth and saith That he this deponent was with the said Sir ffrancis Hamilton in his Castle of Kyloghe in the same County all the time from the beginning of the present Rebellion vntill that the said Sir ffrancis did take quarter from the Rebells which was about the 4th of June 1642 And saith that when hee tooke quarter which was about the same tyme he He this deponent very well remembreth that certeine Articles were made perfected and sworne vnto by Phillip Mc Hugh ô Rely Esquire Phillip mc Mulmore ô Rely Esquire Edmund ô Rely Esquire James Newgent Esquire Richard Ash Esquire <a> Myles Rely Esquire John Kernon gent Hugh Booy o Rely gentleman Charles Mc Gowran gent all Rebells and divers others of the Irish gentrymen In and by which Articles those Rebells aforenamed agreed Covenanted and bound themselues that the Castle of the said Sir ffrancis Hamilton: And alsoe the Cast{le} of the said Sir James Craige knight together with the gardens and orchards thereunto belonging should not be broken downe demolished burned or spoiled in any manner whatsoeuer But that they would putt safegards into the Castles for preserving of them and their gardens and orchards....

When Croaghan and Keelagh surrendered, John McKiernan was one of the signatories to the surrender agreement:

Articles of agreement concluded and agreed upon, the quarter give by Philip Mac Hugh Mac Shan Rely, and the rest of the gentlemen hereunder named to Sir Francis Hamilton concerning the castles of Kylagh and Crohan, in manner and forme following, bearing date the fourth of June 1642. In primis, it is agreed by, and between these parties following, viz. Sir Francis Hamilton Knight and Baronet, in the behalfe of the Lady Mary Craige, himselfe, the gentlemen, gentlewomen, souldiers, and all others both men, women and children, of what degree, condition, or quality whatsoever, belonging unto, or being in either of both castles, viz. Kylagh and Crohan, shall have safe quarter from Philip Mac Hugh Relie, Edmond Relie, Philip Mac Mulmore Relie, Mulmore Mac Edmond Relie, Hugh Buii Relie, John Mac Philip Relie, Philip Roe Relie, James Neugent, R. A., Owen Rourke Esquires, Edmond Mac Owen Relie, Ferall Oge Relie, Charles Mac Gauran, Daniel Mac Gauran, John Mac Kernan, Conner Relie, Tirlagh Relie, and Cahil Relie, to bee convoyed to Doghedah with saftie of their lives, and of their bag and baggage, which they shall carry with them and that such persons above named as are herein mentioned by particular name....Lastly, for the due and true performance of this agreement and every point therein contained, both parties shall make choyce of the most principall gentlemen on either side to sweare that they will truly and faithfully performe according to this agreement, and every point therein contained, and likewise set their hands and seales the day and yeere above written- Philip Relie, Edmond Rely, Philip Rely, Mulmore Rely, Hugh Rely, John Rely, Philip Rely, James Neugent, R.A., Owen Rourke, Edmond Rely, Ferall Rely, Charles Mac Gauran, Daniel Mac Gauran, John Mac Kernan, Conner Rely, Mulmore Relie, Turlagh Relie.

== Siege of Clonmel ==
During the Cromwellian conquest of Ireland, the Clonmel garrison changed as the arrival of the Puritan army through Kilkenny became imminent. In November 1649, the town's mayor, John Bennet White, wrote to the Duke of Ormond seeking military assistance. Colonel Oliver Stephenson and part of the old Confederate army, mostly from County Clare, took up quarters. However these southern Confederates were not fully trusted by the townspeople, particularly after the fall of Carrick on Suir due to treachery. Ormond arrived in person at the end of the month and the Clare men were replaced by experienced soldiers from Ulster under Hugh Dubh O'Neill, a veteran of siege warfare in the Thirty Years' War. Under his command were 1,500 soldiers from the Irish Ulster army, mostly from the modern counties of Tyrone and Cavan. Included in O'Neill's command was a regiment commanded by Colonel Philip O'Reilly. A muster of these troops took place at Clonmel on 3 January 1650 and one of O'Reilly's companies was led by Captain Cú Connacht Mág Tighearnán. The muster reads-

(16) Captain Coochonaght McKearnan's company, consisting of Captain, Lieutenant, Ensign, one Sargent, one drum, three Corporalls, 13 Musketteers 35 pikemen, and 8 unarmed men, present; 6 sick by certificate, and one Sargent prisoner with the enemy, as the Captain protesteth.

Oliver Cromwell besieged the town in April 1650. He knew that O'Neill's garrison and supplies were severely depleted and planned to try a fresh assault with close artillery support to batter the town and its defenders. O'Neill's men were out of ammunition and slipped away under cover of darkness – making their way to Waterford. Clonmel was then surrendered to Cromwell.

Preceded by Brian 'Bán' Mág Tighearnán	Chief of McKiernan Clan -1641–-1657 AD	Succeeded by none
