= McKernon =

McKernon may refer to:

- Craig McKernon (born 1968), British footballer
- Jamie McKernon (born 1992), British footballer
