= Joe Kernan =

Joe Kernan or Joseph Kernan may refer to:

- Joe Kernan (baseball), 19th-century American baseball player
- Joe Kernan (Gaelic footballer) (born 1954)
- Joe Kernan (politician) (1946–2020), American politician
- Joseph D. Kernan (born 1955), United States Navy admiral

== See also ==
- Joe Kernen (born 1956), American news anchor on CNBC
