= John Mág Tighearnán =

Irish clan chief

John Mág Tighearnán, the First, (anglicised John McKiernan) was chief of the McKiernan Clan of Tullyhunco, County Cavan until his death in 1499.

== Chieftainship ==
On the death of the previous chief, John took the chieftaincy and resided in the castle of Croaghan of the Cups (Irish- Cruachan O'Cúbhrán), now in the townland of Coolnashinny, beside the later town of Killeshandra.

In 1495 a relative died. The Annals of Ulster for 1495 state-

Mag Tighernain ‘Ichtarach’, namely, Gormgal, son of Brian Mag Tigernain, died

== Death ==
John died in 1499. The Annals of Ulster for 1499 state-

Mag Tighernain of Tellach-Dunchadha, namely, John Mag Tighernain, died this year.

Preceded by Tadhg Mág Tighearnán	Chief of McKiernan Clan; 14??–1499 AD	Succeeded by William Mág Tighearnán
