= Catherine Kernan =

American artist

- Born: 1948 (age 76–77); Cooperstown, NY

Catherine Kernan (born 1948) is an American artist. Her work is included in the collections of the Smithsonian American Art Museum, the Detroit Institute of Arts, the Museum of Fine Arts, Boston and the Cleveland Museum of Art.
