= Sithric "Carrach in Cairn" Mág Tighearnán =

Sithric 'Carrach-in-Cairn' Mág Tighearnán (anglicised Sitric 'the Scabbed of Carn' McKiernan) was chief of the McKiernan Clan and Baron or Lord of Tullyhunco barony, County Cavan in the year 1290.

== Ancestry ==
Sithric was the son of Duarcán Mág Tighearnán, the Second (d.1290), son of Íomhaor Mág Tighearnán, the Second (died c.1269), son of Tighearnán, son of Duarcán the First, son of Íomhaor the First, son of Gíolla Chríost, son of Amhlaoibh, son of Tighearnán, the founder of the clan. His father Duarcán had been a previous chief of the clan.

== Description ==
Sithric's nickname Carrach-in-Cairn meant he had a scabbed, mangy or bald head or rough-faced and lived in Carn, Tullyhunco townland before becoming chief.

== Chieftainship ==
On the death of the previous chief, his father Duarcán Mág Tighearnán, the Second in 1290, Sithric took the chieftaincy and resided in the castle of Croaghan of the Cups (Irish- Cruachan O'Cúbhrán), now in the townland of Coolnashinny, besides the modern town of Killeshandra.

== Death ==
Sithric died in 1290 shortly after succeeding to the chieftaincy but some of the annals give a later date.

The Annals of Ulster for 1290 state

Carrach-in-cairn Mag Tigernain, chief of Tellach-Dunchadha, rested in Christ.

The Annals of Connacht for the year 1293/4 state-

Two chieftains of Tullyhunco died this year, Duarcan and Sitrecc [Mag Tigernain]. Carrach in Chairn Mag Tigernain, chieftain of Tullyhunco, died.

The Annals of Loch Cé for the year 1293/4 state-

Two chieftains of Tellach-Dunchadha died in hoc anno. Carrach-in-chairn Mac Tighernáin, chieftain of Tellach-Dunchadha, mortuus est.

== Family ==
Sithric had a son Gíolla Íosa 'Leith' Mág Tighearnán.

Preceded by Duarcán Mág Tighearnán, the Second	Chief of McKiernan Clan; 1290–1290 AD	Succeeded by Matha Mág Tighearnán
