= Duarcán mac Íomhaor Mág Tighearnán =

Chief of the McKiernan Clan from 1279 to 1290

Duarcán Mág Tighearnán, the Second (anglicised Durcan McKiernan) was chief of the McKiernan Clan and Baron or Lord of Tullyhunco barony, County Cavan from 1279 until his death in 1290.

== Ancestry ==
Duarcán was the son of Íomhaor Mág Tighearnán, the Second (died c.1269), son of Tighearnán, son of Duarcán the First, son of Íomhaor the First, son of Gíolla Chríost, son of Amhlaoibh, son of Tighearnán, the founder of the clan. His father Íomhaor had been a previous chief of the clan.

== Chieftainship ==
On the death of the previous chief, Gíolla Íosa Mór Mág Tighearnán in 1279, Duarcán took the chieftaincy and resided in the castle of Croaghan of the Cups (Irish- Cruachan O'Cúbhrán), now in the townland of Coolnashinny, besides the modern town of Killeshandra.

== Death ==
Duarcán died in 1290 but some of the annals give a later date.

The Annals of Ulster for 1290 state

Duarcan Mac Tigernain, chief of Tellach-Dunchadha, rested in Christ.

The Annals of the Four Masters for 1294 state-

Duarcan Mac-Tiernan, Lord, or Chieftain, of Teallach Dunchadha, died.

The Annals of Connacht for the year 1293 state-

Two chieftains of Tullyhunco died this year, Duarcan and Sitrecc [Mag Tigernain].

The Annals of Loch Cé for the year 1293 state-

Two chieftains of Tellach-Dunchadha died in hoc anno.

== Family ==
Duarcán had a son Sithric Mág Tighearnán, who succeeded him as chief of the clan.

Preceded by Gíolla Íosa Mór Mág Tighearnán	Chief of McKiernan Clan; 1279–1290 AD	Succeeded by Sithric ‘Carrach-in-Cairn’ Mág Tighearnán
