= Íomhaor mac Tighearnán Mág Tighearnán =

Chief of the McKiernan Clan

Íomhaor mac Tighearnán Mág Tighearnán (anglicised Ivor McKiernan) was chief of the McKiernan Clan and Baron or Lord of Tullyhunco (Middle Irish: Teallach Dunchadha) barony, County Cavan from 1258 until his death c.1269.

== Ancestry ==
Íomhaor was the son of Tighearnán who was son of Duarcán, son of Íomhaor, son of Gíolla Chríost, son of Amhlaoibh, son of Tighearnán, the eponym.

== Chieftainship ==
On the death of the previous chief, Macraith Mág Tighearnán, Íomhaor took the chieftaincy and resided in the castle of Croaghan of the Cups (Middle Irish: Cruachan O Cúbhrán), now in the townland of Coolnashinny, besides the modern town of Killeshandra. Macraith had been killed in 1258 by Domnall O'Ruairc (son of Conchobar son of Tigernán), king of Breifne from 1258 to 1258, and the McKiernans soon took their revenge. Domnall and his brother Muirchertach were killed by the Teallach Dunchadha in 1260. Royal Inauguration in Gaelic Ireland C. 1100-1600: A Cultural Landscape Study By Elizabeth FitzPatrick, p. 212

Preceded by Macraith Mág Tighearnán	Chief of McKiernan Clan; 1258–1269 AD	Succeeded by Gíolla Íosa Mór Mág Tighearnán
