= Annals of Loch Cé =

Irish annals covering the years 1014 to 1590

- Publication place: Ireland

The Annals of Loch Cé (also Annals of Lough Cé) cover events, mainly in Connacht and its neighbouring regions, from 1014 to 1590. It takes its name from Lough Cé in the kingdom of Moylurg – now north County Roscommon – which was the centre of power of the Clan MacDermot. In the sixteenth century, King Brian MacDermot commissioned the Annals of Loch Ce, which remain among the most important written records of medieval Irish history. For its earliest centuries it used, among others, the Annals of Boyle.

The largest part of the Annals are attributed to members of Clan Ó Duibhgeannáin, with some emendations by the patron, Brian na Carraige MacDermot, first MacDermot of the Carrick (died 1592). The text is in Early Modern Irish, with a portion of the text in Latin.

4 December 2021 the tradition of Irish Annals writing was revived by a calligrapher, scribe and paper/ ink maker. As the Annals of Loch Cé were the endpoint in the Vulgate tradition of annals-writing in Ireland, the team chose to bring copies of the parchments of their latter-day annals by boat to Holy Trinity Island on the lake, where the Premonstratensians had concluded their annals in 1590. This revised annal is called De Réir Book of Moytura, now in its third year of keeping track of local, national and earth-wide goings-on.

== See also ==
- Irish annals
