= Annals of Connacht =

- Subject: Medieval Ireland
- Publication place: Ireland

The Annals of Connacht (Annála Connacht), covering the years 1224 to 1544, are drawn from a manuscript compiled in the 15th and 16th centuries by at least three scribes, all believed to be members of the Clan Ó Duibhgeannáin.

The early sections, commencing with the death of King Cathal Crobdearg Ua Conchobair of Connacht, are exceptionally detailed and give a good account of Connacht affairs during the 13th and early to mid-14th century, particularly for the families of O'Conor and Burke. The accounts however become more desultory, especially for the 16th century. Nevertheless, it is an invaluable document relating much that would have otherwise remained utterly obscure or unknown in the history of Connacht, and Ireland in general.

A comparison between it and the Annals of Clonmacnoise reveal a common source, or perhaps one is a partial copy of the other.

== See also ==
- Irish annals
