= 1350 in Ireland =

- Centuries: 12th; 13th; 14th; 15th; 16th
- Decades: 1330s; 1340s; 1350s; 1360s; 1370s
- See also: Other events of 1350; List of years in Ireland

Events from the year 1350 in Ireland.

== Incumbent ==
- Lord: Edward III

== Events ==
- Brian Bán Ó Briain, King of Thomond, is killed; restoration of Diarmaid mac Toirdhealbach (see 1343 in Ireland).
- Aodh mac Aodh Bréifneach, last of Clann Mhuircheartaigh sept of O'Connors to hold kingship of Connacht (see 1342 and 1343 in Ireland), is killed by Aodh Bán Ó Ruairc.
- Aodh, son of Toirdhealbhach Ó Conchobhair, King of Connacht, is deposed by Edmond Albanach de Burgh in favor of his cousin, Aodh mac Feidhlimidh Ó Conchobhair.
- The Yorkshireman John de St Paul, Archbishop of Dublin, is appointed as Lord Chancellor of Ireland by King Edward III of England.
- 25 June – Great council at Kilkenny.

== Deaths ==
- Uilliam Ó Dubhda, Bishop of Killala
