= 1349 in Ireland =

- Centuries: 12th; 13th; 14th; 15th; 16th
- Decades: 1320s; 1330s; 1340s; 1350s; 1360s
- See also: Other events of 1349; List of years in Ireland

Events from the year 1349 in Ireland.

== Incumbent ==
- Lord: Edward III

== Events ==
- Christmas to March – the Black Death: "The pestilence gathered strength in Kilkenny during Lent ... there was scarcely a house in which only one died."
- Flaithbheartach Domnall Carrach Ó Ruairc deposed from kingship of West Bréifne.
- In the dispute over the Primacy of Ireland, Richard FitzRalph, Archbishop of Armagh, acting on letters of King Edward III of England specifically allowing him to do so, enters Dublin "with the cross erect before him". He is opposed by the prior of Kilmainham on the instructions of Alexander de Bicknor, Archbishop of Dublin, and forced to withdraw to Drogheda.

== Deaths ==
- After June – Friar John Clyn.
- 14 July – Alexander de Bicknor, Archbishop of Dublin.
- Risdeard mac Giolla Iosa Ruaidh Ó Raghallaigh, Lord of East Breifne.
