= 1346 in Ireland =

- Centuries: 12th; 13th; 14th; 15th; 16th
- Decades: 1320s; 1330s; 1340s; 1350s; 1360s
- See also: Other events of 1346; List of years in Ireland

Events from the year 1346 in Ireland.

== Incumbent ==
- Lord: Edward III

== Events ==
- 16 April – after this date, John de Carew renovates and repairs Balymotha/Clerevoyse castle [1]
- "At this time the whole of the Irish of Leinster placed themselves at war against the English and the peaceful people, burning, plundering and killing whomsoever they were able, sparing neither churches nor sacred places nor vestments. On the contrary they plundered and burnt churches and cemeteries in various places, like the church of Duleek and Fennor and Cloghan et cetera." [2].
- 23 April (until April 29) – the castles of Lea, Kilmohide and Balylethan in Leinster captured by Uí Mhórdha, Uí Chonchobair (Ó Conchubhair Fáilghe) and Uí Dhíomusaigh [3].
- 4 May – the above castles "broken" by the above on this date [4].
- 5 May – "The one eyed Diarmaid Mac Giollaphádraig ... aided by the Uí Céarbhail ... burned the town of Aghaboe and the cemetery and church and cruelly forsaking St. Canice, abbot, patron of the neighbourhood and found of the place, he, like a degenerate son to his father, burnt and completely destroyed with the crullest fire, the saint's shrine with his bones and relics." [5].
- June – Lord Walter de Bermingham, arrived in Ireland as its new Justiciar. [6].
- 24 June – "Around the Feast of the Baptist, four hundred of the men of Uriel and Dundalk were killed by the Irish." [7].
- 27 July – Roger de la Freigne, Sheriff of Kilkenny, "seized a great prey over Cearbhall Mac Giollaphádraig and over his men such as had rearely been taken in those parts, remembered by men for many years." [8].
- 9 September – Thadhg mac Ruaidhrí Ó Céarbhaill, princeps of Ely O'Carrol, a powerful, wealthy, rich and warlike man, a particular persecutor and enemy of the English and faithful subjects, was killed by Lord Fulk de la Freigne. He (Ó Céarbhaill) killed, exiled and ejected from his lands of Ely O'Carroll those of the nation of de Barry, de Milleborne, de Brit and other English of the neighbourhood, and he took and occupied their lands and castles, being an oppressive tyrant to all faithful subjects nearby. On the same day Ruaidhrí, son of Ó Mórdha was captured by the same. Nicholas le Grasse was killed." [9].
- 23 November – "Around the Feast of St. Clement, thirty menn of the Dhíomusaigh were killed at Ardscull by two men, Thomas Wogan and Walter Lenfaunt." [10].
- Uilliam Ó Dubhda became Bishop of Killala

== Unknown Date ==
- Battle of Calry Lough Gill.
- "In that winter there was a war between the English, namely W[alter] de Bermingham, and the Earl of Kildare, and Uí Mhórdha and Uí Dhíomusaigh, and they attacked and burnt their lands; they killed few men however." [11].

== Deaths ==
- 8 April – Maurice Fitz Phillip dies imprisoned at Dublin Castle. [12].
- 9 April – Ralph de Ufford, Justicier of Ireland, dies at Kilmainham. [13].
- 21 April – Diarmaid Ó Díomusaigh killed by Sir Robert Fitz Maurice. [14].
- June/July – Lord John fitz George de Roche "killed by the Ketyngs (Keatings) and the Hodintes." [15].
- Winter 1346 – Adam Northapton, Bishop of Ferns. [16].
- Ualgarg Mór Ó Ruairc, King of West Breifne dies in Calry, County Sligo. [17].
