= McCurn =

McCurn is a surname. Notable people with the surname include:

- George McCurn (1920–1985), American singer
- Neal Peters McCurn (1926–2014), American jurist

== See also ==
- McGurn
