= James Bermingham =

Irish bishop

James Bermingham was Bishop of Killala from 1344 to 1346.

Catholic Church titles
| Preceded by John Tankard | Bishop of Killala; 1344–1346 | Succeeded by Uilliam Ó Dubhda |
