= 1349 =

1349 in various calendars
- Gregorian calendar: 1349; MCCCXLIX
- Ab urbe condita: 2102
- Armenian calendar: 798; ԹՎ ՉՂԸ
- Assyrian calendar: 6099
- Balinese saka calendar: 1270–1271
- Bengali calendar: 755–756
- Berber calendar: 2299
- English Regnal year: 22 Edw. 3 – 23 Edw. 3
- Buddhist calendar: 1893
- Burmese calendar: 711
- Byzantine calendar: 6857–6858
- Chinese calendar: 戊子年 (Earth Rat); 4046 or 3839 — to — 己丑年 (Earth Ox); 4047 or 3840
- Coptic calendar: 1065–1066
- Discordian calendar: 2515
- Ethiopian calendar: 1341–1342
- Hebrew calendar: 5109–5110
- Hindu calendars
- Vikram Samvat: 1405–1406
- Shaka Samvat: 1270–1271
- Kali Yuga: 4449–4450
- Holocene calendar: 11349
- Igbo calendar: 349–350
- Iranian calendar: 727–728
- Islamic calendar: 749–750
- Japanese calendar: Jōwa 5 (貞和５年)
- Javanese calendar: 1261–1262
- Julian calendar: 1349; MCCCXLIX
- Korean calendar: 3682
- Minguo calendar: 563 before ROC 民前563年
- Nanakshahi calendar: −119
- Thai solar calendar: 1891–1892
- Tibetan calendar: ས་ཕོ་བྱི་བ་ལོ་ (male Earth-Rat); 1475 or 1094 or 322 — to — ས་མོ་གླང་ལོ་ (female Earth-Ox); 1476 or 1095 or 323

Year 1349 (MCCCXLIX) was a common year starting on Thursday of the Julian calendar.

== Events ==
=== January–December ===
- January 22 – An earthquake affects L'Aquila in southern Italy with a maximum Mercalli intensity of X (Extreme), causing severe damage, and leaving 2,000 dead.
- January 30 – Günther von Schwarzburg is elected Holy Roman Emperor
- February 14 – Jewish persecutions during the Black Death: Strasbourg massacre – Because they are believed by the residents to be the cause of the Black Death, roughly 2,000 Jews are burned to death.
- February 19 – Jewish persecutions during the Black Death: The entire Jewish community in the remote German village of Saulgau is wiped out.
- March 21 – Jewish persecutions during the Black Death: Erfurt massacre – The Jewish community of Erfurt (Germany) is murdered and expelled in a pogrom.
- March 27 – An earthquake in England strikes Meaux Abbey.
- May – The Black Death ceases in Ireland.
- May 28 – In Breslau, Silesia, 60 Jews are murdered following a disastrous fire which destroys part of the city.
- June 17 – Charles IV is re-elected as Holy Roman Emperor following the death of his rival Günther.
- August 24 – The Black Death breaks out in Elbing (Poland).
- September 9 – 1349 Apennine earthquakes. An earthquake in Rome causes extensive damage, including the collapse of the southern exterior facade of the Colosseum.
- October 20 – Pope Clement VI publishes a papal bull that condemns the Flagellants.
- November 8 – Ibn Battuta arrives in Fez, Morocco.
- November 17 – Pope Clement VI annuls the marriage of William Montacute, 2nd Earl of Salisbury, and Joan of Kent, on the grounds of her prior marriage to Thomas Holland, 1st Earl of Kent.
- December 22 – The rise of Alexios III of Trebizond to the throne ends the Trapezuntine Civil Wars.

=== Ongoing ===
- The Black Death in England spreads to the north and a ship from England carries it to Askøy and Bjørgvin (modern-day Bergen) in Norway. The disease also breaks out in Mecca and is prevalent in the Île-de-France and the Kingdom of Navarre.

== Births ==
- September 9 – Duke Albert III of Austria (d. 1395)
- date unknown
  - Friar John, Minister of the Friars Preachers of Ireland (alive 1405)
  - Venerable Macarius of Yellow Lake and Unzha, semi-legendary Russian saint (d. 1444)

== Deaths ==
- February 26 – Fatima bint al-Ahmar, Nasrid princess in the Emirate of Granada (b. c.1260)
- April 3 – Eudes IV, Duke of Burgundy (b. 1295)
- May 31 – Thomas Wake, English politician (b. 1297)
- June – John Clyn, Irish Franciscan friar and chronicler
- June 14 – Günther von Schwarzburg, German king (b. 1304)
- August 26 – Thomas Bradwardine, Archbishop of Canterbury
- September 11 – Bonne of Luxembourg, queen of John II of France (b. 1315)
- September 30 – Richard Rolle, English religious writer (b. c.1300)
- October 6 – Joan II of Navarre, daughter of Louis X of France (b. 1311)
- October 25 – James III of Majorca (b. 1315)
- November 18 – Frederick II, Margrave of Meissen (b. 1310)
- date unknown – Hamdallah Mustawfi, Persian historian and geographer (b. 1281)
- probable – William of Ockham, English philosopher (b. 1285)
