= McKenney (disambiguation) =

McKenney is a small town in Virginia, United States.

McKenney or McKenny may also refer to:

- McKenney (surname)
- McKenney (bridge), a suit preference signal
- Mount McKenny, a mountain in Antarctica
- McKenny Union, a building of the Eastern Michigan University
- McKenny Baronets, a title in the Baronetage of the United Kingdom, created in 1831
