= 1343 in Ireland =

- Centuries: 12th; 13th; 14th; 15th; 16th
- Decades: 1320s; 1330s; 1340s; 1350s; 1360s
- See also: Other events of 1343; List of years in Ireland

Events from the year 1343 in Ireland.

== Incumbent ==
- Lord: Edward III

== Events ==
- 19 May – Robert Savage is appointed Seneschal of Ulster.
- 26 October – Ferghal mac Diarmata becomes Lord of Moylurg after his brother, Conchobhar Mac Diarmada, dies.
- Muircheartach Ó Briain, King of Thomond, dies. He is succeeded by his brother, Diarmaid, who is expelled by Brian Bán MacDomnaill Ó Briain.
- Toirdhealbhach Ó Conchobhair recovers kingship of Connacht from Aodh mac Aodh Breifneach. He makes peace with Mac Diarmada.
- King Niall Ó Domhnaill of Tir Conaill is deposed by his nephew Aonghus, with the aid and support of O Baoighill, Ó Dochartaigh, the MacSweenys and Aodh Reamhar Ó Neill.
- Clann Mhuircheartaigh is expelled from Bréifne by Ualgarg Mór Ó Ruairc, O Conchobhair, and Tadhg Mag Ragnaill. He is given refuge by King Aonghus of Tír Conaill in Tír Aodha (Tirhugh, County Donegal).
- Clanricarde and de Berminghams invade Uí Maine.
- Maurice Earl of Desmond occupies Imokilly (east County Cork).
- John L'Archers, Prior of the Order of St. John of Jerusalem appointed Lord Chancellor of Ireland

== Deaths ==
- 26 October – Conchobhar Mac Diarmada, Lord of Moylurg;
- Muircheartach Ó Briain, King of Thomond
