= McKegney =

McKegney is a surname. Notable people with the surname include:

- Ian McKegney (born 1947), Canadian ice hockey player
- Tony McKegney (born 1958), Canadian ice hockey player

== See also ==
- McKenney (surname)
