= 1360 in Ireland =

- Centuries: 12th; 13th; 14th; 15th; 16th
- Decades: 1340s; 1350s; 1360s; 1370s; 1380s
- See also: Other events of 1360; List of years in Ireland

Events from the year 1360 in Ireland.

== Incumbent ==
- Lord: Edward III

== Births ==
- Mailin mac Tanaide Ó Maolconaire, Ollamh Síol Muireadaigh

== Deaths ==
- Gilla na Naem Ó Conmaigh, Irish musician
- Richard FitzRalph, Archbishop of Armagh
