= 1344 in Ireland =

- Centuries: 12th; 13th; 14th; 15th; 16th
- Decades: 1320s; 1330s; 1340s; 1350s; 1360s
- See also: Other events of 1344; List of years in Ireland

The following is a list of events that occurred in the year 1344 in Ireland.

== Incumbent ==
- Lord: Edward III

== Events ==
- 10 February – Ralph d'Ufford is appointed Justiciar.
- 20 April – custody of the lands of the late Earl of Ormond is granted to the Earl of Desmond.
- 24 April – the 'Bonnaght', a treaty between Richard, Duke of York, Earl of Ulster and Henry, Son of Eoghan O'Neill, is sanctioned in Ulster.
- 3 June – Justiciar is ordered to resume and regrant all abandoned and waste lands.
- 21 July – Justiciar campaigns in south Leinster and Munster.
- October 21 – Pope Clement VI issues dispensation for marriage between Maurice fitz Thomas FitzGerald, Earl of Kildare, and Joan, daughter of the Earl of Desmond.
- James Bermingham became Bishop of Killala
- John Morice appointed Lord Chancellor of Ireland
