= 1352 in Ireland =

- Centuries: 12th; 13th; 14th; 15th; 16th
- Decades: 1330s; 1340s; 1350s; 1360s; 1370s
- See also: Other events of 1352; List of years in Ireland

This is a list of events from the year 1352 in Ireland.

== Incumbent ==
- Lord: Edward III

== Events ==
- Marriage of Elizabeth de Burgh, 4th Countess of Ulster, daughter and heiress of William Donn de Burgh, 3rd Earl of Ulster to Lionel of Antwerp, 1st Duke of Clarence

== Deaths ==
- Hugh de Burgh, Lord Treasurer of Ireland
