= 1359 in Ireland =

- Centuries: 12th; 13th; 14th; 15th; 16th
- Decades: 1330s; 1340s; 1350s; 1360s; 1370s
- See also: Other events of 1359; List of years in Ireland

Events from the year 1359 in Ireland.

== Incumbent ==
- Lord: Edward III

== Events ==
- Thomas de Burley, Prior of the Order of St. John of Jerusalem appointed Lord Chancellor of Ireland

== Births ==
- James Butler, 3rd Earl of Ormond, died 1405
