= Uilliam Ó Dubhda =

Irish bishop

Uilliam Ó Dubhda, also known as William Ó Dúda and similar variants, was Bishop of Killala from 1346 to 1350. According to the Annals of Clonmacnoise, he apparently died of the Black Death in 1350 with several companions, "within six days because of the pestilence [in Mayo]."

Catholic Church titles
Preceded by James Bermingham	Bishop of Killala; 1346–1350	Succeeded by Robert Elyot
