= 1354 in Ireland =

- Centuries: 12th; 13th; 14th; 15th; 16th
- Decades: 1330s; 1340s; 1350s; 1360s; 1370s
- See also: Other events of 1354; List of years in Ireland

Events from the year 1354 in Ireland.

== Incumbent ==
- Lord: Edward III

== Deaths ==
- Edmund de Grimsby, an English cleric, Crown official and judge. While his career in Ireland lasted only about a year, he is notable as having been the first Master of the Rolls in Ireland.
