= 1348 in Ireland =

- Centuries: 12th; 13th; 14th; 15th; 16th
- Decades: 1320s; 1330s; 1340s; 1350s; 1360s
- See also: Other events of 1348; List of years in Ireland

Events from the year 1348 in Ireland.

== Incumbent ==
- Lord: Edward III

== Events ==
- 17 March – "Hugo de Calce, papal clerk, collector and gatherer of the tax in Dublin, was killed."
- 28 March – Domhnall Ó Ceinnéidigh is captured and imprisoned by the Purcells.
- 2 June – Domhnall Ó Ceinnéidigh and the son of Brian Ó Briain are "judged, hanged and drawn at the tails of horses" at Thurles.
- 3 June – Domhnall Mac Murchada and Muircheartach Cáemánach are murdered by members of their clan.
- July and August – Fulk de la Freigne, custodian of the lands of the James Butler, 2nd Earl of Ormonde, restores Nenagh to its citizens, compels the Irish to repair property they destroyed, and "with a large fine and a heavy ransom of cattle and the deliverance of hostages, he forces the Irish to return to their original state and due submission (that everyone had thought impossible)."
- August – the Black Death reaches the ports of Drogheda and Dalkey.
- August to Christmas – "These cities of Dublin and Drogheda were almost destroyed and wasted of inhabitants and men so that in Dublin alone, from the beginning of August right up to Christmas, fourteen thousand men [or people] died."
- September and October – people from all walks of life, and from all over Ireland, make a pilgrimage to St.Moling's Well. "Some came from feelings of devotion, others (the majority) from fear of the plague that then prevailed beyond measure."
- Niall Ó Domhnaill is killed by Maghnus Ó Domhnaill at the port of Inis-Saimer. Aengus mac Conchobhair Ó Domhnaill "who had been in contention with Niall," became King of Tír Connaill.
- Warfare occurs in Connacht between Fergal MacDermott and Ruaidhri mac Cathal mac Andrew. MacDermott's fortress is destroyed, as is Ruaidhri's at Ballymote, "both stone structure and wooden house, and they took what was there of hostages with them, including the son of Ua Ruairc, and they went themselves safe to their houses."
- The Clan MacFeorais, alias de Berminghams of Dunmore, are banished by Edmond Burke, leading the head of the family to seek aid from Aedh mac Tairdelbach Ó Conchobhair, King of Connacht.

== Deaths ==
- 12 May – David de Barry, son of Lord de Barry.
- 12 August – Gilla-na-naem Ua Cianain, abbot of Lis-gabhail.
- Cathal Ua Fergail, chief of Annaly.
- Mailshechlainn Mag Oirechtaigh, chief of Muinter-Radhuibh.
- Donnchadh Mag Bradaigh, chief of Cuil-Brighdin.
