= 1351 in Ireland =

- Centuries: 12th; 13th; 14th; 15th; 16th
- Decades: 1330s; 1340s; 1350s; 1360s; 1370s
- See also: Other events of 1351; List of years in Ireland

Events from the year 1351 in Ireland.

== Incumbent ==
- Lord: Edward III
- Chief Baron: Robert de Emeldon

== Events ==
- Aodh, son of Toirdhealbhach Ó Conchobhair, recovers kingship of Connacht; expels Aodh mac Feidhlimidh Ó Conchobhair.
- Robert de Emeldon, former Lord High Treasurer disgraced due to corruption, is appointed as Chief Baron of the Irish Exchequer
- 17 October – Great council occurs in Dublin.
- 31 October – Great council occurs in Kilkenny; ordinances to curtail Gaelisization of Anglo-Irish, and the statute of labourers applied to Ireland.
- Christmas – 'Nodlaig na Garma'; convention of poets and men of learning is held by Uilliam Buide Ó Ceallaigh; commemorated in Gofraidh Fionn Ó Dálaigh's poem, Filidh Éireann go haointeach.
