= Robert Elyot (bishop) =

Irish bishop

- Bishop of Killala
- Church: Roman Catholic Church
- Diocese: Killala
- Appointed: 8 June 1351
- In office: 1351–1383 (deprived by Antipope Clement VII)
- Previous post: Bishop of Waterford (1349–1350)

Personal details
- Died: before January 1390

Robert Elyot was Bishop of Waterford from 1349 to 1350; and then of Killala from 1351 to 1383. He was appointed 8 June 1351 but deprived by Antipope Clement VII before 17 January 1383; he died before January 1390.

Catholic Church titles
Preceded by Richard Francis	Bishop of Waterford; 1351–1383	Succeeded by Roger Cradock
Preceded by Uilliam Ó Dubhda	Bishop of Killala; 1351–1383	Succeeded by Brian mac Donchadha Ó Dubha
