= 1353 in Ireland =

- Centuries: 12th; 13th; 14th; 15th; 16th
- Decades: 1330s; 1340s; 1350s; 1360s; 1370s
- See also: Other events of 1353; List of years in Ireland

Events from the year 1353 in Ireland.

== Incumbent ==
- Lord: Edward III

== Events ==
- In resolution of the dispute between the Archbishop of Armagh (at this time, Richard FitzRalph) and the Archbishop of Dublin (at this time, John de St Paul) over the Primacy of Ireland, Pope Innocent VI of the Avignon Papacy, acting on the advice of the College of Cardinals, rules that "each of these prelates should be Primate; while, for the distinction of style, the Primate of Armagh should entitle himself Primate of All Ireland, but the Metropolitan of Dublin should subscribe himself Primate of Ireland."
- Freemen of Youghal are allowed freedom in trade in different staples throughout England and Wales for wool, leather, woolfels and lead.

== Deaths ==
- Ulick de Burgh or Burke 1st Clanricarde
