= 1355 in Ireland =

- Centuries: 12th; 13th; 14th; 15th; 16th
- Decades: 1330s; 1340s; 1350s; 1360s; 1370s
- See also: Other events of 1355; List of years in Ireland

Events from the year 1355 in Ireland.

== Incumbent ==
- Lord: Edward III
