= 1361 in Ireland =

- Centuries: 12th; 13th; 14th; 15th; 16th
- Decades: 1340s; 1350s; 1360s; 1370s; 1380s
- See also: Other events of 1361; List of years in Ireland

Events from the year 1361 in Ireland.

== Incumbent ==
- Lord: Edward III

== Events ==
- Arrival of English expedition under Prince Lionel of Clarence, Earl of Ulster, to stem the decline of the colony.

== Deaths ==
- Henry de Motlowe, an English-born judge who briefly held office as Lord Chief Justice of Ireland.
