= 1347 in Ireland =

- Centuries: 12th; 13th; 14th; 15th; 16th
- Decades: 1320s; 1330s; 1340s; 1350s; 1360s
- See also: Other events of 1347; List of years in Ireland

Events from the year 1347 in Ireland.

== Incumbent ==
- Lord: Edward III

== Events ==
- 25 March – Lord Nicholas de Verdun is buried at Drogheda "with great splendour and solemn rites and with many in the procession to the convent."
- "On the same day at Kilkenny, Lady Isabella Palmer, who had built the front of the friars choir, was committed to the earth; she had reached a praiseworthy old age and, having lived about 70 years religiously and honourably in her widowhood and in virginity, as it was said and believed, she passed from this life."
- 11 November – "The earldom of Ormond and its regalities was granted to James Butler, the younger, by the King."
- 2 December – "The confraternity of the Friars Minor of Kilkenny is established for the purpose of erecting a new bell tower and for repairing the church."
- 25 December – "At Christmas, Domhnall Ó Ceinnéidigh, son of Phillip, conspired with the Irish of Munster, Connacht, Meath and Leinster, and they burnt and destroyed the town of Nenagh and the whole neighbourhood and all the Ormond castles except the castle of Nenagh." (see also 28 March 1348 and 2 June 1348).

== Ongoing Events ==
- "Maurice Fitz Thomas, Earl of Kildare, and Lord Fulk de la Freigne, having been called and invited by the King entered France for the Siege of Calais that lasted from the preceding feast of the nativity of blessed Mary right up to the feast of St. Laurence, martyr. And then after many attacks and dreadful and incredible famine the French were compelled to submit they keys of the city and themselves to the mercy of the King of England."

== Events of Unknown date ==
- Ballymote Castle was taken by the Mac Diarmada, from the O'Connors of Sligo during the course of local struggles in 1347.
- "The Friars Preachers of Ireland obtained an exemption and permission to eat flesh outside (the priory) from the lord Pope Clement VI, that from the beginning of their religious (life) they did not have before."
- "Friar Richard, Bishop of Ossory, obtained exemption from the jurisdiction and supremacy of the archbishop of Dublin at the Roman Curia."
- "Ferghal son of Ualgharc Ua Ruairc, was killed by the son of Cathal Mac Donnchaidh the Cleric."
- "Brian Mac Diarmata, one fit to be king of Magh-Luirg, was killed in the town of Ros-Comain, whilst he was with the bishop Ua Finachta, with one shot of an arrow. And the person to whom the discharge of the shot was brought home was mangled and killed therefor, namely, Ruaidhri Ua Donnchadha of the Chamber."
- "Brian Ua Briain was killed in treachery by the sons of Mac Ceothach"
- "Aedh, son of Aedh Ua Concobuir the Brefnian, king of Connacht, was killed by Aedh Ua Ruairc on Magh-Enghaide."
- "The church of Kilronan was re-erected by Farrell O'Duigenan."
- "Maurice Mac Dermot was slain by John Roe Mac David Burke."
- "Teige Mac Rannall, Chief of Muintir-Eolais, was taken prisoner by the Clann-Murtough O'Conor."
- "William Mac David Burke was slain at Ballintober by Teige Roe Mac Dermot Gall."
- "Thomas Mac Artan, Lord of Iveagh, in Ulidia, was hanged by the English."

== Births ==
- Murchadh Ó Madadhain, Chief of Síol Anmchadha, fl.

== Deaths ==
- 10 July – Roger de la Freigne, Seneschal of Kilkenny.
- 7 December – Oliver de la Freigne, Seneschal of Kilkenny.

== Deaths of unknown date ==
- Maelmaedhog Ó Taichligh, Official of Lough Erne
- Eoghan mac Murchadh Ó Mhadáin, Chief of Síol Anmchadha
- Aengus, the son of Gara Ó Ó Mhadáin
- Gilla na Naemh mac Geoffrey mac Gilla na Naemh Ó Fearghail, Lord of Annaly, at Cluainliosbeg
- Siry Ó Curnin, a learned poet and Ollamh of Bréifne
- Aenghus Ó hEoghusa, a general, expert proficient in the arts of poetry
- Aengus Ruadh mac Donnchadh mac Aengus mac Donnchadh Mor Ó Dalaigh, Sage
- Finola, daughter of Mac Fineen, and wife of Fearghail Ó Duibhgeannáin
- Henry, son of Hugh Boy O'Neill
- Finola, daughter of Melaghlin Ó Raghallaigh
- Gilladubh Mac Gillamochua
- Donough mac Aedh Oge Ó Fearghail
