= 1345 in Ireland =

- Centuries: 12th; 13th; 14th; 15th; 16th
- Decades: 1320s; 1330s; 1340s; 1350s; 1360s
- See also: Other events of 1345; List of years in Ireland

Events from the year 1345 in Ireland.

== Incumbent ==
- Lord: Edward III

== Events ==
- 22 February – an assembly is held in Callan, County Kilkenny, under the presidency of Maurice FitzGerald, 2nd Earl of Desmond.
- March – Énrí Ó Néill of Clann Aodha Buidhe (Clandeboye, King of Tír Eógain, is deposed by Justiciar Sir Raoul d'Ufford and replaced by Aodh Reamhar mac Domhnall Ó Néill, aka Aodh Mór.
- 24 April – Parliament is held in Dublin
- 5 June – the second Parliament is held in Dublin.
- 26 June – Earl of Desmond attacks Nenagh.
- Justiciar d'Ufford campaigns against Desmond.
- 30 September – Justicier captures Askeaton.
- 15 October – Clann Mhuirchertaigh kills King Toirdhealbach of Connacht; who is succeeded by his son Aodh O Conchobhair.
- 21 October – Justiciar captures Castleisland.
- Autumn(?) Maurice FitzGerald, 4th Earl of Kildare is arrested and imprisoned in Dublin Castle.
- December – at Naas, the Justiciar resumes liberty of Kildare to the crown.
