= 1357 in Ireland =

- Centuries: 12th; 13th; 14th; 15th; 16th
- Decades: 1330s; 1340s; 1350s; 1360s; 1370s
- See also: Other events of 1357; List of years in Ireland

Events from the year 1357 in Ireland.

== Incumbent ==
- Lord: Edward III

== Events ==
- John Frowyk, Prior of the Order of St. John of Jerusalem appointed Lord Chancellor of Ireland
- Geoffrey the Baker reported that in late 1357 the Black Death took the Gaelic-Irish "unawares and annihilated them everywhere"

== Births ==
- Art Mór Mac Murchadha Caomhánach, King of Leinster
