= Roger Cradock =

Roger Cradock, O.F.M was a bishop in the second half of the 14th Century.

Craddock was appointed Bishop of Waterford on 2 March 1350. He received possession of the temporalities on 17 August 1350 and again 10 May 1352. Cradock was translated to Llandaff in December 1361; and died on 22 June 1382.

Catholic Church titles
Preceded by Robert Elyot	Bishop of Waterford; 1351–1361	Succeeded by Thomas le Reve as Bishop of Waterford; AND Lismore
Preceded by John Paschal	Bishop of Llandaff; 1361–1382	Succeeded by Thomas Rushhook
