= John Clyn =

Irish Franciscan Irish chronicler

John Clyn, O.F.M. (c. 1286 – c. 1349), of the Friars Minor, Kilkenny, was a 14th-century Irish friar and chronicler who lived at the time of the Black Death.

== Background ==
Clyn was probably born in Leinster some years prior to 1300, possibly at Baile a Clinn/Clyn's town/Clintstown, in the parish of Conahy, some six and a half miles north-west of Kilkenny. The surname Clyn is found in Somerset and Bristol, which may have been where his Anglo-Norman ancestors originated.

== Career ==
Bishop James Ussher stated, possibly in error, that Clyn was a doctor of the Franciscan Order. This statement may be a presumption as it has no supporting evidence. Clyn was well educated, though just where he received his education is unknown. He may have attended the university at Dublin, while Oxford and Cambridge remain more distant possibilities.

Clyn is recorded as the Guardian of the friary of Carrick in 1336; Bernadette Williams believes that he would have been about fifty at that time ("around the same age as his hero Fulk de la Freigne"), as someone mature would have been needed to hold that post.

Clyn may have attended the General Chapter of the Friars Minor at Marseille in 1346. At some point between 1336 and 1348 he moved to Kilkenny.

John Clyn wrote a diary, or journal, about the Black Death, which has become a key primary source on the plague. He left blank pages for those who wanted to "finish the work."

He was still alive after 17 June 1349, his last entry in his annals being a eulogy for Fulk de la Freigne. It is unknown whether Clyn perished from the disease. Though the Black Death persisted in Ireland until 1350, Clyn may have survived it. If this is the case, he may have ceased writing "... because of the death of his friend, and perhaps patron, Fulk de la Freigne."

== The Annals of Ireland ==
In an effort to identify Clyn's purpose in writing his annals, Bernadette Williams states:

They are not a house chronicle, a town chronicle or a political history. ... the difference between a city and county annalist is quite evident; Clyn was not a member of the burgage population of Kilkenny but a man of the countryside. ... The reality is that Clyn was writing a military history of the geographical area of Kilkenny and Tipperary ... his audience was either the military men of that area or more specifically a military family such as the de la Freignes.

Indeed, the latter family are mentioned fulsomely in his annals.

As a person "from a military and chivalric background ... he displayed an acceptance of the military situation on the ground" but abhorred "treachery and unprovoked violence."

Clyn would be unknown as the author had he not identified himself in his entry on the Black Death.

In 2007 an edition of the annals of Friar Clyn was translated into English by Dr. Bernadette Williams.

== Notable entry ==
So that notable deeds should not perish with time, and be lost from the memory of future generations, I, seeing these many ills, and that the whole world encompassed by evil, waiting among the dead for death to come, have committed to writing what I have truly heard and examined; and so that the writing does not perish with the writer, or the work fail with the workman, I leave parchment for continuing the work, in case anyone should still be alive in the future and any son of Adam can escape this pestilence and continue the work thus begun.

== See also ==
- 1349 in Ireland
- Mícheál Ó Cléirigh
- John Colgan
- Patrick Fleming (Franciscan)
- Michael Shiell
- Irish annals
- Annals of Ulster
- The Chronicle of Ireland
- Chronicon Scotorum
