= West Breifne =

Historic kingdom of Ireland

Kingdom of West Breifne Bréifne Ua Ruairc (in Irish)
- 1256–1605
- Coat of arms
- Motto: Buagh (English: Victory)
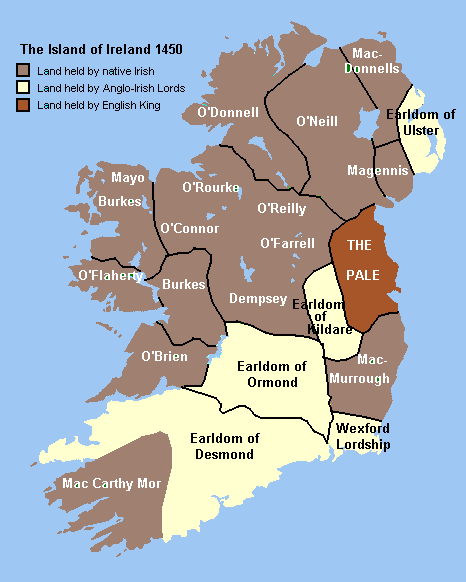
- A map of 1450 Ireland showing Breifne O'Rourke
- Capital: Dromahair
- Common languages: Irish
- Religion: Roman Catholic
- Government: Elective monarchy
- King (Lord)
  - 1250–1257: Conchobar Ó Ruairc
  - 1603–1605: Tadhg O'Rourke
- History
  - Dissolution of Breifne: 1256
  - Shired: 1583
  - Dissolved: 1605
Preceded by	Succeeded by
Breifne	Kingdom of Ireland
- Today part of: Ireland

The Kingdom of West Breifne (Irish: Breifne Ua Ruairc) or Breifne O'Rourke was a historic kingdom of Ireland that existed from 1256 to 1605, located in the area that is now County Leitrim. It took its present boundaries in 1583 when West Breifne was shired and renamed Leitrim, after the village of Leitrim, which was an O'Rourke stronghold. The kingdom came into existence after a battle between the ruling O'Rourke clan and the ascendant O'Reillys caused the breakup of the older Kingdom of Breifne and led to the formation of East Breifne and West Breifne. The kingdom was ruled by the O'Rourke clan and lasted until the early 17th century, when their lands were confiscated by England.

== Medieval History ==
=== Formation ===
In 1172, Tighearnán Ua Ruairc, the longtime King of Breifne and Conmaice, was betrayed and killed during negotiations with the Anglo Normans Hugh de Lacy the Lord of Meath,appointed by King Henry II of England. Tighearnán Ua Ruairc was assassinated, and his head and body were conveyed to Dublin where it was put on public display. The assassination of the King of Breifne caused a war of succession in Breifne and for the next hundred years there would be no long-standing King of Breifne, as rival vassels of the O'Rourke and O'Reilly clans fought for the kingship. This time of turbulence in the kingdom caused a great rift between the various branches of clan O'Rourke, with regular fighting between rival clan members. The resulting instability and weakness of Breifne, which had already lost some of its territory during the Anglo Norman invasion of Meath and north Leinster, prompted the O'Reilly vassels in the east of the Breifne kingdom to launch a campaign against the ruling O'Rourke dynasty. By the late 1230s the O'Reilly had usurped control of Breifne, Cathal O'Reilly ruled as king from the east of the kingdom and Cúchonnacht O'Reilly, Connacht's foremost general and close ally of King Felim O'Conor, had militarily taken control of western Breifne and expelled the O'Rourke leaders.

The turbulent decades that followed saw the O'Reilly lordship of eastern Breifne switch allegiance to the Norman de Burghs, while the O'Rourke lordship were once again allied to the O'Conors of Connacht. By 1250 the O'Reilly clans had been pushed back out of western Breifne as Connacht advanced into their eastern homeland. In 1256 a devastating Breifne kingdom war broke out known as the Battle of Magh Slecht fought primarily in the barony of Tullyhaw, between the O'Rourke clans and the O'Reilly clans supported by the large army of Anglo-Normaan Walter de Burgh. The battle ended in an tactical victory for Conchobhair O'Rourke, but they had lost complete control over the eastern half of their kingdom. The immediate chaos that ensued within Breifne following the war left the O'Rourkes without the power to retake it. As a result, Breifne became permanently divided into East Breifne (O'Reilly) and West Breifne (O'Rourke).

=== Conflict with Connacht ===
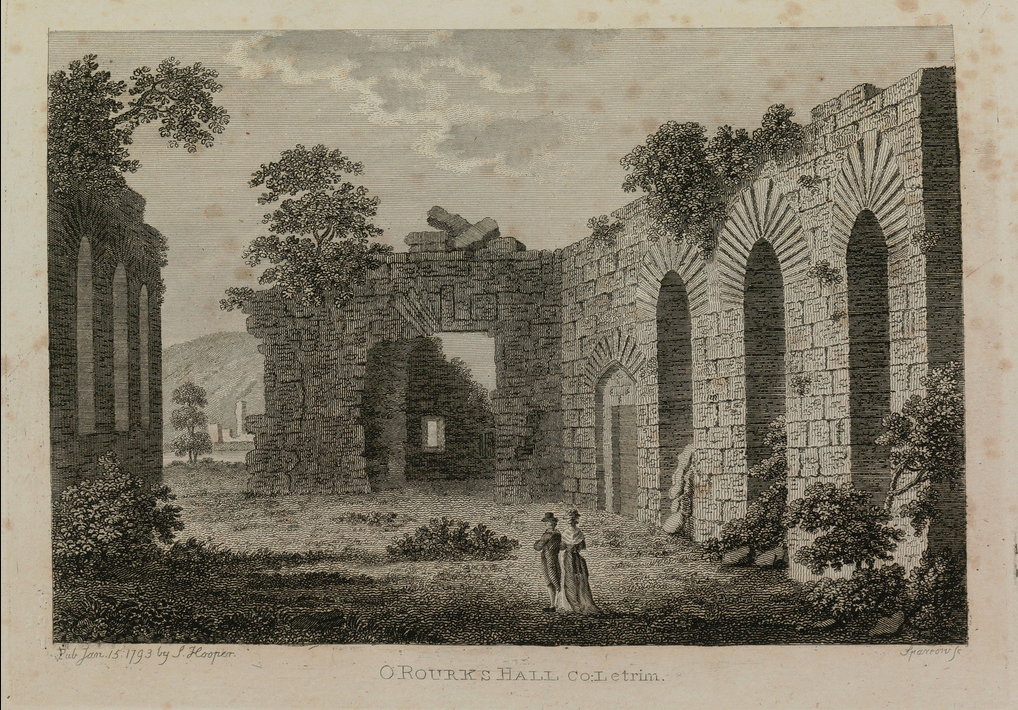
18th century illustration of the ruins of the O'Rourke banqueting hall in their capital of Dromahair

After successfully repelling de Burgh and the O'Reilly, the kings of Connacht, Tír Eoghain and Tír Chonaill met at Caoluisce Castle to agree to form a united front against the Normans in the future. At these talks, which the O'Rourke lords of Breifne were excluded from, it was agreed that the king of Connacht was the rightful ruler of all of Breifne "from Kells to Drumcliff". Consequently, Aedh O'Conor saw Breifne as an integral part of Connacht rather than an independent kingdom and, as heir to the kingship, was determined to rein in its leaders. This put Aedh in direct confrontation with Conchobar O'Ruairc, king of West Breifne, who rebelled against him. According to the Annals of Connacht, the two men "had been good comrades till now".

To assert West Breifne's independence, Conchobar made peace with the de Burghs without the permission of the king of Connacht, prompting Aedh O'Conor to launch raids on West Breifne. In 1257, after a brief war, Conchobar submitted to O'Conor and signed a peace treaty offering O'Conor any lands of his choice in Breifne. O'Conor obtained the stone castle on Cherry Island in Garadice Lough and put a garrison into it. Later that year, Conchobar violated the terms of the treaty and forced O'Conor's garrison out of the castle before razing it. Due to this act of betrayal, Aedh O'Conor elected Sitric O'Ruairc to replace Conchobar as king of West Breifne, however, Sitric was soon killed by Domnall, Conchobar's son, to avenge his father's dispossession. This led to Domnall's arrest and imprisonment and Aedh O'Conor resumed raids on West Breifne.

This sparked a series of conflicts that lasted from 1257 to 1266 whereby Aedh O’Conor attempted to control the politics of West Breifne by instating and supporting his favoured candidates as kings, driving a wedge between the O’Rourkes, with devastating consequences for the unity and stability of the kingdom. Amlaib was chosen to succeed Sitric, however the kingdom was in disarray and, like his predecessor, his authority as king was nominal. His rule marks the first appearance in the annals of the king ruling "from the mountain westward" i.e. west of Slieve Anieran on the eastern shore of Lough Allen – a situation that was to be repeated in the 15th century. Art O’Ruairc, son of Cathal Riabach (King of Breifne, 1231–1236), ruled the east in opposition to Amlaib and Connacht.

In 1258, with the war against Connacht still ongoing, Conchobar was betrayed and murdered by his own men with the assistance of Matha O'Reilly, king of East Breifne, who had also risen up in rebellion against Aedh O'Conor. After his father's death, Domnall was released from prison and instated as king of West Breifne. However, shortly after his appointment as king, Domnall killed Magrath Mac Tiernan, chieftain of Tellach-Dunchada, which was a clan that held land within Breifne. As a result of this killing, Domnall was deposed as king by the major clans of West Breifne, including Tellach-Dunchada, who executed Domnall's brother Cathal in retaliation.

After Domnall was deposed, Art O'Ruairc was supported by the major clans as the effective ruler of the entire kingdom, but in 1259, he was taken prisoner by Connacht. Connacht continued to vie for control of Breifne and supported Art bec, Amlaib's brother, as king in 1260. Evidently, a rift emerged between the two as Aedh O'Conor killed Art bec, his own candidate for the kingship, that same year and met with Domnall. After peace between the two kingdoms was agreed, kingship was returned to Domnall. However, this peace was to be short-lived, in 1260 the Tellach-Dunchada killed Domnall and in 1261 Art O'Ruairc escaped from imprisonment and was made king by the chieftains of Breifne upon his return. An attempt by Connacht to depose Art O'Ruairc and regain control of Breifne in 1261 failed when their army was defeated at Drumlahan by the O'Reilly and forced to retreat.

The conflict between Connacht and West Breifne ended in 1266, when Aedh O'Conor, now King of Connacht, launched a successful invasion of the kingdom and deposed Art O'Ruairc, instating Conchobar buide, son of King Amlaíb (1257–1258), as the new king. Aedh O'Conor also took hostages from all the major clans of the kingdom. The O'Rourke rebellion against Connacht's dominance was ultimately a failure, but the O'Reilly of East Breifne had succeeded in theirs and Connacht never regained control of the east.

Conchobar buide reigned with the support of the king of Connacht until his death in 1273. He was succeeded by Tigernan, grandson of Ualgarg Ó Ruairc (King of Breifne, 1210–1231), who died just one year after his inauguration. Following Tigernan's death, Art O'Ruairc would again become king in 1275 and reigned only for a short time before being killed in battle against the Normans near Granard and was succeeded by his son, Amlaib who reigned until 1307, when he was killed in battle against the MacSamhradhain of Tullyhaw.

=== Dynastic fracture ===
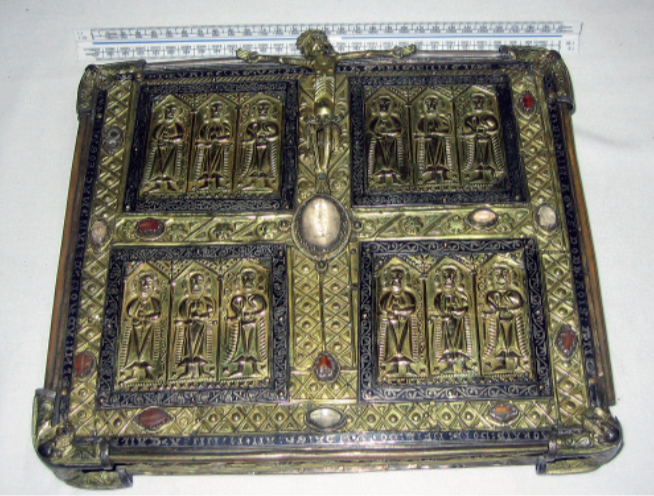
Shrine of St. Caillín, a cumdach produced in 1516

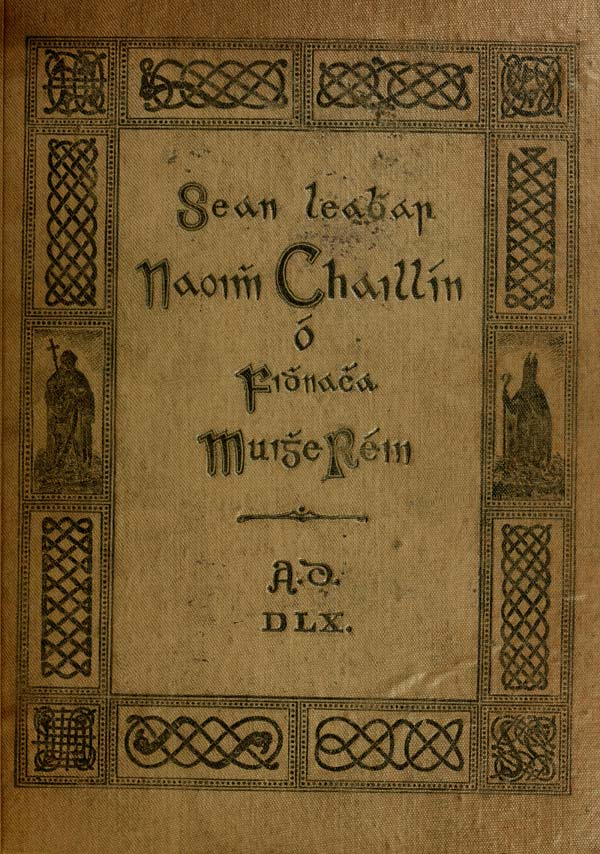
The Book of Fenagh was inscribed at Fenagh Abbey and documents the politics of the region. It also includes a reproduction of the book of St. Caillin written in 560. The original is held by the Royal Irish Academy

Domnall Carrach, Conchobar buide's brother, was inaugurated in 1307 and although he only ruled for four years until his death in 1311, his reign, but particularly that of his son Ualgarg Mór, marked the beginning of dynasty that would last for the rest of the kingdom's history. Ualgarg Mór reigned for thirty years from 1316 to 1346 and restored power and prestige to West Breifne and the Ó Ruairc dynasty, which had been in decline for over a century and was under attack from almost all sides. He was inaugurated in 1316 with the support of King Fedlim of Connacht and fought alongside Fedlim in the Second Battle of Athenry that year. Following Fedlim's death at Athenry, Connacht descended into chaos as numerous contenders for its kingship emerged. In 1318 Ualgarg Mór forged an alliance with Maelruanaid Mac Diarmata, King of Moylurg, to support Fedlim's son Toirdelbach as king of Connacht. This was in competition to Domnall O'Conor of Clan Muircheartaigh Uí Conchobhair, who were at war with the Ó Ruaircs and were occupying large parts of West Breifne.

Clan Muircheartaigh arrived in West Breifne in the 1280s and by the time of Ualgarg Mór had assimilated into the kingdom. Their chief Aedh Breifnach, as his name would suggest, was born and raised in Breifne and they had found staunch allies in Clan Mac Tiernan of Teallach Dunchadha. They operated from their power base in West Breifne with the ultimate goal of re-establishing themselves as kings of Connacht, but for decades attempted to exercise control over all of Breifne (East and West) and were met with fierce resistance. After decades of conflict, Ualgarg Mór drove Clan Muircheartaigh out of Breifne in 1343. While in Calry, County Sligo in 1346, a battle unexpectedly erupted during which Ualgarg Mór was killed by Maelruanaid Mac Donnchada. His dominance over the kingdom and his many children helped establish his line as the rulers of West Breifne for the rest of its history. He was succeeded by his brother Flaithbheartach who ruled for 3 years before being overthrown by Ualgarg Mór's son Aodh bán. Aodh bán killed Aedh mac Aedh Breifneach, chief of Clan Muircheartaigh and briefly the king of Connacht, in battle in 1350.

Cathal, Aedh mac Aedh Breifneach 's brother, killed Aodh bán in 1352 and re-instated Flaithbheartach as king, Clan Muircheartaigh's influence in West Breifne had returned. However, Flaithbheartach died a few months into his reign and another of Ualgarg Mór's sons, Tadhg na gCaor, was made king. Under Tadhg na gCaor's leadership, Clan Muircheartaigh were finally driven out of Breifne in 1370 with the help of the O'Reilly, O'Farrell, Mac Raghnaill and Maguires. They sought refuge in MacWilliam Burke and never returned to West Breifne. Tadhg na gCaor and his followers settled in Cenel Luacháin, an area in the modern barony of Carrigallen that included some parishes in western County Cavan. He ruled from there until his death in 1376 and his younger brother Tigernán Mór succeeded him. Tadhg na gCaor's descendants became the O'Rourke's of Carrigallen.

Tigernán Mór reigned for 42 years from his power base at Dromahair. The later years of his reign were marked by a deepening rift between the various branches of the O'Rourke sept. He died of natural causes at an old age in his stronghold at Dromahair on St. Brigid's Day. Art, son of Tadhg na gCaor, and the head of the Carrigallen O'Rourkes raised an army to vie for kingship but it was eventually passed to Tigernán Mór's son Aodh buidhe. Aodh buidhe ruled from his father's castle for a year and half until his unexpected death in 1419 following an anomalously hot Autumn. His brother Tadhg was chosen to succeed him, but Art proclaimed himself king and was elected by his supporters. The stage had been set for the wars of succession which were to characterise the politics of West Breifne for the next century.

=== Wars of succession ===
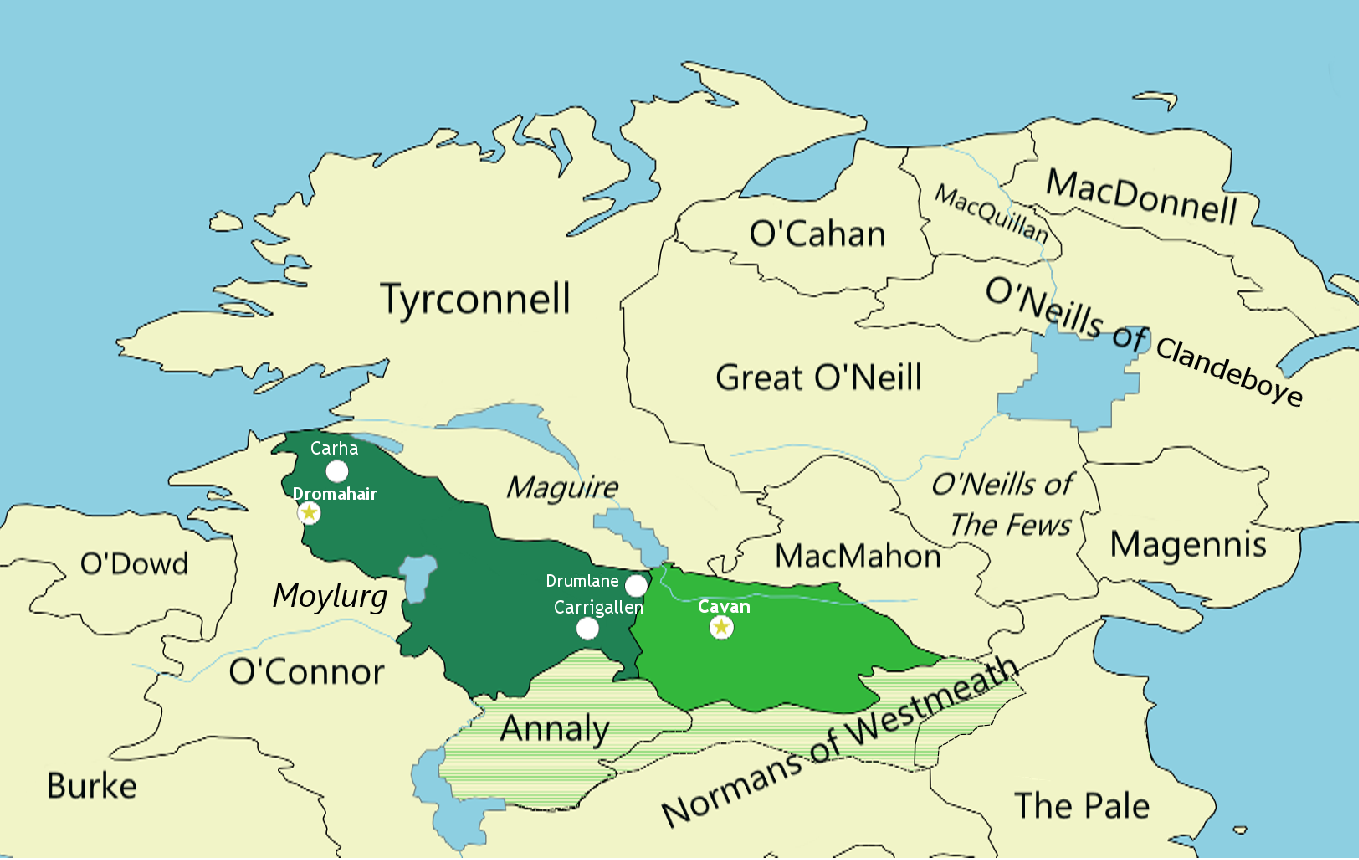
Breifne Region ca. 1500. Dark green – West Breifne Light green – East Breifne Horizontal green lines – Former Kingdom of Breifne's greatest extent ca. 1170

For much of its history, West Breifne saw disputes over kingship, with persistent battles between rival factions. As a result of factions consolidating power in their home regions, three distinct branches of royalty emerged in the 14th and 15th centuries, named after the areas in which they were based. All three branches trace their lineage back to King Ualgarg mór (1316–1346). The O'Rourkes of Dromahair were the main line of kings. The term "O'Rourkes of Dromahair" only came into use after King Tigernán óg (1449–1468), and refers to those based in the capital Dromahair in the west of the kingdom. The O'Rourkes of Carrigallen were descendants from Tadhg na gCaor, Ualgarg mór's son, who reigned from 1352 to 1376. Due to their strategic location east of Lough Allen and the Iron Mountains, they twice divided the kingdom along east–west lines. The third branch, the O'Rourkes of Carha, based in the northwest, emerged in the mid-15th century with the crowning of King Donnchadh, great-grandson of Ualgarg mór. The kingship of West Breifne during this volatile period largely depended upon the often capricious support of the other clans within the kingdom and the surrounding area, notably the MacSamhradhain, Mac Raghnaill and Tellach-Dunchada.

==== First 1419–1424 ====
The most significant of the rivalries was between the O'Rourkes of Dromahair, those based in the capital, and the O'Rourkes of Carrigallen. This rivalry would see the kingdom split between "East Breifne O'Rourke" (North Leitrim) and "West Breifne O'Rourke" (South Leitrim) at least twice. The first was from 1419 to 1424, following the death of King Aedh Buidhe. Aedh's brother, Tadhg, was chosen to succeed his brother as King, however in southern Leitrim, Art O'Rourke, son of King Tadhg na gCaor (1352–1376), was elected king with the support of the Tellach Dunchada, the Mac Raghnaill. At his inauguration, Tadhg had declared himself "king of all Breifne" and as a result, Eoghan O'Reilly, king of East Breifne, threw his support behind Art O'Rourke and moved soldiers into Carrigallen. Beset with problems back home just months later, the O'Reilly withdrew support for Art and his rebellion collapsed. West Breifne was more or less completely under the control of Tadhg by the end of 1420 and Art was in exile, however it would take until 1424 for Art to finally submit to Tadhg.

==== Second 1435–1458 ====
The second split occurred after King Tadhg's death in 1435. King Tadhg was to be succeeded by his brother Donnchadh Bacagh. However, Art O'Rourke's brother, Lochlainn Ó Ruairc, was declared "King of East Breifne O'Rourke" and the kingdom was again divided. Donnchadh Bacagh died in 1445 and his nephew Donnchadh, the first of the Carha line, was elected to take his place and ruled until his death in 1449. He was succeeded by his cousin Tigernan óg. The two kingdoms were at war until 1458 when East Breifne O'Rourke was invaded by the Maguires of Fermanagh, Lochlainn Ó Ruairc, now 80 years old, was defeated and the kingship of East Breifne O'Rourke was dissolved. Tigernán óg became king of a united West Breifne.

==== Third 1468–1476 ====
Following the death of King Tigernán óg in 1468, kingship was again in dispute, this time between Domnall, Tigernán óg's brother, and Donnchadh losc, Tigernán óg's uncle. Domnall was supported by the O'Rourkes of Dromahair and Ruadh O'Donnell, the Lord of Tír Chonaill. Donnchadh losc received support from the O'Rourkes of Carha as well as the people of Carbury and the Clann-Donough. In 1470, Domnall and O'Donnell led an army to "Cruachan", the traditional inauguration site of kings, in an attempt to inaugurate Domnall, however, they were stopped at Ballyconnell by the O'Reilly. This dispute caused infighting within West Breifne and left a deepened rivalry between the O'Rourkes of Dromahair and the O'Rourkes of Carha. The dispute ended in a victory for the O'Rourkes of Carha and their allies, who elected King Feidhlimidh mac Donnchadha in 1476. He ruled from his stronghold of Castle Carha for 24 contentious years.

==== Fourth 1528–1536 ====
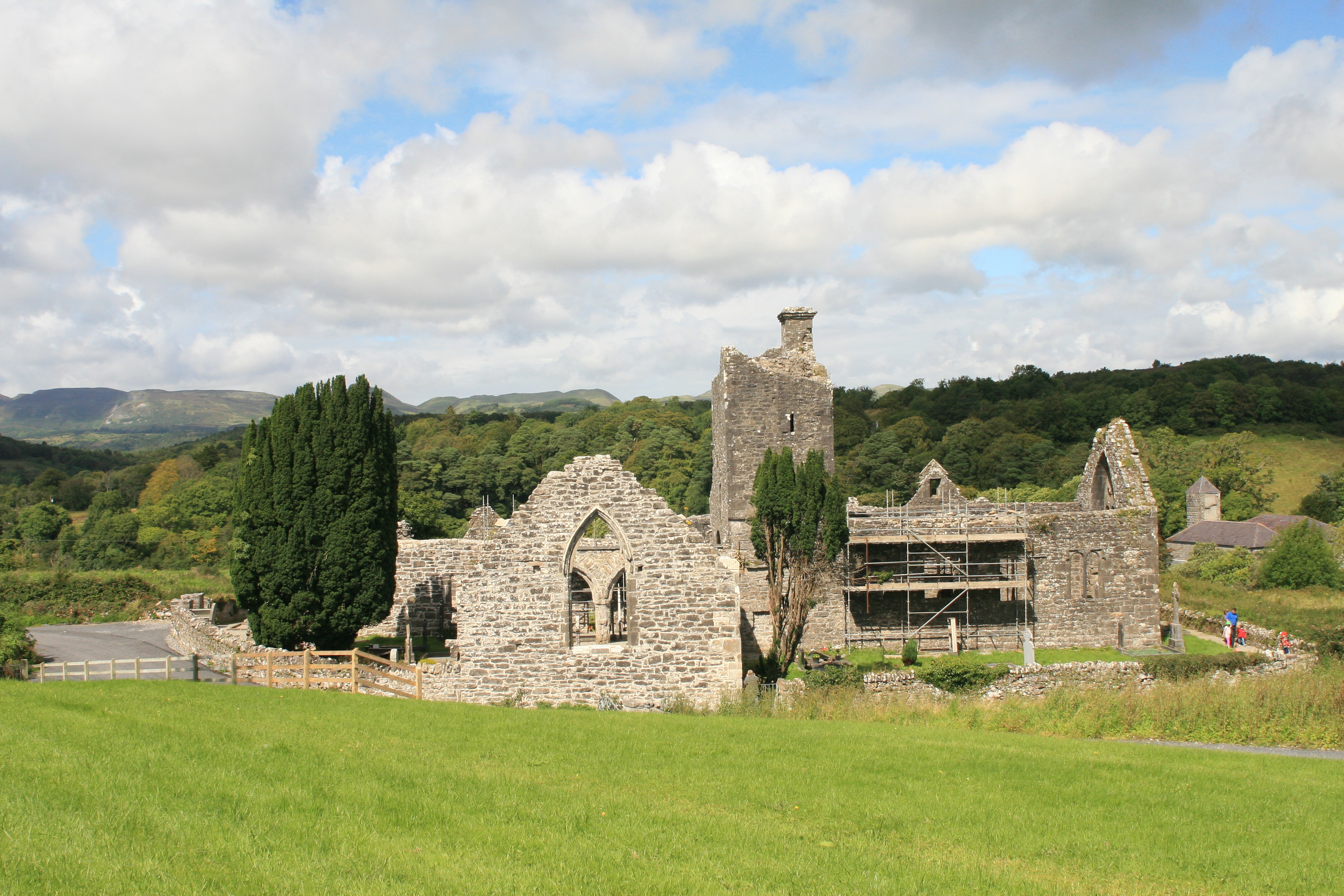
Creevelea Friary was founded by King Eóghan and Queen Margaret O'Rourke in 1508

In 1488, Eóghan, son of Tigernán óg (1449–1468), killed King Feidhlimidh mac Donnchadha's son, also called Eoghan. Following the death of Feidhlimidh mac Donnchadha in 1500, Eóghan became king. After Eóghan's death in 1528, Feidhlimidh, another son of King Feidhlimidh mac Donnchadha, claimed the throne and ruled from Castle Carha, in contention with Brian Ballach, son of Eóghan. In 1536 Brian Ballach laid siege to Caste Carha and demolished it, re-establishing Dromahair's dominion over the entire kingdom. Feidhlimidh was deposed and died that same year as a prisoner of Brian Ballach.

==== Resolution ====
The rivalry between these branches ultimately ended in victory for the O’Rourkes of Dromahair and a return to stability in the succession of kings in the 1530s. Following the defeat of Lochlainn Ó Ruairc of Carrigallen in 1458 and the dissolution of his kingdom, the Carrigallen O’Rourkes ceased to rule over Breifne ever again. The O’Rourkes of Carha were wholly crushed by Dromahair in 1536 when Brian Ballach consolidated power over the entire kingdom. These regional conflicts over succession never re-emerged following this due to the changing political landscape in Ireland, as English influence grew in the latter half of the 16th century and the clans united to fight against their encroachments.

Following a period of relative calm, a brief power struggle between the sons of Brian Ballach ensued in the 1560s. Between 1564 and 1566 both Aodh Gallda and Aodh Buidhe were murdered by groups intent on getting Brian na Murtha crowned king. According to the annals, Aodh Gallda was murdered in Leitrim "by his own people". The murder of Aodh Buidhe was carried out by the vassals of Tyrconnell in present-day County Sligo, as Lord Manus O'Donnell's daughter was Brian na Murtha's mother. Following Aodh Buidhe's death, Brian na Murtha was elected king (or lord) of West Breifne in 1566.

== Late history ==
=== Presidency of Connaught ===
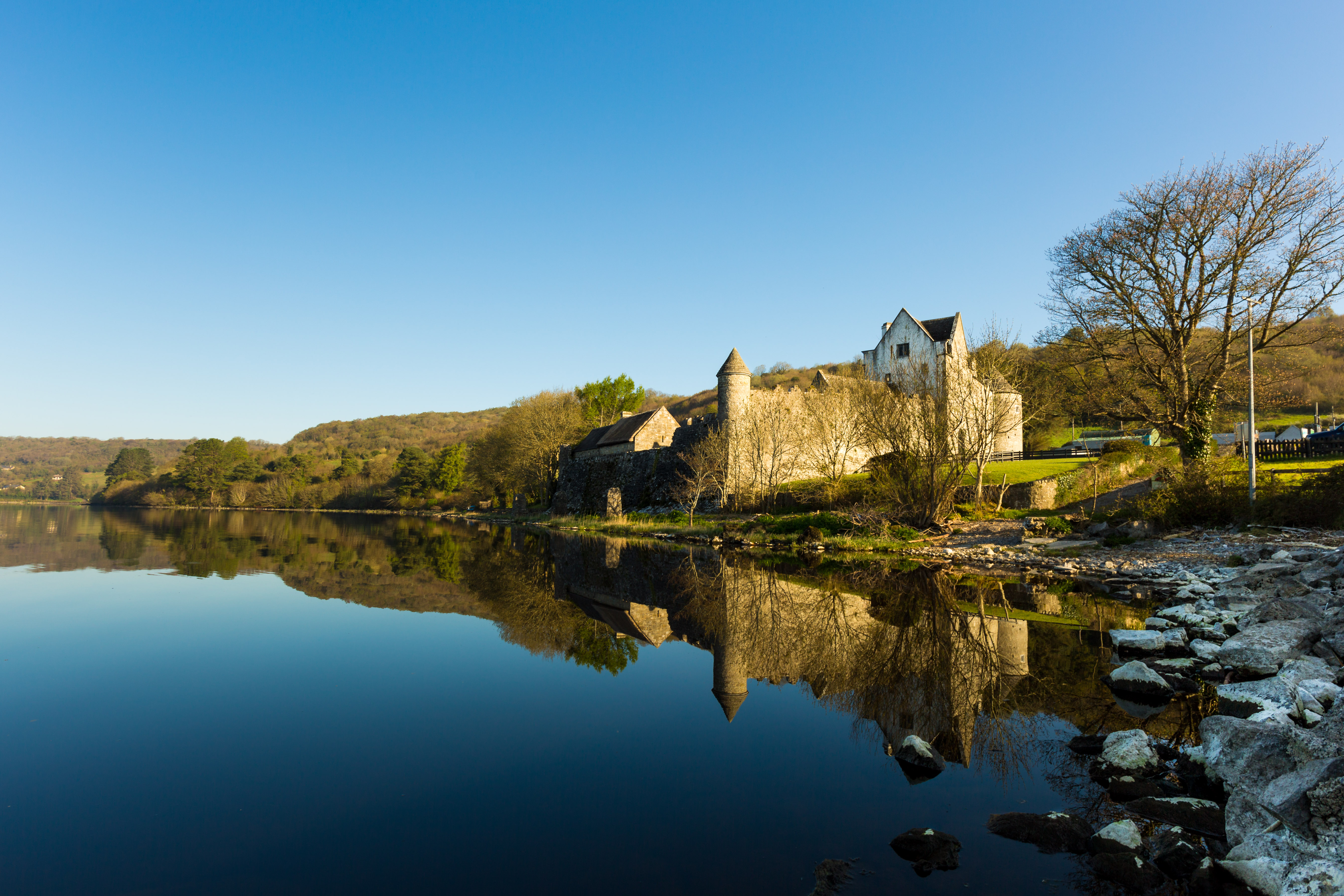
Brian O'Rourke's castle was situated at Lough Gill. The tower house was demolished and Parke's Castle was built in its stead in 1630. The outer walls are all that remains of the original castle.

The expansion of English power in Ireland arrived in West Breifne when Brian Ballach entered an agreement with the English in 1542. Under the terms of this agreement, the O'Rourke king was to keep his authority and traditional rights over the other clans of West Breifne, the sitting O'Rourke king was also to be granted the peerage title "Viscount Dromahaire" and pay a tribute to the crown, however, the terms of this treaty were never realized as the English failed to uphold them.

Lord Deputy John Perrot's unilateral declaration of the legal establishment of County Leitrim in 1565 heralded the first breach of this treaty. After coming to power, Brian na Múrtha Ó Ruairc was knighted by the English in 1567, but came into conflict with them due to the pernicious expansion of their authorities in Ireland. In 1569 West Breifne was subsumed into the Presidency of Connaught, an English government jurisdiction. This governorate was not recognised by the kings and chiefs of Connacht and the first Lord President of Connaught, Sir Edward Fitton, wielded virtually no power over the area. Gradually, many of the Irish kings began to tentatively work with the English (often through coercion), including Brian na Múrtha, who agreed to submit to the first composition of Connacht in 1576. These later submissions bore no resemblance to those agreed by Brian Ballach. Under the 1576 agreement, the king of West Breifne was to answer to the Presidency-appointed High Sheriff of Leitrim, was denied the authority to rule over the other clans and, most crucially, was not allowed to maintain gallowglass.

Nicholas Malby, second Lord President of Connaught, and Brian na Múrtha had a strained relationship. Malby disparagingly referred to Brian na Múrtha as "a nobody....undeserving of his reputation" and remarked that he was "the proudest man this day living on the earth". Upon receiving reports that West Breifne was harbouring coyners and mercenaries, Malby ordered one of his officers to attack the kingdom in April 1578. They captured Leitrim castle, looted it and killed its occupants. This was the first time Tudor soldiers attacked West Breifne and was more about sending a message to Ó Ruairc that his kingdom was not impervious to English power than about tackling coyners. Following the attack, Ó Ruairc sent his son Brian Óg na Samhtach to Dublin to complain on his behalf to Lord Deputy Henry Sidney of harassment by Malby and the Presidency. With Ó Ruairc humbled, Malby agreed to return Leitrim castle to him.

In turn, lands within Connaught were attacked by Ó Ruairc in 1580, illustrating the weakness of the agreement, which collapsed following Malby's death in 1581. Ó Ruairc now viewed both the Lord President of Connaught and the Lord Deputy of Ireland as hostile and from 1578 onwards he ordered the systematic destruction of several castles across the kingdom, including those at Leitrim, Dromahair and Ducarrick out of fear that the English would occupy them.

As part of the policy of surrender and regrant, Ó Ruairc surrendered his lordship on 2 June 1585 at the parliament in Dublin but was never re-granted lordship of County Leitrim, which took its present boundaries in 1583. He was a signatory of the Second Composition of Connaught in 1585, but resisted the appointment of a High Sheriff of Leitrim, and refused to pay rent on large tracts of land. He regarded his agreements with the presidency as non-binding and his relationship with England remained tense. As such, West Breifne existed in a state of semi-autonomy, as both its king and the English regularly signed agreements and failed to live up to those agreements.

Brian na Múrtha was particularly weary of the implementation of English Law over Brehon Law in West Breifne as this would disqualify his favoured son, Brian Óg na Samhtach, an illegitimate child by Annably O’Crean, wife of a Sligo merchant, from inheriting his title. Under English Law, it would pass to his eldest legitimate son, Tadhg O’Rourke, who was only 8 years old in 1585 and living with his mother Mary Bourke, sister of the Earl of Clanricarde and Brian na Murtha's estranged lawful wife.

The already bad relations between Brian na Múrtha and the presidency worsened during the rule of Lord President Sir Richard Bingham. Bingham and Ó Ruairc harboured a deep resentment of one another. Ó Ruairc, who Bingham referred to as a "proud beggar" commanded his forces to attack those of the presidency to halt their excursions into West Breifne, which had become commonplace by this stage, and to end Bingham's incessant harassment of his countrymen. During the Anglo-Spanish War (1585–1604), Brian na Múrtha assisted at least eighty survivors of the Spanish Armada shipwreck off the County Sligo coast to depart the country in the winter of 1588. Among the survivors was Captain Francisco de Cuellar, who kept a detailed account of the events and was hosted in Ó Ruairc's castle at Lough Gill. His aid to the Spanish would later be used against him in his trial for high treason.

In peace talks in 1589, following West Breifne's brief war against the Presidency in April of that year, Ó Ruairc did accept the terms of a crown tribute, but resisted the new composition terms of 1585 and refused to allow the formation of a crown administration in the new County Leitrim. Instead of submitting to the presidency's authority, he sought what effectively amounted to full autonomy from the Kingdom of Ireland in Dublin. However, in the wake of the Spanish landings in Ireland, and due to West Breifne's strategic location between Connacht and Ulster and its pre-existing reputation as a rebellious kingdom, Lord Deputy William Fitzwilliam – who was already aggressively trying to curb the powers of the Gaelic leadership, even those who had sworn loyalty to the crown – commanded Bingham to invade West Breifne. Bingham and his ally Donogh O'Brien, 4th Earl of Thomond, invaded the territory in January 1590 and had forced Ó Ruairc to flee by March.

=== Lords in exile ===
He was given refuge by Eoghan Óg, Chief of Mac Suibhne na d’Tuath, and stayed in his castle on the western shores of Tyrconnell for a year. He travelled to Scotland in February 1591 bearing gifts (including four Irish Wolfhounds), in anticipation of a meeting with King James VI, seeking to raise an army of mercenaries and retake his kingdom. In consultation with the English ambassador, King James VI denied him an audience and was pressured by Queen Elizabeth I to arrest him and deliver him to England, citing the agreements made in the Treaty of Berwick. After much debate and controversy, Ó Ruairc was arrested in Glasgow on 3 April 1591 and delivered into English custody. He was kept at the Tower of London and was put on trial and asked to pledge to the crown, accepting all prior agreements, and to denounce his Catholic faith. In response, he refused to recognise the authority of the court or Elizabeth and did not plead mercy. On charges that he failed to show proper "reverence" to the Queen when he allegedly dragged a portrait of her through the mud and then tore it apart, he responded that there was "a great difference between images of your Queen and those of saints". He was hanged, drawn and quartered for high treason on 3 November 1591.

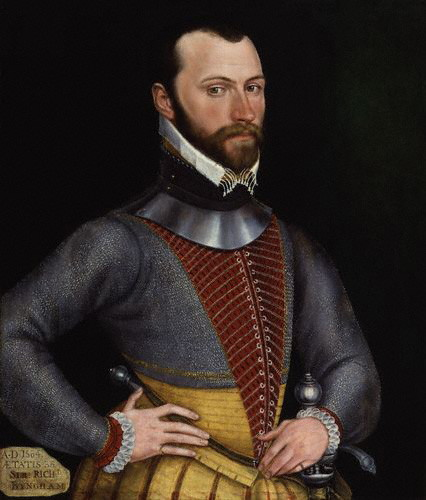
Governor Richard Bingham had a personal enmity with the O'Rourkes and occupied West Breifne from 1590 to early 1593

News of Brian na Múrtha's death was met with shock back in Ireland, the annals describing it as "one of the mournful stories of the Irish". Brian Óg na Samhtach O'Rourke, his son and chief lieutenant during the war against Connaught, was also in exile following Bingham's occupation of West Breifne. The other clans in the kingdom who had fought with Brian na Murtha unconditionally surrendered to Bingham in Athlone shortly after his exile, leaving Brian Óg with little support. Bingham described O’Rourke and his remaining followers as "80 beggarly traitors".

He was however, supported by the O’Donnells and Maguires in neighbouring Tyrconnell, where he was living in exile and, with the tacit support of Tyrconnell, carrying out guerilla attacks on West Breifne from 1590 to 1592. On 3 April 1592, he wrote to the Privy Council of Ireland unsuccessfully pleading with them to pardon him of any wrongdoing during the war in 1589, stating "I did nothing but what my father advised or commanded me to do". The Gaelic lords of Ulster; Hugh O’Donnell, Hugh Maguire and later Hugh O’Neill, arguably the most powerful in all of Ireland, were forming something of a makeshift defensive alliance at this time, laying the foundations for the Alliance of Irish Clans which fought in the Nine Years' War.

They saw Lord Deputy Fitzwilliam's execution of Lord MacMahon and the division of his kingdom (modern-day County Monaghan) into nine parts – amongst eight "loyal" clans and the Barony of Farney which was given to the Earl of Essex – and now the deputy's occupation of West Breifne, as a step too far. The expansionist forces of Fitzwilliam now extended the entire southern border of their kingdoms from Leitrim to Louth – the Tudor Conquest had reached Ulster. Throughout 1591 and 1592, Fitzwilliam and Bingham had drawn up plans for the full annexation of West Breifne into the control of the Kingdom of Ireland, but were forced to abandon these plans and withdraw due to the volatility of the region. This allowed Brian Óg to return to the kingdom and stake his claim as king.

Edmund McGuaran, a prominent Bishop from Tullyhaw in Breifne territory was instrumental in the formation of the Irish alliance. He spent much of the 1580s in Madrid, persuading King Philip II of Spain to support the Gaelic kingdoms militarily, framing the conflict between them and England as a defence of Catholicism. O’Neill, O’Donnell and O’Rourke would all pledge their allegiance to the Spanish king in 1595. O’Rourke promised to be "a most faithful and obedient servant" of Philip II. Were it not for England's desperation to see peace return to Ireland following the war, this would have surely seen them executed for treason. McGuaran travelled to Rome and was made Archbishop of Armagh, Primate of All Ireland in July 1587 before returning to Ireland by 1592.

== West Breifne during the Nine Years' War ==
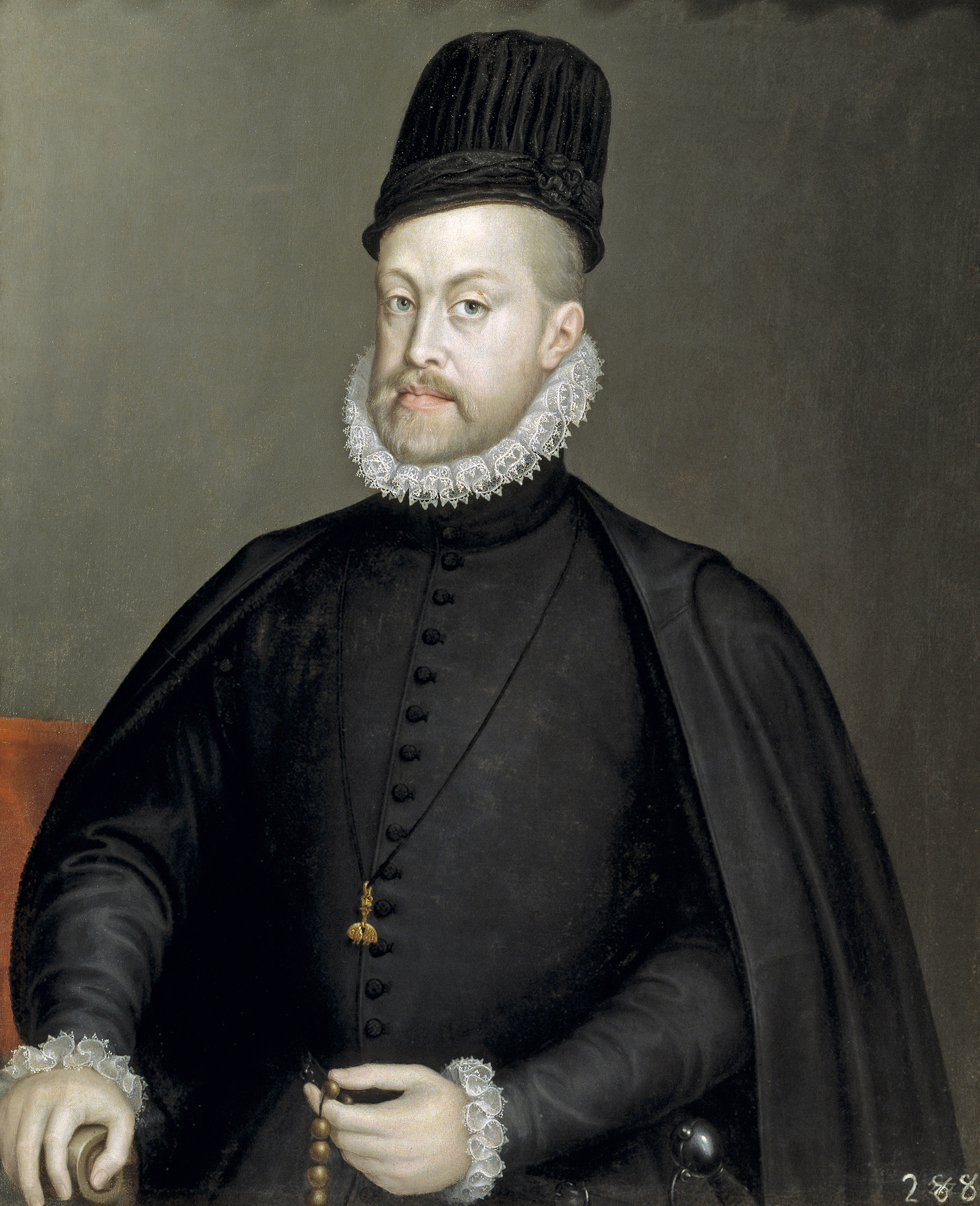
Brian Óg O'Rourke and the other rebel lords pledged their allegiance to Philip II of Spain (pictured) and had regular correspondence with him

=== Gaelic success 1593–1597 ===
Sir George Bingham, brother of Richard and High Sheriff of Sligo based in Ballymote, and Brian Óg O’Rourke carried out the first acts of what was to become the Nine Years' War. George Bingham led an expedition into West Breifne and seized O’Rourke's milch cows in lieu of unpaid rent. O’Rourke responded by hiring an army of mercenaries from Tyrconnell, Tyrone and Fermanagh, and set out with 1,100 men to Sligo in May 1593 and "there was little of that country which he did not plunder" – razing 13 villages and ransacking Ballymote itself. This was quickly followed by another excursion into Connaught, this time by Hugh Maguire who routed Sir Richard Bingham's forces near Tulsk, County Roscommon. In the wake of these two consecutive defeats in May and June, Fitzwilliam offered Maguire and O’Rourke a white peace if Maguire disbanded the army he had assembled. His acceptance of this became the first of a number of ceasefires that characterized the Nine Years' War, where both England and the Irish lords had no intention of making peace but rather used the time to recover and regroup forces.

In September Maguire restarted his campaign and raided Monaghan, but by February 1594 Hugh Maguire, Brian Óg's primary patron, had lost Enniskillen and was on the brink of defeat. The possibility of Maguire's collapse, leaving the English on his doorstep, prompted Hugh Roe O’Donnell to intervene and by June 1594 the tide of war had turned again, they had retaken Enniskillen and soundly defeated the English army at Bel-Atha-na-mBriosgaidh, forcing them to retreat over the Arney River back into Cavan. Brian Óg himself spent 1594 in West Breifne and the northwest of Ireland, writing letters to other lords trying to convince them to join the war against England.

By 1595 O’Donnell was firmly in control of West Breifne. O’Rourke, although allied to him, was completely dependent upon him. The kingdom was devastated after over a decade of intermittent war and O’Rourke was unable to raise soldiers himself and was given little of the spoils of war that O’Donnell and O’Neill had reaped. Many of the clans of West Breifne who had sworn loyalty to the English allied themselves with O’Donnell. The kingdom was frequently used as the route through which the Irish forces would travel to raid Connaught, before being used as a staging ground by O’Donnell to attack Annaly, Longford and Cavan. In June 1595 Sligo Castle fell to O’Donnell and Sir George Bingham was killed. By 1596 West Breifne was part of what Richard Bingham termed "O’Donnell's Commonwealth" which, along with Tyrconnell itself, now included present-day counties Leitrim, Sligo, Mayo and Northern Roscommon – all territories that were firmly under Bingham's control just 3 years prior.

=== Truce of 1597–1598 ===
Bingham was relieved of his command and replaced by Sir Conyers Clifford in 1597, by which time O’Donnell had completely pushed the English out of Connacht. Despite early setbacks, by October 1597 the English were back in control of Connacht, due to the changing allegiance of the O’Conors of Sligo and the Burkes of Galway who turned on O’Donnell's allied lords in Connacht and forced them to retreat. This success was a result of Clifford's conciliatory approach to the Irish lords, favouring negotiation over conflict. In a letter to William Cecil, Chief Advisor of Queen Elizabeth, Clifford declared that all of Connacht was pacified, save Brian Óg O’Rourke, who Clifford was trying to win over to the English side.

The war had quieted down because of a truce signed between the English and rebel Irish lords in October 1597 that was set to expire in June 1598. In November 1597 Brian Óg, in a letter to Clifford, wrote that he would capitulate if the English were willing to guarantee the return of all of his father's lands and recognize him, and not his half-brother Tadhg, as the legitimate heir under English Law and compromise on reduced taxes on those lands. Up until now, any English assurances to O’Rourke were meaningless, as he knew they had no power to protect him from O’Donnell were he to switch allegiance. Upon receiving this offer Clifford immediately wrote to Cecil asking him to grant all of these requests. In December, Clifford was granted full authority to make peace with O’Rourke "as soon as possible" and "assure him his lands". In February 1598, O’Rourke, accompanied by thirty West Breifne nobles, travelled to Boyle and submitted to Clifford, handing over the letters he had received from Philip II of Spain as a sign of his allegiance.

O’Rourke's fourteen demands, all of which were granted by Queen Elizabeth, included the stationing of English soldiers in his territory under his control to protect him from O’Neill and O’Donnell, a pardon for him and all his followers, a guarantee that he could not be charged or arrested by anyone, except on the orders of the Queen herself, and assurance that he would be given a pension to live on should O’Donnell or O’Neill seize his lands in retaliation. For his part, O’Rourke was tasked with delivering pledges of loyalty to the crown from all the major clans of West Breifne within twenty days. The treaty was an immense victory for O’Rourke. In contrast to the situation 3 years earlier, the once desolate kingdom of West Breifne was now more prosperous than anywhere in Connacht, having recovered from the devastation wrought by Bingham and had been relatively untouched by the war in the last four years.

=== Resumption of hostilities ===
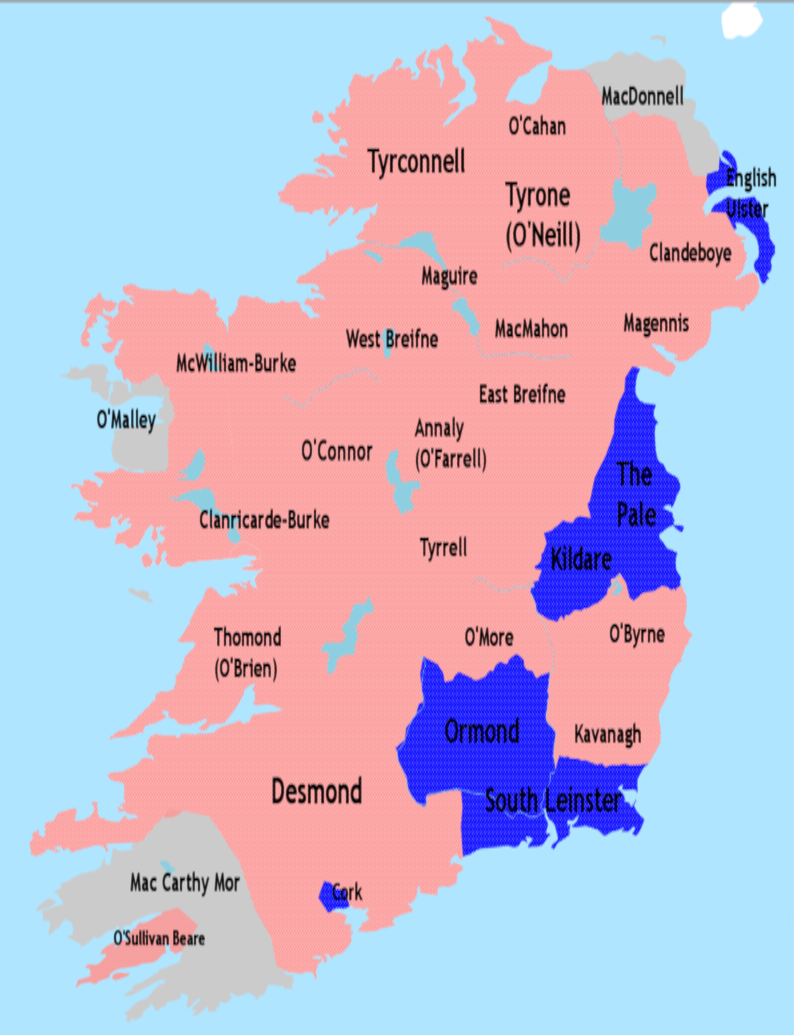
Nine Years' War – January 1600. Red – Extent of effective Irish control Blue – Extent of effective English control

The agreement was not to last and West Breifne switched allegiance back to the Irish Alliance shortly before the expiration of the ceasefire on 7 June 1598. This betrayal of the English was a pragmatic choice as O'Rourke felt Clifford could not deliver on his promises. Firstly, he feared their weakness in the face of Tyrone and Tyrconnell, the latter of which was hosting his brother Tadhg and would surely make him king over Brian Óg in the event of a war. Lord Chancellor Adam Loftus had denied Clifford's request to provide O'Rourke with a garrison of 1,200 men. Secondly, in spite of the agreement that had been reached, O'Rourke wrote to Clifford stating he had discovered that Thomas Butler, Earl of Ormonde, had assured Mary Bourke (Tadhg's mother) that he would support Tadhg's claim as king of West Breifne. Clifford blamed both men for O'Rourke's defection back to the rebels. Brian Óg's fears proved correct as by early 1599, the rebel Irish lords were in complete control of Ulster and Connacht and raiding as far south as historic Thomond, before occupying Munster and most of Leinster the following year. The war was also placing a huge financial burden on England and by the war's end the English exchequer was near bankruptcy, having spent almost £2 million.

West Breifne's most famous contribution of the war came at The Battle of Curlew Pass. A substantial English force some 2,000-2,500 strong led by Sir Conyers Clifford was travelling north only to find that O’Rourke and 400 of his men had barricaded the pass and were guarding it on either side. O’Rourke’s forces, along with those of Hugh O’Donnell, who did not take part in the battle, decisively defeated the English who were forced to retreat. Losses were minimal for the Irish and estimated to be around 500, but possibly as high as 1,400 for the English. Clifford was left mortally wounded and Brian Óg ordered his head to be cut off and sent to O'Donnell, who in turn sent it to the besieged O'Conors in Sligo as a message that no English help was coming. O'Conor surrendered shortly afterwards. Clifford's body was honourably buried at the monastery in Lough Key and his "tragic death....was much lamented" by the Irish lords, as the man had "never told them a falsehood". O’Rourke and O’Donnell were not on good terms at this time. Brian Óg's rival to the kingship, Tadhg, had married O’Donnell's sister Mary and was staying with her in Tyrconnell. Coeval correspondence between the English command mentions multiple disagreements between Brian Óg and Hugh Roe. Despite this tension, their alliance persisted for the duration of the war.

=== Fall of the alliance 1600–1603 ===
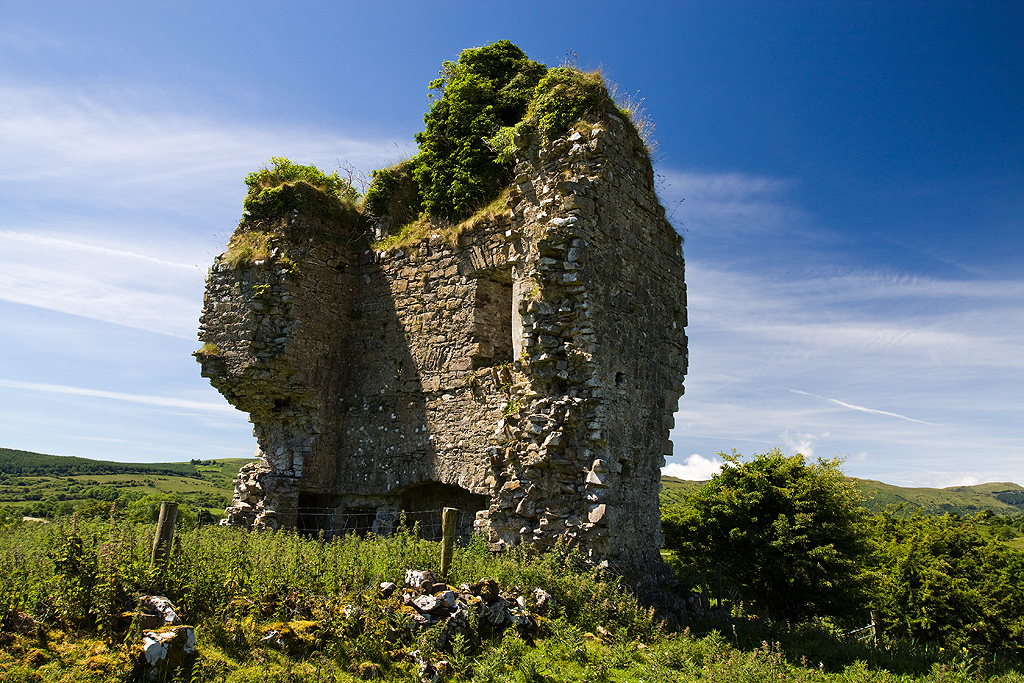
Ruins of an O'Rourke Tower House at Castletown. For roughly a month from March–April 1603 West Breifne remained the sole Irish lordship left in the war

By late 1600 the tide of war had turned against the Irish Alliance. The English stepped up their campaign, stationing 18,000 soldiers in Ireland on top of the thousands of Irish infantry already at their disposal, and had wrested more Irish lords from O’Neill and O’Donnell, most notably Niall Garbh, who betrayed the alliance and allowed the forces of Henry Docwra to land at Lough Foyle. The new commander of the English forces in Ireland Charles Blount, 8th Baron Mountjoy, employed a scorched earth policy which hit the Irish civilian and military population hard. Clandeboye, the primary breadbasket of the Ulster allies, was invaded and had its crops burnt, livestock slaughtered and villages torched, leading to a famine in Ulster which took the lives of 60,000 people in 1602–03. Docwra meanwhile set up a series of fortifications along the River Foyle, cutting access between Tyrone and Tyrconnell. In the context of West Breifne they plotted to exploit the tension between Tadhg and Brian Óg O’Rourke. In January 1601 Tadhg O’Rourke was given 800 men by O’Donnell to revive the rebellion in Munster, his campaign there was a disaster and he returned to Ulster in the summer having lost 500 men. Upon his return it was announced that the brothers had reconciled.

However, Brian Óg was to travel south with O’Donnell in December to take part in the ill-fated Battle of Kinsale and while Brian Óg was away, Tadhg had defected to the English and claimed the kingship of West Breifne for himself with the support of his mother's family the Burkes of Clanricarde. Hugh Roe left Ireland for Spain following his defeat at Kinsale, leaving Rory O'Donnell, 1st Earl of Tyrconnell in charge of Tyrconnell. The English plan of bringing Irish lordships onto their side, thus dividing the alliance, had largely succeeded across the island and Brian Óg was forced to return to West Breifne and restate his authority as king by force. After ousting Tadhg, Brian Óg was called upon by Rory O'Donnell to assist him and provide him with soldiers in early 1602 but O'Rourke refused and remained in West Breifne to "protect his people". The Alliance of Irish clans that was on the cusp of victory just one year earlier had disintegrated.

By the end of June 1602, Mountjoy was writing triumphant letters to Treasurer George Carey from Tyrone's capital Dungannon. By January 1603 Brian Óg, in a turn of events for the once exiled lord, now harboured the ousted lords Maguire, O’Sullivan and Tyrrell within his kingdom. They wished to regroup and join up with the remaining forces of Hugh O’Neill but unbeknownst to them O’Neill had already left for Mellifont to surrender.

West Breifne was now the only Irish kingdom that had not yet surrendered. Brian Óg continued the revolt knowing that his legitimate, well-connected, loyalist half-brother Tadhg would receive his lands were he to surrender now, but the odds were stacked impossibly against him. At the end of March 1603, the invasion of West Breifne began. A force of 3,000 men led by Tadhg, the now-loyalist Rory O’Donnell and Henry Folliott, were prevented from crossing the River Shannon for twelve days by O'Rourke's entrenched forces. Eventually, an English garrison broke through their defences and fortified themselves in northern Leitrim at a church in Black Pig's Dyke. O'Rourke and forces loyal to him were holed up in their keeps as the countryside of West Breifne was ravaged by attacks. On 25 April 1603, Mountjoy reported that Brian Óg had been toppled, forced into the forests like "a wood kerne". West Breifne's resistance was ultimately broken and Brian Óg fled.

The ousted Brian Óg again sought to strike a deal with the English allowing him to keep his lands but this was flatly refused. Finally, in September 1603, King James I granted Sir Tadhg O’Rourke "the country or lordship of Breny Ui Ruairc and Muinter Eoluis". On 28 January 1604 Brian Óg died of fever in exile in Galway and was buried in the Friary of Ross Errilly.

== Aftermath ==
=== Decline ===
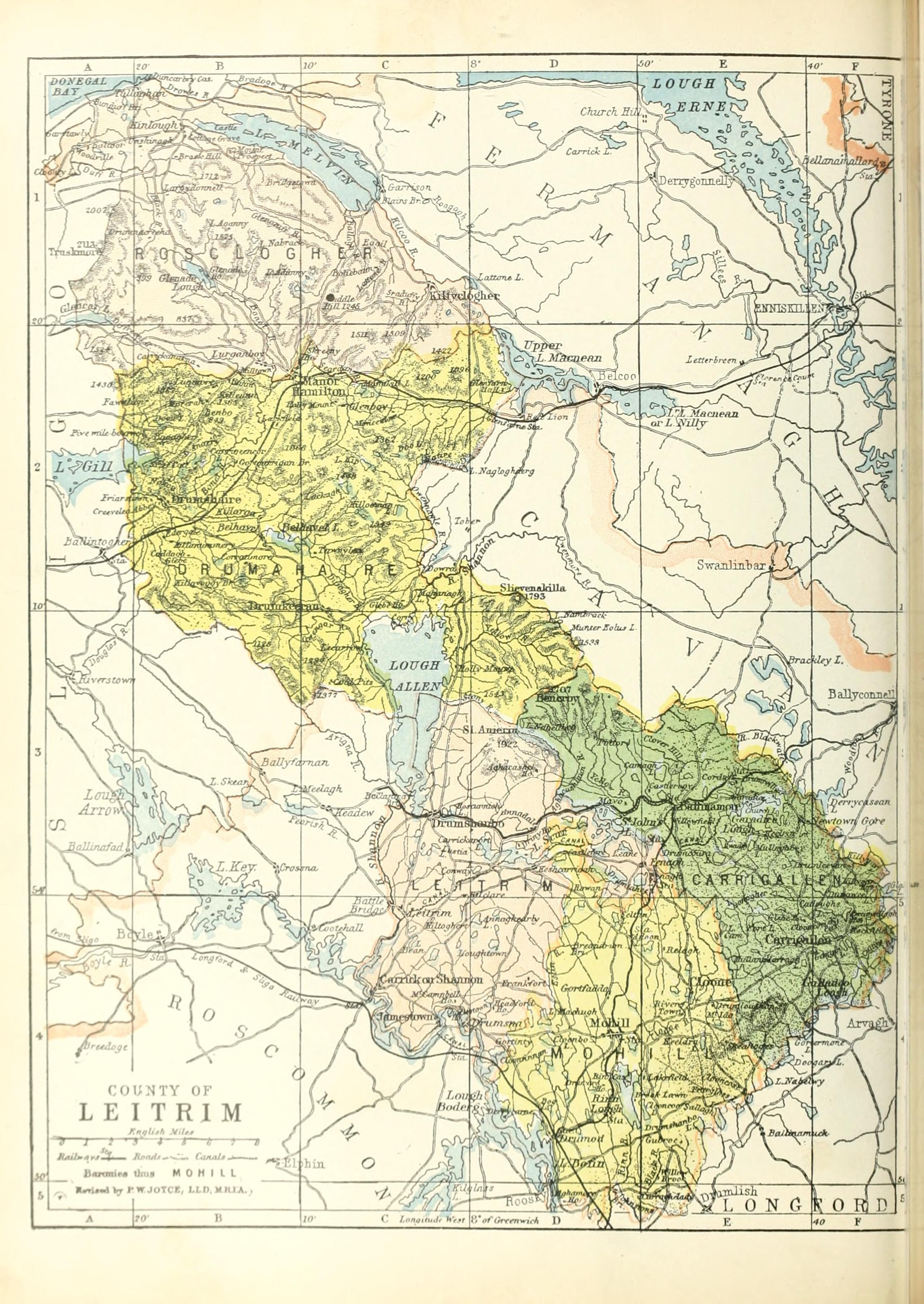
County Leitrim was divided into Baronies following its conquest

After defeat in the Nine Years' War, the total implementation of English Law across Ireland was inevitable and the Gaelic political order collapsed. Many O'Rourke nobles left for mainland Europe and the clans throughout Ireland went into a steady decline culminating in The Flight of the Earls in 1607. The clans within West Breifne were granted land and assurances of their rights to pass on that land to their eldest son under English law in exchange for pledging loyalty to the Crown, circumventing the authority of the ruling O’Rourke dynasty – the same form of divide and rule that was first adopted by the English government in Ireland following their occupation of MacMahon territory in County Monaghan in 1590. Each of these clans held only modest estates and could not properly threaten English authority or raise armies and amass wealth through taxation like the larger Gaelic kingdoms could. The O’Rourke's had been relegated to large landowners within County Leitrim, with no official authority over the other clans and a vastly reduced tax base, land area and population. The kingdom was effectively over.

In late 1605, Sir Tadhg O’Rourke suddenly fell terminally ill and died aged 28, rumours of his poisoning abound – especially given the extraordinary circumstances that would lead to the dispossession of his sons and the subsequent Plantation of Leitrim. Sir Tadhg had two sons, Brian and Aedh. Brian was to inherit his father's title and lands but, as he was only 6 years old at the time, his father's cousin, the 4th Earl of Clanricarde, was given wardship of the boys on 11 February 1606. Brian and his brother Aedh were to fall victim to the plotting of Sir John Davies, the Attorney-General for Ireland, who set about undoing the "distasteful settlements" reached with the native Irish lords in the Treaty of Mellifont through legal means.

His opportunity arose when questions over the legitimacy of Brian and Aedh were raised as their mother, Mary, was twice divorced before her marriage to Tadhg. If these divorces were not recognised by English Law it was possible to revoke the patent of the O’Rourke children. Lord Deputy Sir Arthur Chichester was anxious to pacify the wilderness of O’Rourke's country which was a "den of outlaws and malefactors" where "no Englishmen dwell". Wealthy speculators were equally as anxious to open County Leitrim up to plantations.

With their power over Ireland firmly established, many within the English government and legal system began a covert effort to dispossess the Irish heirs of rebellious lords – such as those who took part in the Nine Years' War – and pass their land on to English and Scottish Protestant settlers. Lord Clanricarde protested their machinations, arguing that no moves to dispossess Brian should be made until he turns twenty-one.

In November 1616, Brian O’Rourke was ordered to England by King James I. As a knight of the English realm, James felt O’Rourke should receive an English education in Oxford University, and Lord Clanricarde was to pay for his tuition. In November 1618, while Brian was still in college and still the legal heir, the English government in Ireland, led by Sir Oliver St. John, were surveying and "mapping" County Leitrim for plantation. Following an altercation in Oxford on St. Patrick’s Day in March 1619, O’Rourke was arrested and charged with battery. He was ordered to pay an unprecedented £250 each to the three claimants. Despite being known personally to James I and despite Clanricarde agreeing to pay the court's recommended settlement of £50 to each claimant followed by another £50 within a year of O’Rourke's release, the claimants refused and he remained in prison at Gatehouse. Predictably, later that year, a jury found that Mary O’Donnell's divorce of her first husband Donal O’Cahan was void, therefore her marriage to Tadhg was not recognised and their two sons, Brian and Aedh, were declared illegitimate.

=== Plantations of Leitrim ===
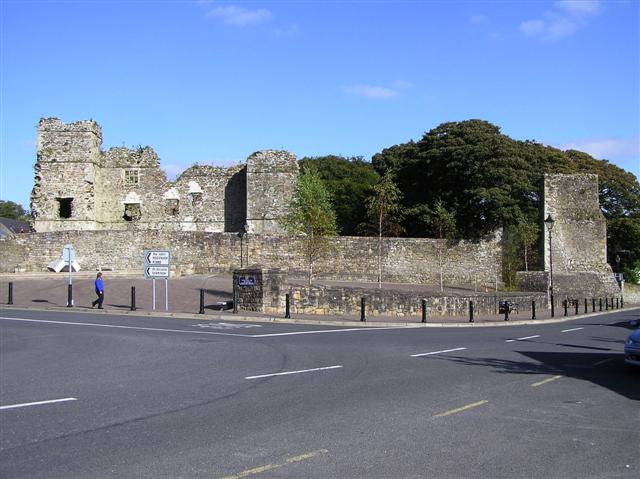
Settler towns such as Jamestown and Manorhamilton (pictured) were founded during the plantations

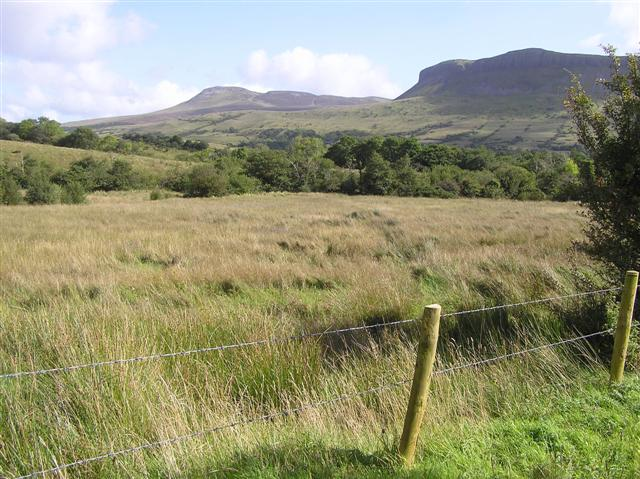
Leitrim's rugged landscape was considered poor quality and as such the individual plantations granted were larger than usually given elsewhere in Ireland

Brian was moved to the Tower of London on unspecified charges and his situation was made worse by renewed tensions between England and Spain, who would go to war in 1625. The O’Rourke nobles who fled to Spain and were fighting in the Irish Regiment as well as West Breifne's history of aiding the Spanish in Ireland was emphasized by those who benefitted from O’Rourke's downfall and wished to see him remain incarcerated.

Lord Justice Sir William Parsons travelled to London in February 1621 to convince the 1st Marquess of Buckingham (later created, in 1623, the 1st Duke of Buckingham), the King's favourite, to support the foundation of a new agency, the Irish Court of Wards, which would pave the way for new plantations in Ireland. By supporting these plantations, Lord Buckingham, as he then was, could ensure that he would benefit handsomely. With no "legitimate" heirs and the remaining O’Rourke nobles in County Leitrim disassociating themselves from Brian in exchange for the security of their own lands, the plantations officially began in August 1621. Within a few weeks County Leitrim's approximately 400,000 acres had been divided. Half of the county (50 grants) was given to Protestant British settlers and the other half (151 grants) to the natives in a complete restructuring of the land.

Brian's brother Aedh was also placed in the spotlight. Aedh was living with his mother and her fifth husband in County Mayo, but also intermittently in County Leitrim. In June 1624, the 1st Viscount Falkland, the then Lord Deputy of Ireland, encouraged Aedh to travel to Dublin to discuss the legal situation regarding his inheritance. Although Aedh had been officially declared illegitimate by the English Crown, Lord Falkland feared that in the event of an invasion by Spain and a rebellion by Aedh O’Rourke, he would be "exceedingly followed by the Irish". Conscious of his brother's situation, he initially declined.

He arrived in Dublin in May 1626 and impressed both Lord Falkland and the Privy Council of Ireland. Falkland sent him, along with his cousin Con O’Donnell, heir of Tyrconnell, to London, confident that they could be convinced to relinquish their claims. At Hampton Court, Aedh refused to give up his claim to his father's lands in the Barony of Drumahaire, County Leitrim, which had already been settled by British plantation owners and was jailed. He would have met the same fate as his brother were it not for his cousin Mary Stuart O'Donnell, a dissident Irish Catholic living in England, who orchestrated his escape. With her help, Aedh fled to Flanders and joined the Spanish army.

Brian meanwhile continued to languish in prison, writing to King Charles I and other English officials, petitioning them for a speedy trial so he could face his accusers, secure his freedom and recover his land. Ignorant of what had transpired in County Leitrim in his absence, he also wrote to Buckingham, the effective chief minister, who had been given 4,500 acres of O’Rourke's estate, pleading for a trial which he never received. He died in the Tower of London in December 1641, having spent 22 of his 42-year life in prison.

The last legacy of the Dromahair O’Rourke lords during the plantations was the land allocated to their widows. Mary O’Donnell, mother of Brian and Aedh and widow of King Tadhg (1603–1605) was granted 1,600 acres and Mary Maguire, widow of King Brian Óg (1591–1603) was granted 700. Tiernan, grandson of King Feidhlimidh (1528–1536), the last of the Carha line, was granted land in the Barony of Rosclogher in 1622 and in 1629 Shane Óg, descendant of the Carrigallen O'Rourkes, received 1,800 acres in Carrigallen. Three other natives of former West Breifne; Elizabeth Duff, Catherine Glanchy and Mary Crofton were granted 4,000 acres between them. The largest landowner was Scottish noble Sir Frederick Hamilton, who founded Manorhamilton on the banks of the Owenbeg River. He received 6,500 acres but would later grow this to over 18,000 acres.

Many stately homes and large castles, such as Parke's Castle, Manorhamilton Castle and Lough Rynn Castle, were built by British Protestant settlers during the plantations. By 1641, 63.5% of County Leitrim was owned by Protestants and 31.1% was owned by Catholics, with 5.3% not surveyed. Following the Cromwellian conquest of Ireland from 1649 to 1653 and the subsequent Down Survey of 1656–1658, a nationwide survey which measured the land which was to be forfeited by the native Irish, the land held by settlers would increase even further. By 1670 the land held by Catholics in Leitrim had fallen to 8%, with 86.3% held by Protestants and 5.6% not surveyed.

== Clans of West Breifne ==
A topographical poem written by John Ó Dubhagain and Giolla na naomh Ó Huidhrin in the 14th century outlines the major clans that inhabited the Breifne region (both East and West) at that time. Other sources that document the clans within Breifne are Onomasticon Goedelicum, compiled by Edmund Hogan in 1910 and the multitude of references to various clans and their locations that exist in the Irish annals. This list documents those clans that inhabited West Breifne, which was colloquially referred to as Breifne O'Rourke as they were the overlords of the kingdom, but numerous other clans that held distinct territories were also present.

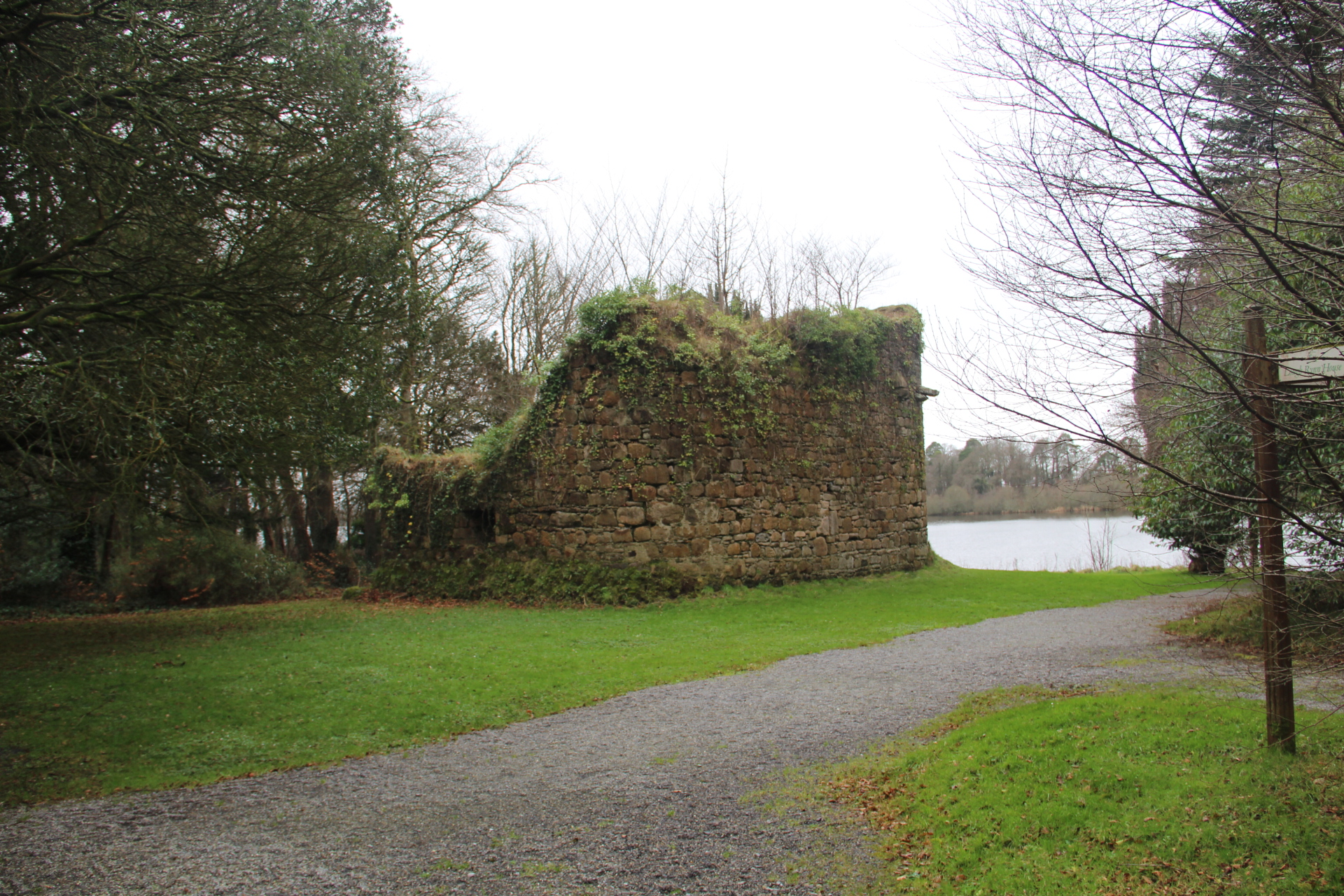
The remains of Mac Raghnaill Castle. The clan were chiefs of Muintir Eolais

For most of its history, West Breifne's territory contained the Cavan baronies of Tullyhaw and Tullyhunco, as well as a small portion of County Sligo. Therefore, the clans in these areas were part of the kingdom, but their territories are no longer contained within County Leitrim, which is roughly based on the boundaries West Breifne had when the county was created in 1583.

=== County Leitrim ===
- Ua/Ó Ruairc (O'Rourke, Rourke, Rorke, Roark, Rork) hereditary kings of West Breifne, descendants of Uí Briúin Bréifne
- Mac Raghnaill (Reynolds, MacReynolds, many other variants) chiefs of Muintir Eolais – modern day baronies of Leitrim and Mohill
- Mac Conshámha (McKenny, Ford, Keany) originate in Innismagrath in the barony of Dromahair
- Mac Cagadháin (MacCogan, McEgan) based at Glenfarne (Clann Fearmaighe) in Dromahair
- Mac Dorchadha (MacDarcy, Darcy) chiefs of Cineal Luachain, based in the barony of Mohill.
- Mac Flannchadha (MacClancy, Clancy) chiefs of Dartraidhe, whose territory corresponds to the barony of Rosclogher (not to be confused with Dartraighe, County Monaghan)
- Ó Maoilmiadhaigh (Mulvey) chiefs of Tellach Cerbhalláin (Moynish) in the barony of Leitrim
- Mac Fionnbhair (Gaynor, MacGinver, Finvar, Finnevar) mostly based in County Longford but held lands in southern Leitrim
- Mac Maoilliosa (Mallison, Mellows, Mellowes) chiefs of Magh Breacraighe, a border region between Leitrim and Longford
- Mac Fergus (Ferguson) originate in Rossinver
- Ó Curnín (Courneen, Corneen, Coorneen, Curne, Curran), bards to the O'Rourkes

=== County Cavan ===
- Mac Tighearnain (McKiernan Clan, McTiernan, MacTiernan, McKiernan) chiefs of Teallach Dunchadha – modern day Tullyhunco
- Mac Samhradhain (MacGuaran, McGurran, McGurn, McGovern, Magauran) chiefs of Teallach Eachdhach – modern-day Tullyhaw

=== County Sligo ===
- Ó Finn (O'Finn, Finn), joint chiefs of Cálraighe, based at Drumlease, County Leitrim and Calry, County Sligo
- Ó Cearbhaill (O'Carroll, Carroll, Carrell), joint chiefs of Cálraighe

== Kings (Lords) of Breifne O'Rourke ==
The following is a list of the kings of West Breifne, an Irish kingdom situated in modern County Leitrim.
Dromahair in italics denotes post Ualgarg mor kings who ruled from the capital Dromahair before the term "O'Rourkes of Dromahair" was in use.

Name	Reign	Lineage	House/Branch	Description
Conchobar	1250–1257	son of Tigernán son of Domnall		Deposed
Sitric	1257	son of Ualgarg son of Cathal		Murdered
Amlaíb	1257–1258	son of Art son of Domnall son of Fergal		
Domnall	1258	son of Conchobar son of Tigernán		Deposed
Art	1258–1259	son of Cathal riabach son of Donnchadh		Deposed
Domnall	1259–1260	son of Conchobar son of Tigernán		Killed
Art bec	1260	son of Art son of Domnall son of Fergal		
Art	1261–1266	son of Cathal riabach son of Donnchadh		Deposed
Conchobar buide	1266–1273	son of Amlaíb son of Art		
Tigernán	1273–1274	son of Aedh son of Ualgarg son of Cathal		
Art	1275	son of Cathal riabach son of Donnchadh		Killed †
Amlaíb	1275–1307	son of Art son of Cathal riabach		Killed †
Domnall carrach	1307–1311	son of Amlaíb son of Art		
Ualgarg Mór	1316–1346	son of Domnall carrach		Killed †
Flaithbheartach	1346–1349	son of Domnall carrach	Dromahair	Deposed
Aodh bán	1349–1352	son of Ualgarg Mór son of Domnall	Dromahair	Killed †
Flaithbheartach	1352	son of Domnall carrach	Dromahair	
Tadhg na gCaor	1352–1376	son of Ualgarg Mór son of Domnall carrach	Carrigallen	
Tigernán Mór	1376–1418	son of Ualgarg mór son of Domnall carrach	Dromahair	
Aodh buidhe	1418–1419	son of Tigernán Mór	Dromahair	
Art	1419–1424	son of Tadhg na gCaor	Carrigallen	Elected (Kingship Disputed) (Note: Following the death of King Aedh buidhe in 1419, the O'Rourkes in Northern County Leitrim elected Tadhg O'Rourke, Aedh buidhe's brother, as King. In Southern Leitrim, Art O'Rourke, son of King Tadgh na gcoar (1352–1376), was elected King by his supporters. The Kingdom divided into "East Breifne O'Rourke" and "West Breifne O'Rourke" for several years until 1424, when Art O'Rourke submitted kingship to Tadhg O'Rourke.)
Tadhg	1419–1435	son of Tigernán Mór	Dromahair	Elected (Kingship Disputed) (Note: King Tadhg reigned from 1419 to 1424 as King of the western half of West Breifne (the area encompassing modern day County Leitrim west of Lough Allen) From 1424 to 1435, he ruled over the whole kingdom.)
Lochlann O'Rourke	1435–1458	son of Tadhg na gCaor	Carrigallen	King of East Breifne O'Rourke (Note: Following the death of King Tadhg O'Rourke in 1435, kingship was again in dispute between East and West. The Kingdom of West Breifne was divided between East and West for 23 years until 1458, when East Breifne O'Rourke were defeated and their kingdom was dissolved.)
Donnchadh bacagh	1435–1445	son of Tigernán Mór	Dromahair	King of West Breifne O'Rourke
Donnchadh	1445–1449	son of Tigernán oge son of Tigernán Mór	Carha	King of West Breifne O'Rourke
Tigernán óg	1449–1468	son of Tadhg son of Tigernán Mór	Dromahair	(Note: Tigernán óg ruled as King of West Breifne O'Rourke from 1449 to 1458 and as King of a united West Breifne from 1458 to 1468.)
Domnall	1468–1476	son of Tadhg son of Tigernán Mór	Dromahair	Kingship disputed (Note: Following the death of King Tigernán óg in 1468, kingship was again in dispute, this time between Domnall, Tigernán óg's brother who was supported by the O'Rourkes of Dromahair (the main line), and Donnchadh losc, son of King Tigernán mór (1376–1418) who was supported by fierce rivals of the main line, the O'Rourkes of Carha. This dispute caused infighting within West Breifne and left a deepened rivalry between the O'Rourkes of Dromahair and the O'Rourkes of Carha. The dispute ended in a victory for the O'Rourkes of Carha and the crowning of King Feidhlimidh in 1476.)
Donnchadh losc	1468–1476	son of Tigernán mór son of Ualgarg Mór	Dromahair	Kingship disputed
Feidhlimidh mac Donnchadha	1476–1500	son of Donnchadh son of Tigernán oge	Carha	
Eóghan	1500–1528	son of Tigernán óg son of Tadhg	Dromahair	
Feidhlimidh	1528–1536	son of Feidhlimidh son of Donnchadh	Carha	Deposed (Note: Ruled as de facto king of Carha and its environs until he was defeated and imprisoned by Brian Ballach)
Brian Ballach	1528–1559	son of Eóghan son of Tigernán óg	Dromahair	
Tadhg	1559–1560	son of Brian ballach	Dromahair	
Brian Ballach	1560–1562	son of Eóghan son of Tigernán óg	Dromahair	
Aodh Gallda	1562–1564	son of Brian ballach	Dromahair	Assassinated
Aodh Buidhe	1564–1566	son of Brian ballach	Dromahair	Assassinated
Brian na Murtha	1566–1591	son of Brian ballach	Dromahair	Executed (Note: Hanged by the Kingdom of England in London for treason against the Queen's Law in 1591.)
Brian Óg na Samhthach	1591–1603	son Brian na Murtha	Dromahair	Deposed
Tadhg	1603–1605	son of Brian na múrtha	Dromahair	(Note: Suspected assassination by poison)

== Bibliography ==
- Rowe, John Gabriel. The Romance of Irish History. London, 2013
- Casway, Jerrold. The Last Lords of Leitrim: The Sons of Teige O'Rourke. Breifne Journal Vol. VII, 1988.
- Falls, Cyril. Elizabeth's Irish Wars. Constable, 1996.
- Gallogy, Dan. Brian Oge O'Rourke and the Nine Years War. Breifne Journal Vol. II, 1963
- Mac Cuarta, Brian. Plantations of Leitrim 1621-41
- Perceval-Maxwell, M. Outbreak of the Irish Rebellion of 1641 McGill-Queen's University Press, 1994
- Welch, Robert Anthony. The Cold of May Day Monday: An Approach to Irish Literary History Oxford University Press, 2014
- Wager, John A. & Schmid, Susan Walter. Encyclopedia of Tudor England, Vol. 1 ABC-CLIO, 2012
