= 1342 in Ireland =

- Centuries: 12th; 13th; 14th; 15th; 16th
- Decades: 1320s; 1330s; 1340s; 1350s; 1360s
- See also: Other events of 1342; List of years in Ireland

Events from the year 1342 in Ireland.

== Incumbent ==
- Lord: Edward III

== Events ==
- King Conchobhar of Tír Conaill is killed and succeeded by his brother, Niall.
- Soldiers from Ireland are sent to campaign for Edward III in Brittany.
- 16 January – 18 May Deputy justiciar John Morice campaigns against the Irish of Mide.
- 5 April – 4th Earl of Kildare is granted livery of his lands.
- after 1 July
  - King Toirdhealbhacf Connacht restores Roscommon castle to William de Bermingham, the royal constable.
- 16 July – 4 September – Deputy justiciar campaigns in Wicklow against the Ó Broin.
- 4 November – King Toirdhealbhach of Connacht is deposed by Mac Diarmata (Eng. MacDermot) and Mac William Burke. Succeeded by Aodh mac Aodh of Clann Mhuircheartaigh.
