= Gilla na Naem Ó Conmaigh =

- Origin: Ireland
- Died: 1360
- Occupation: Musician

Gilla na Naem Ó Conmaigh was an Irish musician who died in 1360.

The Annals of the Four Masters, sub anno 1360, record the death of Gilla-na-naev O'Conmhaigh, Chief Professor of Music in Thomond.

This indicates that Ó Conmaigh was considered the pre-eminent musician and/or musical tutor in Thomond at the time of his death.

The surname is now generally rendered as Conway.

== See also ==
- Music of Ireland
