= 1349 Apennine earthquakes =

Earthquake sequence in Italy

- Location within Italy
- Local date: 9 September 1349
- Magnitude: 6.7
- Epicenter: 41.454308°N 14.123227°E
- Areas affected: Italy (Latium, Molise, Campania, & Abruzzo regions)
- Max. intensity: MMI XI (Extreme)

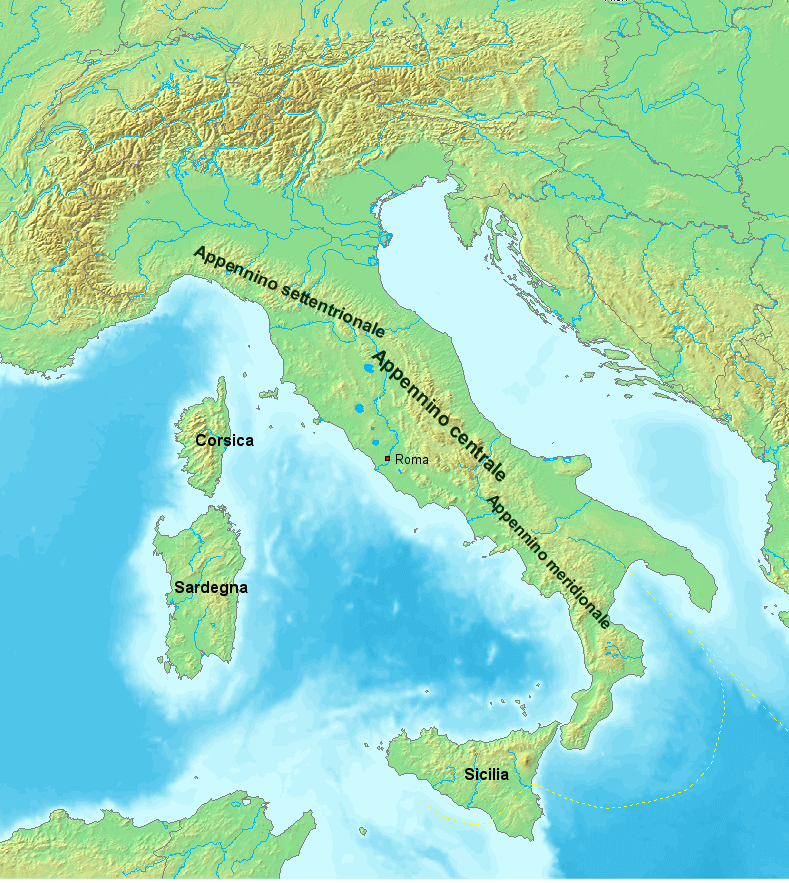
Physical geography of Italy - Apennines

On 9 September 1349, an earthquake sequence began in Italy's Apennine Mountains that severely affected the regions of Molise, Latium and Abruzzo. Probably four moderate-large earthquakes devastated towns and villages across the central Italian Peninsula, with damage even reported in Rome. These earthquakes originated from the Apennine fold and thrust belt fault network, with the first and most destructive shock's epicenter originating from the north-west Campania region. Paleoseismological data gathered from scarping, fault length, and collapsed sections of Venafro's Roman aqueduct indicates the epicenter of the main shock was likely along the Aquae Iuliae fault. The fault suspected of causing this earthquake occurred on the Aqua Iuliae fault along the Molise-Campania border.

== Earthquakes ==
The first earthquake, with an estimated magnitude of 6.7, struck on 9 September in the north-west Campania southeast of the Molisano town of Venafro. The second quake struck on 10 September near L'Aquila. Both quakes caused widespread damage to towns and cities as well as infrastructure such as Roman aqueducts and bridges. The poet Petrarch describes damage in Rome to the city's monuments. The side of the four-story Colosseum collapsed towards the caelian hills, leaving a massive mound of travertine and tufa rubble Rome later quarried for construction materials.

== Aftermath ==
The town of L'Aquila has been described as being almost "completely destroyed." The abbey of Montecassino was also devastated.
