= McGurn =

McGurn is a surname. Notable people with the surname include:

- David McGurn (born 1980), Scottish footballer
- Jack McGurn (1902–1936), alias of born Vincenzo Antonio Gibaldi a Sicilian-American mobster AL Capone mob
- Joe McGurn (1965–2017), Scottish footballer
- William McGurn (born 1958), American political writer

The name of McGurn, McGurran, Maggurran, Magorrin or Magurn, derives from an anglicisation of the older name of Mac-Samhradhain which can be spelled MacGauran, Magauran or McGovern. The owners of this name were chiefs of Teallach Eachach (translated as the tribe or region of the Ecchy) who had their territory in the Barony of "Tullaghagh", County Cavan. This name is pronounced by some people as "Somers", or "Summers" from the word Samhradh, which means summer.

Etymologist Edward MacLysaght has a different view and proposes that the name is also spelled as McGivern, McGurn, Geran, Gerin, or Guerin and is a derivation of an old Gaelic or Viking name. During the 13th century there are references to the tribe of MacSamhradhain (Mac Guaran) who had territory in Teallach Eachdhach which was located in a northerly regions of an area known as Bréifne in topographical poems by O'Dugan.

It is stated that in 1231 that Gilla-Isa Magauran, Lord of Tealach Eachdhach, which was also sometimes called The Kingdom of Glan, died.
In the 13th century the church termoners of the area known as Boho or Botha were known as O Fialáin and Clann Mhe Garacháin over Both Ui Fhialáin.

During the partition of Cavan into seven baronies (1584), two of the baronies are described as 'remotely situated territories in the mountains on the border of O'Rorke's country' going to the Septs of Mac Kernon and Mac Gauran."

Census statistics of the border regions of Fermanagh, in 1610 mention a sept known as Clan McGarraghan in the Baronies of Magheraboy and Clanawley (Kinawley). In the 1660 census of these lands there is also mention of the surname McGwyn and McGunn in Bohue (Boho)which also lies in this border region.

The census of 1766 gives similar-sounding names in this region as spelled M'Gurren, Magorrin and Magorran However, by the time of the Fermanagh census (1910), this name has metamorphosed into Magurn, Magurren, McGuran, McGurran, McGurn and McGurrin.

== See also ==
- McGovern
