= Ualgarg Mór Ó Ruairc =

King of West Breifne
- Reign: 1316-1346
- Predecessor: Domnall carrach Ó Ruairc
- Successor: Flaithbheartach Ó Ruairc
- Born: ? West Breifne, Ireland
- Died: 1346; County Sligo, Ireland
- Issue: Tadhg; Tigernan; Aedh; Domhnall; Giolla crist Amhlaibh; Ruaidri; Muircertach Slebin; Fergal
- House: O'Rourkes
- Father: Domnall carrach Ó Ruairc

Ualgarg Mór Ó Ruairc (died 1346) was King of West Breifne from 1316 until his death in 1346. His long and influential reign ensured that his descendants would rule West Breifne for the rest of its history, 250 years after his death. The rival branches of the O'Rourke sept which emerged in the 15th century – the Carrigallen O'Rourkes, Dromahair O'Rourkes and Carha O'Rourkes – all trace the lineage back to Ualgarg Mór.

== Family ==
Ualgarg was the son of Domhnall O’Rourke, Lord of Breifne O'Rourke from 1307 to 1311, and brother to Flaithbheartach O’Rourke, King of Breifne O’Rourke from 1346 to 1349 (deposed 1349, died 1352) and to Cathal 'na-taisech' O'Rourke (d.1329) who was foster-son of Matha Mág Tighearnán, chief of the McKiernan Clan of Tullyhunco, County Cavan.
