= McKenney (surname) =

McKenney or McKenny is a surname. Notable people with the surname include:

- Charles McKenny, president of Central State Normal School (now Central Michigan University), Milwaukee
- Devon McKenney, American soccer player
- Don McKenney, Canadian ice hockey player
- Eileen McKenney, sister of author Ruth McKenney
- Henry William McKenney, Canadian politician
- James Felix McKenney, American writer, director, producer and actor
- Jim McKenny, former ice hockey defenceman and reporter
- Joe McKenney, Boston College footballer
- Marjorie McKenney, American military machinist
- Ruth McKenney, American author
- Stewart McKenny, Australian comic book artist
- Thomas L. McKenney, U.S. Superintendent of Indian Trade
- Thomas McKenny Hughes, Welsh geologist
- Todd McKenney, Australian entertainer
- Todd McKenney (Ohio politician)
- William Robertson McKenney, U.S. Representative from Virginia
