= McGovern (name) =

Irish surname

McGovern Irish name: Mag Shamhráin
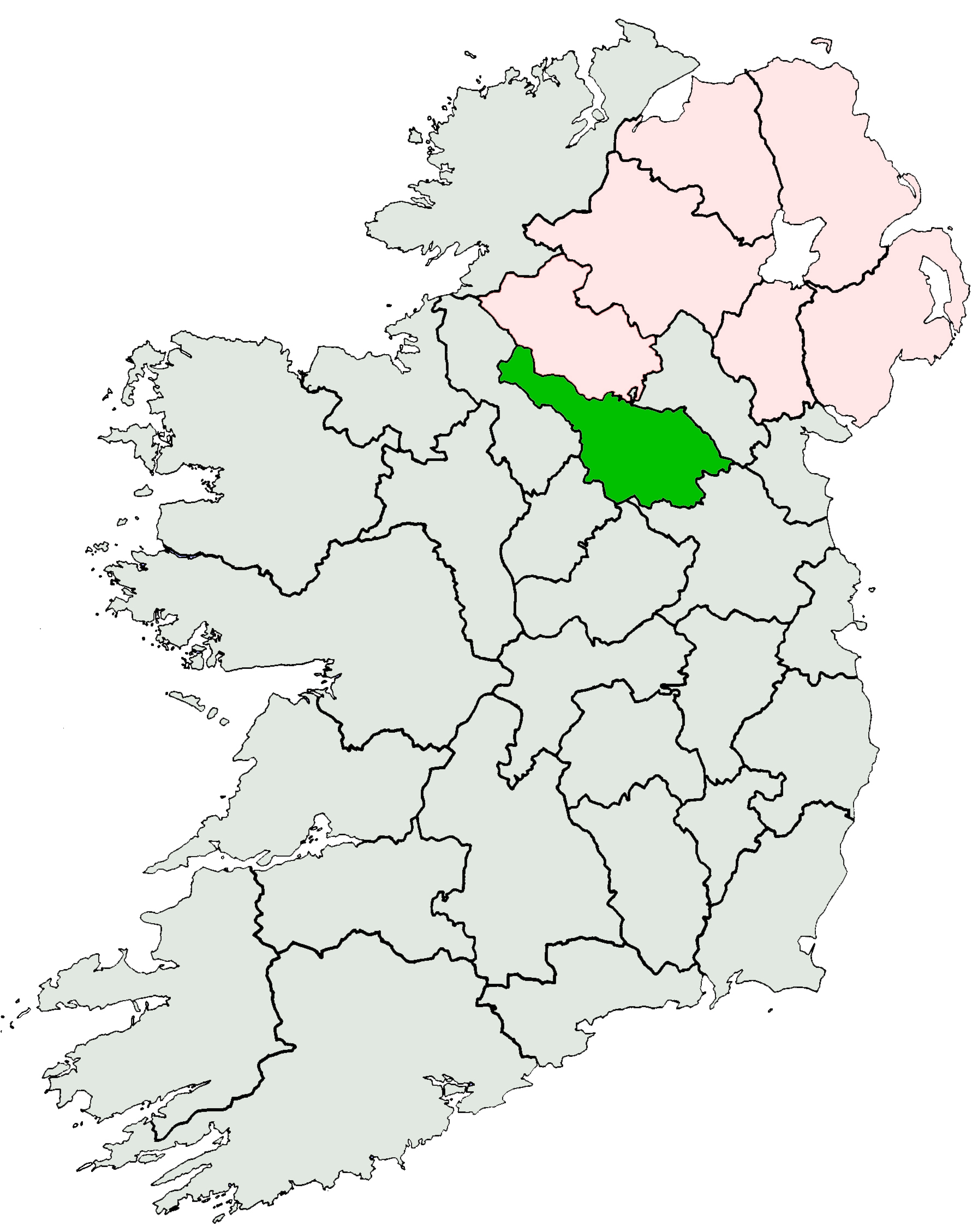
- Earlier spellings: MacGauran, MacGoveran, MacGowran, Magauran, MacGavern, Magavern, McGavern; Anglicised Somers, Summers
- Etymology: "A summery personality"
- Origin: County Cavan, Ireland
- Members: Samhradhán lived c. 1100 AD
- Connected families: McKiernan

The surname McGovern (Irish: Mág Samhradháin), is of Irish origin and is found predominantly in the counties of Cavan (among the fifteen most common names), Fermanagh and Leitrim.

The Irish name is Mag Samhradháin, meaning the Son of Samhradhán, and the clan or sept takes its name from one Samhradhán who lived c. 1100 AD descended from 7th-century Eochaidh, a descendant of Brión mac Echach Muigmedóin. Eochaidh gave his name to Teallach Eochaid, modern day Tullyhaw in Cavan. This was long the territory of the McGoverns. Their strongholds were at Ballymagauran, Bawnboy, Coologe and Lissanover in Cavan.

There are many variations found in the spelling of the name, all of which are attempts at a phonetic spelling of the Gaelic Mag Samhradháin. The Mag part can be found as Mag, Meg, Mac, Mau, Mec, Mc, Ma or M'. The Samhradháin part (which may be attached to or detached from the Mag part and all its variations) can be found (the G being capitalised or not) as Samradhan, Shamhradhan, Shamhraghan, Shamradhan, Goveran, Govern, Govran, Gawran, Gawrain, Gawrene, Gawryne, Gauran, Gaurin, Gaurn, Gaurien, Gaurayn, Gaveran, Gaheran, Gahran, Gowran, Gouran, Gurn, Gurren, Guran, Guarayn.

== Chiefs of the Clan ==
The following is a provisional list of the chiefs of the McGovern Clan, Barons or Lords of Tullyhaw.

- c.653-686 Eochaidh, son of Maonach (After whom is named Teallach n-Eachach or Tullyhaw)
- c.686-719 Oireachtach, son of Eochaidh
- c.719-752 Dúnghal, son of Oireachtach
- c.752-785 Cosgrach, son of Dúnghal (perhaps the Coscrach, son of Donn whose death is mentioned in AFM 794)
- c.818-851 Íomhaor, son of Cosgrach
- c.851-884 Ruarc, son of Íomhaor (lived at Dunmakeever, Glangevlin, County Cavan)
- c.884-917 Tadhg Tir, son of Ruarc
- c.917-950 Conchobhar, son of Tadhg Tir
- c.950-983 Aonghus, son of Conchobhar
- c.983-1016 Flann, son of Aonghus
- c.1016-1049 Fearghal, son of Flann
- c.1049-1082 Conchobhar, son of Fearghal
- c.1082-1115 Samhradhán, son of Conchobhar (lived at Moneensauran, Glangevlin, County Cavan)
- c.1115-1148 Muireadhach Mág Samhradhán (i.e. the first chief to bear the name Mág Samhradháin or McGovern)
- c.1148-1181 Giolla na Naomh Mág Samhradháin, the First, son of Muireadhach
- c.1181-1231 Giolla Íosa Mág Samhradháin (died 1231), son of Giolla na Naomh (the First)
- 1231-c.1240 Giolla na Naomh Mág Samhradháin (the Second), son of Giolla Íosa
- c.1240-1258 Brian Mág Samhradháin, the First, (died 1258)
- c.1258-1269 Donnchadh ‘Cime’ Mág Samhradháin (died 1269), son of Giolla na Naomh (the Second)
- 1269-1272 Tomás Mág Samhradháin, the First (died 1272), son of Aedh Mág Samhradháin and half-brother or step-brother of Donnchadh
- 1272-1294 Brian ‘Breaghach’ Mág Samhradháin, the Second, (died 3 May 1294), son of Donnchadh, lived at Coologe, County Cavan
- 1294-1299 Maghnus Mág Samhradháin, the First (died 1299), son of Donnchadh and brother of Brian ‘Breaghach’
- -1325-1340 Tomás Mág Samhradháin the Second (died 1340), son of Brian ‘Breaghach’
- 1340-1359 Niall Mág Samhradháin (died 1359), son of Tomás the Second
- 1359-1393 Fearghal Mág Samhradháin (died 1393), son of Tomás the Second and brother of Niall
- 1393-1408 Maghnus 'Ruadh' Mág Samhradháin, the Second, (died 1408), son of Tomás the Second and brother of Niall
- 1408-1458 Tomás Óg 'na Fésóige' Mág Samhradháin, the Third (died 1458), son of Fearghal
- 1458-1460 Eóghan Mág Samhradháin (died 1460) son of Tomás Óg & grandson of Fearghal
- 1460-1478 Cathal Mág Samhradháin, the First (died 1478) grandson of Fearghal
- 1478-15 Feb 1495 Feidhlimidh Mág Samhradháin, the First (died 1495), son of Tomás Óg & grandson of Fearghal
- Feb 1495-15 Feb 1496 Domhnall ‘Bernach’ Mág Samhradháin (died 1496), son of Tomás Óg & half-brother of Feidlim
- Feb 1496-1504 Éamonn Mág Samhradháin (died 1504), grandson of Tomás Óg and nephew of Domhnall ‘Bernach’.
- 1504-1512 Cathal Mág Samhradháin, the Second, (died 1512), nephew of Éamonn
- 1512-1532 Tomás Mág Samhradháin, the Fourth (died 1532), son of Maghnus and grandson of Tomás Óg
- 1540- Uaithne Mág Samhradháin, son of Maghnus and grandson of Tomás Óg
- 15??-1584 Brian Óg Mág Samhradháin, the Third, son of Brian, d. 1584,
- 1584-1586- Tomas Óg Mág Samhradháin (pardoned 19/1/1586)
- -1609-1622 Feidhlimidh Mág Samhradháin, the Second, (died 20 January 1622)
- 1622- Brian Magauran, the Fourth, son of Feidhlimidh
- -1641-1657- Charles Magauran, the Third, son of Brian Magauran
- -1690- Colonel Bryan Magauran, the Sixth, grandson of Charles Magauran

== Pedigree of McGovern Chiefs ==
Samhradhán

¦

Muireadhach

¦

Giolla na Naomh

¦

Giolla Iosa (d. 1231)

¦

Giolla na Naomh (fl. 1255)

¦

Donnchadh Cime (d. 1272) = May Mor O’Rourke

¦

Brian Breaghach (d. 1298) = Maoilmheadha Mac Kiernan (d. 1323)

¦

Tomas (d. 1343) = Nualaidh Maguire

¦

Fearghal (d. 1393)

¦

Tomas na Feasoige (d. 1458)

¦

Tomas Og (d. 1494)

¦

Maghnus (d. 1497)

¦

Tomas (d. 1532)

¦

Brian

¦

Feidhlimidh (d. 20 Jan 1622)

¦

Brian (b. 1592, fl. 1626)

¦

Cathal (fl. 1655)
