= Maghnus Mág Samhradháin =

Maghnus Mág Samhradháin, the First, (anglicised Manus McGovern) was chief of the McGovern Clan and Baron or Lord of Tullyhaw barony, County Cavan from 1294 until his murder in 1299.

== Ancestry ==
His ancestry was Maghnus mac Donnchadh ‘Cime’ Mág Samhradháin (d. 1269) mac Giolla na Naomh Mág Samhradháin (the Second) (d. 1255) mac Giolla Íosa Mág Samhradháin (d. 1231) mac Giolla na Naomh Mág Samhradháin, the First (fl. 1170) mac Muireadhach Mág Samhradhán (fl. 1130) mac Samhradhán (fl. 1100), who were all previous chiefs of the clan. His mother was May Mór O’Ruairc, the daughter of Amlaíb O'Ruairc, king of West Breifne from 1257–1258. His brothers included Brian ‘Breaghach’ Mág Samhradháin (whom he succeeded as chieftain) and Macraith Mág Samhradháin, the ancestor of two McGovern bishops (Cormac Mác Shamhradháin of Ardagh and Cormac Mág Shamhradháin of Kilmore).

== Chieftainship ==
On the death of his brother Brian ‘Breaghach’ Mág Samhradháin on 3 May 1294, Maghnus took the chieftaincy and moved to Coologe castle. He must have been involved in a conflict five years later as he was killed in 1299.

== The Book of Magauran ==
The castle of Maghnus at Coologe was one of the stops on the medieval Irish poetic circuit. It attracted poets from all over Ireland and even as far away as Scotland. A poet would leave his own house, where he often ran a poet's school, and set off on circuit. When arriving at a lord's castle he would be given free food and board in exchange for entertaining the lord and his guests. If the lord agreed, then the poet would compose a praise poem in the chief's honour which would then be recited in front of the assembled guests and afterwards transcribed into the chief's family poem book or Duanaire, along with the poems of previous poets. In return the chief would pay the poet with cattle or a horse or gold. The poet would then leave and visit another lord's castle on the circuit, eventually returning to his own home laden with gifts. The McGovern Duanaire or Book of Magauran is the oldest such Duanaire still surviving. The earliest poem in the book was composed in honour of Brian ‘Breaghach’ Mág Samhradháin c.1290 and the latest poem is in honour of Niall Mág Samhradháin, the son of Tomás, composed about 1362. Poem number 11 in the book is dedicated to Maghnus. It was composed by Raghnall Ó'hUiginn (d.1325) from the noted poetic O'Higgins family.

== Personal appearance ==
According to poem number 11 in the Book of Magauran, Maghnus had hyacinth-blue eyes. He wore a purple cloak and a gold ring on his finger. He bought his wine from a wine merchant who sailed up to Lough MacNean at the northern extremity of the territory of Maghnus. He drank the wine from a gold cup decorated with filigree-work. He suffered from many wounds which he had received in battles. When fighting he wore a long sword carried in a dark leather sheath. He also fought with axes and with spears made of ash-wood and tipped with blued-steed points. There were satin tapestries in his castle which were decorated with golden-tailed birds. His favourite poem was Eire Ard Inis na Riogh by Giolla Coemhain. Maghnus liked to go to sleep to the sound of music from brass-stringed harps and lyres. He loved his pack of hounds.

== Death ==
Maghnus was killed in 1299 but some annals give a later date.

The Annals of Ulster for the year 1299 state-

Maghnus Mag Shamhradhain, chief of TellachEathach, died.

The Annals of the Four Masters under the year 1303 state-

Manus Magauran, Chief of Teallach Eachdhach Tullyhaw, in the county of Cavan died.

The Annals of Loch Cé under the year 1303 state-

Maghnus Mac Shamhradhain, dux of Tellach-Echach, occisus est.

The Annals of Connacht for 1303 state-

Magnus Mag Samradain, chieftain of Tullyhaw, was killed.

== Family ==
Maghnus was married to Órlaith, the granddaughter of Muireadhach of the Máigh, but there is no mention of any children in the genealogies.

Preceded by Brian ‘Breaghach’ Mág Samhradháin	Chief of McGovern clan -1294–1299 AD	Succeeded by Tomás Mág Samhradháin the Second
