= Niall Mág Samhradháin =

Irish clan chief and baron, died 1359

Niall Mag Samhradháin, (anglicised Niall McGovern) was chief of the McGovern Clan and either the Baron or the Lord of Tullyhaw barony, County Cavan in modern day Ireland from 1340 until his death in 1359.

== Ancestry ==
His ancestry was Niall son of Tomás Mág Samhradháin (died 1340) (d. 1340) son of Brian ‘Breaghach’ Mág Samhradháin (d. 1294) mac Donnchadh ‘Cime’ Mág Samhradháin (d. 1269) mac Giolla na Naomh Mág Samhradháin (the Second) (d. 1255) mac Giolla Íosa Mág Samhradháin (d. 1231) mac Giolla na Naomh Mág Samhradháin, the First, (fl.1170) mac Muireadhach Mág Samhradhán (fl.1130) mac Samhradhán (fl.1100), who were all previous chiefs of the clan. His mother was Nualaidh, the daughter of the Maguire chief and Maguire's wife Éadaoin Ó Ceallaigh. His brothers were Tighearnán, Brian (d. 1337), Aedh (d. 1351), Seán, Conchobhar, Fearghal Mág Samhradháin who also became chief and died in 1393, Maghnus Ruadh Mág Samhradháin who also became chief and died in 1408, Giolla na Naomh, Tadhg Buidhe (d. 1367), Maghnus Buidhe (d. 1357) and Matha (d. 1356).

== Chieftainship ==
On the death of the previous chief in 1340, his father Tomás Mág Samhradháin (died 1340), Niall succeeded and reigned as chief until his death in 1359.

In 1351 his uncle Sitriug died and Niall's brother Aedh was killed when fighting the O’Falain clan.

The Annals of Ulster for 1351 state-

Sitric Mag Samradhain died. Aedh Mag Samradhain died of his injuries on being wounded by Ua Falain.

The Annals of the Four Masters for 1354 state-

Sitric Magauran died.

The Annals of Loch Cé for 1354 state-

Sitric Mac Samhradhain mortuus est. Mac Murchadha was torn asunder by Foreigners, through which a great war occurred between Foreigners and Gaeidhel. Aedh Mac Samhradhain died of his wounds.

The Annals of Connacht for 1354 state-

Sitriucc Mag Samradain died. Aed Mac Samradain died of his wounds.

In 1354 another of Niall's brothers, Maghnus Buidhe, was killed when fighting the O’Neill clan.

The Annals of Ulster for 1354 state-

Maghnus Mag Samradhain the Tawny was killed in the Route of Mac Uidhilin by Aedh Ua Neill.

The Annals of the Four Masters for 1357 state-

Brian, son of Gilchreest O'Rourke, and Manus Boy Magauran, were slain in the Route, Mac Quillin's territory, by Hugh O'Neill.

The Annals of Loch Cé for 1357 state-

Brian, son of Gilla-Christ O'Ruairc, and Maghnus Buidhe Mac Samhradhain, were killed in Ruta-Mic-Ugilin, by Aedh O'Neill, in hoc anno.

The Annals of Connacht for 1357 state-

Brian son of Gilla Crist O Ruairc and Magnus Buide Mag Samradain were killed by Aed O Neill in the Route this year.

In 1356 yet another of his brothers, Matha, was killed when fighting the O’Connor clan.

The Annals of Ulster for 1356 state-

A great defeat (the defeat of Ath-seanaigh) was inflicted by Cathal junior, son of Cathal Ua Concobhuir, near Ath-senaigh on the Conailli (namely, on John, son of Concobar Ua Domnaill) and John Ua Dochartaigh, chief of Ard-Midhair and Eogan the Connacian and Toirdelbach Mac Suibhne were taken prisoners by the son of Ua Concobuir. Matthew Mag Samradhain, who was to be chief of Tellach-Eachach, was mortally injured that day and died at his own house. The kingship of Tir-Connaill was taken by the son of Ua Concobuir.

The Annals of the Four Masters for 1359 state-

A great victory was gained at Ballyshannon by Cathal Oge, the son of Cathal O'Conor, over John, the son of Conor O'Donnell, and the Kinel-Connell. John O'Doherty, Chief of Ardmire, Owen Connaghtagh, and Turlough Mac Sweeny, were taken prisoners on this occasion by the son of O'Conor, and many persons were slain by him. Matthew Magauran, materies of a lord of Teallach Eachdhach was wounded on that day, and died of his wounds after his return to his own house. During the same war Cathal Bodhar, the son of Cathal O'Rourke, and Melaghlin O'Gormly, fell by each other's hand in the same war. This occurred when Cathal O'Conor marched with a second army into Tirconnell, and a party of his people arrived in O'Gormly's territory under the command of Cathal Bodhar O'Rourke.

The Annals of Loch Cé for 1359 state-

A great defeat was given by Cathal Og O'Conchobhair to the Cenel-Conaill, near Bel-Atha-Senaigh, and John O'Dochartaigh, chieftain of Ard-Midhair, and Eoghan Connachtach, and Toirdhelbhach Mac Suibhne, were moreover taken prisoners there; and a great slaughter was committed there. Matthew Mac Samhradhain, heir to the chieftaincy of Tellach-Echach, was wounded that day, and died at home of that wound.

The Annals of Connacht for 1359 state-

Cathal Oc O Conchobair inflicted a severe defeat, on the Cenel Conaill at Ballyshannon, where Seoan O Dochurtaig, chieftain of Ardmire, and Eogan Connachtach and Toirrdelbach Mac Suibne were captured and great slaughter was made. Matha Mag Samradain, a possible chieftain of Tullyhaw, was wounded that day and died at home of the wound.

The Annals of Clonmacnoise for 1359 state-

Cahall oge O'Connor gaue an overthrow to the Inhabitants of Tyreconell at Belaseannye, where John O'Dochorty, chieftaine of Ardmire and Terlaugh m'Swynie were taken, and a great many of others slaine besides. Mathew MaGawran, next successor of Teallaghaagh, was hurt in the same place, from thence was convayed to his house and died of the wound.

== The Book of Magauran ==
The castle of Niall at Coologe was one of the stops on the medieval Irish poetic circuit. It attracted poets from all over Ireland and even as far away as Scotland. A poet would leave his own house, where he often ran a poet's school, and set off on circuit. When arriving at a lord's castle he would be given free food and board in exchange for entertaining the lord and his guests. If the lord agreed, then the poet would compose a praise poem in the chief's honour which would then be recited in front of the assembled guests and afterwards transcribed into the chief's family poem book or Duanaire, along with the poems of previous poets. In return the chief would pay the poet with cattle or a horse or gold. The poet would then leave and visit another lord's castle on the circuit, eventually returning to his own home laden with gifts. The McGovern Duanaire or Book of Magauran is the oldest such Duanaire still surviving. The earliest poem in the book was composed in honour of Brian ‘Breaghach’ Mág Samhradháin c.1290 and the latest poem is in honour of Niall, composed about 1362. Poems 14, 15, 17, 30, 32 & 33 are dedicated to Niall and poems 13 & 16 to his wife Sadhbh. They were composed by the following poets who visited the castle during his reign- Mac Taidhg mac Raith (poem 13); two members of the Ó’Clúmháin family from County Sligo- Caoch Ceise Ó’Clúmhán (poem 17) and Giolla Aonghuis Ó’Clúmhán (poem 15); Tadhg Ó’Domhnalláin (poem 33) and three poets from the noted poetic O'Higgins family, Mathghamhain Ó'hUiginn (poem 32), Niall Ó'hUiginn (d. 1340, poem 16, composed before 1341 when Sadhbh was married to Flaithbheartach mac Domnall Carrach O’Rourke), Tadhg Ó'hUiginn (poem 30) and Uilliam Ó'hUiginn (d. 1378, poem 14).

== Personal appearance ==
According to the Book of Magauran, Niall was handsome, with curly hair, dark eyebrows, blue-grey eyes, red lips and white teeth. He had small feet and wore bright ornamented shoes and a green cotton tunic. He had a sweet, pleasant voice. In battle he wore a steel helmet. He was fond of horses and was a strong swimmer. His wife Sadhbh had blue eyes, black eyebrows and curly long blond hair which was braided and reached to her feet. Her hair was built up into a powdered coiffure. When her hair was being washed she wore a red robe and was attended by a line of kneeling maids. She did embroidery on satin and depicted lions, dragons, horses, birds and herds of oxen fleeing from a golden wolf. She worked her husband's name into the tapestry and also engraved it on the stem of his wine goblets, which had fine carvings and thin stems. She liked boating, swimming and riding horses. She wore an ornamented girdle on her waist with four buckles. She also wore coloured satin garments containing twisted golden thread and a scarlet cloak.

== Death ==
Niall died in 1359 but some annals give a later date.

The Annals of Ulster for 1359 state-

Niall Mag Samradhain, chief of Tellach-Eathach, died.

The Annals of the Four Masters under the year 1362 state-

Niall Magauran, Chief of Teallach Eachdhach, died.

The Annals of Connacht 1362 state-

Niall Mag Samradain, chieftain of Tullyhaw, rested.

The Annals of Loch Cé for 1362 state-

Niall Mac Samhradhain, dux of Tellach-Echach, quievit.

== Family ==
Niall married Sadhbh (d. 1373), the daughter of Cathal mac Domhnall Ó Conchobair (d. 1324), King of Connacht from 1318 to 1324, and his wife Ailbhe. She had previously been married (from before 1340 until 1352) to Flaithbheartach mac Domnall Carrach O’Rourke, King of Breifne O’Rourke from 1346 to 1349 (deposed 1349, died 1352) who was the brother of Ualgarg Mór Ó Ruairc also king of Breifne from 1316 to 1346. Niall's sons were Tighearnán Mór, Ruadhrí, Eóghan and CúChonnacht. Flaithbheartach O'Rourke's sons, some or all by Sadhbh and therefore Niall's step-sons, were Maelsechlainn (d. 1401), Domhnall, CúChonnacht, Fergal, Tighernán na Lurgan, Art and Concobhar. The Annals of the Four Masters for 1400 mentions their fate-

The sons of Flaherty O'Rourke were banished from Breifny; and they went to Tirconnell, and brought some of the Kinel-Connell with them into Breifny, where they committed great depredations on O'Rourke, and carried away the spoils into Tirconnell.

The Annals of the Four Masters for 1401 state-

A war afterwards broke out between O'Donnell and Brian, the son of Henry O'Neill; for Brian had led an army into Tirconnell, and had attacked the fortress of O'Donnell, and killed the son of Niall Oge, son of Niall Garv, son of Hugh, son of Donnell Oge O'Donnell, and Melaghlin, son of Flaherty O'Rourke, and many others.

Preceded by Tomás Mág Samhradháin (died 1340)	Chief of McGovern clan 1340–1359 AD	Succeeded by Fearghal Mág Samhradháin
