= Fearghal Mág Samhradháin =

Fearghal Mág Samhradháin, (anglicised Fergal McGovern) was chief of the McGovern Clan and Baron or Lord of Tullyhaw barony, County Cavan from 1359 until his death in 1393.

== Ancestry ==
His ancestry was Fearghal son of Tomás Mág Samhradháin the Second (d. 1340) son of Brian ‘Breaghach’ Mág Samhradháin (d.1294) mac Donnchadh ‘Cime’ Mág Samhradháin (d.1269) mac Giolla na Naomh Mág Samhradháin (the Second) (d.1255) mac Giolla Íosa Mág Samhradháin (d.1231) mac Giolla na Naomh Mág Samhradháin, the First (fl.1170) mac Muireadhach Mág Samhradhán (fl.1130) mac Samhradhán (fl.1100), who were all previous chiefs of the clan. His mother was Nualaidh, the daughter of the Maguire chief and Maguire’s wife Éadaoin Ó’Ceallaigh. His brothers were Tighearnán, Brian (d. 1337), Aedh (d.1351), Séan, Conchobhar, Niall Mág Samhradháin who preceded him as chief and died in 1359, Maghnus 'Ruadh' Mág Samhradháin who succeeded him as chief and died in 1408, Giolla na Naomh, Tadhg Buidhe (d.1367), Maghnus Buidhe (d.1357) and Matha (d.1356).

== Chieftainship ==
On the death of the previous chief in 1359, his brother Niall Mág Samhradháin, Fearghal succeeded and reigned as chief until his death in 1393. Although he is not mentioned in the Book of Magauran, he had a reputation as a great patron of poets.

In 1367 his brother Tadhg Buidhe and another relative, Aengus, died. Aengus was probably Fearghal’s second cousin, once removed, the son of Conchobhar, son of Donnchadh, son of Brian ‘Breaghach’ Mág Samhradháin. If so then Conchobhar must have been a member of the clergy as he is referred to as a deacon and therefore is one of the earliest known clergy in the McGovern clan.

The Annals of the Four Masters for 1367 state-

Teige Magauran and Aengus, son of the Deacon Magauran, died.

The Annals of Connacht for 1367 state-

Aengus son of the Dean Mag Samradain rested. Tadc Mag Samradain died.

The Annals of Loch Cé for 1367 state-

Aenghus, son of the Dean Mac Samhradhain, quievit. Tadhg Mac Samhradhain mortuus est.

In 1372 the poet Seán Mór Ó Dubhagáin wrote a poem about the tribes of Ireland- Triallam timcheall na Fodla. The McGoverns are mentioned as follows-

Mac Samhradhain, knot of every strength,

Over the illustrious Teallach Eachdhach;

His land is not rendered ugly by the wind.

In 1383 Fearghal’s son Maol Sheachlann, who was Tánaiste of the clan, died.

The Annals of the Four Masters for 1383 state-

Melaghlin Magauran, Tanist of Teallach Eachdhach Tullyhaw, died.

== Death ==
Fearghal died in April (after the 7th) 1393.

The Annals of Ulster for 1393 state-

Ferghal Mag Samradhain, namely, chief of Tellach-Eathach, to wit, a general patron to the learned retinues and companies of Ireland, died between Easter and May-Day this year. And troubled and saddened are the learned companies by that death.

The Annals of the Four Masters under the year 1393 state-

Farrell Magauran, Chief of Teallach Eachdhach, a man of lavish hospitality towards the literati.

The Annals of Connacht 1393 state-

Fergal Mag Samradain, chieftain of Tullyhaw, a man who was lauded jointly by the poets and satirists of Ireland, [died] between Easter and Mayday.

The Annals of Loch Cé for 1393 state-

Ferghal Mac Samhradhain, dux of Tellach-Echach, (and a man who was equally praised by the poets and satirists of Erinn), died between Easter and May-day.

== Family ==
Fearghal’s sons were Maol Sheachlann (who was Tánaiste of the clan and died in 1383), Brian (died 1427), Donnchadh Ballach (d. 1445) and Cormac.

Preceded by Niall Mág Samhradháin	Chief of McGovern clan 1359–1393 AD	Succeeded by Maghnus 'Ruadh' Mág Samhradháin
