= Tomás Mág Samhradháin (died 1340) =

Clan chief in Ireland

Tomás mac Brian Breaghach Mág Samhradháin, (anglicised Thomas McGovern) was chief of the McGovern Clan and Baron or Lord of Tullyhaw barony, County Cavan from before 1325 until his death in 1340.

== Ancestry ==
His ancestry was Tomás son of Brian ‘Breaghach’ Mág Samhradháin (d.1294) mac Donnchadh ‘Cime’ Mág Samhradháin (d.1269) mac Giolla na Naomh Mág Samhradháin (the Second) (d.1255) mac Giolla Íosa Mág Samhradháin (d.1231) mac Giolla na Naomh Mág Samhradháin, the First, (fl.1170) mac Muireadhach Mág Samhradhán (fl.1130) mac Samhradhán (fl.1100), who were all previous chiefs of the clan. His mother was Maoilmheadha Mág Tighearnán, the daughter of Gíolla Íosa Mór Mág Tighearnán, chief of the McKiernan Clan of Tullyhunco, County Cavan from c.1269 until his death in 1279. His brothers were Domhnall, Tighearnan, Matha, Donnchadh and Sitriug (d.1351). His half-brothers and sister were Giolla Íosa (d.1322), Ferghal Ruadh (d.1322) and Gormlaidh who married Matha O’Reilly (d.1304).

== Head of the Lineage ==
On the death of the previous ceann fine, sometime before 1325, Tomás succeeded and reigned until his death in 1340.

In 1327 his nephew Rory, son of Sitriug, was killed during the Battle of Fiodh-an-Átha, a raid on the English village of Finnea, County Westmeath led by the first cousin of Tomás, Ualgarg Mór Ó Ruairc (died 1346) who was King of West Breifne from 1316 until his death in 1346.

The Annals of Ulster for 1327 state-

A hosting by Ualgharc O'Ruairc, king of Breifni, to Fidh-in-atha. The Foreigners of the town arose against them, so that Art O'Ruairc, material of a king of Breifni and many others were killed there.

The Annals of the Four Masters for 1330 state-

An army was led by Ualgarg O'Rourke to Fiodh-an-atha, whereupon the English of that town rose up against him. O'Rourke's people were defeated; and Art O'Rourke, a materies of a chief lord of Breifny, Rory Magauran, and many others, were slain by the English.

The Annals of Loch Cé for 1330 state-

A hosting by O'Ruairc to Fidh-an-atha, when the people of the town opposed them, and O'Ruairc was defeated, and Art O'Ruairc, who was qualified to be king of Breifne, was killed there, and a great many more, both good and bad.

The Annals of Connacht for 1330 state-

O Ruairc went on a hosting to Finnae. The people of the town rose against him and defeated him and Art O Ruairc, an eligible prince of Brefne, was killed, with many others, gentle and simple.

John Pembridge's Annals for 1331 state-

Item, apud Ffynnagh in Midia, strages Hibernicorum per Anglicos ejusdem terre undecimo die mensis Junii.

Grace's Annals for 1331 state-

at Finnagh, in Meath, some are killed by the English inhabitants on the 19th of June

Tomás and two of his sons were captured in 1335 by the McKiernans, the Clan Muircheartaigh Uí Conchobhair and others but some annals give it as 1338.

The Annals of Ulster for 1335 state-

Tadhg, son of Ruaidhri, son of Cathal Ua Conchobuir, was taken prisoner by Thomas Mag Samhradhain and many of his people were killed. Mag Shamhradhain went to the house of Ua Concobuir the same year and he came back again and on his return an attack was made by the Clann-Muircertaigh and by Muinter-Eoluis and by the muster of the Breifni, both Foreigner and Gallowglass, on him. And Mag Shamhradhain was taken prisoner and many of his people were killed.

The Annals of the Four Masters for 1338 state-

Teige, son of Rory, son of Cathal O'Conor (who was usually called Bratach Righin), was taken prisoner by Thomas Magauran, and many of his people were killed. Magauran (i.e. Thomas) afterwards went to the house of O'Conor; but, on his return, the Clann-Murtough, and the Muintir-Eolais, assembled to meet him, and took him prisoner, after having slain many of his people.

The Annals of Connacht 1338 state-

Tadc son of Ruaidri son of Cathal Ruad O Conchobair, who was called Bratach Righin, was taken prisoner by Tomas Mag Samradain and many of his followers were killed. Afterwards Mag Samradain went to O Conchobair's house, and as he was coming away the Clan Murtagh and the Muinter Eolais assembled to intercept him, captured him and killed many of his men.

The Annals of Loch Cé under the year 1338 state-

Tadhg, son of Ruaidhri, son of Cathal Ruadh O'Conchobhair, usually called the 'Bratach righin', was taken prisoner by Thomas Mac Samhradhain; and many of his people were slain. Mac Samhradhain went afterwards to O'Conchobhair's house, and on his return from O'Conchobhair's house the Clann-Muirchertaigh and Muinter-Eolais assembled before him; and Mac Samhradhain was taken prisoner by them, and several of his people were slain.

Tomás was released from captivity a year later.

The Annals of Ulster for 1336 state-

Thomas Mag Samradhain, who was in custody with the Clann-Muircertaigh, was set free in that year, after the daughter of Donnchadh the Swarthy was renounced him and his two sons escaped that year likewise.

The Annals of the Four Masters for 1339 state-

Thomas Magauran was liberated by the Clann-Murtough.

The Annals of Connacht 1339 state-

Tomas Mag Samradain, who had been held in captivity by the Clan Murtagh, was let out.

The Annals of Loch Cé for 1339 state-

Thomas Mac Samhradhain, who was detained a prisoner by the Clann-Muirchertaigh, was set at liberty.

The capture of Thomas and his release are preserved in Glangevlin folklore, which states- "A story six centuries old is told by Thomas McGovern, a chief of Tullyhaw. It is said that he made a prisoner of the great Teighe O Connor of Connaught better known as Bratach Fighinn (of the firm standard). The ambitious McGovern refused to liberate the chieftain until he received from him a documentary agreement for the hand of his daughter in marriage together with a dowry befitting a king's daughter. In due course the Chieftain of Tullyhaw sallied forth across the 'Grey Ridge County' for his bride, but the winsome Una O'Connor, who was already plighted refused, to marry McGovern. He persisted but the Clan Murtagh O'Connor of Sligo and the Muintir Eolus of Leitrim took McGovern and never dropped him until they landed in his native Derrynananta, Glangevlin and on the way they subjected him to frequent 'possings' in the ditches. This has given rise to the popular saying on threat in the district 'I'll poss you like Tom McGovern'."

The conflict with the McKiernan clan continued in 1337 when Brian the son of Tomás was killed.

The Annals of Ulster for 1337 state-

Brian Mag Samradhain junior was killed by the Tellach-Dunchadha.

The Annals of the Four Masters for 1340 state-

Brian Oge Magauran was slain by the people of Teallach Dunchadha.

The Annals of Connacht 1340 state-

Brian Oc Mag Samradain was killed by the Tellach Dunchada.

The Annals of Loch Cé for 1340 state-

Brian Og Mac Samhradhain was killed by the Tellach-Dunchadha.

There was also conflict in 1337 with the Anglo-Irish Costello family

The Annals of Ulster for 1337 state-

William, son of Gilbert Mac Goisdelb, was killed on a night-foray in the Breifni by the Tellach-Eachach.

The Annals of the Four Masters for 1340 state-

William, the son of Gilbert Mac Costello, was slain in a conflict in Breifny by the people of Teallach-Eachdhach.

The Annals of Connacht 1340 state-

Uilliam Mac Gosdelb, the son of Gilliberd, was killed on an attack in Brefne by the Tellach Echach.

The Annals of Loch Cé for 1340 state-

William Mac Goisdelbh, son of Gilbert, was slain in a conflict in the Breifne, by the Tellach-Echach.

== The Book of Magauran ==
The castle of Tomás at Coologe was one of the stops on the medieval Irish poetic circuit. It attracted poets from all over Ireland and even as far away as Scotland. A poet would leave his own house, where he often ran a poet's school, and set off on circuit. When arriving at a lord's castle he would be given free food and board in exchange for entertaining the lord and his guests. If the lord agreed, then the poet would compose a praise poem in the chief's honour which would then be recited in front of the assembled guests and afterwards transcribed into the chief's family poem book or Duanaire, along with the poems of previous poets. In return the chief would pay the poet with cattle or a horse or gold. The poet would then leave and visit another lord's castle on the circuit, eventually returning to his own home laden with gifts. The McGovern Duanaire or Book of Magauran is the oldest such Duanaire still surviving. The earliest poem in the book was composed in honour of Brian ‘Breaghach’ Mág Samhradháin c.1290 and the latest poem is in honour of Niall Mág Samhradháin, the son of Tomás, composed about 1362. The majority of poems in the book are dedicated to Tomás who was regarded as a generous patron of poets, poems 10, 12, 18 to 27, 29 and 31, mainly praising him for his generosity and all the cattle-raids he led on neighbouring chiefs. They were composed by the following poets who visited the castle during his reign- Maoilinn Óg, Maol Pádraig Mac Naimhin (or Cnáimhín), Aonghus Ó'hEoghusa (d.1350), Maol Seachlainn Ó'hEoghusa, Ádhamh Ó'Fialán and three poets from the noted poetic O'Higgins family, Raghnall Ó'hUiginn (d.1325), Niall Ó'hUiginn (d.1340) and Giolla na Naomh Ó'hUiginn (d.1349). When visiting Tomás the poets slept on couches made of bright woven straw.

== Personal Appearance ==
According to the Book of Magauran, Tomás had long curly blonde hair, which was braided. He had fair skin, dark bushy eyebrows and dark eyelashes. He had blue-green eyes, red lips, white teeth and a smooth clean-shaven ruddy face with a tendency to blush. He wore rings on his fingers. His sword had a gold hilt. He loved playing with his hounds. His wife Nualaidh also had curly blond hair which was braided. She did embroidery. Tomás had an army of 700 horsemen armed with spears made of red shafts of ash-wood having blued-steel points, to which were attached bright satin pennants. They wore thin tunics instead of armour and had long swords strapped to their waists and white shields strapped to their backs. He also had a troop of bowmen. His army consisted of his tribesmen and also of hired mercenaries from all over Ireland. Their war-cry was Cenn Cruaich in honour of their local god Crom Cruach. The castle had three food-cauldrons, one for the chief's own household, one for the army and one for his wife and her ladies.

== Death ==
Tomás died in 1340 (in his bed at Coologe according to the Book of Magauran) but some annals give a later date.

The Annals of Ulster for 1340 state-

Thomas Mag Samradhain, unique choice of the chiefs of Ireland, died.

The Annals of the Four Masters under the year 1343 state-

Thomas Magauran, chief of Teallach Eachdhach Tullyhaw, died.

The Annals of Connacht 1343 state-

Tomas Mag Samradain, chieftain of Tullyhaw, rested.

The Annals of Loch Cé for 1343 state-

Thomas Mac Samhradhain, dux of Tellach-Echach, quievit.

== Family ==
Tomás married Nualaidh, the daughter of the Maguire chief and Maguire's wife Éadaoin Ó’Ceallaigh. Their sons were Tighearnán, Brian (d. 1337), Niall Mág Samhradháin who succeeded Tomás as chief and died in 1359, Aedh (d. 1351), Séan, Conchobhar, Fearghal Mág Samhradháin who also became chief and died in 1393, Maghnus 'Ruadh' Mág Samhradháin who also became chief and died in 1408, Giolla na Naomh, Tadhg Buidhe (d.1367), Maghnus Buidhe (d.1354) and Matha (d.1356).

Preceded by Maghnus Mág Samhradháin	Chief of McGovern clan -1325–1340 AD	Succeeded by Niall Mág Samhradháin
