= Tomás Óg na Fésóige Mág Samhradháin =

Irish clan chieftain (died 1458)

Tomás Óg na Fésóige Mág Samhradháin, the Third, (anglicised Thomas McGovern, Junior 'of the beard') was chief of the Irish McGovern Clan and Baron or Lord of Tullyhaw barony, County Cavan, Ireland, from 1408 until his death in 1458.

== Ancestry ==
His ancestry was Tomás Óg 'na Fésóige' (d. 1458) son of Fearghal Mág Samhradháin (d. 1393) son of Tomás Mág Samhradháin the Second (d. 1343) son of Brian ‘Breaghach’ Mág Samhradháin (d. 1298). His father was chief of the clan. His brothers were Maol Sheachlann (died 1383), Brian (died 1427), Donnchadh Ballach (d. 1445) and Cormac.

== Description ==
His nickname 'na Fésóige' means "of the beard" so he must have had a very substantial beard for it to have been remarked on as it was common at the time for most men to have beards.

== Chieftainship ==
On the death of the McGovern chief, his uncle Maghnus 'Ruadh' Mág Samhradháin in 1408, Tomás took the chieftaincy and moved to the chief’s residence in Ballymagauran.

In 1427 his brother Brian died.

The Annals of the Four Masters for 1427 state-

Brian, son of Farrell Magauran, son of the chieftain of Teallach Eachdhach (Tullyhaw), died.

The Annals of Ulster for 1427 state-

Brian, son of Fergail Mag Samradhain, namely, son of the chief of Tellach-Eathach, eminent in charity and good hospitality, died this year with victory of penance.

His nephews were involved in fighting with the Maguire clan in 1428

The Annals of the Four Masters for 1428 state-

Hugh Oge, the son of Hugh Maguire, was slain by Mac Gillafinnen and the sons of Donough Ballagh Magauran.

The Annals of Ulster for 1428 state-

Aedh Mag Uidhir junior was slain by the sons of Donchadh Mag Samradhain the Freckled in the house of Mac Gilla-Finnein this year.

The Annals of Loch Cé for 1428 state-

Aedh Og Mag Uidhir was slain by the sons of Donnchadh Ballach Magamhrain.

In 1431 there was trouble with the Maguire clan when the son of Tomás, Brian Cáech, was killed and Ballymagauran was burned.

The Annals of the Four Masters for 1431 state-

John, the son of Cuconnaught, son of Philip Maguire, was slain by the people of Teallach Eachdhach (Tullyhaw), after he had, at their own invitation, gone into their country. Brian Caech, the son of Magauran, was the man who committed this act of treachery towards him; but this was of no profit to Brian, for he himself and a number of his people were slain. John was attended by only seven persons, while his opponents were forty; and being overpowered by numbers, he was thus slain. Maguire, i.e. Thomas, proceeded with a great host into Teallach Eachdhach, to take vengeance on the inhabitants for the death of his kinsman. He plundered, spoiled, and ravaged the territory, and slew many of the chiefs of it. He also burned Ballymagauran, and then he returned home in triumph.

The Annals of Ulster for 1431 state-

John son of Cu Connacht, son of Philip Mag Uidhir, was slain by the Tellach-Eathach: to wit, a man of hospitality and prowess and piety and that kept a guest-house for poor and for bardic bands and for pilgrims. And he had gone to them on their invitation into their own country. Brian Blind-eye, son of Mag Samradhain, that betrayed him and Brian himself and a multitude of his people fell the same day by John, in expiation of their evil proceeding. And John was there with but seven and Brian was there with two score, or three score. Mag Uidhir, namely, Thomas, son of Thomas, went with a large host into Tellach-Eathach to avenge his kinsman upon them. The country was therefore successfully harried and burned by him and the town of Mag Samradhain and the donjons of the country likewise were burned by him on that occasion. And many of the magnates of the country were slain by Mag Uidhir on that occasion. Mag Uidhir returned to his house on that expedition after triumph of victory and overthrow and so on.

The Annals of Loch Cé for 1431 state-

John, son of Cuchonnacht, son of Philip Mag Uidhir, was slain by the Tellach-Echach in treachery.

In 1439 his first cousin Mrs More MacManus died.

The Annals of the Four Masters for 1439 state-

More, daughter of Hugh Magauran, and wife of Brian Mac Manus, died.

The Annals of Ulster for 1439 state-

Mor, daughter or Aedh Mag Samradhain, namely, wife of Mac Briain Mic Maghnusa, died on the 4th of the Nones 2 February.

In 1440 his brother Donnchadh Ballach captured one of the O'Rourke clan

The Annals of the Four Masters for 1440 state-

O'Rourke, i.e. Loughlin, the son of Teige, was taken prisoner by the sons of Art O'Rourke, who gave him up to Donough Ballagh Magauran and his sons, who gave him up to the sons of Tiernan O'Rourke. A war afterwards broke out between the sons of Tiernan O'Rourke and the sons of Teige O'Rourke, so that they disturbed the territory by the contests between them.

In 1441 his brother Cormac and his nephews began an internecine feud.

The Annals of the Four Masters for 1441 state-

Cormac Magauran took a great prey from the sons of Donough Ballagh Magauran.

Also in 1441 another relative Aine died

The Annals of Ulster for 1441 state-

Aine, daughter of Edmond Mag Samradhain, died.

In 1445 his brother Donnchadh Ballach died.

The Annals of the Four Masters for 1445 state-

Donough Ballagh Magauran, heir to the chieftainship of Teallach-Eachdhach Tullyhaw, died.

The Annals of Ulster for 1445 state-

Donchadh Mag Samradhain the Freckled died this year: namely, one who was to be chief of Tellach Eathach.

In 1450 his nephews attacked the Maguire clan.

The Annals of the Four Masters for 1450 state-

Teige, the son of Philip, son of Thomas Maguire, was slain by the sons of Cormac Magauran, and interred in the monastery of Lisgool.

The Annals of Ulster for 1450 state-

Tadhg, son of Philip, son of Thomas Mag Uidhir, was slain by the sons of Cormac Mag Samradhain a month before Christmas and buried in Lis-gabail.

In 1455 another conflict with the Maguires erupted, Maol Sheachlainn Dubh the son of Tomás was killed and Ballymagauran was burned again.

The Annals of the Four Masters for 1455 state-

A war broke out between Philip, the son of Thomas Maguire, heir to the lordship of Fermanagh, and Magauran. Philip pitched his camp at Beann-Eachlabhra; and Brian and Tuathal, Philip's sons, went forth with twelve horsemen and thirty-seven infantry, burned Magauran's town, and the greater part of his territory, and killed Melaghlin Duv Magauran and a great number of his people; after which he returned home triumphantly. Folklore about this battle is found in the 1938 Dúchas collection.

The Annals of Ulster for 1455 state-

Great war arose between Philip, son of Thomas Mag Uidhir—namely, one that was to be king of Fir-Manach-and Mag Samradhain. Philip made an encampment at Benn-echlabra. The sons of Philip, namely, Brian and Toirdelbach, went with a small force into Tellach-Eathach. And there were not of force on that march except seven score footmen and twelve horsemen. The town of Mag Samradhain and the whole territory were completely burned by them. The son of Mag Samradhain, namely, Mael-Shechlainn the Black and the son of Eogan Mag Samradhain and many others of his people were slain on that expedition. The sons of Philip went to their house from that expedition with victory of overthrow and rout and so on.

== Death ==
Tomás died in 1458.

The Annals of the Four Masters for 1458 state-

Magauran, Thomas, the son of Farrell, died.

The Annals of Ulster for 1458 state-

Mag Samradhain, namely, Thomas, son of Fergal Mag Samradhain, died this year after spending his whole lifetime in great goodness.

The Annals of Loch Cé for 1457 state-

Mac Samhradhain, i.e. Thomas, died.

== Family ==
Tomás had several consorts who bore him children. Whether he was legally married to all of them is unknown. The earliest seems to have been Barduibí Ó' Imaire who bore him two sons, Brian Cáech (d. 1431) and Tighearnán. His next consort seems to have been the daughter of Corman Mac Tadhg who bore a son Maol Sheachlainn Dubh (d. 1455). Another consort was the daughter of the chief of the McKiernan clan who bore Tomás two sons, Fearghal and Eóghan Mág Samhradháin who later became chief and died in 1460. A later consort was Raghnailt the daughter of Muircheartach O'Conchobhair. Her sons were Feidhlimidh Mág Samhradháin, the First a later chief of the clan who died in 1495, Tomás Óg and Brian. His final consort seems to have been Lasairina the daughter of Éamonn Mac Tomas Ó Fearghail, who bore him Toirdealbhach, Donnchadh (who was Tánaiste of the clan and died in 1486) and Domhnall ‘Bernach’ Mág Samhradháin a later chief of the clan who died in 1496.

Regnal titles
Preceded by Maghnus 'Ruadh' Mág Samhradháin	Chief of McGovern clan 1408–1458 AD	Succeeded by Eóghan Mág Samhradháin
