= Cathal Mág Samhradháin =

Cathal Mág Samhradháin, the First, (anglicised Charles McGovern) was chief of the McGovern Clan and Baron or Lord of Tullyhaw barony, County Cavan from 1460 until his death in 1478.

== Ancestry ==
His ancestry was Cathal son of Donnchadh 'Ballach' (the Freckled) (d. 1445) son of Fearghal (d. 1393) son of Tomás (d. 1343) son of Brian ‘Breaghach’ Mág Samhradháin (d. 1298). His mother was the daughter of Ualter Ó'Imaire. His full brothers were Tadhg, Feidhlimidh, Tomás, Toirdealbhach, Maghnus Garbh, Brian, Uilliam and Aedh. His half-brothers were Uaithne and Niall.

== Career ==
Cathal was involved in fighting with the Maguire clan in 1428

The Annals of the Four Masters for 1428 state-

Hugh Oge, the son of Hugh Maguire, was slain by Mac Gillafinnen and the sons of Donough Ballagh Magauran.

The Annals of Loch Cé for 1428 state-

Aedh Og Mag Uidhir was slain by the sons of Donnchadh Ballach Magamhrain.

The Annals of Ulster for 1428 state-

Aedh Mag Uidhir junior was slain by the sons of Donchadh Mag Samradhain the Freckled in the house of Mac Gilla-Finnein this year.

In 1440 he captured one of the O'Rourke clan

The Annals of the Four Masters for 1440 state-

O'Rourke, i.e. Loughlin, the son of Teige, was taken prisoner by the sons of Art O'Rourke, who gave him up to Donough Ballagh Magauran and his sons, who gave him up to the sons of Tiernan O'Rourke. A war afterwards broke out between the sons of Tiernan O'Rourke and the sons of Teige O'Rourke, so that they disturbed the territory by the contests between them.

In 1441 he was attacked by his uncle Cormac in an internecine feud.

The Annals of the Four Masters for 1441 state-

Cormac Magauran took a great prey from the sons of Donough Ballagh Magauran.

== Chieftainship ==
On the death of the McGovern chief in 1460, his first cousin Eóghan Mág Samhradháin, Cathal took the chieftainship and moved to the McGovern castle in Ballymagauran.

== Death ==
Cathal died in 1478.

The Annals of the Four Masters for 1478 state-

Magauran, i.e. Cathal, the son of Donough Ballagh, died.

The Annals of Connacht for 1478 state-

Mag Samradain, that is Cathal son of Donnchad Ballach, and Bishop Mag Samradain died. (The Bishop Mag Samradain referred to was Cormac Mác Shamhradháin, the Bishop of Ardagh, Cathal's fifth cousin.)

== Family ==
Cathal's wife was the daughter of Tighearnán Óg and his sons were Maoleachlann, Seán, Ruadhrí and Toirdealbhach.

Preceded by Eóghan Mág Samhradháin	Chief of McGovern clan 1460–1478 AD	Succeeded by Feidhlimidh Mág Samhradháin, the First
