= Corneenflynn =

Townland in County Cavan, Ireland

Corneenflynn, an Anglicisation of the Gaelic, either ‘Coirnín Flann’ meaning Flann’s Little Corner, or Coirnín Uí Fhloinn meaning Flynn’s Little Corner, or Cairnin Uí Fhloinn meaning Flynn’s Little Cairn or Cairn-Shaped Hill, is a townland in the civil parish of Templeport, County Cavan, Ireland. It lies in the Roman Catholic parish of Glangevlin and barony of Tullyhaw.

== Etymology ==
Samhradhán was the progenitor of the McGovern clan. In the genealogies his great-grandfather was Flann who lived about 1000 A.D. The townland of Corneenflynn is probably an Anglicisation of ‘Coirnín Flann’ meaning Flann’s Little Corner or 'Cairnin Flann' meaning Flann's Cairn. The earliest surviving spelling is Carneene Flyn, which seems to reinforce the latter meaning. This interpretation is also supported by R.V. Walker.

== Geography ==
Corneenflynn is bounded on the west by Creea townland and on the east by Edenmore and Legnagrow townlands. Its chief geographical features are mountain streams, waterfalls, forestry plantations, gravel pits and spring wells. Corneenflynn is traversed by minor public roads and rural lanes. The townland covers 217 statute acres.

== History ==
The 1652 Commonwealth Survey spells the name as Carneene Flyn and the owner is listed as Captain Gwilliams & others, (This was Captain Thomas Gwyllym, the owner of the Ballyconnell estate.

By 1720 Morley Saunders, was the owner of the townland.

By deed dated 24 December 1720 the aforesaid Morley Saunders leased the townland of Curneeneflin, inter alia, to Thomas Enery of Bawnboy for a term of 41 years.

A deed dated 13 Nov 1738 includes: Curnineflin.

A deed dated 30 April 1740 by Thomas Enery includes: Corninafluin.

The 1790 Cavan Carvaghs list spells the name as Corneflynn.

The Tithe Applotment Books for 1826 list five tithepayers in the townland.

The Ordnance Survey Name Books for 1836 give the following description of the townland- There is a small quantity of lime stone found on the north side of the townland. The soil is of a light gravelly nature. In the 1836 OS map a small part of the townland to the south was separate from the main body but by the 1913 edition this small part had been merged with Creea townland. The 1836 Name Books refers to it as- This is a small arable spot containing 8 chains belonging to the townland of Cornaflin. It is in no way connected with Cornaflin being separated from it by Legnagrow and Cray.

The Corneenflynn Valuation Office Field books are available for July 1839.

Griffith's Valuation of 1857 lists fifteen landholders in the townland.

== Census ==
Year	Population	Males	Females	Total Houses	Uninhabited
1841	92	46	46	15	0
1851	91	45	46	14	0
1861	52	27	25	9	0
1871	39	20	19	7	0
1881	41	23	18	6	0
1891	47	25	22	7	1

In the 1901 census of Ireland, there are six families listed in the townland.

In the 1911 census of Ireland, there are eight families listed in the townland.

== Antiquities ==
1. A stone cashel. The 'Archaeological Inventory of County Cavan' (Site No. 1186) describes it as- Raised circular area (int. diam. 23.4m) enclosed by a largely collapsed stone wall (Wth 1.9m; H 0.3m). Original entrance not recognisable. Projecting out from the wall at NE is a small square drystone-built structure (int. diam. 1.8m) the perimeter of which has been incorporated into the field boundary.
