= Éamonn Mág Samhradháin =

Éamonn Mág Samhradháin (anglicised Eamon McGovern) was chief of the McGovern Clan and Baron or Lord of Tullyhaw barony, County Cavan from 1496 until his death in 1504.

== Ancestry ==
His ancestry was Éamonn son of Eóghan Mág Samhradháin son of Tomás na Fésóige (d. 1458) son of Fearghal (d. 1393) son of Tomás (d. 1343) son of Brian ‘Breaghach’ Mág Samhradháin (d. 1298). His father was chief of the clan and his mother was Nuala, daughter of Lochlann O’Rourke, the King of East Breifne O’Ruairc from 1435 to 1458. Éamonn’s brothers were Cathal, Maghnus, Aodh, Fearghal, Uaithne and Tadhg.

== Career ==
During Éamonn's lifetime he was involved in an internal power struggle within the McGovern clan.

The Annals of the Four Masters for 1494 state-

Turlough, the son of Donough, son of Thomas Magauran, was slain by a cast of a javelin by the sons of Owen, son of Thomas, and Farrell, the son of Thomas, son of Thomas Magauran.

The Annals of Ulster for 1494 state-

Toirdelbach, son of Donchadh, son of Thomas Mag Samradhain, was slain by the sons of Eogan, son of Thomas Mag Samradhain and by Fergal, son of Thomas Mag Samradhain, with shot of arrow about May Day. And Edmond Mac Sitriug (namely, a kern) it was that shot the arrow.

== Chieftainship ==
There was internecine warfare between the McGovern clan and the reigning chief, Domhnall ‘Bernach’ Mág Samhradháin, who was slain on 15 February 1496 by Éamonn’s nephews and others in Templeport Church. As this was on the anniversary of the previous chief’s drowning, Feidhlimidh Mág Samhradháin, the First, it may have been in revenge for that and the killing probably happened during the anniversary mass.

The Annals of Ulster for 1496 state-

Mag Samradhain, namely, Domnall Gapped-tooth, son of Thomas, son of Fergal Mag Samradhain, was slain in treachery by Maghnus, son of Thomas, son of Thomas, son of Fergal Mag Samradhain and by the sons of Aedh, son of Eogan, son of Thomas, son of Fergal and by the sons of Brian of Tellach-Eathach, namely, Tadhg and Philip, that is, sons of Feidhlimidh, son of Brian. In Tempoll-an-puirt that was done, on the feast day of Berach, at the end of a year from the day his other brother and his tribe-head was drowned.

The Annals of Loch Cé for 1496 state-

Mac Samhradhain, i.e. Domhnall Bernach, son of Thomas, son of Ferghal, was killed in treachery.

The Annals of Connacht for 1496 state-

Mac Samradain, that is Domnall Bernach son of Tomas son of Fergal, was treacherously killed.

Éamonn then took the chieftaincy and moved to the chief’s residence in Ballymagauran.

His relatives continued the inter-clan fighting and Éamonn and his brothers were involved.

The Annals of Ulster for 1497 state-

Maghnus, son of Thomas Mag Samradhain, was slain by the descendants of Eogan Mag Samhadhain on the 7th of the Ides of November (7th of November).

On 28 September 1498 Éamonn also had trouble with the neighbouring Maguire clan of Fermanagh and two of his nephews were killed in a Maguire raid on his castle in Ballymagauran.

The Annals of Ulster for 1498 state-

Philip, son of Toirdelbach, son of Philip Mag Uidhir, went on an inroad into Tellach-Eathach (Tullyhaw) and the sons of Edmond Mag Uidhir and the sons of Gilla-Padraig Mag Uidhir went with him thither and the country was traversed by them to Snam-na-neach. And the town of Mag Samradhain (Ballymagauran) was burned by them and they turned back and came not on cattle-spoils or chattels. And the worthies of the country overtook them on that retreat with a very large pursuing party and those nobles turned on the pursuing party and defeated them spiritedly, successfully then and slew three and twenty of the pursuing party in that rout, two sons of Aedh, son of Eogan Mag Samradhain, namely, Tadhg and Maghnus (that is, the cleric). And the other portion of them slain were of the Clann-Imair and of the Clan of Mac-in-taisigh and of the muster of Tellach-Eathach also. And there was slain also by the Fir-Manach in the heat of that rout Flaithbertach, son of Donn, son of Edmond Mag Uidhir. And on the vigil of Michaelmas precisely those deeds were done.

The next year the McGoverns took revenge on the Maguires.

The Annals of the Four Masters for 1499 state-

Manus, the son of Godfrey Oge, son of Godfrey Roe Maguire, was slain by the people of Teallach Eachdhach (Tullyhaw).

The Annals of Ulster for 1499 state-

Maghnus, son of Godfrey junior, son of Godfrey Mag Uidhir the Red, was slain this year by the Tellach Eachach.

In 1502 the McGovern internecine warfare boiled up again.

The Annals of the Four Masters for 1502 state-

Cathal, son of Melaghlin Duv Magauran, was slain by the sons of O'Reilly, at the instigation of the son of Brian Magauran and his sons.

== Death ==
Eamonn died in 1504.

The Annals of Ulster for 1504 state-

Mag Samradhain, namely, Edmond Mag Samradhain, died this year.

The Annals of the Four Masters for 1504 state-

Brian, the son of Maguire (John, the son of Philip), and Magauran (Edmond), died.

Preceded by Domhnall ‘Bernach’ Mág Samhradháin	Chief of McGovern clan 1496–1504 AD	Succeeded by Cathal Mág Samhradháin, the Second
