= Domhnall Bernach Mág Samhradháin =

Chief of McGovern clan

Domhnall Bernach Mág Samhradháin (anglicised Donal 'Gap-Tooth' McGovern) was chief of the McGovern Clan and Baron or Lord of Tullyhaw barony, County Cavan from 1495 until his death on 15 February 1496.

== Ancestry ==
Domhnall Bernach's ancestry was Domhnall son of Tomás Óg 'na Fésóige' Mág Samhradháin (d. 1458) son of Fearghal (d. 1393) son of Tomás (d. 1343) son of Brian 'Breaghach' Mág Samhradháin (d. 1298). His mother was Lasairina, daughter of Éamonn Mac Tomas Ó Fearghail. His father Tomás Óg 'na Fésóige' Mág Samhradháin, the Third, was chief of the clan until his death in 1458. Domhnall's full brothers were Toirdealbhach and Donnchadh (who was Tánaiste of the clan and died in 1486). His half-brothers were Feidhlimidh Mág Samhradháin, the First his predecessor as chief, Tomás Óg, Brian, Maol Sheachlainn Dubh, Brian Caech, Tighearnán, Fearghal and Eóghan Mág Samhradháin also a chief of the clan.

== Career ==
In 1487 Domhnall Bernach was involved in a raid on Muintir Eolais in south County Leitrim but was captured by the McDermott clan.

The Annals of Ulster for 1487 state-

Tighernan Carrach, son of Tighernan, son of Tadhg, son of Tighernan Ua Ruairc, was slain in Muinter-Eoluis by the sons of Ruaidhri Mac Diarmada and by the son of Mac Diarmada the Red. And Feradhach, son of Toirdelbach Mag Uidhir senior, was slain there and Domnall, son of Donn, son of Domnall, son of Art Mag Uidhir, was slain there the same day and Domnall Gapped-tooth Mag Samradhain was taken there also and so on.

The Annals of the Four Masters for 1487 state incorrectly that Domhnall was slain-

Tiernan Carragh, the son of Tiernan, son of Teige, son of Tiernan O'Rourke; Feradhach, the son of John, son of Turlough Maguire; and Donnell, the son of Don, son of Donnell, son of Art Maguire, were slain in the territory of Muintir-Eolais, by the sons of Rory Mac Dermot and the son of Mac Dermot Roe, and Donnell Bearnach Magauran was also slain on that occasion.

Domhnall then tried to overthrow the McGovern chief, his half-brother Feidhlimidh Mág Samhradháin, the First, by enlisting the aid of the Maguire clan in his bid for the chieftainship and Feidhlimidh was captured by them on 2 June 1494 but released a few weeks later on 4 July.

The Annals of Ulster for 1494 state-

Mag Samradhain, namely, Feidhlimidh, son of Thomas Mag Samradhain, was taken by some of the sons of Brian Mag Uidhir, namely, Ruaidhri and Brian junior, and by Philip, son of Toirdelbach Mag Uidhir, and by the sons of Redmond Mag Uidhir, namely, Donchadh and Aedh, at instigation of the brother of Mag Samradhain himself, namely, Donnall Gapped-tooth. And Fergal, son of Fergal, son of Thomas Mag Samradhain, was slain by the descendants of Philip Mag Uidhir. And Mag Samradhain himself, namely, Feidhlimidh, son of Thomas Mag Samradhain and Maelmordha son of Failge, son of Domnall Ua Raighilligh the Fair, were taken in the same place. At instigation of Domnall Gapped-tooth, son of Thomas Mag Samradhain, those deeds were done. Thomas, son of Thomas Mag Samradhain, was slain there and Maelmordha, son of Failge, son of Domnall Ua Raighillgh the Fair, was taken by them in the same place, namely, on the 4th of the Nones of June (2nd of June). Mag Samradhain was let out from his captivity on the 4th of the Nones of July (4th of July).

== Chieftainship ==
Feidhlimidh had a stronghold on a crannog in Killywillin Lough and he met his death while there on Sunday 15 February 1495, possibly at the instigation of Domhnall who then took the chieftaincy and moved to the chief's residence in Ballymagauran.

The Annals of the Four Masters for 1495 state-

Magauran (Felim, the son of Thomas, son of Brian Breaghach), Chief of Teallach-Eachdhach (Tullyhaw), was drowned in Loch-Crannoige of Caill-an-mhuillinn; and Donnell Bearnagh, his brother, took his place.

The Annals of Ulster for 1495 state-

Mag Samradhain, namely, Feidhlimidh, son of Thomas, son of Ferghal, son of Thomas, son of Brian the Bregian, namely, chief of Tellach-Eathach, was drowned in the lake of the crannog of Caill-an-muilinn, the feast day of Berach, Sunday, this year and his other brother, namely, Domnall Gapped tooth, was made Mag Samradhain.

The Annals of Loch Cé for 1495 state-

Mac Samhradhain, i.e. Fedhlim, was drowned; and Domhnall Bernach was proclaimed Mac Samradhain in his place.

The Annals of Connacht for 1495 state-

Mac Samradain, that is Feidlim, was drowned and Domnall Bernach was proclaimed Mac Samradain in succession to him.

== Death ==
On 15 February 1496 Domhnall was killed by his nephews in Templeport Church. As this was on the anniversary of the previous chief's drowning it may have been in revenge for that and the killing probably happened during the anniversary mass.

The Annals of Ulster for 1496 state-

Mag Samradhain, namely, Domnall Gapped-tooth, son of Thomas, son of Fergal Mag Samradhain, was slain in treachery by Maghnus, son of Thomas, son of Thomas, son of Fergal Mag Samradhain and by the sons of Aedh, son of Eogan, son of Thomas, son of Fergal and by the sons of Brian of Tellach-Eathach, namely, Tadhg and Philip, that is, sons of Feidhlimidh, son of Brian. In Tempoll-an-puirt that was done, on the feast day of Berach, at the end of a year from the day his other brother and his tribe-head was drowned.

The Annals of Loch Cé for 1496 state-

Mac Samhradhain, i.e. Domhnall Bernach, son of Thomas, son of Ferghal, was killed in treachery.

The Annals of Connacht for 1496 state-

Mac Samradain, that is Domnall Bernach son of Tomas son of Fergal, was treacherously killed.

== Family ==
Domhnall had at least two sons, Brian who was killed in 1507, and Domhnall Óg, who died in 1532.

Preceded by Feidhlimidh Mág Samhradháin, the First	Chief of McGovern clan 1495–1496 AD	Succeeded by Éamonn Mág Samhradháin
