= Eóghan Mág Samhradháin =

Eóghan Mág Samhradháin (anglicised Owen McGovern) was chief of the McGovern Clan and Baron or Lord of Tullyhaw barony, County Cavan from 1458 until his death in 1460.

== Ancestry ==
His ancestry was Eóghan son of Tomás Óg 'na Fésóige' Mág Samhradháin (d. 1458) son of Fearghal (d. 1393) son of Tomás (d. 1343) son of Brian ‘Breaghach’ Mág Samhradháin (d. 1298). His father was chief of the clan and his mother was the daughter of the chief of the McKiernan clan of Tullyhunco, County Cavan. His full brother was Fearghal and his half-brothers were Brian Caech, Tighearnán, Maol Sheachlainn Dubh, Feidhlimidh Mág Samhradháin, the First a later chief of the clan, Tomás Óg, Brian, Domhnall ‘Bernach’ Mág Samhradháin a later chief of the clan, Donnchadh (who was Tánaiste of the clan and died in 1486) and Toirdealbhach.

== Chieftainship ==
On the death of the McGovern chief, his father Tomás Óg 'na Feasoige' Mág Samhradháin the Third, in 1458, Eóghan took the chieftaincy and moved to the chief’s residence in Ballymagauran.

The following year Ballymagauran was raided and burned by the Maguire clan.

The Annals of the Four Masters for 1459 state-

The spoils of Magh Slecht were seized on by Maguire (Thomas Oge); and Ballymagauran was burned by him on this occasion.

The Annals of Ulster for 1459 state-

The spoils of Magh-slecht were carried off the same year by Mag Uidhir, namely, by Thomas Mag Uidhir junior and the town of Mag Samradhain was burned by him on that expedition.

== Death ==
Eóghan died in 1460.

The Annals of the Four Masters for 1460 state-

Magauran, Owen, died.

The Annals of Ulster for 1460 state-

Mag Samradhain, namely, Eogan Mag Samradhain, died this year.

The Annals of Loch Cé for 1460 state-

Mac Samhradhain died, i.e. Eoghan.

== Family ==
Eóghan's wife was Nuala, daughter of Lochlann O'Rourke, the King of East Breifne O’Ruairc from 1435 to 1458. His sons were Éamonn Mág Samhradháin a later chief of the clan, Cathal, Maghnus, Aodh, Fearghal, Uaithne and Tadhg.

Preceded by Tomás Óg 'na Fésóige' Mág Samhradháin	Chief of McGovern clan 1458–1460 AD	Succeeded by Cathal Mág Samhradháin
