= McGovern =

McGovern may refer to the following:

- McGovern (name), surname of Irish origin
- McGovern Institute for Brain Research

People:

- Alison McGovern (b. 1980), British Labour politician
- Barry McGovern, Irish Actor
- Bill McGovern (American football) (1962–2023), American football coach
- Brian Magauran b.1592 was chief of the McGovern Clan of Tullyhaw, County Cavan from 1622 until his death.
- Brian Mág Samhradháin (anglicised McGovern), chief of the McGovern Clan of Tullyhaw, County Cavan from c.1240 to 1258.
- Brian 'Breaghach' Mág Samhradháin (anglicised McGovern), chief of the McGovern Clan of Tullyhaw, County Cavan from 1272 to 3 May 1294.
- Brian Óg Mág Samhradháin (anglicised Brian McGovern Junior) d. 1584, was chief of the McGovern Clan of Tullyhaw, County Cavan until his death in 1584.
- Brian McGovern (footballer), former Irish professional footballer
- Colonel Bryan Magauran, the Sixth, (Gaelic- Brian Mág Samhradháin) was the last chief of the McGovern Clan of Tullyhaw, County Cavan for a brief period at the end of the 17th century.
- Cathal Mág Samhradháin, the First, (anglicised Charles McGovern) was chief of the McGovern Clan of Tullyhaw, County Cavan from 1460 until his death in 1478.
- Cathal Mág Samhradháin, the Second, (anglicised Charles McGovern) was chief of the McGovern Clan of Tullyhaw, County Cavan from 1504 until his death in 1512.
- Charles Magauran, the Third, (Gaelic- Cathal Mág Samhradháin) was chief of the McGovern Clan of Tullyhaw, County Cavan including the period 1641 to 1657.
- Cormac Mác Shamhradháin, Bishop of Ardagh 1444–1476
- Des McGovern (1928–2013), Australian rugby league footballer
- Domhnall 'Bernach' Mág Samhradháin (anglicised Donal 'Gap-Tooth' McGovern) was chief of the McGovern Clan of Tullyhaw, County Cavan from 1495 until his death on 15 February 1496.
- Donnchadh 'Cime' Mág Samhradháin (anglicised McGovern), chief of the McGovern Clan of Tullyhaw, County Cavan from 1258 to 1269.
- Éamonn Mág Samhradháin (anglicised Eamon McGovern) was chief of the McGovern Clan of Tullyhaw, County Cavan from 1496 until his death in 1504.
- Edmund MacGauran, Archbishop of Armagh 1587–1593
- Elizabeth McGovern, American film and television actress
- Eóghan Mág Samhradháin (anglicised Owen McGovern) was chief of the McGovern Clan of Tullyhaw, County Cavan from 1458 until his death in 1460.
- Eugene McGovern, former Irish/Munster rugby player
- Fearghal Mág Samhradháin, (anglicised Fergal McGovern) was chief of the McGovern Clan of Tullyhaw, County Cavan from 1359 until his death in 1393.
- Feidhlimidh Mág Samhradháin, the First (anglicised Phelim McGovern) was chief of the McGovern Clan of Tullyhaw, County Cavan from 1478 until his death on 15 February 1495
- Feidhlimidh Mág Samhradháin, the Second, (anglicised Felim McGovern), chief of the McGovern Clan of Tullyhaw, County Cavan from before 1611 until his death on 20 January 1622.
- Francis E. McGovern, Governor of Wisconsin
- George McGovern (1922–2012), American politician from South Dakota, 1972 Democratic presidential nominee
  - Eleanor McGovern (1921–2007), wife of George McGovern
- Giolla Íosa Mág Samhradháin, (d.1231) was chief of the McGovern Clan of Tullyhaw, County Cavan from c.1200–1231.
- Giolla na Naomh Mág Samhradháin, the First, was chief of the McGovern Clan of Tullyhaw, County Cavan from c.1160–1200.
- Iggy McGovern ((born 1948), Irish poet and physicists
- J. Raymond McGovern, New York State Comptroller (1951–1954)
- James McGovern (disambiguation), various
- Jim McGovern (American politician), American politician from Massachusetts
- John McGovern (soldier), Victorian Cross recipient
- John McGovern (footballer, born 1949), Scottish footballer
- John McGovern (politician), Scottish politician
- Jonny McGovern, American stand-up comedian and musician
- Maghnus Mág Samhradháin, the First, (anglicised Manus McGovern) was chief of the McGovern Clan of Tullyhaw, County Cavan from 1294 until his murder in 1299.
- Maghnus 'Ruadh' Mág Samhradháin, the Second, (anglicised 'Red' Manus McGovern) was chief of the McGovern Clan of Tullyhaw, County Cavan from 1393 until his murder in 1408.
- Maureen McGovern, American singer
- Michael McGovern (disambiguation), several people
- Muireadhach Mág Samhradhán, (anglicised Murtagh McGovern) was the first person to bear the surname McGovern and was chief of the McGovern Clan of Tullyhaw, County Cavan from c.1120–1160.
- Niall Mág Samhradháin, (anglicised Niall McGovern) was chief of the McGovern Clan of Tullyhaw, County Cavan from 1340 until his death in 1359.
- Owen Roe McGovern, former Cavan Gaelic footballer
- Patrick McGovern (disambiguation), various
- Peter McGovern (1927–2006), English songwriter and activist
- Ray McGovern, former CIA agent and member of Veteran Intelligence Professionals for Sanity (VIPS)
- Robert M. McGovern, soldier in the United States Army during the Korean War
- Sylvester McGovern (1895-1977), American political commentator, author, and radio host
- Tim McGovern (1955–2024), American visual effects artist
- Tomás Mág Samhradháin (anglicised McGovern) was chief of the McGovern Clan of Tullyhaw, County Cavan from 1269 to 1272.
- Tomás Mág Samhradháin the Second, (anglicised Thomas McGovern) was chief of the McGovern Clan of Tullyhaw, County Cavan from before 1325 until his death in 1340.
- Tomás Óg 'na Fésóige' Mág Samhradháin, the Third, (anglicised Thomas McGovern, Junior 'of the beard') was chief of the McGovern Clan of Tullyhaw, County Cavan from 1393 until his death in 1458.
- Tomás Mág Samhradháin, the Fourth (anglicised Thomas McGovern) was chief of the McGovern Clan of Tullyhaw, County Cavan from 1512 until his death in 1532.
- Tomas Óg Mág Samhradháin (anglicised McGovern) was chief of the McGovern Clan of Tullyhaw, County Cavan from 1584 until the end of the 16th century.
- Uaithne Mág Samhradháin (anglicised Owny McGovern) was chief of the McGovern Clan of Tullyhaw, County Cavan from 1540 until his death.
- William Montgomery McGovern (1897–1964), was possible inspiration for the character of Indiana Jones, as an American anthropologist, journalist, political scientist, and professor.

Places:

- McGovern, Pennsylvania
- Ballymcgovern, Co. Cavan,
