= Tomás Mág Samhradháin =

Tomás mac Aodh Mág Samhradháin, head of the McGovern lineage and Baron or Lord of Tullyhaw barony, County Cavan from 1269 to 1272.

== Ancestry ==
His father was Aedh Mág Samhradháin and his half-brother or step-brother was Donnchadh ‘Cime’ Mág Samhradháin who was chief from 1258-1269.

== Chieftainship ==
In 1269 he murdered his half-brother or step-brother, Donnchadh ‘Cime’ Mág Samhradháin, in an internecine struggle for the chieftaincy. He was then elected chief.

The Annals of Ulster for 1269 state-

Donnchadh Mag Shamhrudhain rested in Christ.

The Annals of Connacht 1272 state-

Donnchad son of Gilla na Naem Mag Samradain was killed by Tomas mac Aeda Mag Samradain, his own brother.

The Annals of the Four Masters 1272 state-

Donough, son of Gilla-na-naev Magauran, was slain by his brother Thomas.

The Annals of Loch Cé 1272 state-

Donnchadh, son of Gilla-na-naemh Mac Shamhradhain, was killed by Thomas Mac Shamhradhain, i.e. his own brother.

== Death ==
Tomás was killed in 1272 A.D. in an encounter with the Cenel Luachain clan of Oughteragh parish, barony of Carrigallen, County Leitrim. As he was succeeded by Brian ‘Breaghach’ Mág Samhradháin, the son of the murdered Donnchadh ‘Cime’ Mág Samhradháin, Tomás seems to have been airbrushed out of the McGovern history because of his fratricide. He does not appear in the Book of Magauran or in any of the McGovern genealogies.

The Annals of Ulster for 1272 state-

Thomas Mag Shamhrughain was killed by the Cenel-Luachan.

The Annals of the Four Masters 1275 state- Thomas Magauran was slain by the Kinel-Luachain.

The Annals of Loch Cé 1275 state- Thomas Mac Shamhradhain was slain by the Cenel-Duachain.

The Annals of Connacht 1275 state-

Tomas Mag Samradain was killed by the Cenel Luachain.

Preceded by Donnchadh ‘Cime’ Mág Samhradháin	Chief of McGovern clan 1269–1272 AD	Succeeded by Brian ‘Breaghach’ Mág Samhradháin
