= Battle of Fiodh-an-Átha =

14th century battle in Ireland

The Battle of Fiodh an Átha was fought in 1327 according to the Annals of Ulster or, less likely, 1330 according to the Annals of the Four Masters, at what is now Finnea, County Westmeath, Ireland. The Annals of Ulster for 1327 state: "A hosting by Ualgharc O'Ruairc, king of Breifni, to Fidh-in-atha. The Foreigners of the town arose against them, so that Art O'Ruairc, material of a king of Breifni and many others were killed there."

The Annals of the Four Masters for 1330 state: "An army was led by Ualgarg O'Rourke to Fiodh-an-atha, whereupon the English of that town rose up against him. O'Rourke's people were defeated; and Art O'Rourke, a materies of a chief lord of Breifny, Rory Magauran, and many others, were slain by the English."

The Annals of Loch Cé for 1330 state: "A hosting by O'Ruairc to Fidh-an-atha, when the people of the town opposed them, and O'Ruairc was defeated, and Art O'Ruairc, who was qualified to be king of Breifne, was killed there, and a great many more, both good and bad."

The Annals of Connacht for 1330 state: "O Ruairc went on a hosting to Finnae. The people of the town rose against him and defeated him and Art O Ruairc, an eligible prince of Brefne, was killed, with many others, gentle and simple."

John Pembridge's Annals for 1331 state: "Item, apud Ffynnagh in Midia, strages Hibernicorum per Anglicos ejusdem terre undecimo die mensis Junii."

Grace's Annals for 1331 state: "at Finnagh, in Meath, some are killed by the English inhabitants on the 19th of June".

The modern historian Dennis Showalter, writing in 2013, placed the battle in 1330. He notes that Ualgarg O'Ruairc, King of Breifne, led a force against Fiodh-an-Átha (modern day Finnea in County Westmeath) and was defeated by the Anglo-Norman townspeople. O'Ruairc's heir, Art O'Ruairc was among those killed.
