= Brian Mág Samhradháin =

Clan chief in 13th century Ireland

Brian Mág Samhradháin, the First, (anglicised McGovern) was chief of the McGovern Clan and Baron or Lord of Tullyhaw barony, County Cavan from c.1240-1258.

== Chieftainship ==
On the death of the McGovern chief Giolla na Naomh Mág Samhradháin c.1240, Brian took the chieftaincy. He came under attack from Felim Ua Conchobair who was King of Connacht from 1233 - 1265.

The Annals of Connacht for the year 1256 state-

After the battle of Magh Slécht, Fedlim O Conchobair and his son Aed na nGall, with the men of Connacht, and Tigernan O Ruairc, with the men of Brefne, made an expedition to Loch in Trein; and the two armies fell upon the churches of Brefne, all except Fenagh, and returned to their homes with hostages of the Fir Brefne, that is, of Mac Fiachrach and Mac Tigernain and Mag Samradain and of the son of Art O Ruairc; and Fedlim gave the hostages of the chieftains into the custody of O Ruairc and handed over Mag Samradain to his own son, Aed na nGall. Conchobar son of Tigernan O Ruairc, king of Brefne, and Gilla na Naem Mag Samradain and Mac Raith Mag Tigernain, the son of Cu Buide, and Mac na hOidche Mag Dorchaid and Cathal Mag Ragnaill and the sons of the kings and chieftains of the Ui Briuin with their followers came to Fenagh to meet with Domnall O Raigillig. They pursued him from the meeting-place and killed his beloved son Annad and Gilla Isa Mac in Chrottaig (Son of the Hunchback) [O Raigillig?] and many others. Next day, St. Brendan's day, they took a great prey out of Cruacha O Cubrain and plundered the country all the way to Fenagh. That day was ‘a drop before a shower’ to the Muinter Raigillig, since from it proceeded the beginning of the harm and harassing that afterwards befell them. For it is then that they sent envoys to the Connacht Galls, Macwilliam Burke and Mac Gosdelb, [inviting them] to destroy Connacht and Brefne.

The Annals of Loch Cé for the year 1256 state-

Another great hosting, after this battle, by Fedhlim O'Conchobhair and his son, i.e. Aedh-na-nGall, accompanied by the Connachtmen, and by Conn, son of Tighernan, with the men of Breifne; and these two hosts came, moreover, to Loch-an-trein, and attacked the churches of Breifne except Fidhnacha alone, and turned back to their houses, taking with them the hostages of the men of Breifne, viz.:— of Mac Fiachrach, and MacTighernain, and Mac Shamhradhain, and the son of Art O'Ruairc; and these hostages, i.e. the sons of these chieftains, were delivered into the hands of O'Ruairc; and Mac Shamhradhain and the son of Art O'Ruairc delivered their own hostages to Aedh-na-nGall. A small force of cavalry, and a few footmen and mercenaries of O'Ruairc's people, went to patrol the territory of Muinter-Maelmordha, for it had been reported to O'Ruairc that emissaries of O'Raighilligh's people had collected to one place all the force that they found of Foreign and Gaeidhelic mercenaries, who had gone to make a circuit of Muinter-Maelmordha, and on a predatory expedition to Mac Fiachrach. As regards Muinter-Raighilligh, however, they encountered O'Ruairc's people at Farnacht; and when they saw each other's faces, Muinter-Raighilligh gave way, although they were three great battalions. Not alone this; but thirty-six men of them were slain on the spot, eight of whom bore the family name of O'Raighilligh, including Amhlaibh O'Raighilligh, and Aedh, son of Cathal O'Raighilligh; and O'Ruairc's people went home joyously, contentedly, without sorrow, without reverse. Conchobhar, son of Tighernan O'Ruairc, king of Breifne, and Gilla-na-naemh Mac Shamhradhain, and Macraith, son of Tighernan Mac Conbhuidhe, and Mac-na-hoidhche Mac Dorchaidh, and Cathal Mac Raghnaill, and the princes and chieftains of Uí-Briuin, with their forces, came to Fidhnacha to a meeting with Domhnall O'Raighilligh; and they followed him from this meeting, and killed his beloved son, i.e. Annadh O'Raighilligh, and Gilla-Isa Mac-an-Crottaigh, and many more along with them; and they carried off a great prey from Cruachan-O'Cúbhrán on the morrow, i.e. the festival day of Brenainn, and plundered the district before them as far as Fidhnacha of Magh-Rein. This day, however, was but a 'drop before a shower' to Muinter-Raighilligh, as then grew the beginning of succeeding tribulation and injury to them; for they despatched messengers at that time to the Foreigners, viz.:—to Mac William Burk and to Mac Goisdelbh, with a view to devastating Connacht and the Breifne. As regards the Foreigners, moreover, they assembled a very great host, and proceeded to Ceis-Corainn, where they encamped, and where they remained the greater part of a week; and they plundered all the churches of the Corann. As to Muinter-Raighilligh, they advanced to Loch-Aillinne, to the shore of the island which is called Fuar-chossach, on Loch-Aillinne; but the Foreigners came not to this rendezvous, through fear of Aedh O'Conchobhair, who was then at Cill-tSeisin in Uachtar-tire, observing these hosts from the east and from the west, and watching which of them he should attack. With regard to Aedh O'Conchobhair, when he heard that Muinter-Raighilligh had arrived at the place, the resolution which he and O'Ruairc (who was at this time with him) adopted, was to leave their horses and armour at Cill-tSeisin, and to go themselves on foot eastwards across the Shannon, to make an attack on Muinter-Raighilligh; and they went by the passes, and sent routs and mercenaries on before them, to catch Muinter-Raighilligh, ut supra diximus. The Foreigners returned home after this, and the Bishop O'Maicin was 'drowning their candles' about nones, when it was equally dark in field and wood. On the night of the festival of the Cross, truly, Muinter-Raighilligh were routed; and it was on the spot in which this engagement was fought that Aedh O'Conchobhair passed that night; and Muinter-Raighilligh were beheaded by him on the morrow in that place, and he brought their heads to Fedhlim, to Dun-Aille behind Badhna.

The Annals of Loch Cé for 1257 state-

A great depredation was committed on Mac Shamhradhain by the people of Aedh, son of Fedhlim O'Conchobhair.

== Death ==
The Annals of the Four Masters for 1258 state-

Brian Magauran, Chief of Tealach Eachdhach, was slain by the Connacians.

The Annals of Loch Cé for 1258 state-

Brian Mac Shamhradhain, dux of Tellach-Echach, was killed by the Connachtmen.

Preceded by Giolla na Naomh Mág Samhradháin (the Second)	Chief of McGovern clan 1240–1258 AD	Succeeded by Donnchadh ‘Cime’ Mág Samhradháin
