= Feidhlimidh mac Tomás Óg Mág Samhradháin =

Feidhlimidh Mág Samhradháin, the First (anglicised Phelim McGovern) was chief of the McGovern Clan and Baron or Lord of Tullyhaw barony, County Cavan from 1478 until his death on 15 February 1495.

== Ancestry ==
His ancestry was Feidhlimidh son of Tomás Óg 'na Fésóige' Mág Samhradháin (d. 1458) son of Fearghal (d. 1393) son of Tomás (d. 1343) son of Brian ‘Breaghach’ Mág Samhradháin (d. 1298). His mother was Raghnailt, daughter of Muircheartach Ó Conchobhair. His father Tomás Óg 'na Fésóige' Mág Samhradháin, the Third, was chief of the clan until his death in 1458. Feidhlimidh was the eldest son and his full brothers were Tomás Óg and Brian. His half-brothers were Domhnall ‘Bernach’ Mág Samhradháin (was succeeded him as chief of the clan on his death in 1495), Maol Sheachlainn Dubh, Brian Caech, Donnchadh (who was Tánaiste of the clan and died in 1486), Toirdealbhach, Tighearnán, Fearghal and Eóghan Mág Samhradháin also a chief of the clan.

== Chieftainship ==
On the death of the McGovern chief in 1478, Feidhlimidh's first cousin Cathal Mág Samhradháin, Feidhlimidh took the chieftaincy and moved to the chief's residence in Ballymagauran.

On Tuesday 27 September 1485 Ballymagauran was burned during a raid by the O’Reilly clan but the McGoverns retaliated.

The Annals of the Four Masters for 1485 state-

O'Reilly, i.e. Turlough, the son of John, son of Owen, went into Teallach Eachdhach (Tullyhaw), and burned the town of Magauran (i.e. Felim), and the town of his brother Donough. On the following day Magauran, with his kinsmen, went in pursuit of the O’Reilly army, and deprived them of sixteen men, who were killed or taken prisoners, and two hundred horses

The Annals of Ulster for 1485 state-

Ua Raighilligh, namely, Toirdelbach, son of John, son of Eogan, went with a great host into Tellach-Eathach the Tuesday Sep. 27 before Michaelmas and the town of Mag Samradhain, namely, the town of Feidhlimidh, son of Thomas, son of Ferghal, was burned by him and the town of his brother, namely, of Donchadh, was burned by him. Mag Samradhain and his kinsmen and every force they could muster went in pursuit of the host on the morrow, took or slew 16 men and wrested 200 horses from the host. Mac Caba and three sons of Toirdelbach Mac Caba the Freckled, namely, Redmund and Donchadh and Mail-Sheachlainn, were taken there and Gilla-Crisd, son of Toirdelbach Mac Caba the Freckled and Alexander, son of Conla, son of Lochlann and Failghi, son of Glaisne, son of Aedh Mac Caba, were slain there.

The latter part of Feidhlimidh's reign was troubled by internecine warfare between him and his relations in a struggle over the chieftainship.

The Annals of Ulster for 1486 state-

A skirmish took place between the Tellach-Eathach themselves, wherein was slain Feidhlimidh, son of Ferghal Mag Samradhain.

In 1487 the McGoverns were at war with the chief of the O'Reilly clan, John O'Reilly. During the same year an Irish translation (Togail na Tebe) of a Roman poem from 91 A.D., the Thebaid by Publius Papinius Statius was transcribed by Diarmaid Bacach mac Parthalain (Dermot "The Lame" MacPartland). The introduction to the translation states that the transcriber enjoyed- the hospitality of Felim the son of Thomas the son of Fergus son of that Thomas lord of Tullyhaw during the time when this book was written.

The Annals of the Four Masters for 1494 state-

Turlough, the son of Donough, son of Thomas Magauran, was slain by a cast of a javelin by the sons of Owen, son of Thomas, and Farrell, the son of Thomas, son of Thomas Magauran.

The Annals of Ulster for 1494 state-

Toirdelbach, son of Donchadh, son of Thomas Mag Samradhain, was slain by the sons of Eogan, son of Thomas Mag Samradhain and by Fergal, son of Thomas Mag Samradhain, with shot of arrow about May Day. And Edmond Mac Sitriug (namely, a kern) it was that shot the arrow.

Feidhlimidh's half-brother, Domhnall ‘Bernach’ Mág Samhradháin, enlisted the aid of the Maguire clan in his bid for the chieftainship and Feidhlimidh was captured by them on 2 June 1494 but released a few weeks later on 4 July.

The Annals of Ulster for 1494 state-

Mag Samradhain, namely, Feidhlimidh, son of Thomas Mag Samradhain, was taken by some of the sons of Brian Mag Uidhir, namely, Ruaidhri and Brian junior, and by Philip, son of Toirdelbach Mag Uidhir, and by the sons of Redmond Mag Uidhir, namely, Donchadh and Aedh, at instigation of the brother of Mag Samradhain himself, namely, Donnall Gapped-tooth. And Fergal, son of Fergal, son of Thomas Mag Samradhain, was slain by the descendants of Philip Mag Uidhir. And Mag Samradhain himself, namely, Feidhlimidh, son of Thomas Mag Samradhain and Maelmordha son of Failge, son of Domnall Ua Raighilligh the Fair, were taken in the same place. At instigation of Domnall Gapped-tooth, son of Thomas Mag Samradhain, those deeds were done. Thomas, son of Thomas Mag Samradhain, was slain there and Maelmordha, son of Failge, son of Domnall Ua Raighillgh the Fair, was taken by them in the same place, namely, on the 4th of the Nones of June (2nd of June). Mag Samradhain was let out from his captivity on the 4th of the Nones of July (4th of July).

1494 also saw conflict with the McManus clan of Fermanagh, an offshoot of the Maguire clan.

The Annals of the Four Masters for 1494 state-

James, the son of Mac Manus, was slain by a dart cast at him by one of the sons of Cormac Magauran. It was Edmond, the son of Cormac, son of Manus, who threw the dart, (the Mac Manus referred to was Cathal Óg Mac Maghnusa, the compiler of the Annals of Ulster).

The Annals of Ulster for 1494 state-

Mac Maghnusa, was slain with shot of arrow by the sons of Cormac Mag Samradhain and Edmond, son of Maghnus, son of Cormac, that shot the arrow.

== Death ==
Feidhlimidh had a stronghold on a crannog in Killywillin Lough and he met his death while there on Sunday 15 February 1495.

The Annals of the Four Masters for 1495 state-

Magauran (Felim, the son of Thomas, son of Brian Breaghach), Chief of Teallach-Eachdhach (Tullyhaw), was drowned in Loch-Crannoige of Caill-an-mhuillinn; and Donnell Bearnagh, his brother, took his place.

The Annals of Ulster for 1495 state-

Mag Samradhain, namely, Feidhlimidh, son of Thomas, son of Ferghal, son of Thomas, son of Brian the Bregian, namely, chief of Tellach-Eathach, was drowned in the lake of the crannog of Caill-an-muilinn, the feast day of Berach, Sunday, this year and his other brother, namely, Domnall Gapped tooth, was made Mag Samradhain.

The Annals of Loch Cé for 1495 state-

Mac Samhradhain, i.e. Fedhlim, was drowned; and Domhnall Bernach was proclaimed Mac Samradhain in his place.

The Annals of Connacht for 1495 state-

Mac Samradain, that is Feidlim, was drowned and Domnall Bernach was proclaimed Mac Samradain in succession to him.

Preceded by Cathal Mág Samhradháin	Chief of McGovern clan 1478–1495 AD	Succeeded by Domhnall ‘Bernach’ Mág Samhradháin
