= Donnchadh Cime Mág Samhradháin =

Donnchadh ‘Cime’ Mág Samhradháin (anglicised McGovern) was chief of the McGovern Clan and Baron or Lord of Tullyhaw barony, County Cavan from 1258 to 1269.

== Ancestry ==
His ancestry was Donnchadh son of Giolla na Naomh Mág Samhradháin (the Second) son of Giolla Íosa Mág Samhradháin (d. 1231) son of Giolla na Naomh Mág Samhradháin, the First, (fl. 1170) son of Muireadhach Mág Samhradhán(fl. 1130) son of Samhradhán (fl. 1100), who were all previous chiefs of the clan. Donnchadh's nickname 'Cime' is translated as 'a captive' perhaps meaning he had been a hostage in his youth. Alternatively there is a placename in Tullyhaw called Port Cime so he may have lived there.

== Head of the lineage ==
On the death of the McGovern chief Brian Mág Samhradháin in 1258, Donnchadh took the chieftaincy.

== Description ==
Poem 2, stanza 7, by Giolla Pádraig mac Naimhin, written c.1290-1298, in the Book of Magauran describe Donnchadh as Donnchadh Cime of the royal stock.

Poem 26, stanza 26, written c.1339, in the Book of Magauran describes him as Donnchadh of Durlas, so his residence may have been called Durlas. He is also described therein as Donnchadh of Dún Uisnigh.

== Death ==
In 1269 he was murdered by his half-brother or step-brother Tomás Mág Samhradháin in an internecine struggle for the chieftaincy.

The Annals of Ulster for 1269 state-

Donnchadh Mag Shamhrudhain rested in Christ.

The Annals of Connacht 1272 state-

Donnchad son of Gilla na Naem Mag Samradain was killed by Tomas mac Aeda Mag Samradain, his own brother.

The Annals of the Four Masters 1272 state-

Donough, son of Gilla-na-naev Magauran, was slain by his brother Thomas.

The Annals of Loch Cé 1272 state-

Donnchadh, son of Gilla-na-naemh Mac Shamhradhain, was killed by Thomas Mac Shamhradhain, i.e. his own brother.

== Family ==
His wife was May Mór Ni Ruairc, a daughter of Amlaíb O Ruairc, king of West Breifne from 1257–1258. His sons included Brian ‘Breaghach’ Mág Samhradháin who was chief from 1272 until 1298, Maghnus Mág Samhradháin (who succeeded to the chieftaincy on Brian's death and ruled from 1298 to 1303) and Macraith Mág Samhradháin, the ancestor of two McGovern bishops (Cormac Mác Shamhradháin of Ardagh and Cormac Mág Shamhradháin of Kilmore).

Preceded by Brian Mág Samhradháin	Chief of McGovern clan 1258–1269 AD	Succeeded by Tomás Mág Samhradháin
