= Giolla na Naomh mac Giolla Íosa Mág Samhradháin =

Giolla na Naomh Mág Samhradháin (the Second), was chief of the McGovern Clan and Baron or Lord of Tullyhaw barony, County Cavan from c.1231 to 1240.

== Ancestry ==
His ancestry was Giolla na Naomh son of Giolla Íosa Mág Samhradháin son of Giolla na Naomh Mág Samhradháin, the First, son of Muireadhach Mág Samhradhán who was the son of Samhradhán mac Conchobhar mac Fearghal mac Flann mac Aonghus mac Conchobhar mac Tadhg Tir mac Ruarc mac Íomhaor mac Cosgrach mac Dúnghal mac Oireachtach mac Eochaidh (Teallach n-Eachach or Tullyhaw is named after the latter).

== Description ==
Poem 2, stanza 7, by Giolla Pádraig mac Naimhin, written c.1290-1298, in the Book of Magauran describes him as fresh Giolla na Naomh.

== Family ==
His son was Donnchadh ‘Cime’ Mág Samhradháin, who was chief of the clan from 1258 – 1269.

Preceded by Giolla Íosa Mág Samhradháin	Chief of McGovern clan 1231–1240 AD	Succeeded by Brian Mág Samhradháin
