= Cormac Mác Shamhradháin =

Mid-15th-century bishop of Ardagh

Cormac Mác Shamhradháin O.S.A., (Anglicised as Cormack Magauran or McGovern) b. c.1410-d.1476, was the Roman Catholic Bishop of Ardagh diocese in Ireland from 1444 to 1476.

== Genealogy and Birth ==
Cormac Mác Shamhradháin was a member of the McGovern clan, rulers in the Middle Ages of the tuath of Teallach n-Eachach in Breifne (now Tullyhaw, County Cavan, Ireland). He was born c. 1410, probably in or near Drumlane Abbey, County Cavan, where his father, Piaras Mág Shamhradháin O.S.A., was the Prior until his death in 1431. As the son of a priest, Cormac was definitionally illegitimate at birth. Cormac was descended from the chief who ruled Tullyhaw from 1258 to 1272, Donnchadh Cime Mág Samhradháin. His pedigree is Cormac mac Piaras mac Aindriu mac Cleiminnt mac Tomás Amhlaoibh mac Craithe mac Donnchadh Cime Mág Samhradháin.

== Priesthood and Drumlane Abbey ==
Cormac was presumably educated at Drumlane Abbey which was founded about the 6th century AD by Saint Columba. The abbey was a chapter house of the Augustinian Abbey of Kells, County Meath that was dedicated to Saint Mary. Cormac was ordained a priest and joined the Augustinian Order, becoming a canon. On 10 April 1430 Cormac was awarded the rectory of Templeport on the death of the previous holder, Renaldus McGovern. The Papal Registers state- To the prior of Inchmacnerin (Insula Macneri) in the diocese of Elphin. Mandate to collate and assign to Cormac Magamrughan, Augustinian canon of St. Mary's de Kenlys in the diocese of Meath, who is of noble race, the rectory, value not exceeding 20 marks, wont to be held by canons of St. Mary's, of Teallacheach and Mageangady in the diocese of Kilmore, void by the death of Renaldus Magamrugham, summoning and removing the abbot and convent of the said monastery, who have unduly detained possession for more than two years, and whom he fears to meet within the city or diocese. He is hereby dispensed on account of his illegitimacy as the son of a canon of the said order, a priest, and an unmarried woman. On the death of his father Piaras in 1431, Cormac succeeded to the post of Prior of Drumlane due to hereditary succession rights. He would have been in his early twenties at the time.

The McGovern clan, through the ages, were associated with Drumlane and, in the 15th century alone, at least five of its members were appointed Prior. The ecclesiastical offices in Drumlane (Abbott, Prior, Parish Priest) were generally split between the McGoverns who were the hereditary erenachs, and the O'Farrellys who were the hereditary coarbs of Drumlane. In Canon Law, the right to appoint the Prior was reserved to the Pope and so in 1436, the matter of succession was submitted to Pope Eugene IV. He appointed the Archdeacon of Hainault in Liege to settle the matter by examining Cormac and other witnesses. As a result, Cormac was deprived of the office and Patrick O'Farrelly was appointed. O'Farrelly died c.1439 and Cormac then reclaimed possession of the Priory on the plea dispositionis ordinarie (collation by the ordinary). On Cormac's 1444 elevation to the See of Ardagh, the Pope appointed Thady Magauran as Prior of Drumlane.

== Bishop of Ardagh ==
On the death of Risdeárd Ó Fearghail, the Bishop of Ardagh, in 1444, the local Ardagh clergy selected "the young official MacMuircherty" (probably Tomas mac Murchada who was Dean of Ardagh in 1468) as their candidate for bishop and forwarded their recommendation to the Pope. This proposal was rejected by the Vatican and Cormac Mác Shamhradháin was appointed on 6 November 1444 by Pope Eugene IV. Cormac also secured a dispensation from the illegitimacy that would have barred him from episcopal office. On 19 November 1444, Cormac was licensed to be consecrated by bishops of his choice. Cormac evidently won the appointment because he travelled to Rome to plead his case, while MacMuircherty remained in Ireland. Cormac probably used his influence with the Augustinians to support his petition. The Pope may have offered the office of Drumlane Prior to the Pope as a quid pro quo for the Ardagh bishopric.

=== Excommunication ===
Cormac returned to Ireland in 1445, and paid a fee of 33 florins for his appointment on 19 February 1445. The Ardagh clergy initially accepted his authority. MacFirbis Annals for 1445 state “The Bishop Magsamhradhan came from Rome and obtained the episcopacie of Ardachadh, and the Quire of Ardachadh, and young Officiall mcMuircherty, that was elected afore him, obeyed him haveing the Popes authoritie from Rome.” This state of affairs did not last long, as he was not a native of the diocese and throughout his tenure they attempted to have him deposed. At the end of 1451, Cormac was excommunicated by the Archbishop of Armagh John Mey, for his failure to pay metropolitan dues and submit to the Archbishop's Visitation and for fornication. Two of the Ardagh clergy were appointed by Mey to publicise the excommunication and offer absolution.

On 9 June 1460 Cormac attended the Provincial Synod of Armagh held under Archbishop John Bole at St. Peter's Church, Drogheda. In 1463 Seaán Ó Fearghail went to Rome to ask the pope to confirm him as bishop of Ardagh in lieu of Cormac and a writ of King Edward III of England dated 1463 describes Sean as bishop-elect of Ardagh, but he was never consecrated, probably because of his role at the same time in attempting to remove the Bishop of Cork and Cloyne Jordan Purcell using forged documents. Matters came to a head when Cormac offered his resignation to Pope Paul II in 1467 and on 12 October 1467 Donnchadh O'Fearghail was appointed Bishop of Ardagh, but he died before the papal bull was expedited.

The diocese was seemingly without an appointed bishop until 28 July 1469, when Seaán Ó Fearghail was appointed Bishop of Ardagh. However, these latter two appointments may not have reflected the actual situation in Ardagh diocese. There is evidence that Cormac reigned as bishop until his death in 1476 and only then did Fearghail take over. For example, in April–May 1470 Archbishop Bole stated that Cormac was bishop of Ardagh and the Annals of Connacht for the year 1476 state- "Bishop Mag Samradain died and Sean son of Brian succeeded him".

== Death ==
According to the Annals of Ireland, Cormac died in 1476 but his death was separately given as 1478, probably in error.

After his death a praise poem was written in his honour, giving his ancestry. It was probably composed c. 1487 by Diarmaid Bacach Mac Parrthaláin, a native of Tullyhaw and a scribe under the patronage of the McGovern chief.

== Descendants ==
Cormac left at least one son, also named Cormac Mág Shamhradháin who was born c. 1442. Like his father he was illegitimate and became the Prior of Drumlane in 1466. He was a priest in Templeport parish in 1461. His subsequent appointment as Bishop of Kilmore on 4 November 1476 was revoked on 20 October 1480 due to this illegitimacy. The son appealed the matter on several occasions and still held himself as Bishop of Kilmore upon his death in December 1511.
