= Giolla Íosa Mág Samhradháin =

Giolla Íosa Mág Samhradháin (died 1231) was chief of the McGovern Clan and Baron or Lord of Tullyhaw barony, County Cavan from about 1181 to 1231.

== Ancestry ==
His ancestry was Giolla Íosa Mág Samhradháin son of Giolla na Naomh Mág Samhradháin, the First, son of Muireadhach Mág Samhradhán who was the son of Samhradhán mac Conchobhar mac Fearghal mac Flann mac Aonghus mac Conchobhar mac Tadhg Tir mac Ruarc mac Íomhaor mac Cosgrach mac Dúnghal mac Oireachtach mac Eochaidh (Teallach n-Eachach or Tullyhaw is named after the latter).

== Description ==
Poem 2, stanza 7, by Giolla Pádraig mac Naimhin, written c.1290-1298, in the Book of Magauran describes Giolla Íosa as white-chested Giolla Íosa.

== Death ==
His death is noted in the Irish Annals for 1231 and this is the first time there is a specific mention of a McGovern chief in the Annals, which implies that the clan first became of regional importance under the rule of Giolla Íosa.

The Annals of the Four Masters 1231 state-

Gilla-Isa Magauran, Lord of Tealach Eachdhach died.

The Annals of Loch Cé 1231 state-

Gilla-Isa Mac Shamhradhain, dux of Tellach-Echach, quievit.

The Annals of Connacht 1231 state-

Gilla Isa Mac Samradain, chieftain of Tullyhaw, rested.

== Family ==
His son was Giolla na Naomh Mág Samhradháin (the Second), who was chief of the clan from 1231 – c.1240.

Preceded by Giolla na Naomh Mág Samhradháin, the First	Chief of McGovern clan 1181–1231 AD	Succeeded by Giolla na Naomh Mág Samhradháin (the Second)
