= Giolla na Naomh mac Muireadhach Mág Samhradháin =

Giolla na Naomh Mág Samhradháin, the First, was chief of the McGovern Clan and Baron or Lord of Tullyhaw barony, County Cavan from c.1148 - 1181.

== Ancestry ==
His ancestry was Giolla na Naomh son of Muireadhach Mág Samhradhán who was the son of Samhradhán mac Conchobhar mac Fearghal mac Flann mac Aonghus mac Conchobhar mac Tadhg Tir mac Ruarc mac Íomhaor mac Cosgrach mac Dúnghal mac Oireachtach mac Eochaidh (Teallach n-Eachach or Tullyhaw is named after the latter)

== Family ==
His son was Giolla Íosa Mág Samhradháin who was chief of the clan from c.1181 – 1231

Preceded by Muireadhach Mág Samhradhán	Chief of McGovern clan 1148–1181 AD	Succeeded by Giolla Íosa Mág Samhradháin
