= Muireadhach mac Samhradhán =

Muireadhach mac Samhradháin, was the first person to bear the surname McGovern and was chief of the McGovern Clan and Baron or Lord of Tullyhaw barony, County Cavan from c.1115 - 1148.

== Ancestry ==
His ancestry was Samhradhán mac Conchobhar mac Fearghal mac Flann mac Aonghus mac Conchobhar mac Tadhg Tir mac Ruarc mac Íomhaor mac Cosgrach mac Dúnghal mac Oireachtach mac Eochaidh (Teallach n-Eachach or Tullyhaw is named after the latter).

== Description ==
Poem 2, stanza 8, by Giolla Pádraig mac Naimhin, written c.1290-1298, in the Book of Magauran describes Muireadhach as stern-faced Muireadhach who sent his warriors patrolling each ford.

== Residence ==
Muireadhach was probably born in Moneensauran townland, Glangevlin, County Cavan, where his father Samhradhán lived. There are three medieval ringforts in the townland, one of which was probably his residence. It is thus the cradle of the McGovern clan, where the first McGovern was born.

== Family ==
His son was Giolla na Naomh mac Muireadhach Mág Samhradháin, head of the lineage from c.1160-1200

Preceded by Samhradhán	Chief of McGovern clan 1115–1148 AD	Succeeded by Giolla na Naomh Mág Samhradháin, the First
