= Brian Breaghach Mág Samhradháin =

Irish clan chief (died 1294)

Brian Breaghach Mág Samhradháin (Mág Samhradháin anglicised as McGovern or Magauran) was chief of the McGovern or Magauran Clan of Tullyhaw in West Bréifne from 1272 to 3 May 1294. Tullyhaw is now a barony in County Cavan.

== Ancestry ==
Brian Breaghach's ancestry was Brian mac Donnchadh Cime (d. 1269) mac Giolla na Naomh (d. 1255) mac Giolla Iosa (d. 1231) mac Giolla na Naomh (fl. 1170) mac Muireadhach (fl. 1130) mac Samhradhan (fl. 1100), who were all previous chiefs of the clan. His mother was May Mór O'Ruairc, the daughter of Amlaíb O'Ruairc, king of West Breifne from 1257–1258. His brothers included Maghnus Mág Samhradháin (who succeeded to the chieftaincy on Brian's death and ruled from 1298 to 1303) and Macraith Mág Samhradháin, the ancestor of two McGovern bishops (Cormac Mác Shamhradháin of Ardagh and Cormac Mág Shamhradháin of Kilmore).

Brian's nickname 'Breaghach' is the adjectival form of Brega, in what is now County Meath. The Book of Magauran states he was called that because he had the three qualities of a High-King of Tara, i.e. gallantry, pride and hospitality. But the actual explanation is he was fostered in Brega as a child, such fosterage resulting in these types of nicknames.

== Head of the Lineage ==
On the death of his father Donnchadh Cime Mág Samhradháin in 1269, Brian's uncle, Tomás Mág Samhradháin, succeeded as chief until his slaying in 1272 in an encounter with the Cenel Luachain clan of Oughteragh parish, barony of Carrigallen, County Leitrim, whereupon Brian took the chieftaincy. Brian avenged his uncle's murder two years later. The Annals of the Four Masters for 1277 state- A great depredation was committed by the people of Eachdhach upon the Kinel-Luachain, in Gleann-da-duile, during which they slew Conor Mac Dorcy, and a host of others. The Annals of Loch Cé for 1277 state- A great depredation was committed by the Tellach-Echach on the Cenel-Duachain, in Glenn-dá-dhuile, on which occasion they slew Conchobhar Mac Dorchaidh, et alii multi. The Annals of Connacht for 1277 state- The Tellach Echach made a great raid on the Cenel Luachain in Glenn da Duile, killing Conchobar Mag Dorchaid and many others.

The 1930s Dúchas folklore collection remembers the incident as- In 1277 Teallach Eochaidh figured prominently in our annals. At that time Fergal McGovern, chief of Tullyhaw, ordered every able-bodied man in his territory to assemble at the hill of Peadar-a-Vohers. From this historic spot he started out for the battlefield of Mohill where he defeated the Leitrim chief, Connor MacDorchaidh. Brian later came under pressure from the O'Reilly clan to the east and the clan Muircheartaigh Uí Conchobhair (O'Conor) to the west. In 1295 the Annals of Connacht state-

The hostages of Brian Mac Samradain and of Gilla Isa Mag Dorchaid were taken by Gilla Isa O Raigillig.

Brian then married off his daughter Gormlaidh to Matha O'Reilly (d. 1301), the son the aforesaid Gilla Isu Ruad mac Domnaill O'Reilly, chief of the O'Reilly's of East Breifne from 1293–1330.

During his reign he assisted the O'Rourkes to capture Cloughoughter Castle from the O'Reillys but the Sheridan clan recaptured it.

== Personal appearance ==
Poems 1, 2, 3, 4 and 6 by Giolla Pádraig mac Naimhin, written c.1290–1298, in the Book of Magauran describe what Brian looked like then. He had blonde curly hair with blue-grey eyes, dark eyebrows and ruddy cheeks. His skin was fair. He wore a diadem on his head, a red cloak and coloured shoes. He played chess. He was fond of poetry and kept a poet's school house at the foot of Cuilcagh mountain. His wife Fionnghuala O'Connor had long blond hair which she wore in plaits. She had a ruddy face with green-blue eyes, dark eyebrows and dark eyelashes. She had small feet and a sweet voice. She wore a scarlet pleated pelisse. Her pastime was embroidering. His consort Maoilmheadha MacTighearnain wore a bright satin robe, over which she wore a purple sash. His warriors wore blued-iron helmets, chain mail and brown cloaks. Their weapons were blued-iron spears and javelins. Their war flags were purple satin.

== Coologe castle ==
Brian's 'castle' was in the townland of Coologe, now in the parish of Templeport, County Cavan. An earthen ringfort now on the shore of Coologe Lough is probably the site of the fortified residence. Poem 1 by Giolla Pádraig mac Naimhin in the Book of Magauran describes what the castle looked like about 1290 A.D. It is described as a strong compact stout castle with interior walls of white hazel-wood which were covered with satin and tapestries. Along the wall were weapon racks with blued-iron spears, javelins and bridles. The door of the castle was ribbed in gold. The palisade outside was bright with berries. In the feast-hall were poets, musicians with harps, a hundred warriors and hounds held by gold-linked chains. The guests drank wine from gem-encrusted gold goblets.

== Death ==
Brian was murdered by the Muircheartaigh Uí Conchobhair branch of the O'Connor royal house of Connacht in 1294 but some annals give a later date.

The Annals of Ulster for the year 1294 state-

Brian Mag Shamradhain the Bregian, chief of Tellaeh-Eathach, was killed by Aed Ua Concobuir the Brefnian and by the Clann-Muircertaigh besides.

The Annals of the Four Masters under the year 1298 state-

Brian Breaghach the Bregian Magauran, Chief of Teallach-Eachdhacih Tullyhaw, was slain by Hugh Breitneach O'Conor, and the Clann-Murtough.

The Annals of Loch Cé under the year 1298 state-

Brian Bregach Mac Shamhradhain, chieftain of Tellach-Echach, the most bountiful and puissant man that was in his own time, was slain by Aedh Breifnech O'Conchobhair and the Clann-Muirchertaigh, in his own house at Cuil-O'Guaire, on the third day of summer.

The Annals of Connacht 1298 state-

Brian Bregach Mag Samradain, chieftain of Tullyhaw, the most generous and valorous man of his time, was killed by Aed Brefnech O Conchobair and the Clan Murtagh in his own house at Coologe on the third day of summer.

Poem 4 in the Book of Magauran laments Brian's death when the castle was burned.

== Family ==
Brian first married Fionnghuala (d.1306), the daughter of Maghnus Ó Conchobair, King of Connacht from 1288–1293. Before she married Brian, Fionnghuala had a poem dedicated to her by Tadhg Mór Ó hÚigínn, her father's tutor and a member of the famous O'Higgins poetic family. Their children were Giolla Íosa (d.1322), Ferghal Ruadh (d.1322) and a daughter Gormlaidh who married Matha O'Reilly (d.1301). Poem 9 in the Book of Magauran is dedicated to Mrs Gormlaidh O'Reilly-McGovern and was written at the time of Matthew O'Reilly's death by the poet Maol Pádraig Mac Naimhin (or Cnáimhín). Fionnghuala died in 1306 according to the Annals of Ulster- Finnghuala, daughter of Maghnus Ua Concobuir, died. The Annals of the Four Masters give her death as 1310- Finola, daughter of Manus O'Conor, died. The Annals of Connacht 1310 state- Findguala daughter of Magnus O Conchobair rested in Christ. The Annals of Loch Cé 1310 state Finnghuala, daughter of Maghnus O'Conchobhair, quievit in Christo. Brian had another consort whom he presumably did not marry (or else he divorced Fionnghuala), Maoilmheadha Mág Tighearnán, the daughter of Gíolla Íosa Mór Mág Tighearnán, chief of the McKiernan Clan of Tullyhunco, County Cavan from c.1269 until his death in 1279. Maoilmheadha is referred to in the Book of Magauran at poems 1, 2, 24, 25 and 29. Gíolla Íosa is mentioned at poem 1 in the same book. Brian's children with Maoilmheadha were Domhnall, Tighearnan, Matha, Donnchadh, Sitriug (d. 1351) and Tomás Mág Samhradháin the Second, who was chief of the clan until his death in 1340. Maoilmheadha died in 1323 according to the Annals of the Four Masters- Maelmeadha, daughter of Mac Tiernan, and wife of Magauran, died.

Preceded by Tomás Mág Samhradháin	Chief of McGovern clan 1272–1294 AD	Succeeded by Maghnus Mág Samhradháin
