= Samhradhán =

Samhradhán, son of Conchobhar, was the progenitor and chief of the McGovern Clan and Baron or Lord of Tullyhaw barony, County Cavan from c.1082 to c.1115. The clan is named after him, Mág Samhradháin, meaning the son of Samhradhán.

== Ancestry ==
His ancestry was Samhradhán mac Conchobhar mac Fearghal mac Flann mac Aonghus mac Conchobhar mac Tadhg Tir mac Ruarc mac Íomhaor mac Cosgrach mac Dúnghal mac Oireachtach mac Eochaidh (Teallach n-Eachach or Tullyhaw is named after the latter).

== Description ==
Poem 2, stanza 9, by Giolla Pádraig mac Naimhin, written c.1290-1298, in the Book of Magauran describe Samhradhán as bright and noble.

== Residence ==
Samhradhán lived in Moneensauran townland, Glangevlin, County Cavan. The townland is named after him (from Irish Moinín Samhradhain, meaning 'Samhradhán's little bog'). There are three medieval ringforts in the townland, one of which was probably his residence. It is thus the cradle of the McGovern clan, where the first McGovern was born, Muireadhach MágSamhradhán.

== Family ==
His son was Muireadhach Mág Samhradhán who ruled from c.1115-c.1148 (i.e. he was the first chief to bear the name Mág Samhradháin or McGovern).

Preceded by none	Chief of McGovern clan 1082–1115 AD	Succeeded by Muireadhach Mág Samhradhán
