= Holy Cross Abbey =

- Mainistir na Croise Naofa
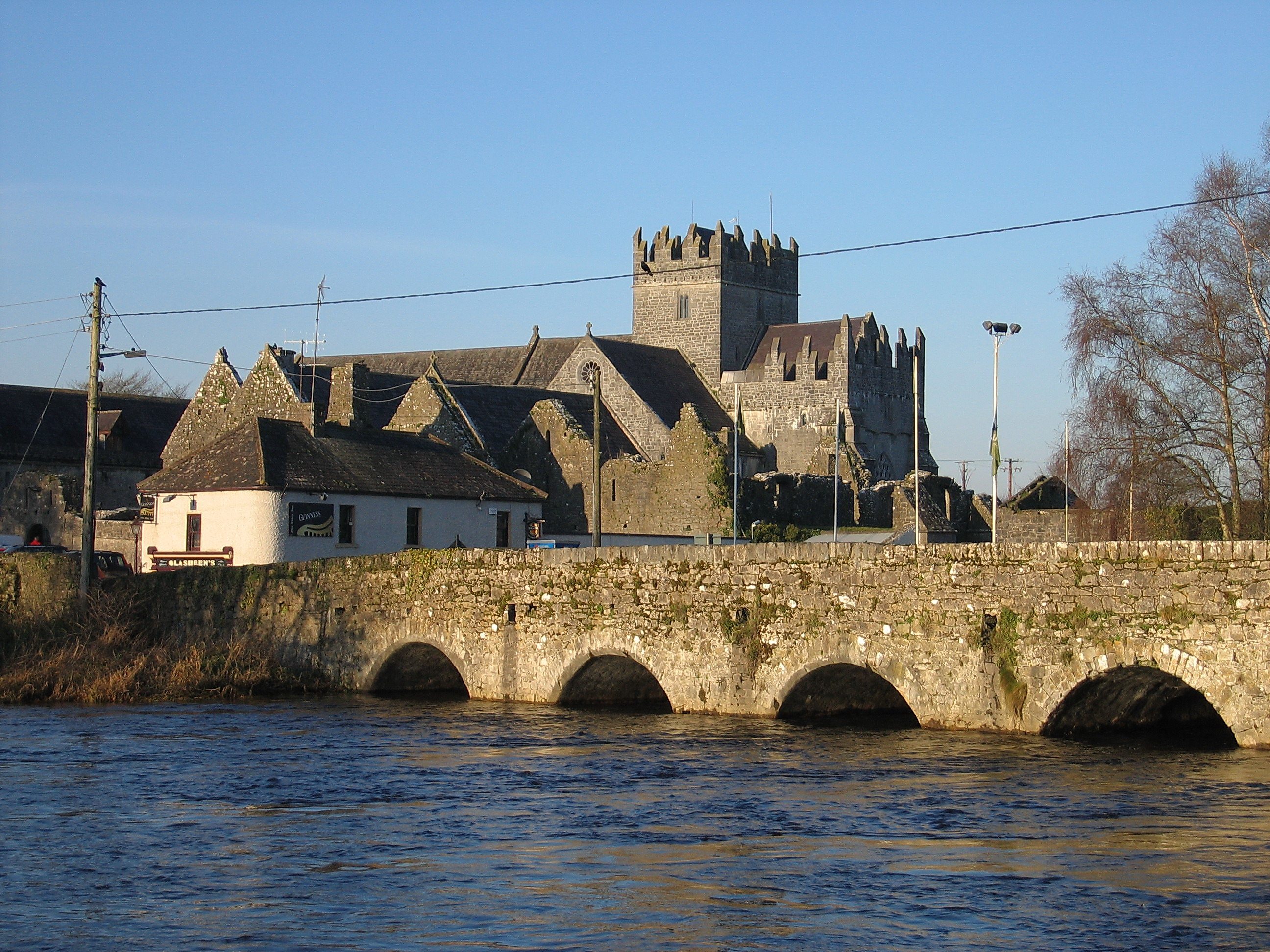
- Holy Cross Abbey on the River Suir

- Location within Ireland
- 52°38′21″N 07°52′05″W
- Location: Holycross, County Tipperary, Ireland
- Denomination: Roman Catholic
- Religious institute: Cistercians
- Website: holycrossabbey.ie

History
- Status: Active as parochial church
- Founded: 1169 (857 years ago)
- Founder: Domnall Mór Ua Briain

Architecture
- Heritage designation: National Monument
- Style: Cistercian

Administration
- Diocese: Roman Catholic Archdiocese of Cashel and Emly

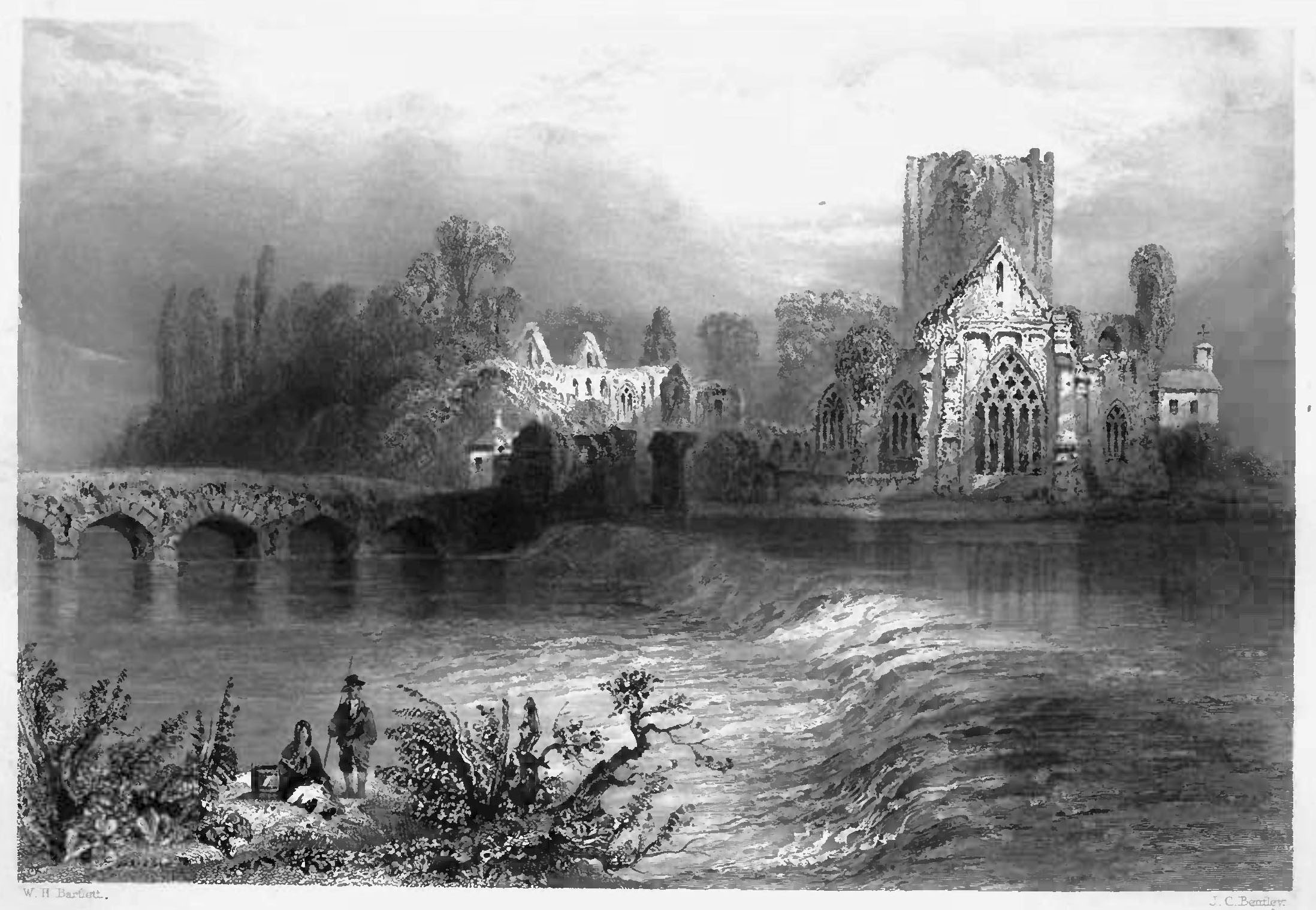
View from 1841

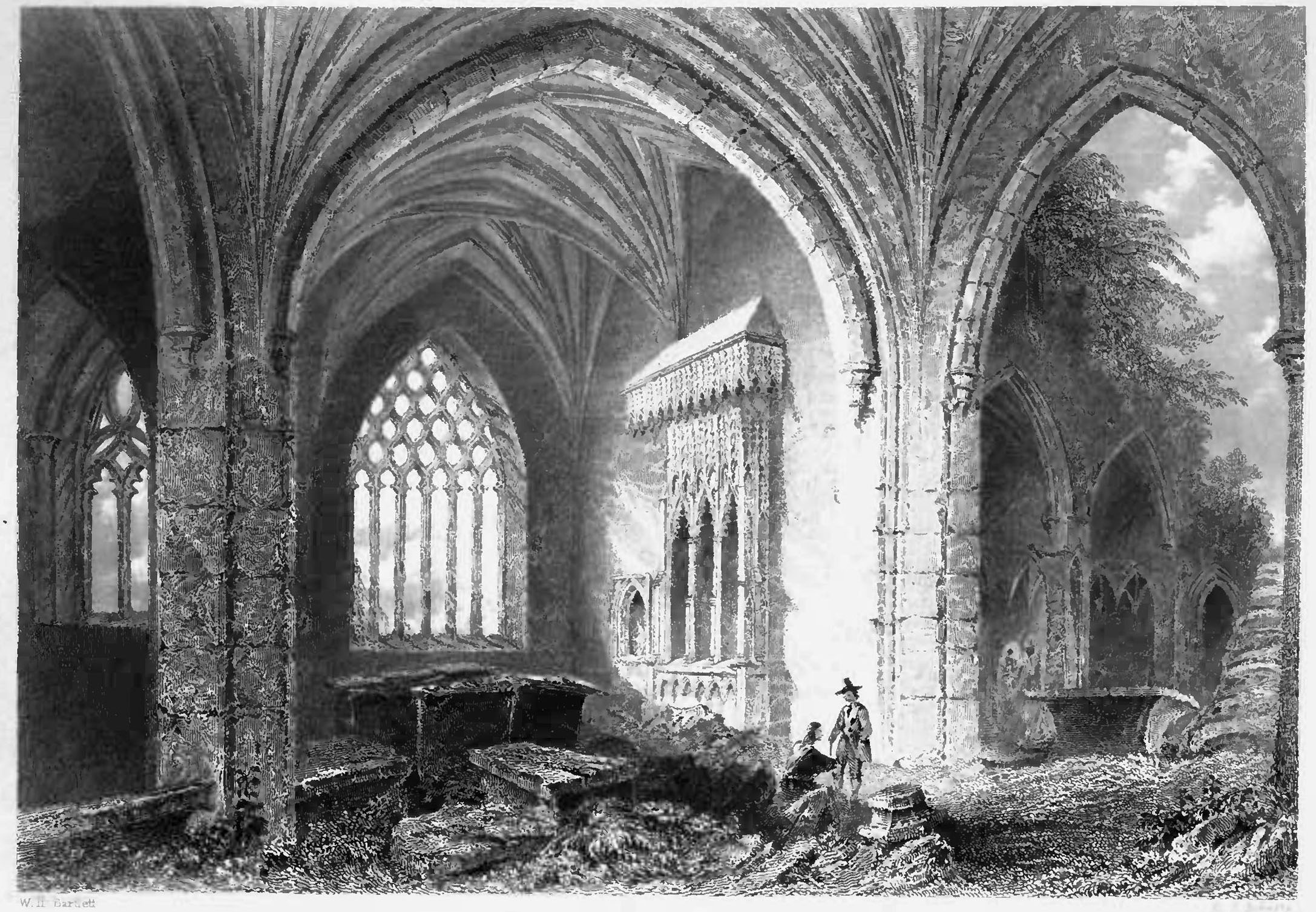
The ruined interior, 1841

Holy Cross Abbey (Mainistir na Croise Naofa) was a Cistercian monastery in Holycross near Thurles, County Tipperary, Ireland, situated on the River Suir. It takes its name from a relic of the True Cross or Holy Rood.

== History ==
A supposed fragment of the True Cross was brought to Ireland by the Plantagenet Queen Isabella of Angoulême, around 1233. She was the widow of King John and bestowed the relic on the original Cistercian Monastery in Thurles founded in 1169 by King Donal O'Brien of Thomond, which she then rebuilt.

With time, Holy Cross Abbey and the sacred relic of the True Cross became a place of medieval pilgrimage, and with the Protestant Reformation, also a rallying-point for victims of religious persecution. As a symbol and inspiration of the Catholic Church in Ireland, resistance, and allegedly of the struggle for Irish independence, it drew a complaint by Sir Henry Sidney, Lord Lieutenant of Ireland, to Queen Elizabeth I in 1567.

Furthermore, one of the most celebrated of the 24 officially recognized Irish Catholic Martyrs, Blessed Dermot O'Hurley, the fugitive Roman Catholic Archbishop of Cashel, went on pilgrimage to Holy Cross Abbey in September 1583, shortly before his arrest by the priest hunters and 1584 execution by hanging outside the city walls of Dublin.

The Annals of the Kingdom of Ireland records a 1601 pilgrimage to Holy Cross Abbey by Irish clan chief Hugh Roe O'Donnell, Lord of Tyrconnell. True to his clan's coat of arms and the Constantinian motto of the House of O'Donnell (In Hoc Signo Vinces) and, in anticipation of the coming Battle of Kinsale, O'Donnell venerated the relic of the True Cross at Holy Cross Abbey on St. Andrew's Day, 30 November 1601. By that period, the Abbey had become a rallying point for resistance to the religious persecution of the Catholic Church in Ireland and for the rising of the Irish clans as part of the ongoing Nine Years War. From there, O'Donnell sent an expedition to Ardfert, to win a quick victory and successfully recover the territory of his ally, Thomas Fitzmaurice, 18th Baron Kerry, who had lost it and his 9-year-old son to Sir Charles Wilmot. It was to be O'Donnell's last victory before the defeat at Kinsale.

The Holy Rood was last exposed for public veneration in 1632 and following the Cromwellian conquest of Ireland, Holy Cross Abbey fell into ruins. Local people used the roofless ruins as a burial place after 1740. It became a scheduled national monument in 1880, with orders that the ruins were, "to be preserved and not used as a place of worship".

Special legislation in the Dáil for the founding's 500th anniversary, 21 January 1969, enabled Holy Cross Abbey to be restored as a place of Catholic worship, exceptionally for a national monument. The Sacristan of St. Peter's Basilica in the Vatican provided an authenticated relic of the Holy Cross, and the emblem of the Jerusalem Cross, or Crusader Cross, has been restored for the Abbey.

Two crosses were stolen, including the cross containing the relics of the true cross, in a robbery on the Abbey on 11 October 2011. A portable angle grinder, hammer, and screwdriver were used by the masked raiders to remove the relics. In January 2012, it was announced that the relics had been recovered by An Garda Siochana, relatively undamaged, and returned to the Abbey.

== Gallery ==
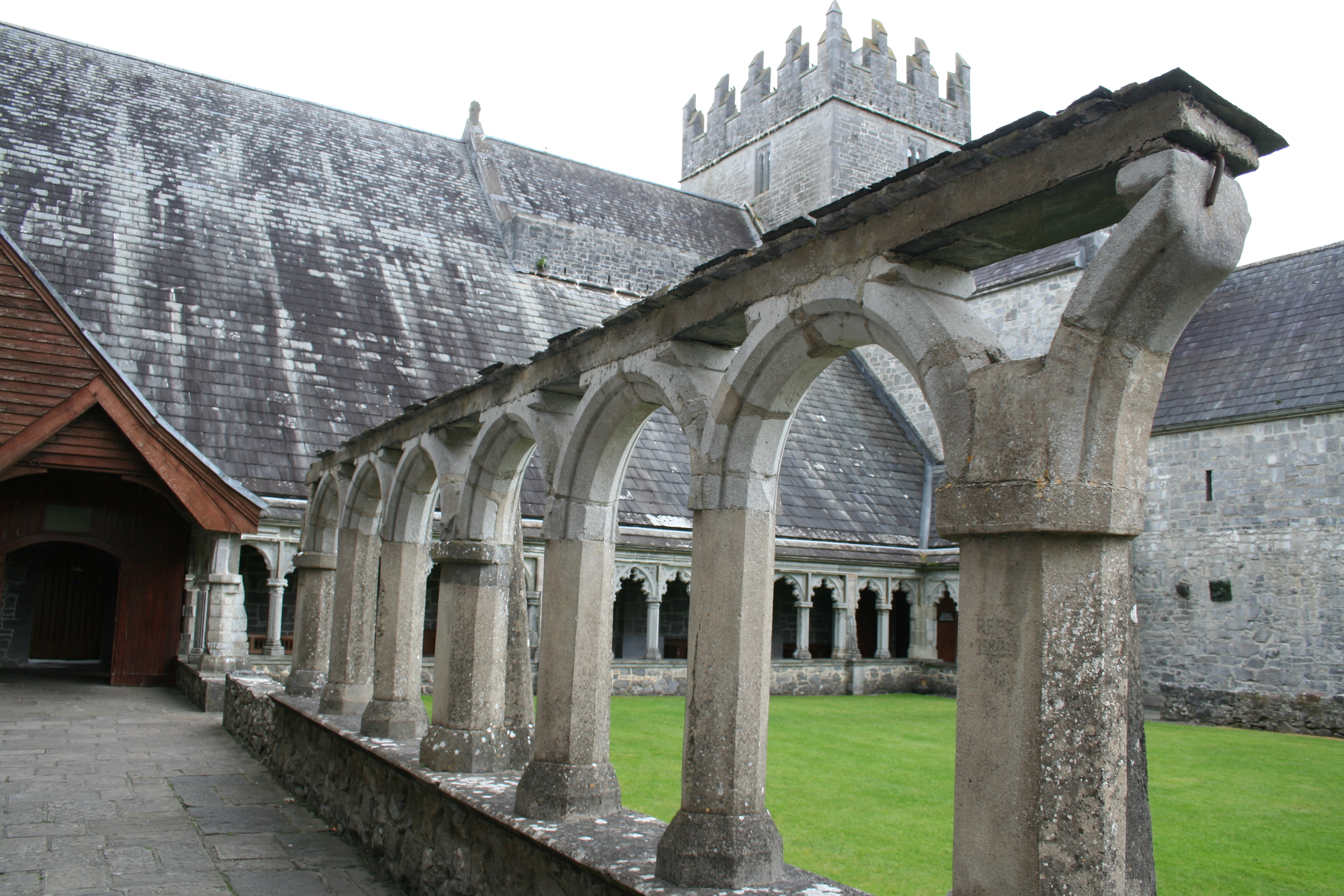

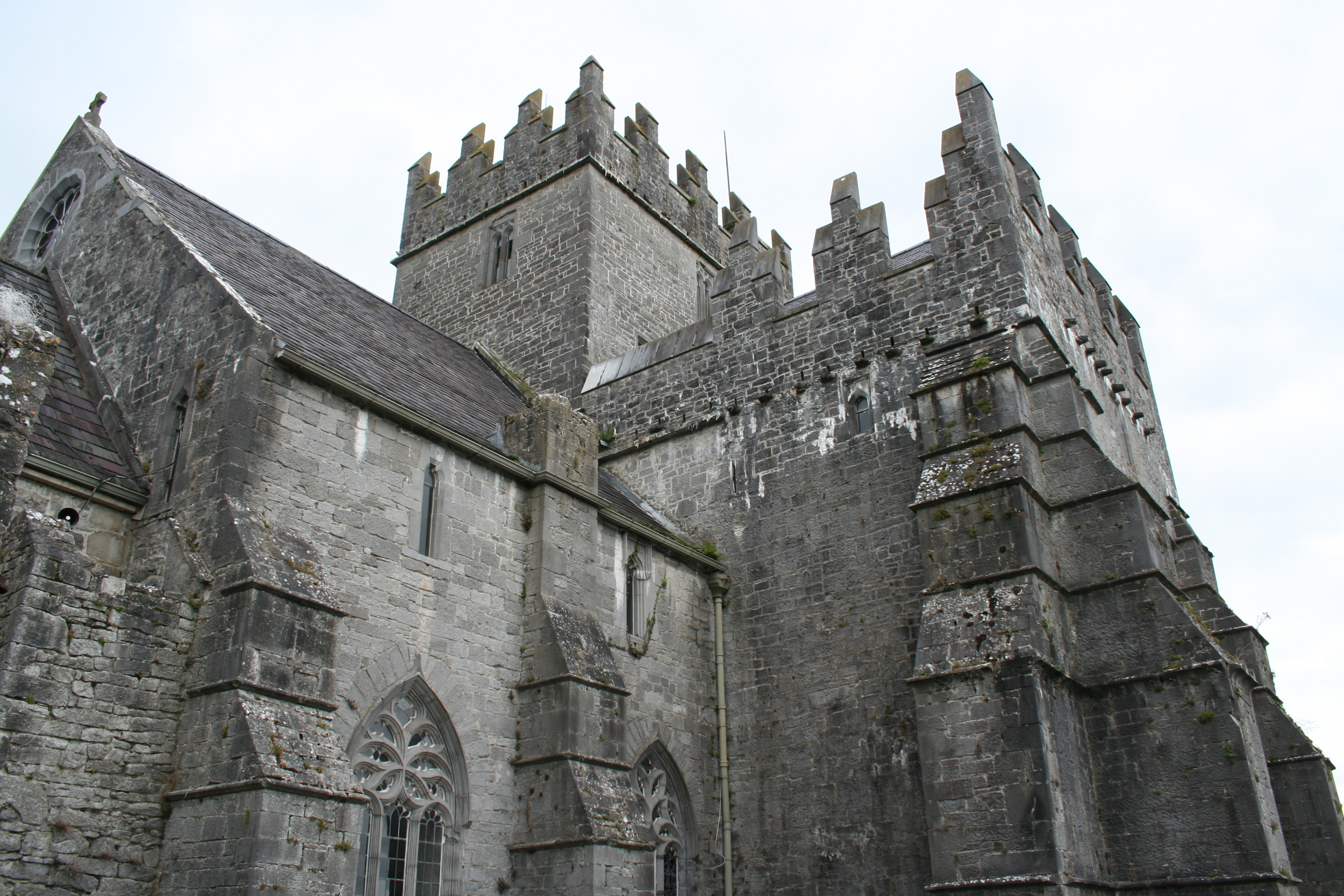

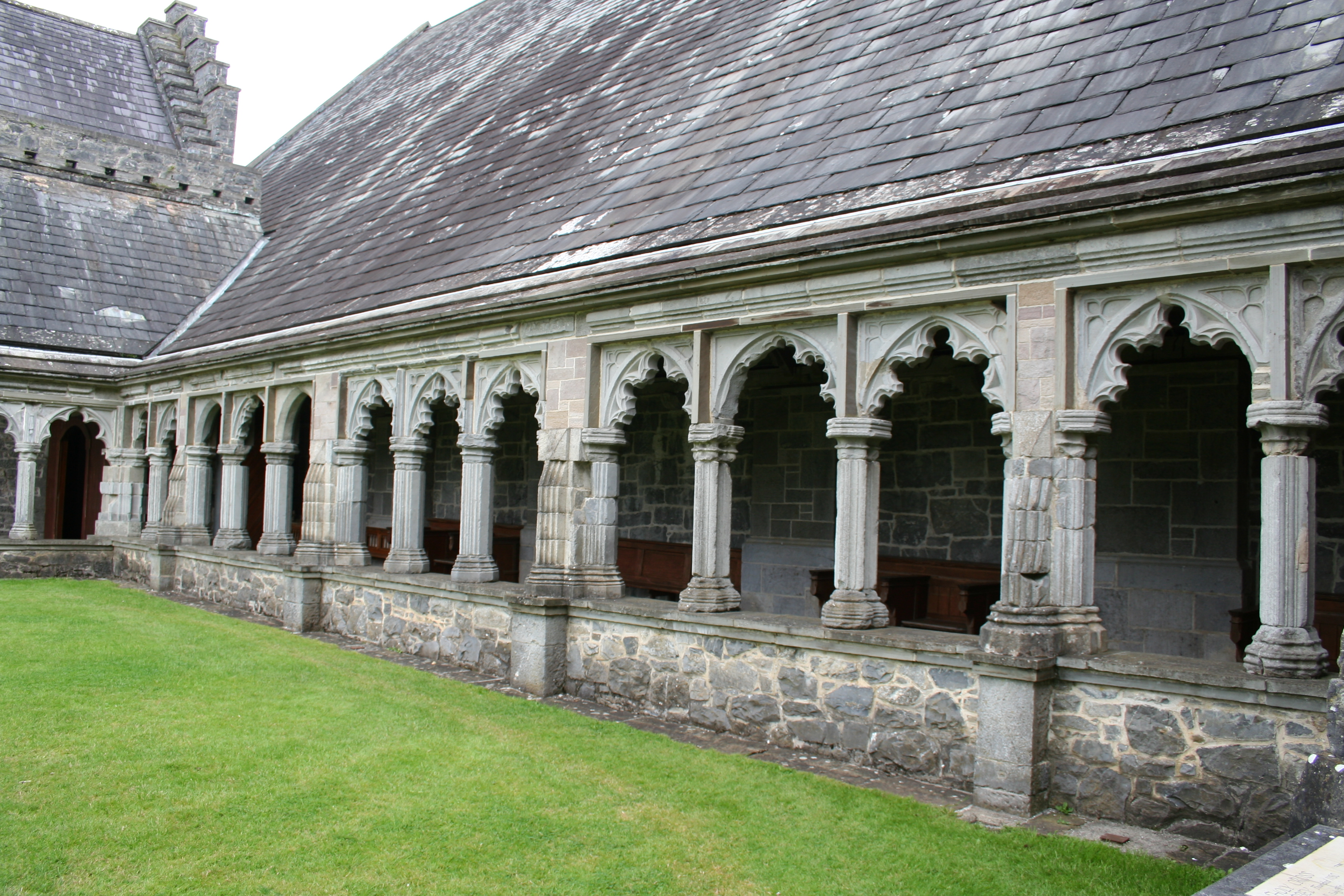

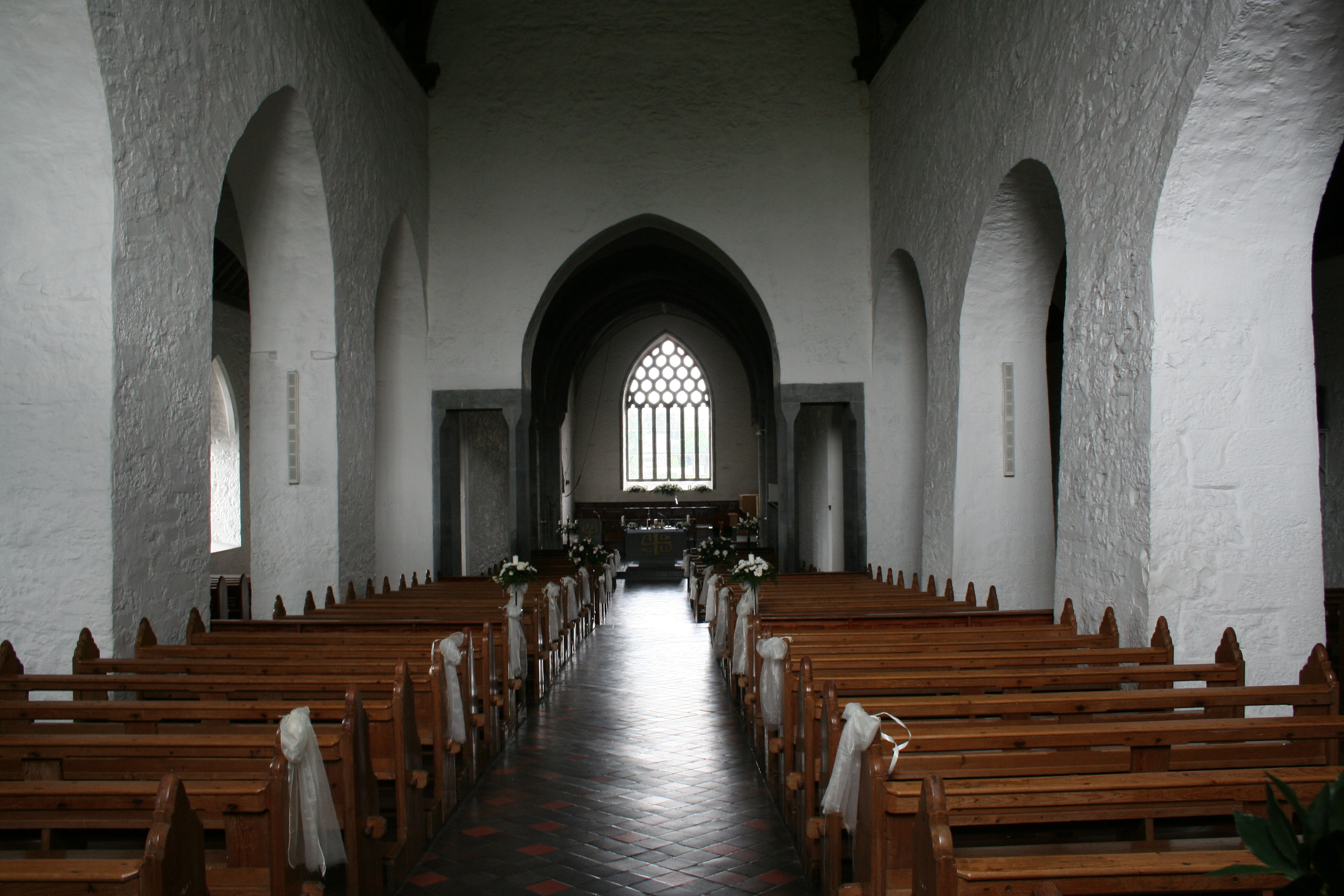

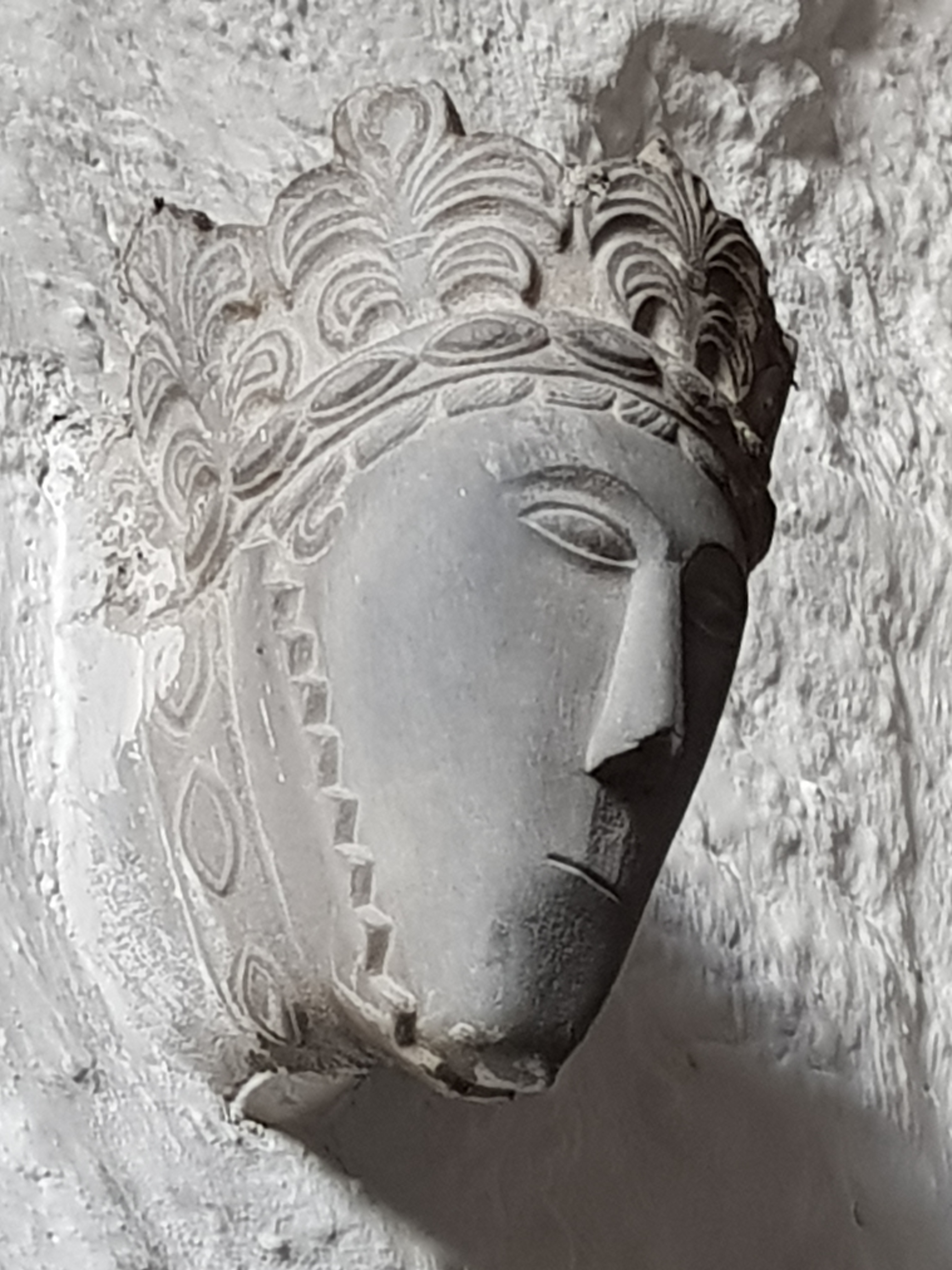

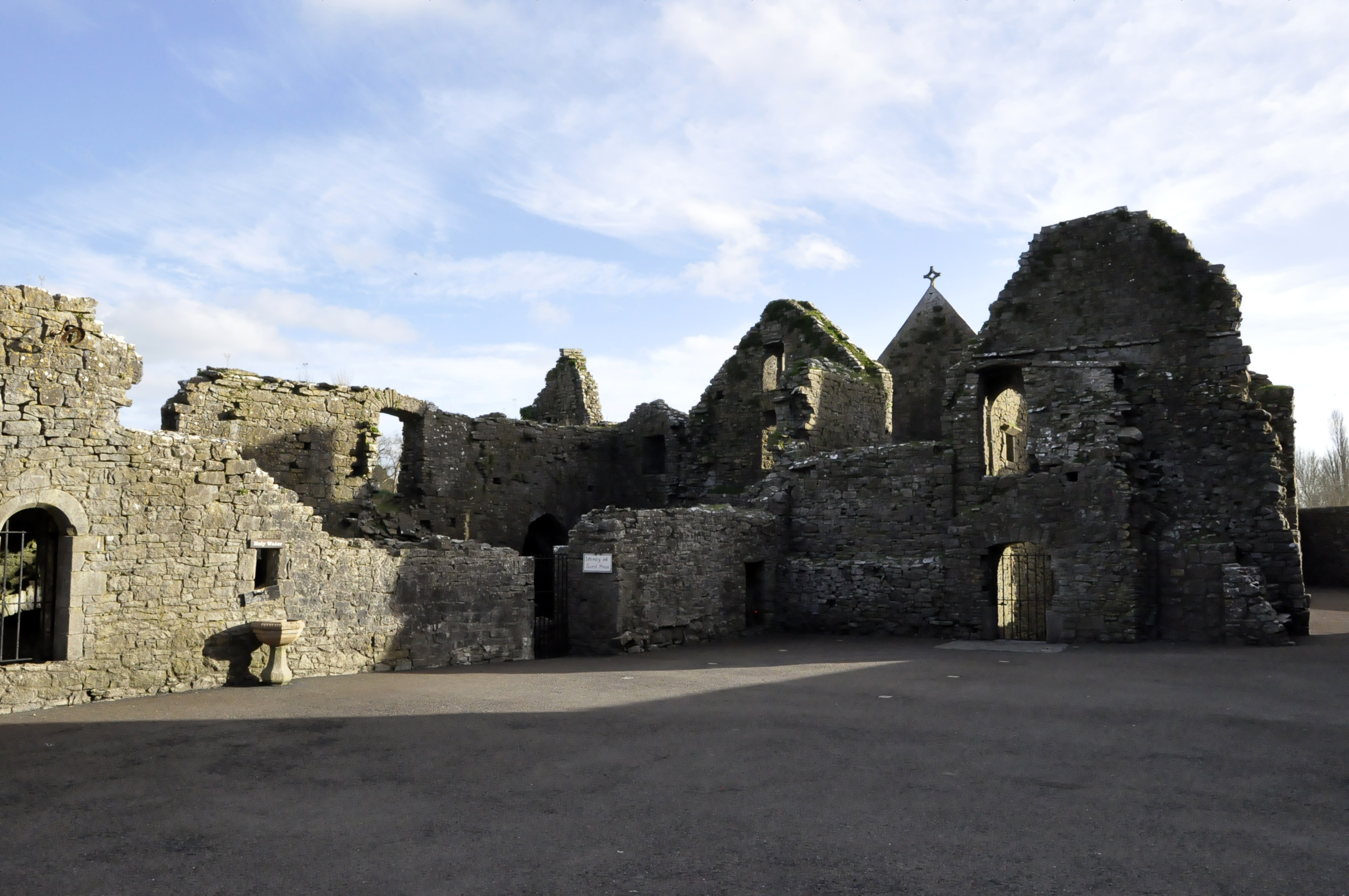

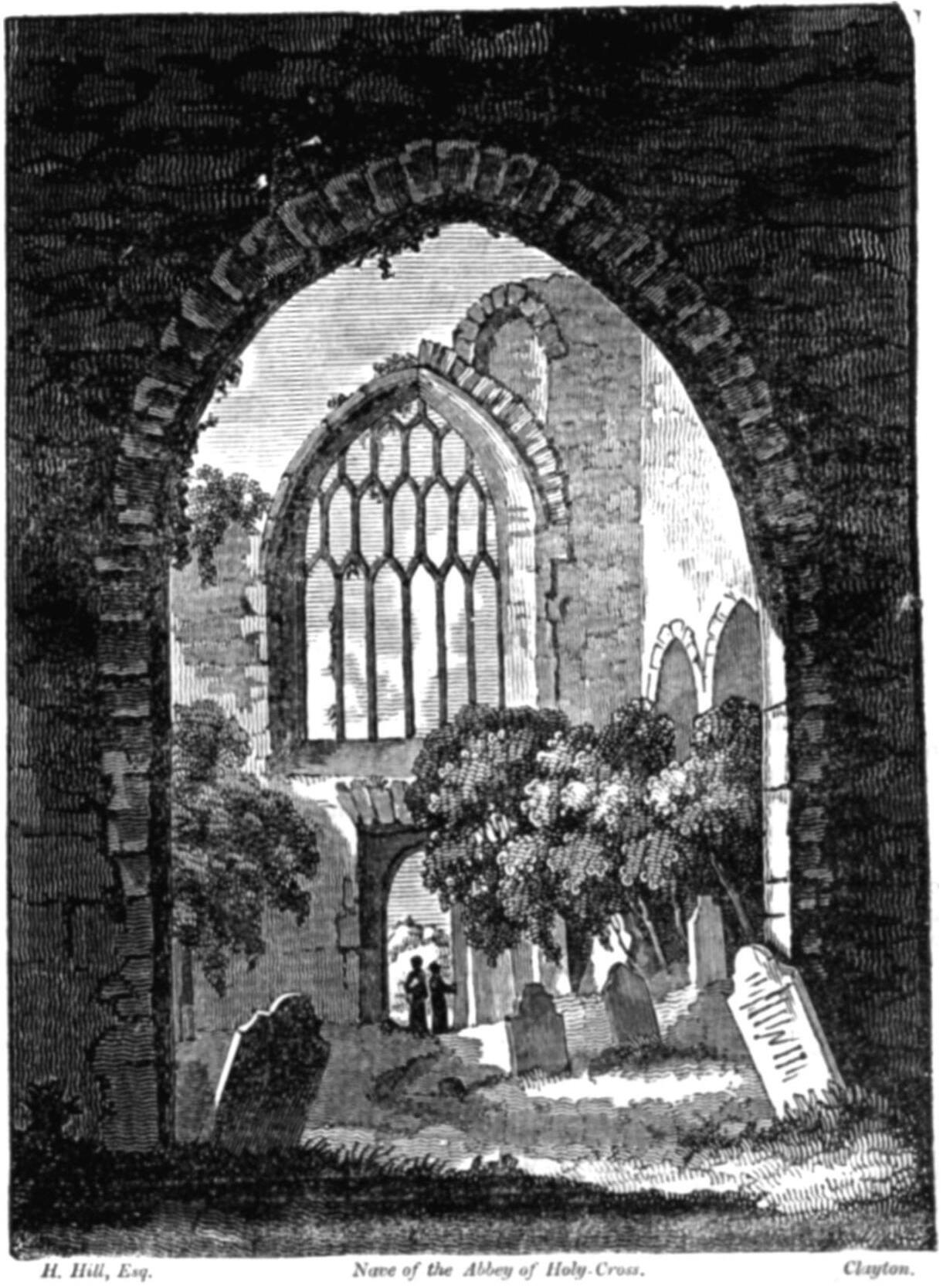
1832

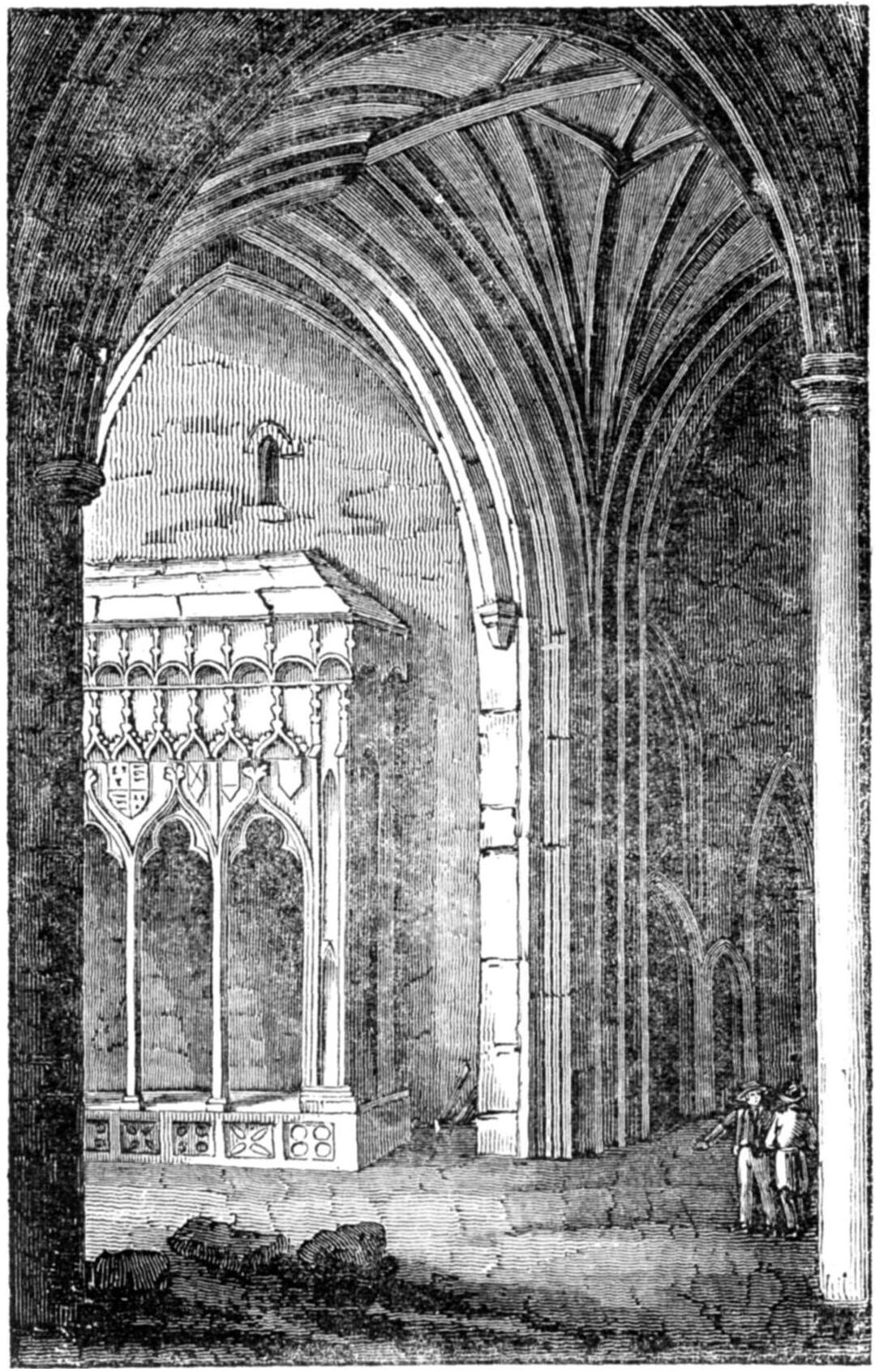
1834

== Transport ==
The Thurles to Clonmel via Cashel bus route serves Holycross. The nearest railway station is Thurles railway station approximately 6 km distant.

== See also ==
- List of abbeys and priories in Ireland
