= 1640 in Ireland =

- Centuries: 15th; 16th; 17th; 18th; 19th
- Decades: 1620s; 1630s; 1640s; 1650s; 1660s
- See also: Other events of 1640; List of years in Ireland

Events from the year 1640 in Ireland.

== Incumbent ==
- Monarch: Charles I

== Events ==
- 5 December – John Atherton, Church of Ireland Bishop of Waterford and Lismore, and his proctor are executed on a charge of buggery, on Saint Stephen's Green, Dublin.
- Approximate date – Dubhaltach Mac Fhirbhisigh transcribes the only surviving copy of the Chronicon Scotorum.

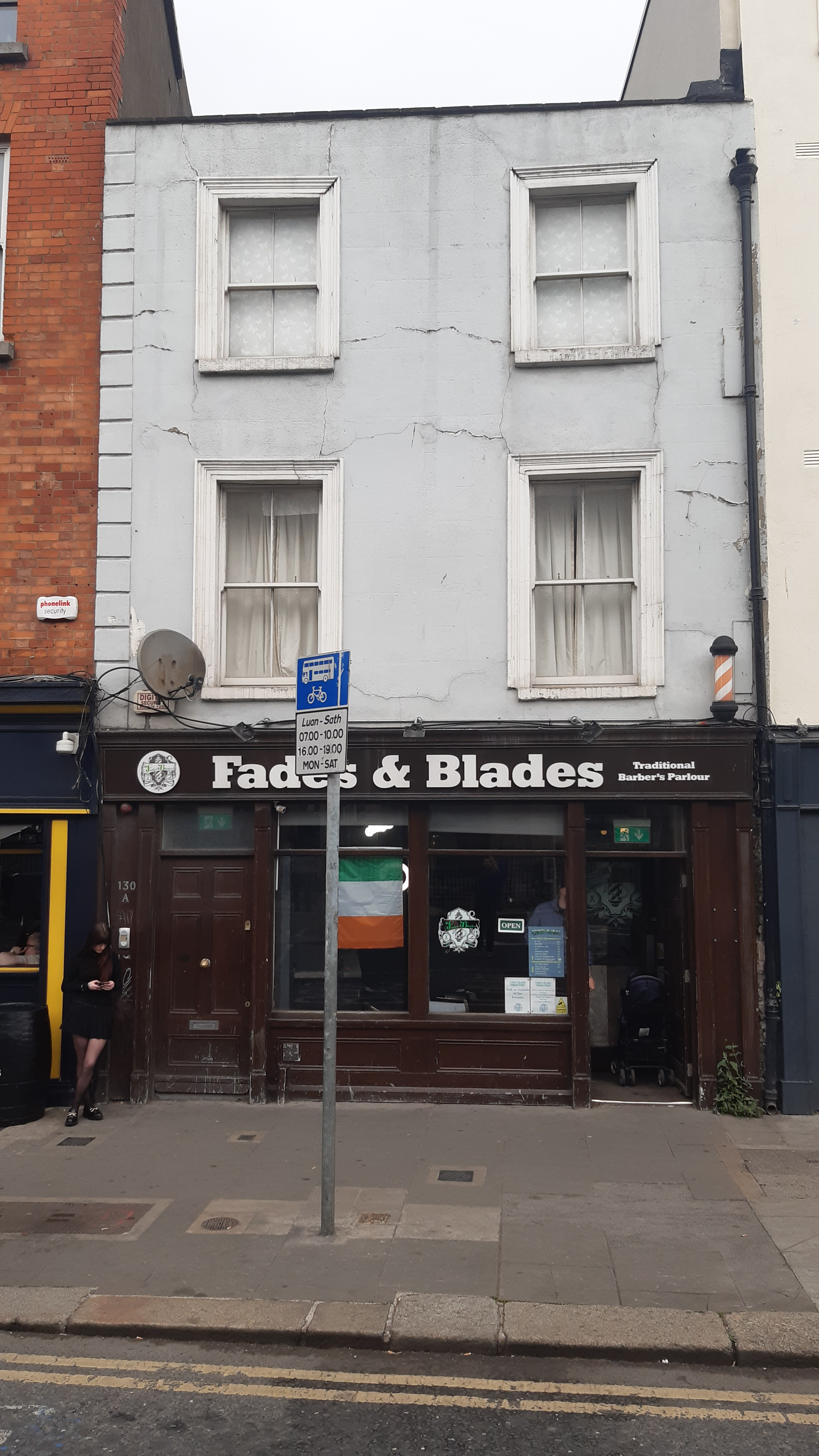
130 Thomas Street, built c.1640, is the oldest domestic dwelling in Dublin

- The building at 130 Thomas Street, Dublin was erected, which (as of 2020) remained the earliest-known domestic dwelling to have survived in Dublin city. Radio-carbon dating of the structural timbers indicated felling dates in the spring of 1639. As oak needs to be used within six months of being felled, it can be inferred that the timber frame of the house was constructed in 1639 or 1640.

== Arts and literature ==
- 17 March (Saint Patrick's Day) – Henry Burnell's play Landgartha premieres at the Werburgh Street Theatre in Dublin. It is one of the earliest dramatic works from a native Irish playwright.
- James Shirley's play Saint Patrick for Ireland is published. The author returns to England around 16 April.

== Births ==
- 29 June – Elizabeth Stanhope, Countess of Chesterfield (d. 1665 in England)
- Thomas Beecher, politician and soldier (d. 1709)
- Charles Molloy, lawyer (d. 1690)
- Approximate date
  - Thomas Knox, politician (d. 1728)
  - Philip Og O'Reilly, politician (d. 1703)

== Deaths ==
- 5 December – John Atherton, Bishop of Waterford and Lismore (b. 1598)
