= 1617 in Ireland =

- Centuries: 15th; 16th; 17th; 18th; 19th
- Decades: 1590s; 1600s; 1610s; 1620s; 1630s
- See also: Other events of 1617; List of years in Ireland

Events from the year 1617 in Ireland.

== Incumbent ==
- Monarch: James I

== Events ==
- 8 May – title of Baron Hamilton of Strabane in the County of Tyrone created in the Peerage of Ireland for the 13-year-old James Hamilton, Master of Abercorn.
- June – Contention of the bards: Teige MacDaire in a letter to Lughaidh Ó Cléirigh and the northern poets proposes a decisive face-to-face poetic disputation.
- 19 August – Sir Walter Ralegh's last expedition sets out from County Cork to cross to South America.
- 17 October – proclamation ordering banishment of Roman Catholic priests educated abroad.
- The De Barry family moves from Barryscourt Castle near Carrigtwohill to Barrymore Castle in Castlelyons.
- Barnabe Rich publishes The Irish Hubbub, or the English Hue and Crie.

== Births ==
- approx. date
  - Roger Boyle, Church of Ireland bishop (d. 1687)
  - Hezekiah Holland ('Anglo-Hibernus'), Anglican clergyman (d. after 1660)

== Deaths ==
- 29 January – William Butler, alchemist (b. c.1534)
- 10 April – David de Barry, 5th Viscount Buttevant, peer
- 10 November – Barnabe Rich, English soldier and writer (b. c.1540)
- Aonghus Ruadh na nAor Ó Dálaigh, poet (b. 1550) (murdered)
- Eochaidh Ó hÉoghusa, poet (b. 1567)
