= Geoffrey Baron =

Geoffrey Baron may refer to:

- Geoffrey Baron (priest), Australian dean
- Geoffrey Baron (rebel) (1607–1651), Irish rebel
- Jeff Baron, American playwright and screenwriter

== See also ==
- Geoffrey Barron (disambiguation)
