= 1632 in Ireland =

- Centuries: 15th; 16th; 17th; 18th; 19th
- Decades: 1610s; 1620s; 1630s; 1640s; 1650s
- See also: Other events of 1632; List of years in Ireland

Events from the year 1632 in Ireland.

== Incumbent ==
- Monarch: Charles I

== Events ==
- September 8 – Government order for the destruction of St Patrick's Purgatory in Lough Derg, County Donegal, carried out on 25 October.
- Compilation of the Annals of the Four Masters begins at Donegal.
- Peter Lombard's De Regno Hiberniae sanctorum insula commentarius is published at Louvain.

== Deaths ==
- November 30 – Émonn Ó Braonain, subject of a verse lament.
- Domhnall Spainneach Mac Murrough Caomhanach; the last king of Leinster.
- John Rider, Latin lexicographer and Anglican Bishop of Killaloe from 1612 to 1632 (b. 1562)
- Richard Tyrrell
- Approximate date – Somhairle Mac Domhnail, soldier.
