= 1616 in Ireland =

- Centuries: 15th; 16th; 17th; 18th; 19th
- Decades: 1590s; 1600s; 1610s; 1620s; 1630s
- See also: Other events of 1616; List of years in Ireland

Events from the year 1616 in Ireland.

== Incumbent ==
- Monarch: James I

== Events ==
- February – Arthur Chichester, 1st Baron Chichester's term as Lord Deputy of Ireland is terminated. He has served since 1605.
- July 2 – Sir Oliver St John is appointed Lord Deputy of Ireland. He served until 1622.

== Deaths ==
- July 20 – Hugh O'Neill, 2nd Earl of Tyrone, led the resistance during the Nine Years War (b. c 1540).
