= 1593 in Ireland =

- Centuries: 14th; 15th; 16th; 17th; 18th
- Decades: 1570s; 1580s; 1590s; 1600s; 1610s
- See also: Other events of 1593; List of years in Ireland

Events from the year 1593 in Ireland.

== Incumbent ==
- Monarch: Elizabeth I

== Events ==
- 14 June – English explorer John Davis in the Desire makes landfall at Berehaven at the conclusion of the second Cavendish expedition.
- 23 June – in a skirmish at Skeanavart in County Roscommon as part of Hugh Maguire (Lord of Fermanagh)'s raid into Connacht, Edmund MacGauran (Roman Catholic Archbishop of Armagh) is among those killed.
- Hugh Roe O'Donnell drives the English sheriff out of Tyrconnell and leads two expeditions against Turlough Luineach O'Neill.
- Pirate queen Grace O'Malley meets with Queen Elizabeth I of England at Greenwich.
- In Lisbon, John Houling, SJ, and Fr. Peter Fonseca establish the College of St. Patrick for the education of young Irish Roman Catholics.

== Births ==
- Thomas Arthur, physician (d. 1666?)
- Thomas Fleming, Roman Catholic Archbishop of Dublin (d. 1665)

== Deaths ==
- 4 March – Sir William Herbert, Welsh planter in Ireland.
- 23 June – Edmund MacGauran, Roman Catholic Archbishop of Armagh (b. c.1547)
- Edward Fitz-Symon, Attorney General for Ireland (b. c.1530)
- Murrough na dTuadh Ó Flaithbheartaigh, Chief of Iar Connacht.
