= 1630 in Ireland =

- Centuries: 15th; 16th; 17th; 18th; 19th
- Decades: 1610s; 1620s; 1630s; 1640s; 1650s
- See also: Other events of 1630; List of years in Ireland

Events from the year 1630 in Ireland.

== Incumbent ==
- Monarch: Charles I

== Events ==
- Lismore Cathedral is destroyed.
- Mícheál Ó Cléirigh's Félire na naomh nÉrennach ("Calendar of Irish Saints" or "Martyrology of Donegal") is completed.

== Births ==
- Richard Talbot, 1st Earl of Tyrconnell, soldier (d. 1691)
- Nicholas Ward, politician (d. after 1666)
- Approximate date
  - Alexander Fitton, lawyer and politician (d. 1698)
  - John Keating, judge (d. 1691, committed suicide)
  - Hugh Reily, lawyer and politician (d. 1695)

== Deaths ==
- February 20 – James "Spanish" Blake, spy (b. after 1560)
- June 3 – Thomas Fitzmaurice, 18th Baron Kerry, soldier (b. 1574)
- Approximate date – Lughaidh Ó Cléirigh, poet and historian (b. before 1603)
