= Charles Molloy =

Charles Molloy may refer to:

- Charles Molloy (journalist) (died 1767), Irish journalist, political activist and minor playwright
- Charles Molloy (lawyer) (1640–1690), Irish lawyer known as a writer on maritime law
