= 1636 in Ireland =

- Centuries: 15th; 16th; 17th; 18th; 19th
- Decades: 1610s; 1620s; 1630s; 1640s; 1650s
- See also: Other events of 1636; List of years in Ireland

Events from the year 1636 in Ireland.

== Incumbent ==
- Monarch: Charles I

== Events ==
- May 27–28 – cross-examination of a Galway jury on a charge of refusing to find the king's title to land, resulting in heavy fines and imprisonment until the jury submits in December.
- May 31 – proclamation regulating the production of linen yarn.
- August 12 – following a public disputation in Belfast, Henry Leslie, Church of Ireland Bishop of Down and Connor, sentences Edward Brice, Henry Calvert, James Hamilton, John Ridge and one other non-subscribing Presbyterian minister to silence.
- Compilation of the Annals of the Four Masters is completed by Mícheál Ó Cléirigh, assisted by Cú Choigcríche Ó Cléirigh, Fearfeasa Ó Maol Chonaire and Peregrine Ó Duibhgeannain, in the Franciscan friary in Donegal Town under the patronage of Fearghal Ó Gadhra.
- Ballyhornan is founded in County Down.

== Arts and literature ==
- May – London playwright James Shirley moves to work for four years under John Ogilby at the new Werburgh Street Theatre in Dublin, the first in Ireland.

== Births ==
- Richard Coote, 1st Earl of Bellomont, governor in the British North American colonies (d. 1701)
- Richard Nagle, lawyer and politician (d. 1699)
- Máel Ísa Ó Raghallaigh, harper

== Deaths ==
- December 10 – Randal MacDonnell, 1st Earl of Antrim, peer
- Dominick Sarsfield, 1st Viscount Sarsfield, lawyer (b. c.1570)
- Brockhill Taylor, landowner and politician
