= 1610 in Ireland =

- Centuries: 15th; 16th; 17th; 18th; 19th
- Decades: 1590s; 1600s; 1610s; 1620s; 1630s
- See also: Other events of 1610; List of years in Ireland

Events from the year 1610 in Ireland.

== Incumbent ==
- Monarch: James I

== Events ==
- Plantations of Ireland in the north of County Wexford, on lands confiscated from the MacMurrough-Kavanagh clan; and in County Cavan by William Bailie, who begins construction of Bailieborough Castle, and Stephen Butler, who begins establishment of an urban centre at Belturbet.
- Construction of Antrim Castle is begun.
- Poet and historian Geoffrey Keating (Seathrún Céitinn) is appointed by the Catholic Church to the cure of souls at Uachtar Achaidh in the parish of Knockgraffon, near Cahir, County Tipperary.
- Barnabe Rich publishes A New Description of Ireland.

== Births ==
- 19 October – James Butler, 1st Duke of Ormonde, Anglo-Irish statesman and soldier (d. 1688)
- Bonaventure Baron, Franciscan theologian (d. 1696)
- John Bathe, Jesuit (d. 1649)
- Guildford Slingsby, politician (d. 1643)

== Deaths ==
- Approximate date – Patrick Walsh, merchant, ambassador and friar (b. before 1580)
