= 1635 in Ireland =

- Centuries: 15th; 16th; 17th; 18th; 19th
- Decades: 1610s; 1620s; 1630s; 1640s; 1650s
- See also: Other events of 1635; List of years in Ireland

Events from the year 1635 in Ireland.

== Incumbent ==
- Monarch: Charles I

== Events ==
- January 28–February 28 – a Star Chamber trial finds the City of London and Irish Society guilty of mismanagement of the plantation of Londonderry: it is fined £70,000 and obliged to surrender the Londonderry charter.
- March 25 – Hailstones four inches (10 cm) in diameter fall at Castletown, south of Ballycumber.
- April 14 – English adventurer John Clavell, practising as a doctor in Ireland at this time, marries a young Dublin heiress.
- April 18 – the Parliament of Ireland passes an act requiring ale sellers to be licensed by magistrates; "An Act against Plowing by the Tayle, and pulling the Wooll off living Sheep"; and an act providing for the erection of houses of correction.
- August 16 – a Galway jury refuses to find the king's title to land, juries in counties Roscommon, Sligo and Mayo having found for the king during the previous month.

== Deaths ==
- November 8 – Aodh Buidhe Mac an Bhaird, writer, historian and hagiographer (b. c. 1593)
