= 1611 in Ireland =

- Centuries: 15th; 16th; 17th; 18th; 19th
- Decades: 1590s; 1600s; 1610s; 1620s; 1630s
- See also: Other events of 1611; List of years in Ireland

Events from the year 1611 in Ireland.

== Incumbent ==
- Monarch: James I

== Events ==
- 18 February – Sir Humphrey Winch, retiring Lord Chief Justice of Ireland, is sent to London with draft legislation.
- 7 May – surrender and regrant in Counties Carlow, Wexford and Wicklow is authorised.
- June – Roman Catholic priest Patrick O'Loughran returns from exile.
- 11 July – 21 October: Lord Carew is in Ireland (as authorised in June) to inquire into its government and report on prospects for the plantation of Ulster (August).
- 19 August – the Church of Ireland Bishop of Elphin, John Lynch, resigns, declaring himself a Roman Catholic, and is succeeded by Edward King (consecrated December).
- 25 November – the nobility and gentry claim the right to have advance sight of bills intended for the Parliament of Ireland.
- Giolla Brighde Ó hEoghusa (Bonaventura Ó hEoghusa or O'Hussey)'s An Teagasc Criosdaidhe is published in Antwerp, the first devotional work in Irish.

== Births ==
- Richard Lynch, Jesuit theologian (d. 1676)
- Hugh Dubh O'Neill, 5th Earl of Tyrone, soldier (d. 1660) (born in Brussels)
