= 1591 in Ireland =

- Centuries: 14th; 15th; 16th; 17th; 18th
- Decades: 1570s; 1580s; 1590s; 1600s; 1610s
- See also: Other events of 1591; List of years in Ireland

Events from the year 1591 in Ireland.

== Incumbent ==
- Monarch: Elizabeth I

== Events ==
- February – Brian O'Rourke, rebel lord of West Bréifne, seeks right of asylum in the Kingdom of Scotland.
- 20 March – Seamus Ó hÉilidhe is appointed Roman Catholic Archbishop of Tuam.
- 3 April – Brian O'Rourke is arrested in Glasgow and delivered to the English.
- 3 November – O'Rourke is hanged at Tyburn. His son, Brian Oge O'Rourke, succeeds as lord.
- November – Barnabe Riche proposes action against Roman Catholic recusants.
- 26 December – Hugh Roe O'Donnell escapes from Dublin Castle but is recaptured within days.
- Early 1591–Autumn 1592 – Edmund MacGauran, Roman Catholic Archbishop of Armagh, travels in Spain and Portugal seeking financial and military assistance for an uprising in Ireland.
- Hugh O'Neill, Earl of Tyrone, elopes with Mabel, sister of Henry Bagenal, Provincial President of Ulster.

== Births ==
- Michael Wadding, Jesuit theologian and missionary priest (d. 1644)

== Deaths ==
- Early? – Sir Nicholas Bagenal, marshal of the army in Ireland (b. 1509/10)
- 3 November – Brian O'Rourke, lord of West Bréifne (b. 1540?) (hanged)
- Tadhg Dall Ó hÚigínn, poet (b. c.1550)
