= 1599 in Ireland =

- Centuries: 14th; 15th; 16th; 17th; 18th
- Decades: 1570s; 1580s; 1590s; 1600s; 1610s
- See also: Other events of 1599; List of years in Ireland

Events from the year 1599 in Ireland.

== Incumbent ==
- Monarch: Elizabeth I

== Events ==
- March 12 – Robert Devereux, 2nd Earl of Essex, is appointed Lord Lieutenant of Ireland by Queen Elizabeth I of England.
- March 27 – Essex leaves London with a large force to pursue a military campaign in Ireland.
- May 29 – Nine Years' War: Essex captures Cahir Castle in Munster.
- August 15 – Nine Years' War: Irish victory over the English at the Battle of Curlew Pass.
- September 8 – Essex in Ireland: Essex signs a truce with Hugh O'Neill, then leaves Ireland against the instructions of Queen Elizabeth.

== Births ==
- April 17 – Patrick Fleming, Franciscan ecclesiastical scholar (d. 1631)
- Probable date – John Lynch (Gratianus Lucius), Roman Catholic priest and historian (d. c.1677)
- Brian O'Rourke, son of Tadhg O'Rourke of West Breifne and Mary O'Donnell of Tyrconnell. Died in the Tower of London in 1641.

== Deaths ==
- January 19 – Richard Bingham, Marshal of Ireland, dies upon arrival in Dublin
- August 15 – Conyers Clifford, English commander, killed at Curlew Pass
- December 14 – Joan Boyle, first wife of Richard Boyle, 1st Earl of Cork, in childbirth (b. 1578)
- December 31 – John Houling, Jesuit, of plague in Lisbon, (b. c.1539)
