= 1607 in Ireland =

- Centuries: 15th; 16th; 17th; 18th; 19th
- Decades: 1580s; 1590s; 1600s; 1610s; 1620s
- See also: Other events of 1607; List of years in Ireland

Events from the year 1607 in Ireland.

== Incumbent ==
- Monarch: James I

== Events ==
- September 14 – Flight of the Earls: Hugh O'Neill, 2nd Earl of Tyrone and Rory O'Donnell, 1st Earl of Tyrconnell flee to Spain to avoid capture by the English crown.
- Plantation of Ulster, following the Flight of the Earls.
  - The Kingdom of East Breifne is disestablished and settled by English and Scottish colonists.
  - Sir Randall MacDonnell settles 300 Presbyterian Scots families on his land in Antrim.
  - Enniskillen Castle is taken by the English.
  - Lifford comes into the possession of Sir Richard Hansard.
- Construction of James's Fort, protecting Kinsale harbour, is completed to the design of Paul Ive.
- Construction of Prince Rupert's Tower, protecting Cork Harbour, is completed about this date.

== Births ==
- March 20 – Lady Alice Boyle, later Alice Barry, Countess of Barrymore (d. 1667)
- Geoffrey Baron, scholar, lawyer and rebel (d. 1651)
- Approximate date – Sir George Hamilton, 1st Baronet, of Donalong (d. 1679)

== Deaths ==
- Richard Netterville, lawyer and politician (b. c. 1540)
- Nicholas St Lawrence, 9th Baron Howth (b. c. 1550)
