= Geoffrey Barron =

Geoffrey Barron may refer to:

- Geoffrey Barron, fictional character, see Technocrat (character)
- Geoffrey Baron (rebel) (or Barron; 1607–1651), Irish rebel

== See also ==
- Geoffrey Baron (disambiguation)
