= 1600 in Ireland =

- Centuries: 14th; 15th; 16th; 17th; 18th
- Decades: 1580s; 1590s; 1600s; 1610s; 1620s
- See also: Other events of 1600; List of years in Ireland

Events from the year 1600 in Ireland.

== Incumbent ==
- Monarch: Elizabeth I

== Events ==
- January – Nine Years' War against England is renewed by Hugh O'Neill, 2nd Earl of Tyrone, with an invasion of Munster.
- 27 January – Colonel Richard Wingfield is made Marshal of Ireland by Queen Elizabeth.
- 18 February – Nine Years' War: Rebel cavalry in Munster led by Hugh Maguire (Lord of Fermanagh) are intercepted and their leaders killed.
- 15 May – Nine Years' War: Chief Niall Garbh Ó Domhnaill betrays the Irish alliance and allows Henry Docwra to land at Lough Foyle with an expeditionary force of 4,000 men. In a devastating blow to the rebels, Docwra sets up a series of fortifications along the River Foyle, cutting access between Tír Eoghain and Tyrconnell.
- 20 September – 9 October: the Battle of Moyry Pass is fought. Lord Mountjoy's English forces eventually break through Hugh O'Neill's defences in County Armagh and establish a short-lived garrison at Mountnorris but later retreat.

== Births ==
- Aedh O'Rourke, son of Tadhg O'Rourke of West Breifne and Mary O'Donnell of Tyrconnell.
- Heber MacMahon, Roman Catholic Bishop of Clogher (d. 1650)
- Terence Albert O'Brien, Roman Catholic Bishop of Emly, (d. 1651)
- John Temple, judge and politician (d. 1677)
- Approximate date
  - James Dillon, Confederate officer (d. after 1669)
  - Piaras Feiritéar, poet and harpist (d. 1653)
  - Rory O'Moore, landowner, noble and rebel leader (d. 1655)

== Deaths ==
- 18 February – Hugh Maguire, Lord of Fermanagh and prominent rebel leader, is killed in Munster.
- Baothghalach Mór Mac Aodhagáin, poet (b. 1550)

== Sources ==
- Murtagh, Harman (2004). "Dillon, Sir James". In Matthew, Colin; Harrison, Brian (eds.). Oxford Dictionary of National Biography. Vol. 16. New York: Oxford University Press. pp. 210–211. ISBN 0-19-861366-0.
