= 1624 in Ireland =

- Centuries: 15th; 16th; 17th; 18th; 19th
- Decades: 1600s; 1610s; 1620s; 1630s; 1640s
- See also: Other events of 1624; List of years in Ireland

Events from the year 1624 in Ireland.

== Incumbent ==
- Monarch: James I

== Events ==
- January 21 – proclamation ordering all Catholic Church ecclesiastics to leave Ireland within 40 days; suspended after a month.
- April 27 – the Norton Baronetcy, of Charlton in the County of Berkshire, is created in the Baronetage of Ireland in favour of English politician Gregory Norton.
- May 11 – the title of Baron Brereton, of Leighlin in the County of Carlow, is created in the Peerage of Ireland in favour of Sir William Brereton.
- September 24 – King James approves a revised programme of reform for the Plantation of County Londonderry.
- September 13 – the Style Baronetcy is created in the Baronetage of Ireland in favour of Humphry Style.
- December 31 – the title of Baron Herbert of Castle Island is created in the Peerage of Ireland in favour of Anglo-Welsh soldier, diplomat and poet Edward Herbert.

== Births ==
- William Caulfeild, 1st Viscount Charlemont (d. 1671)
- Caryll Molyneux, 3rd Viscount Molyneux (d. 1699)

== Deaths ==
- March 15 – Theobald Dillon, 1st Viscount Dillon, military commander and adventurer.
- David Kearney, Roman Catholic Archbishop of Cashel.
- Donogh O'Brien, 4th Earl of Thomond, military commander.

== Arts and literature ==
- Conclusion of the Contention of the bards.
