= 1619 in Ireland =

- Centuries: 15th; 16th; 17th; 18th; 19th
- Decades: 1590s; 1600s; 1610s; 1620s; 1630s
- See also: Other events of 1619; List of years in Ireland

Events from the year 1619 in Ireland.

== Incumbent ==
- Monarch: James I

== Events ==
- March – construction of the walls of Derry by The Honourable The Irish Society is completed, at a cost of £10,757.
- 28 March – Captain Nicholas Pynnar completes his Survey of the Escheated Counties of Ulster.
- 1 May – native Irish ordered to leave lands of the British Plantation of Ulster by this date or be fined.
- 3 October – Lancelot Bulkeley is consecrated Archbishop of Dublin (Church of Ireland), an office he will hold until 1650.
- Stewart Castle, Newtownstewart, County Tyrone, is built by Sir Robert Newcomen.
- Dermod O'Meara's text on genetic disorders, De Moribus: Pathologia Haereditaria Generalis is published in Dublin, the first work in Latin and the first medical text published in Ireland.

== Births ==
- Dudley Loftus, jurist and orientalist (d. 1695)

== Deaths ==
- 10 April – Thomas Jones, Protestant churchman (b. c.1550).
- Christopher St Lawrence, 10th Baron Howth, statesman (b. c.1568)
