= 1597 in Ireland =

- Centuries: 14th; 15th; 16th; 17th; 18th
- Decades: 1570s; 1580s; 1590s; 1600s; 1610s
- See also: Other events of 1597; List of years in Ireland

Events from the year 1597 in Ireland.

== Incumbent ==
- Monarch: Elizabeth I

== Events ==
- 11 March – Dublin Gunpowder Disaster: Huge explosion on the Dublin quays as barrels of gunpowder are unloaded; 126 killed, many more injured, and as many as forty houses demolished.
- November – Battle of Carrickfergus: The clan MacDonnell of Antrim led by Sorley Boy MacDonnell defeat the English.

== Deaths ==
- 29 July – Murrough O'Brien, 4th Baron Inchiquin, soldier (b. 1562)
- 3 August – Richard Meredith, Church of Ireland Bishop of Leighlin
- 14 October – Thomas Burgh, 3rd Baron Burgh, Lord Deputy of Ireland since 18 April (b. c.1558)
- Henry FitzGerald, 12th Earl of Kildare, soldier (b. 1562) (died of wounds)
- Fiach McHugh O'Byrne, clan chief (b. 1534)
