= 1626 in Ireland =

- Centuries: 15th; 16th; 17th; 18th; 19th
- Decades: 1600s; 1610s; 1620s; 1630s; 1640s
- See also: Other events of 1626; List of years in Ireland

Events from the year 1626 in Ireland.

== Incumbent ==
- Monarch: Charles I

== Events ==
- King Charles I of England, Scotland and Ireland institutes a plantation on the royal estate of Upper Ossory in County Laois.
- Charter of Waterford (revoked in 1618) is restored.

== Births ==
- Willam Dongan, 1st Earl of Limerick

== Deaths ==
- 22 September – Hugh MacCaghwell, Franciscan theologian and archbishop (born 1571)
- Date unknown – Niall Garve O'Donnell, last Prince of Tyrconnell (born 1569)
