= 1612 in Ireland =

- Centuries: 15th; 16th; 17th; 18th; 19th
- Decades: 1590s; 1600s; 1610s; 1620s; 1630s
- See also: Other events of 1612; List of years in Ireland

Events from the year 1612 in Ireland.

== Incumbent ==
- Monarch: James I

== Events ==
- 10 April – a royal charter of King James VI and I creates the City and County of Londonderry, and The Honourable The Irish Society to run the new plantation.
- The town of Roscommon is incorporated.

== Births ==
- 20 October – Richard Boyle, 1st Earl of Burlington, cavalier and Lord High Treasurer of Ireland (d. 1698)
- Edward King, poet (d. 1637)

== Deaths ==
- 1 February – Conor O'Devany, 8th Roman Catholic Bishop of Down and Connor, executed for high treason (b. c. 1532)
- 1 February – Patrick O'Loughran, Roman Catholic priest, executed for high treason.

== Publications ==
- John Davies – Discoverie of the True Causes why Ireland was never entirely subdued.[sic]
