= 1641 in Ireland =

- Centuries: 15th; 16th; 17th; 18th; 19th
- Decades: 1620s; 1630s; 1640s; 1650s; 1660s
- See also: Other events of 1641; List of years in Ireland

Events from the year 1641 in Ireland.

== Incumbent ==
- Monarch: Charles I

== Events ==
- The breakdown of English power prompts widespread attacks by the dispossessed Irish population on the English and Scottish settlers. Ardfert and Dromore Cathedrals are burned down, Castle Roche ruined and the model town around Dunluce Castle destroyed.
- October 23 – the Irish Rebellion of 1641 enjoys rapid success in Ulster, with Felim O'Neill of Kinard taking several forts, claiming to be acting in the King's name, but Hugh Og MacMahon and Connor Maguire, who were to seize Dublin Castle, are arrested due to an informer.
- October 24 – the Proclamation of Dungannon is issued, justifying the rebellion and proclaiming Catholic loyalty to Charles I.
- November 12 – the Parliament of England votes to send an army to Ireland to counter the rebellion.
- November 29 – Battle of Julianstown: Felim O’Neill routs a force of Government soldiers.
- December
  - Rebel forces under Felim O'Neill begin the siege of Drogheda.
  - William Bedell, Church of Ireland Bishop of Kilmore, with other refugees is imprisoned and tortured by rebels at Cloughoughter Castle.
  - Cootehall comes into the possession of the Englishman, Chidley Coote, nephew of the first Earl of Mountrath.

== Births ==
- Hildebrand Alington, 5th Baron Alington, peer
