= 1606 in Ireland =

- Centuries: 15th; 16th; 17th; 18th; 19th
- Decades: 1580s; 1590s; 1600s; 1610s; 1620s
- See also: Other events of 1606; List of years in Ireland

Events from the year 1606 in Ireland.

== Incumbent ==
- Monarch: James I

== Events ==
- Plantation of Ulster: substantial lowland Scots settlement on disinhibited land in north Down, led by Hugh Montgomery and James Hamilton.
- County Wicklow becomes the last of the traditional counties of Ireland to be shired, from land previously part of counties Dublin and Carlow.
- Donal of the Pipes, 13th Prince of Carbery, chooses to surrender and regrant his barony to the Crown of England.
- Anglican churchman William Bedell translates the Book of Common Prayer into Irish.

== Births ==
- June 16 – Arthur Chichester, 1st Earl of Donegall, soldier (d. 1675)
- October – Hugh O'Donnell, 2nd Earl of Tyrconnell, soldier (d. 1642)
- approximate date – Claud Hamilton, 2nd Baron Hamilton of Strabane, nobleman (d. 1638)

== Deaths ==
- February 21 – Richard Field, superior of the Irish Jesuit mission (b. c.1554)
- Sir Edmund Pelham, judge (b. c.1533)
