= 1595 in Ireland =

- Centuries: 14th; 15th; 16th; 17th; 18th
- Decades: 1570s; 1580s; 1590s; 1600s; 1610s
- See also: Other events of 1595; List of years in Ireland

Events from the year 1595 in Ireland.

== Incumbent ==
- Monarch: Elizabeth I

== Events ==
- Ongoing – Nine Years' War: Rebellion of Hugh O'Neill, 2nd Earl of Tyrone and Hugh Roe O'Donnell of Tyrconnell (lasts until 1603).
- 25–27 March – Battle of Clontibret in County Monaghan: Tyrone's forces achieve victory over English troops led by Sir Henry Bagenal in the first major action of the Nine Years' War.
- 4 September – Lieutenant Colonel Richard Wingfield is wounded in a clash with Tyrone's troops in Ulster. He is knighted by the Lord Deputy of Ireland, Sir William Russell, in Christ Church Cathedral, Dublin, on 9 November before returning to England.

== Births ==
- Daniel O'Daly, diplomat and historian (d. 1662)
- Approximate date – John Barnewall, Franciscan friar (d. c.1650)

== Deaths ==
- 2 March – John Garvey, Archbishop of Armagh (Church of Ireland) (b. 1527)
- Seamus Ó hÉilidhe, Archbishop of Tuam (Roman Catholic).
- Turlough Luineach O'Neill, clan leader (b. 1532)
