= 1602 in Ireland =

- Centuries: 15th; 16th; 17th; 18th; 19th
- Decades: 1580s; 1590s; 1600s; 1610s; 1620s
- See also: Other events of 1602; List of years in Ireland

Events from the year 1602 in Ireland.

== Incumbent ==
- Monarch: Elizabeth I

== Events ==
- 3 January – Nine Years' War: The English defeat Irish rebels and their Spanish allies at the siege of Kinsale. (The battle happens on this date according to the Gregorian calendar used by the Irish and Spanish but on Thursday, 24 December, 1601 according to the old Julian calendar used by the English.)
- 12 January – Juan del Águila surrenders the Spanish troops in Ireland.
- 5–18 June – Nine Years' War: The English defeat Irish rebels at the siege of Dunboy. The Jesuit chaplain Dominic Collins is arrested, tortured and hanged by the English at Youghal.
- June – Hugh O'Neill, Earl of Tyrone abandons and burns his capital Dungannon.

== Publications ==
- The first New Testament translation into Irish (Tiomna Nuadh), completed by William Daniel, Prebendary of St Patrick's Cathedral, Dublin, is published.

== Deaths ==
- 17 August? – Sir Christopher Nugent, nobleman (b. 1544)
- 10 September – Hugh Roe O'Donnell, Prince of Tyrconnell, leader in the Nine Years War (b. 1572)
- 31 October – Dominic Collins, Catholic martyr (b. 1566)
- 31 December – Maoilín Óg Mac Bruaideadha, poet.
- Sir Edmund Butler of Cloughgrenan, rebel (b. 1534)
- Edmund Butler, 2nd Viscount Mountgarret, nobleman (b. c.1562)
