= 1620 in Ireland =

- Centuries: 15th; 16th; 17th; 18th; 19th
- Decades: 1600s; 1610s; 1620s; 1630s; 1640s
- See also: Other events of 1620; List of years in Ireland

Events from the year 1620 in Ireland.

== Incumbent ==
- Monarch: James I

== Events ==
- County Longford is planted by English and Scottish landowners, with much of the O'Farrell lands being confiscated and granted to new owners.
- Bangor, County Down, is granted the status of a port by King James I of England.

== Honours ==
- 13 October – the Blundell Baronetcy is created in the Baronetage of Ireland in favour of Francis Blundell, Vice-Treasurer and Receiver-General of Ireland.
- 10 November – the Parsons Baronetcy, of Bellamont in the County of Dublin, is created in the Baronetage of Ireland in favour of William Parsons, Surveyor General of Ireland.
- 12 December – the title of Earl of Antrim is created in the Peerage of Ireland in favour of Randal MacDonnell, Viscount Dunluce.
- The titles of Earl of Cork and Viscount of Dungarvan are created in the Peerage of Ireland in favour of Richard Boyle, Lord Boyle.
- The title of Viscount Grandison is created in the Peerage of Ireland in favour of Oliver St John, Lord Deputy of Ireland.

== Births ==
- Peter Talbot, Archbishop of Dublin (Roman Catholic) (d. 1680)
- Approximate date – Redmond O'Hanlon, outlaw (d. 1681)

== Deaths ==
- February 15 – James Archer, Jesuit (b. 1550)
- July 10 – John Boyle, Bishop of Cork, Cloyne and Ross (b. 1563?)
