= 1618 in Ireland =

- Centuries: 15th; 16th; 17th; 18th; 19th
- Decades: 1590s; 1600s; 1610s; 1620s; 1630s
- See also: Other events of 1618; List of years in Ireland

Events from the year 1618 in Ireland.

== Incumbent ==
- Monarch: James I

== Events ==
- 23 January – Charter of Waterford revoked after election of recusants (restored 1626).
- 19 February – Richard Wingfield is created first Viscount Powerscourt.
- 1 October – native Irish ordered to leave lands of the British Plantation of Ulster by 1 May 1619 or be fined.
- 1 December – Captain Nicholas Pynnar begins his Survey of the Escheated Counties of Ulster.

== Publications ==
- Aodh Mac Cathmhaoil (Hugh MacCaghwell or Hugo Cavellus) publishes Scáthán Shacramuinte na hAthridhe (or Tractatus de poenitentia et indulgentiis) in Irish at Louvain.

== Births ==
- Thomas Blood, soldier who tries to steal the Crown Jewels of England from the Tower of London in 1671 (d. 1680)

== Deaths ==
- Richard Stanihurst, translator, poet and historian (b. 1547)
