= 1627 in Ireland =

- Centuries: 15th; 16th; 17th; 18th; 19th
- Decades: 1600s; 1610s; 1620s; 1630s; 1640s
- See also: Other events of 1627; List of years in Ireland

Events from the year 1627 in Ireland.

== Incumbent ==
- Monarch: Charles I

== Events ==
- 23 May – the office of Second Serjeant-at-law at the Irish Bar is created, the first holder being Nathaniel Catelyn.
- The title Earl of Meath is created in the Peerage of Ireland. Since its creation the title has remained in the Brabazon family.
- Muircheartach Óg Ó Cíonga is employed by William Bedell, Provost of Trinity College Dublin, to teach Irish to the Protestants studying there.

== Births ==
- 25 January – Robert Boyle, chemist and physicist (d. 1691)

== Deaths ==
- Cormac Mac Con Midhe, poet.
