= 1594 in Ireland =

- Centuries: 14th; 15th; 16th; 17th; 18th
- Decades: 1570s; 1580s; 1590s; 1600s; 1610s
- See also: Other events of 1594; List of years in Ireland

Events from the year 1594 in Ireland.

== Incumbent ==
- Monarch: Elizabeth I

== Events ==
- 18 August – the monks of the abbey on Innisfallen Island are dispossessed by the Crown.
- Enniskillen Castle is besieged and captured by the English under Captain John Dowdall. It is subsequently retaken by Rory Maguire and recaptured by William Russell (Lord Deputy of Ireland).

== Births ==
- 26 November – Sir James Ware, historian, politician and Auditor general for Ireland (died 1666)

== Deaths ==
- Sir William Weston, Chief Justice of the Irish Common Pleas (b. c.1546)
