= 1615 in Ireland =

- Centuries: 15th; 16th; 17th; 18th; 19th
- Decades: 1590s; 1600s; 1610s; 1620s; 1630s
- See also: Other events of 1615; List of years in Ireland

Events from 1615 in Ireland.

== Incumbent ==
- Monarch: James I

== Events ==
- 18 April – the "Native's Rebellion": Arthur Chichester, 1st Baron Chichester, Lord Deputy of Ireland, informs the Privy Council of England of a plot by Hugh McShane O'Neill, Brian Crossagh, Rory O'Cahan and Alexander McDonald to massacre Ulster planters and of the arrest of many conspirators.
- 25 April – convocation of the Church of Ireland ends, having adopted 104 Articles of Religion largely drafted by James Ussher.
- 31 July – Cú Chonnacht Ó Cianáin (having been racked) and five others are sentenced to hanging for their part in the insurrection.
- 24 October – James I's Parliament of Ireland is dissolved (its third session having been held 18 April–16 May).
- Act makes parishes responsible for road maintenance, labourers and cottiers to supply six days free labour annually.

== Births ==
- Thomas Dillon, 4th Viscount Dillon, politician (d. c.1672)
- Katherine Jones, Viscountess Ranelagh, intellectual (d. 1691)
- William Lamport, adventurer (d. 1659)
- Alexander MacDonnell, 3rd Earl of Antrim, military commander (d. 1699)

== Deaths ==
- c. August – Cú Chonnacht Ó Cianáin, rymer and insurrectionist (hanged)
