= 1614 in Ireland =

- Centuries: 15th; 16th; 17th; 18th; 19th
- Decades: 1590s; 1600s; 1610s; 1620s; 1630s
- See also: Other events of 1614; List of years in Ireland

Events from the year 1614 in Ireland.

== Incumbent ==
- Monarch: James I

== Events ==
- April 2 – James I rebukes a deputation from the Catholic opposition in the Parliament of Ireland.
- June 22 – the Synod of Kilkenny regulates discipline and practice in the Catholic Province of Dublin.
- The Irish Parliament passed the Highways Act which required local parishes to maintain roads within their boundaries serving market towns.

== Arts and literature ==
- Dermod O'Meara produces the first book of Latin verse published in Ireland, Ormonius.

== Births ==
- July 10 – Arthur Annesley, 1st Earl of Anglesey, royal statesman (d. 1686)

== Deaths ==
- June 17 – William Bathe, Jesuit priest and linguist (b. 1564)
- November 15 – Giolla Brighde Ó hEoghusa (Bonaventura Ó hEoghusa or O'Hussey), poet and priest.
- November 22 – Thomas Butler, 10th Earl of Ormonde, Lord Treasurer of Ireland (b. c. 1513)
