= 1628 in Ireland =

- Centuries: 15th; 16th; 17th; 18th; 19th
- Decades: 1600s; 1610s; 1620s; 1630s; 1640s
- See also: Other events of 1628; List of years in Ireland

Events from the year 1628 in Ireland.

== Incumbent ==
- Monarch: Charles I

== Events ==
- 1 January – the first seminarians enter into residence at the Irish College in Rome, established by Cardinal Ludovisi.
- Members of the Parliament of Ireland propose The Graces, in an attempt to reverse anti-Catholic legislation.

== Births ==
- 14 February – Valentine Greatrakes, faith healer (died 1682)

== Deaths ==
- 11 July – William Daniel, Church of Ireland Archbishop of Tuam.
