= 1613 in Ireland =

- Centuries: 15th; 16th; 17th; 18th; 19th
- Decades: 1590s; 1600s; 1610s; 1620s; 1630s
- See also: Other events of 1613; List of years in Ireland

Events from the year 1613 in Ireland.

== Incumbent ==
- Monarch: James I

== Events ==
- King James I commissions George Calvert, Sir Humphrey Wynch, Sir Charles Cornwallis and Sir Roger Wilbraham to investigate Catholic grievances in Ireland. They report that conformity should be enforced more strictly, Catholic schools be suppressed, and bad priests removed and punished.
- Plantation of Ulster: Derry reincorporated under that name by charter (29 March) and its reconstruction as a walled planned city, under the auspices of The Honourable The Irish Society, begins.
- Incorporation of the enlarged County Londonderry, incorporating County Coleraine.
- Incorporation of the town of Coleraine by charters (25 March and 28 June).
- Arthur Chichester, Lord Deputy of Ireland, is created 1st Baron Chichester of Belfast. Belfast is constituted a municipal corporation, comprising a Sovereign, twelve burgesses and a commonalty, with the privilege of sending two representatives to the Parliament of England. The first Sovereign appointed is Thomas Vesey, and the first representatives to parliament are Sir John Blennerhasset, Baron of the Exchequer of Ireland, and George Trevillian.

== Births ==
- Richard Bellings, lawyer and Confederate politician (d. 1677)

== Deaths ==
- 2 April – Henry Ussher, Church of Ireland Archbishop of Armagh (b. c.1550)
- 1 December – Theobald Butler, 1st Viscount Butler of Tulleophelim, peer.
