= 1631 in Ireland =

- Centuries: 15th; 16th; 17th; 18th; 19th
- Decades: 1610s; 1620s; 1630s; 1640s; 1650s
- See also: Other events of 1631; List of years in Ireland

Events from the year 1631 in Ireland.

== Incumbent ==
- Monarch: Charles I

== Events ==
- March 28 – the Morres Baronetcy, of Knockagh in the County of Tipperary, is created in the Baronetage of Ireland in favour of John Morres.
- June 20 – Sack of Baltimore: the town of Baltimore, County Cork, is sacked by Algerian pirates.
- December 22 – the titles of Viscount Clanmalier and Baron Phillipstown are created in the Peerage of Ireland in favour of Terence O'Dempsey.

== Births ==
- William Handcock, politician (d. 1707)

== Deaths ==
- April 18 – Henry Docwra, 1st Baron Docwra of Culmore, soldier, statesman and "the founder of Derry" (b. 1564)
- November 7 – Patrick Fleming, Franciscan scholar (b. 1599)
