= 1623 in Ireland =

- Centuries: 15th; 16th; 17th; 18th; 19th
- Decades: 1600s; 1610s; 1620s; 1630s; 1640s
- See also: Other events of 1623; List of years in Ireland

Events from the year 1623 in Ireland.

== Incumbent ==
- Monarch: James I

== Events ==
- January 21 – Viscount Falkland, England's Lord Deputy of Ireland, issues a proclamation ordering all Roman Catholic priests to leave Ireland.
- June 20 – order issued requiring civic officials to take the Oath of Supremacy and enforcing excommunication against those who have relapsed.
- June 29 – Malcolm Hamilton is consecrated Church of Ireland Archbishop of Cashel.

== Honours ==
- February 4 – the Talbot Baronetcy, of Carton in the County of Kildare, is created in the Baronetage of Ireland for the lawyer and politician William Talbot.
- February 21 – the Barnewall Baronetcy, of Crickstown Castle in the County of Meath, is created in the Baronetage of Ireland for Patrick Barnewall.
- May 2 – the Stewart Baronetcy, of Ramelton in the County of Donegal, is created in the Baronetage of Ireland for the soldier William Stewart.
- December 30 – the Newcomen Baronetcy, of Kenagh in the County of Longford, is created in the Baronetage of Ireland for Robert Newcomen.
- The Dungan Baronetcy, of Castletown in the County of Kildare, is created in the Baronetage of Ireland for Walter Dungan.
- The title of Viscount Magennis of Iveagh is created for the chief of the clan Magennis.

== Births ==
- Sir George Downing, 1st Baronet, soldier, statesman and diplomat (d. 1684)
- Approximate date
  - James Lynch (archbishop of Tuam) (d. 1713)
  - Hugh Montgomery, 1st Earl of Mount Alexander, soldier (d. 1663)

== Deaths ==
- Henry Piers, landowner and politician (b. 1568)
