= 1592 in Ireland =

- Centuries: 14th; 15th; 16th; 17th; 18th
- Decades: 1570s; 1580s; 1590s; 1600s; 1610s
- See also: Other events of 1592; List of years in Ireland

Events from the year 1592 in Ireland.

== Incumbent ==
- Monarch: Elizabeth I

== Events ==
- 6 January – Hugh Roe O'Donnell and the brothers Art and Henry O'Neill escape from Dublin Castle. With the assistance of Hugh O'Neill, 2nd Earl of Tyrone, O'Donnell reaches refuge in the stronghold of Fiach MacHugh O'Byrne at Glenmalure in the Wicklow Mountains, but loses both big toes to frostbite, while Art O'Neill dies of exposure (See: Art O'Neill Challenge). Hugh's father, Aodh mac Maghnusa Ó Domhnaill, abdicates as An Ó Domhnaill (The O'Donnell) and King of Tír Chonaill in his son's favour at the instance of his second wife (Hugh's mother) Iníon Dubh.
- 3 March – Trinity College Dublin, Ireland's oldest university, is founded by letters patent from Queen Elizabeth.
- 3 November – Sir John Perrot, former Lord Deputy of Ireland, dies in the Tower of London awaiting sentence for a conviction for high treason.
- December – Edmund MacGauran, Roman Catholic Archbishop of Armagh arrives at Drogheda from Bilbao (having escaped attack by pirates) with a promise from King Philip II of Spain to send troops to support a rebellion in Ireland next summer. At Christmas, he holds a conference of seven northern bishops in the Franciscan friary in Donegal which proposes formation of a Catholic confederacy or league among the nobility and clergy of Ulster and Connacht under the leadership of Tyrconnell.

== Births ==
- Nicholas Barnewall, 1st Viscount Barnewall, landowner (d. 1663)
- Bishop Robert Ussher, Provost of Trinity College, Dublin (d. 1642)

== Deaths ==
- Sir Lucas Dillon, lawyer (b. c.1530)
- Sir Nicholas White, lawyer (b. c.1532)
