= Mass for You at Home =

- Genre: Religious
- Country of origin: Australia
- Original language: English
- No. of seasons: 50

Production
- Producer: John Rowland (2007–2020)
- Running time: 30 minutes

Original release
- Network: Network 10
- Release: August 1971 – present

Mass for You at Home is a religious television program broadcast by Network 10. It is the longest-running Australian religious television program; it is also Australia's fourth-longest-running television program overall, and the longest-running show broadcast on Australian commercial television.

The program is intended to allow observant Catholics, particularly those with mobility problems, to participate in a mass from their homes. Mass for You at Home is broadcast on Network 10 on Sundays and Aurora Channel on Foxtel every day. The programme typically has thousands of viewers around Australia.

== Production ==
The program has been broadcast by Network 10 since August 1971. It was initially a joint venture between the Catholic Archdiocese of Melbourne and the network, which also offers airtime for the show.

Before 2021 the show was filmed entirely at 10's Como studios in Melbourne, with a year's worth of episodes typically filmed in January for broadcast throughout the year. In December 2020 it was announced that the show would undergo some production changes, including a "new look" and the filming of masses in churches. In 2021 the filming of the show moved to Wollongong, and is now produced by the Catholic Diocese of Wollongong in partnership with the Australian Catholic Bishops Conference.

Geoffrey Baron was a celebrant on this program for 30 years. In 2006 he received national attention as a result of an altercation with teenagers that was recorded and subsequently uploaded to YouTube.

Cardinal Pell frequently watched the program during his imprisonment in 2019-20 and expressed appreciation for its quality.

== See also ==
- List of longest-running Australian television series
