= 1601 in Ireland =

- Centuries: 15th; 16th; 17th; 18th; 19th
- Decades: 1580s; 1590s; 1600s; 1610s; 1620s
- See also: Other events of 1601; List of years in Ireland

Events from the year 1601 in Ireland.

== Incumbent ==
- Monarch: Elizabeth I

== Events ==
- January – Nine Years' War: John Óge Burke is captured, and later executed.
- September 19 – Fourth Spanish Armada makes landfall at Kinsale.
- October 2 – Siege of Kinsale by Spanish forces begins.
- November 30 – Prince Hugh Roe O'Donnell, on his way to the Battle of Kinsale, visits and venerates a relic of the True Cross (Holy rood) on the Feast of St. Andrew, at Holy Cross Abbey.
- December 6 – The Battle of Castlehaven is fought off the south coast of Ireland as six Spanish navy ships led by General Pedro de Zubiaur are intercepted by an English fleet of four warships led and commanded by Sir Richard Levenson. Two of the Spanish ships are sunk and the other four are run aground.
- Moyry Castle built.

== Deaths ==
- April – Emon O'Reilly, King of East Breifne
- June – John Óge Burke, rebel soldier.
- November – James FitzGerald, 1st Earl of Desmond, exiled noble (b. c.1570)
- Ulick Burke, 3rd Earl of Clanricarde, noble.
- John Chardon, Church of Ireland Bishop of Down and Connor.
