= 1634 in Ireland =

- Centuries: 15th; 16th; 17th; 18th; 19th
- Decades: 1610s; 1620s; 1630s; 1640s; 1650s
- See also: Other events of 1634; List of years in Ireland

Events from the year 1634 in Ireland.

== Incumbent ==
- Monarch: Charles I

== Events ==
- 11 November – the Irish House of Commons passes an Act for the Punishment of the Vice of Buggery.
- The Parliament of Ireland accepts the Thirty-Nine Articles under pressure from King Charles and Archbishop Laud.
- Foras Feasa ar Éirinn (literally "Foundation of Knowledge on Ireland", more usually translated "History of Ireland") is completed by Geoffrey Keating in Early Modern Irish. This history of Ireland from ancient times is circulated in manuscript as the English rulers of the country suppress the printing of Irish history.
- Landowner Sir Vincent Gookin publishes and circulates in Munster (under the form of a letter addressed to the Lord Deputy of Ireland, Thomas Wentworth) a bitter attack on everyone in Ireland and is forced to return in haste to England to escape prosecution.

== Births ==
- July – Thomas Butler, 6th Earl of Ossory, soldier and politician (d. 1680)
- Thomas Dongan, 2nd Earl of Limerick, member of Irish Parliament, Royalist military officer during the English Civil War and governor of the Province of New York (d. 1715)

== Deaths ==
- Walter Butler, 11th Earl of Ormonde (b. c. 1578)
