= 1639 in Ireland =

- Centuries: 15th; 16th; 17th; 18th; 19th
- Decades: 1610s; 1620s; 1630s; 1640s; 1650s
- See also: Other events of 1639; List of years in Ireland

Events from the year 1639 in Ireland.

== Incumbent ==
- Monarch: Charles I

== Events ==
- Richard Nugent, 1st Earl of Westmeath, builds Clonyn Castle overlooking Delvin, County Westmeath.
- Theobald Stapleton publishes (in Brussels) a catechism in the Early Modern Irish language, Catechismus seu doctrina christiana latino-hibernica or, in Irish, Cathcismus sen Adhon, an Teagasc Críostaí iar na foilsiú a Laidin & a Ngaoilaig. It is the first Roman Catholic book in which the Irish language is printed in the antiqua typeface and the first notable attempt to simplify Irish orthography.

== Arts and literature ==
- Autumn – James Shirley's play Saint Patrick for Ireland opens at the Werburgh Street Theatre in Dublin.

== Deaths ==
- March 8 – Edward King, Church of Ireland Bishop of Elphin
- July 26 – Henry O'Brien, 5th Earl of Thomond, peer (b. 1588)
- Approximate date – Muircheartach Óg Ó Cíonga, writer and priest (b. c.1562)
