= 1622 in Ireland =

- Centuries: 15th; 16th; 17th; 18th; 19th
- Decades: 1600s; 1610s; 1620s; 1630s; 1640s
- See also: Other events of 1622; List of years in Ireland

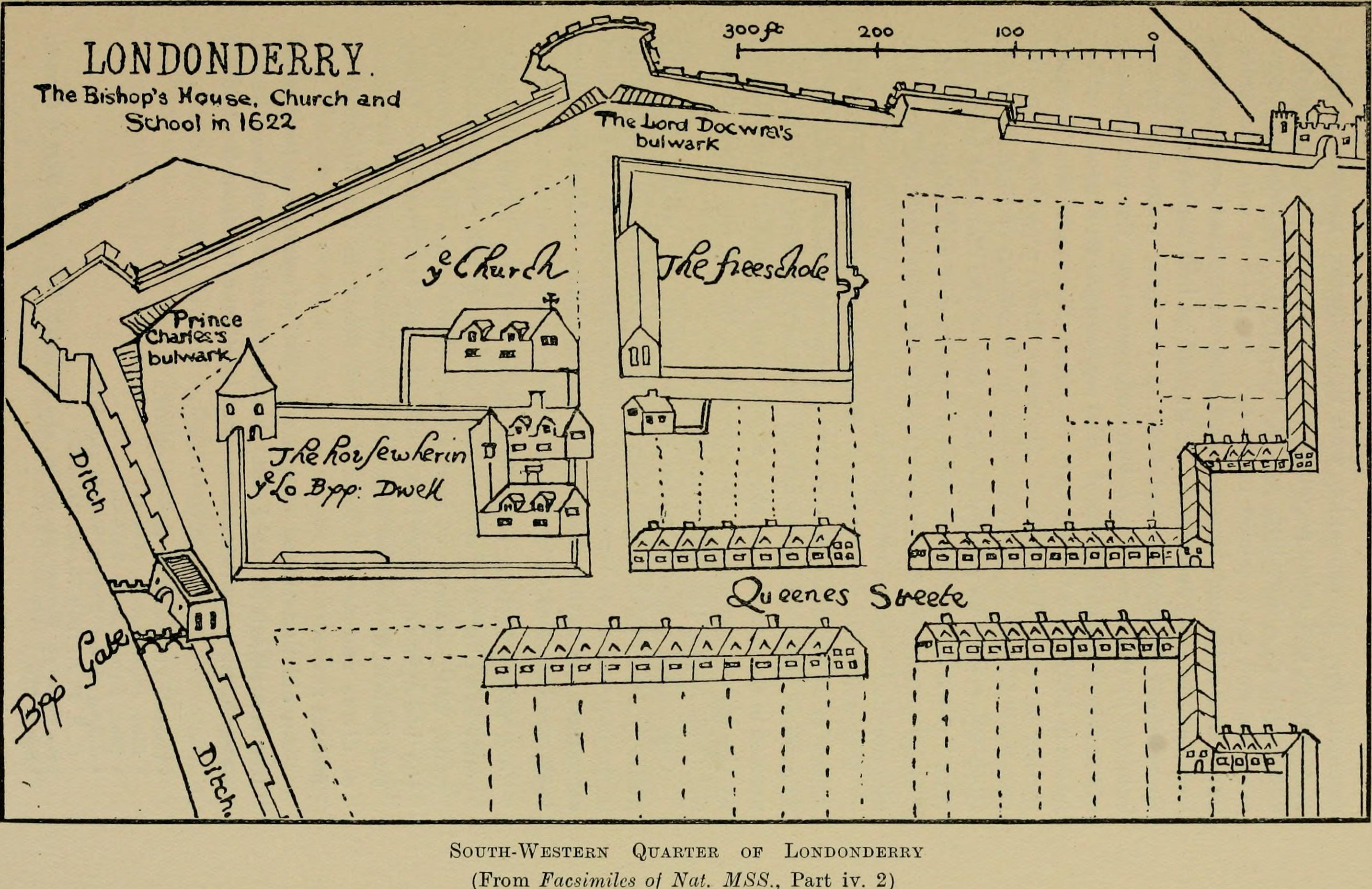
Map of Derry, 1622.

Events from the year 1622 in Ireland.

== Incumbent ==
- Monarch: James I

== Events ==
- A royal commission of inquiry into the Dublin Castle administration is sent from England, headed by Dudley Digges and including James Perrot.
- 18 April – Oliver St John surrenders the office of Lord Deputy of Ireland. He had served since 1616.
- 18 September – Henry Cary, 1st Viscount Falkland, is sworn in as Lord Deputy of Ireland.
- Thomas Dease is consecrated Roman Catholic Bishop of Meath, returning to Ireland from Paris.
- Frederick Hamilton is given lands in Leitrim.

== Honours ==
- January – The Courtenay Baronetcy of Newcastle, County Limerick, is created for George Courtenay.
- 3 May – The Montgomery Viscountcy of the Great Ards in the Peerage of Ireland is created for Hugh Montgomery.
- 5 August – The Earldom of Roscommon is created for James Dillon.

== Deaths ==
- 16 January – Patrick Barnewall, who objected to recusancy fees.
- 10 November – Henry Folliott, 1st Baron Folliott, who settled in Ballyshannon and developed the area around it (b. c.1568).
- 14 November – Miler Magrath, who was Catholic Bishop of Down and Connor 1565–1580 but converted and became Church of Ireland Archbishop of Cashel since 1571 (b. c.1523)
- Henry MacShane O'Neill, who was an Irish flaith and son of Shane O'Neill.
