= 1633 in Ireland =

- Centuries: 15th; 16th; 17th; 18th; 19th
- Decades: 1610s; 1620s; 1630s; 1640s; 1650s
- See also: Other events of 1633; List of years in Ireland

Events from the year 1633 in Ireland.

== Incumbent ==
- Monarch: Charles I

== Events ==
- St Columb's Cathedral, Derry is completed; the first post-Reformation Anglican cathedral built in the British Isles and the first Protestant cathedral built in Europe.

== Births ==
- William FitzMaurice, 20th Baron Kerry
- James Hamilton, 3rd Baron Hamilton of Strabane, peer (d. 1655)
