= 1609 in Ireland =

- Centuries: 15th; 16th; 17th; 18th; 19th
- Decades: 1580s; 1590s; 1600s; 1610s; 1620s
- See also: Other events of 1609; List of years in Ireland

Events from the year 1609 in Ireland.

== Incumbent ==
- Monarch: James I

== Events ==
- Plantation of Ulster
  - Protestant English and Presbyterian Scots settlers are imported directly by undertakers with the sanction of King James VI and I taking over forfeited estates of rebel leaders.
  - (July) The King submits Motives and Reasons to induce the City of London to undertake the Plantation in the North of Ireland to the City of London.
- John Taylor is granted 1,500 acres (6 km^{2}) of arable land in Ballyhaise, County Cavan.
- June 29 – Richard Wingfield is granted the Powerscourt Estate in County Wicklow for his part in suppressing Cahir O'Doherty's rebellion (1608).
- Arthur Chichester, Lord Deputy of Ireland, has 1,300 former Gaelic soldiers deported from Ulster to serve in the Swedish Army.
- Kilkenny is granted a royal charter by James I.
- James I issues letters patent granting the Church of St. Colman in Dromore the title and status of The Cathedral Church of Christ the Redeemer.

== Births ==
- Randal MacDonnell, 1st Marquess of Antrim, Roman Catholic landowner in Ireland and Scotland and political intriguer (d. 1683)
- Possible date – William Tirry, priest and Catholic martyr (d. 1654)
