= 1629 in Ireland =

- Centuries: 15th; 16th; 17th; 18th; 19th
- Decades: 1600s; 1610s; 1620s; 1630s; 1640s
- See also: Other events of 1629; List of years in Ireland

The following is a list of events from the year 1629 in Ireland.

== Incumbent ==
- Monarch: Charles I

== Events ==
- 15 October – the Osborne Baronetcy, of Ballentaylor in the County of Tipperary, and Ballylemon in the county of Wexford, is created in the Baronetage of Ireland in favour of Richard Osborne.
- 26 December – the Archbishop of Dublin, Lancelot Bulkeley, the Mayor and a body of musketeers invade and suppress a clandestine friary in Cook Street, Dublin, during Solemn Mass.
- A community of Colettine Poor Clares moves to Dublin.

== Births ==
- 1 November – Oliver Plunkett, Roman Catholic Archbishop of Armagh and Primate of All Ireland, last Catholic martyr to die in England, canonised (executed 1681)
- Ruaidhrí Ó Flaithbheartaigh, historian (d. 1716 or 1718)
- Sir Henry Piers, baronet, soldier and antiquarian (d. 1691)

== Deaths ==
- 4 March (bur) – Ambrose Ussher, Protestant scholar (b. c.1582)
- 18 June – Tiobóid na Long Bourke, 1st Viscount Mayo, clan chief (b. 1567)
- 18 November – Fláithrí Ó Maol Chonaire, Franciscan theologian (b. 1560)
- Sir Paul Gore, 1st Baronet, politician (b. 1567)
