= 1637 in Ireland =

- Centuries: 15th; 16th; 17th; 18th; 19th
- Decades: 1610s; 1620s; 1630s; 1640s; 1650s
- See also: Other events of 1637; List of years in Ireland

Events from the year 1637 in Ireland.

== Incumbent ==
- Monarch: Charles I

== Events ==
- February – Mícheál Ó Cléirigh seeks approbation for the text of the Annals of the Four Masters from Thomas Fleming, Archbishop of Dublin (Roman Catholic), before carrying the manuscript to Leuven.
- May 25 – letters patent authorise 'Laudian statutes' for Trinity College Dublin.
- July 25 – Christopher Wandesford acquires an estate at Castlecomer, County Kilkenny.
- August 10 – Edward King is drowned in the Irish Sea en route to visiting his family in Ireland, an event which inspires fellow poet Milton's elegy Lycidas.
- December 22 – a charter incorporates the guild of goldsmiths in Dublin and the Dublin Assay Office is established.

== Births ==
- Sir Stephen Rice, lawyer (d. 1715)
- Approximate date – Richard Head, writer and bookseller (d. c.1686)

== Deaths ==
- August 10 – Edward King, poet (b. 1612)
- Sir Nathaniel Catelyn, lawyer and politician (b. c.1580)
