= 1604 in Ireland =

- Centuries: 15th; 16th; 17th; 18th; 19th
- Decades: 1580s; 1590s; 1600s; 1610s; 1620s
- See also: Other events of 1604; List of years in Ireland

Events from the year 1604 in Ireland.

== Incumbent ==
- Monarch: James I

== Events ==
- July 11 – Derry chartered as a city.

== Births ==
- March 10 (claimed) – David Barry, 1st Earl of Barrymore (d. 1642)
- Ulick Burke, 1st Marquess of Clanricarde, nobleman and figure in English Civil War (d. 1657)
- Nicholas French, Bishop of Ferns, political activist and pamphleteer (d. 1678)

== Deaths ==
- January 28 – Brian Oge O'Rourke, King of West Breifne.
- Katherine FitzGerald, Countess of Desmond (b. c.1464)
