= 1625 in Ireland =

- Centuries: 15th; 16th; 17th; 18th; 19th
- Decades: 1600s; 1610s; 1620s; 1630s; 1640s
- See also: Other events of 1625; List of years in Ireland

Events from the year 1625 in Ireland.

== Incumbent ==
- Monarch: James I (until 27 March), then Charles I

== Events ==
- March 21 – James Ussher is appointed Archbishop of Armagh (Church of Ireland) and Primate of All Ireland.
- March 27 – Charles I becomes King of England, Scotland and Ireland upon the death of his father James I.
- Castle at Ballycastle, County Antrim, rebuilt by Randal MacDonnell, 1st Earl of Antrim.

== Births ==
- November 8 – Mary Rich, Countess of Warwick, née Boyle, courtier and diarist (d. 1678 in England)
- Dáibhí Ó Bruadair, poet (d. 1698)
- approximate date – Sir George Bingham, 2nd Baronet, politician (d. 1682)

== Deaths ==
- February 19 – Arthur Chichester, 1st Baron Chichester, English administrator and soldier, Lord Deputy of Ireland (b. 1563)
- March 10 – Francis Edgeworth, Clerk of the Crown and Hanaper in Ireland under James I
- December 25 – Connor Roe Maguire (Conchubhar Rua Mag Uidhir) was an Irish Gaelic chief from Magherastephana, County Fermanagh, nicknamed the Queen's Maguire for supporting Elizabeth I's campaign in the Nine Years' War.
