= 1608 in Ireland =

- Centuries: 15th; 16th; 17th; 18th; 19th
- Decades: 1580s; 1590s; 1600s; 1610s; 1620s
- See also: Other events of 1608; List of years in Ireland

Events from the year 1608 in Ireland.

== Incumbent ==
- Monarch: James I

== Events ==
- April – launch of O'Doherty's Rebellion. Following the Flight of the Earls and angered by land confiscations for the plantation of Ulster, Sir Cahir O'Doherty, Lord of Inishowen, sacks and burns Derry and Cahir's foster-father Felim Riabhach McDavitt kills the Governor, Sir George Paulet.
- April 20 – Old Bushmills Distillery is first licensed to distil whiskey at Bushmills, County Antrim, by King James I.
- July 5 – Cahir O'Doherty is shot dead at the Battle of Kilmacrennan, a skirmish with an English force under Sir Richard Wingfield. His severed head is displayed in Dublin for some time afterwards. The surviving rebels retreat to be besieged on Tory Island
- County Longford is transferred from Connacht to Leinster, has its boundaries defined and is divided into six baronies.
- Five royal schools in Ulster are given Royal Charter, by King James I.
- Approximate date – Randal MacDonnell establishes a model town around Dunluce Castle.

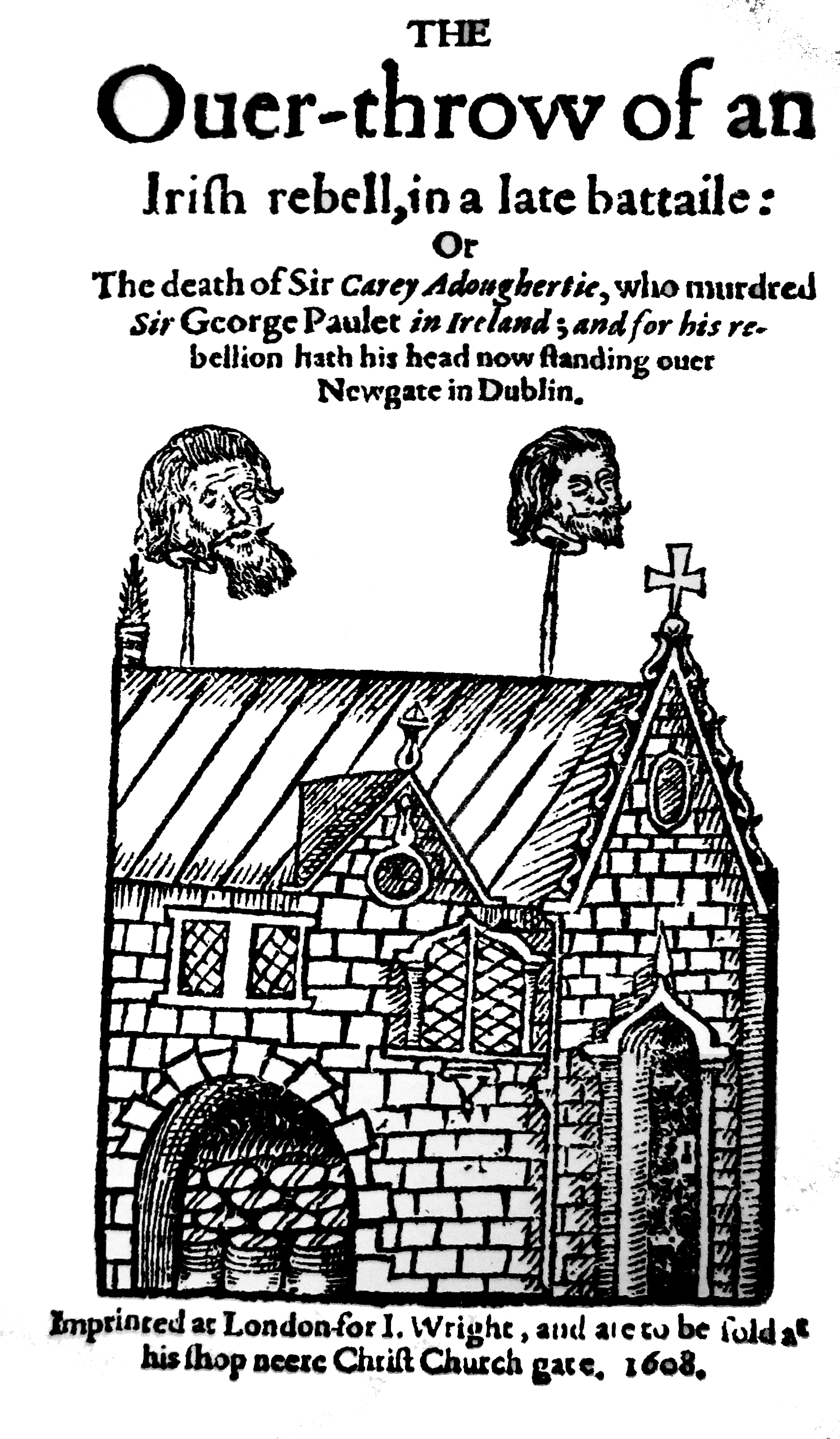
Dublin Gate 1608 displaying the heads of Irish rebels Cahir O'Doherty and Felim Riabhach McDavitt

== Births ==
- Probable date – William Tirry, priest (d. 1654)

== Deaths ==
- April 19 – Sir George Paulet, English soldier and Governor of Derry (b. 1553)
- April 23 – Edmund FitzGibbon, The White Knight (b. 1552?)
- July 5 – Sir Cahir O'Doherty, last Gaelic Lord of Inishowen and rebel leader (b. 1587)
