= 1638 in Ireland =

- Centuries: 15th; 16th; 17th; 18th; 19th
- Decades: 1610s; 1620s; 1630s; 1640s; 1650s
- See also: Other events of 1638; List of years in Ireland

Events from the year 1638 in Ireland.

== Incumbent ==
- Monarch: Charles I

== Events ==
- 13 January – proclamation enforcing the monopoly on tobacco held by the Lord Deputy of Ireland, Sir Thomas Wentworth.

== Arts and literature ==
- 1 January – James Shirley's comedy The Royal Master is premiered at the Werburgh Street Theatre, Dublin.

== Births ==
- Valentine Browne, 1st Viscount Kenmare, peer (d. 1694)

== Deaths ==
- 14 June – Claud Hamilton, 2nd Baron Hamilton of Strabane (b. c.1606)
