= 1621 in Ireland =

- Centuries: 15th; 16th; 17th; 18th; 19th
- Decades: 1600s; 1610s; 1620s; 1630s; 1640s
- See also: Other events of 1621; List of years in Ireland

Events from the year 1621 in Ireland.

== Incumbent ==
- Monarch: James I

== Events ==
- King James I of England claims royal inheritance of the whole of Upper Ossory in County Laois including the manor of Offerlane from the de Clare family at an inquisition held at Portlaoise. The king institutes a plantation of the area in 1626.
- 12 October: battle of starlings: two flocks of the birds gathered over the city of Cork and prepared for war like two trained armies before violently clashing. The attacks continued all day before a two-day recess until the fighting resumed. The fierce battle left the city deluged by broken wings and dead birds.

== Births ==
- Charles O'Kelly—Soldier and writer who fought in the Williamite War in Ireland and wrote the only account of the battle of Aughrim by an area native.
