= 1596 in Ireland =

- Centuries: 14th; 15th; 16th; 17th; 18th
- Decades: 1570s; 1580s; 1590s; 1600s; 1610s
- See also: Other events of 1596; List of years in Ireland

Events from the year 1596 in Ireland.

== Incumbent ==
- Monarch: Elizabeth I

== Events ==
- June – Sir John Norreys and Sir Geoffrey Fenton travel from England to Connacht to parley with the local lords.
- An envoy of King Philip II of Spain arrives to make inquiries of survivors of the Spanish Armada in Ireland but is successful in only eight cases.

== Deaths ==
- Donald McCarthy, Earl of Clancare, noble.
