= Máel Ísa Ó Raghallaigh =

Irish harper (born c. 1636)

Máel Ísa Ó Raghallaigh, also known as Myles O'Reilly (born c. 1636), was an Irish harper.

Ó Raghallaigh was a native of Killincarra, County Cavan, previously part of the Kingdom of Breifne, which his ancestors had ruled (see East Breifne).

He was the composer of the air known as "Lochaber", first printed by Thomas Duffet in 1676.
