= Thomas Arthur (physician) =

Irish physician (c. 1593–1666)

Thomas Arthur, M.D. (1593–1666?), was an Irish Roman Catholic physician.

Arthur was born to a family in Limerick, many members of which had filled municipal offices in that city in early times. His father's name being William, he often styled himself Thomas Arthur Fitz-William. He was educated at Bordeaux, and afterwards studied medicine in Paris. In May 1619, having returned to his native country, he began a successful practice in Limerick, and soon gained the reputation of a skilful physician.

In April 1624, he opened a practice in Dublin, where he spent the greater part of his time, but still attended patients in Limerick during occasional visits. In 1630, however, he moved his household to the capital. His manuscript entry-book contains a complete list of his patients and fees from 1619 to 1666, the last date being probably the year of his death. Among the various cases which he treated the most important one, or at least the one in which he took most pride, was that of Archbishop Usher, ‘pseudo-primas Ardmachanus,’ whose complaint had baffled the English physicians. Arthur effected a cure in 1626, and received a fee of 51l.

His success brought him the patronage of the lord deputy, Henry Cary, 1st Viscount Falkland. His entry-book also contains an exact record of his gradual accumulation of landed property, and also a few pieces in ponderous Latin verse. Among the latter is an ‘Anagramma physiognomicum in nomen Thomæ Wentworth, Proregis Hiberniæ, truculenti et nefarii hominis.’ But his greatest literary effort is a genealogical account, ‘Edylium genealogicum,’ of the family of Arthur, in Latin elegiacs, in which, besides the glory of his ancestors, he gives some particulars of his own life.
