= Irish independence =

Irish independence may refer to:

== Goal, variously envisaged, of political movements ==
- Irish nationalism
- Irish Patriot Party, 18th century
- Repeal of the Union, early 19th century
- Irish Home Rule movement, 1860s–1921
- Irish republicanism, since the 1790s
- United Ireland, since 1921

== Historical events ==
- Constitution of 1782, synonym: "legislative independence"
- Proclamation of the Irish Republic (Easter Monday 1916)
- Irish Declaration of Independence (21 January 1919) presented as a ratification of the 1916 Proclamation
- Irish War of Independence (1919–1921) first action coincided with the Declaration of Independence
- Anglo-Irish Treaty (6 December 1921) followed the truce ending the War of Independence
- Constitution of the Irish Free State (6 December 1922) implementing the 1921 Treaty
- Adoption of the Constitution of Ireland (29 December 1937)
- Republic of Ireland Act 1948 (Easter Monday 1949)

== See also ==
- Independent Ireland, a political party
- Irish Independent, a newspaper
