= 1603 in Ireland =

- Centuries: 15th; 16th; 17th; 18th; 19th
- Decades: 1580s; 1590s; 1600s; 1610s; 1620s
- See also: Other events of 1603; List of years in Ireland

Events from the year 1603 in Ireland.

== Incumbent ==
- Monarch: Elizabeth I (until 24 March), then James I.

== Events ==
- March 24 – James VI of Scotland becomes King James I of England and Ireland upon the death of Elizabeth I in England (but the news is withheld from the Irish leaders in treaty negotiations).
- March 31 – the Nine Years War (1595–1603) is ended by the submission of Hugh O'Neill, Earl of Tyrone, to the English Crown and the signing of the Treaty of Mellifont.
- November – Geoffrey Keating is one of forty students who sail for Bordeaux under the charge of the Rev. Diarmaid MacCarthy to begin their studies at the Irish College which has just been founded in that city by Cardinal François de Sourdis, Archbishop of Bordeaux.
- Ballintubber Abbey is suppressed.
- Sir Edmund Pelham, Chief Baron of the Irish Exchequer since 1602, holds the first assizes in Ulster, at Donegal.
- Brian Óg na Samhthach Ó Ruairc, King of West Breifne is overthrown.

== Births ==
- Approximate date – Audley Mervyn, lawyer, politician and soldier (d. 1675)

== Deaths ==
- March 24 – Queen Elizabeth I of England and Ireland (b. 1533)
- William Piers, Governor of Carrickfergus
