= 1605 in Ireland =

- Centuries: 15th; 16th; 17th; 18th; 19th
- Decades: 1580s; 1590s; 1600s; 1610s; 1620s
- See also: Other events of 1605; List of years in Ireland

Events from the year 1605 in Ireland.

== Incumbent ==
- Monarch: James I

== Events ==
- 3 February – Sir Arthur Chichester is appointed Lord Deputy of Ireland, an office he will hold for a decade.
- 11 March – a proclamation declares all people of Ireland to be the direct subjects of the British Crown and not of any local lord or chief.
- 4 July – a proclamation commands all Roman Catholic seminary priests and Jesuits to leave the country by 10 December and directs the laity to attend Church of Ireland services.
- 14 October – Thomas Jones is appointed to succeed Adam Loftus as Lord Chancellor of Ireland.
- 8 November – Thomas Jones is appointed to succeed Adam Loftus as Archbishop of Dublin (Church of Ireland).
- November – Scottish adventurer James Hamilton is granted the lordship of Upper (South) Clandeboye and the Great Ardes in the north of County Down by King James VI and I.
- The Irish College in Paris is co-founded by John Lee, an Irish priest, and John de l'Escalopier, President of the Parlement.
- Refugee French Huguenot merchants begin to settle in Dublin and Waterford.

== Births ==
- Raymond Caron, Franciscan friar and author (d. 1666)
- Lady Hester Pulter, born Hester Ley, poet (d. 1678 in England)
- Approximate date – James Dillon, 3rd Earl of Roscommon (d. 1649)

== Deaths ==
- 5 April – Adam Loftus, Archbishop of Dublin (Church of Ireland) and Lord Chancellor of Ireland (b. c.1533)
- 24 September – Sir George Bourchier, soldier and politician (b. 1535)
- Tadhg O'Rourke, King of West Breifne
