= Geoffrey Baron (priest) =

Australian priest

Monsignor Geoffrey (Geoff) Baron was the Dean of St Patrick's Cathedral in Melbourne, Victoria, Australia. He served in a number of Melbourne parishes and was a celebrant on Mass For You At Home for 30 years.

In 2006, he was captured on video dealing with a group of trespassers, after he told them to get off the church property and they refused to leave. Footage of the incident was posted on YouTube, but did not receive widespread attention until July 2007 when Australian media noticed it. The video indicates that he subjected a group of trespassing skateboarders to both verbal insult and physical force in an attempt to remove them from the property.

The Catholic Church apologised for Fr Baron's actions and he was granted leave from his duties at the cathedral while the situation was considered. A children's rights spokesperson said Baron's comments were disturbing, and recommended he enrol in an anger management course. Fr Baron also publicly apologised on local radio and has been condemned almost universally both from within and outside the Church. No charges were brought, however, as he acted in self-defence and was legally justified.

Further videos have since come to light also showing Fr Baron swearing and physically intimidating skateboarders around St Patrick's Cathedral.

On Tuesday, 21 August 2007, it was announced that Monsignor Baron "freely and spontaneously resigned".
