= 1598 in Ireland =

- Centuries: 14th; 15th; 16th; 17th; 18th
- Decades: 1570s; 1580s; 1590s; 1600s; 1610s
- See also: Other events of 1598; List of years in Ireland

Events from the year 1598 in Ireland.

== Incumbent ==
- Monarch: Elizabeth I

== Events ==
- early June – Nine Years' War: Lord Treasurer Thomas Butler backs the claim of the exiled Tadhg O'Rourke for the kingship of West Breifne, causing King Brian Óg O'Rourke to defect back to the rebels.
- 7 June – Nine Years' War: The temporary ceasefire agreed between the Irish rebel lordships and the English in October 1597 expires.
- 14 August – Nine Years' War: Hugh O'Neill, Earl of Tyrone's victory over an English expeditionary force under Henry Bagenal, at the Battle of the Yellow Ford.
- October – Nine Years' War: Edmund Spenser's castle at Kilcolman, near Doneraile in North Cork, is burned down by O'Neill's native Irish forces. Spenser leaves for London shortly afterwards.

== Births ==
- Patrick D'Arcy, nationalist who wrote the constitution of Confederate Ireland (d. 1668).

== Deaths ==
- 14 August – Henry Bagenal, Marshal of Ireland, is killed at Yellow Ford.
- 14 August – Maelmora O'Reilly, pretender to the kingship of East Breifne, is killed at Yellow Ford.
