= William Butler (alchemist) =

William Butler, Irish alchemist (c. 1534 – 29 January 1617), was, according to the Compendium of Irish Biography, "a well-known alchemist, one of the discoverers of the philosopher's stone, and of a powder for bringing the dead to life, was born in Clare about 1534. He died at sea, on his passage to Spain, 29 January 1617.

The sources cited for his life by the Compendium were the Nouvelle Biographie Générale (46 volumes, Paris, 1855-1866), of which it stated "An interleaved copy, copiously noted by the late Dr. Thomas Fisher, Assistant Librarian of Trinity College, Dublin."

== See also ==
- Edward Kelley
