= Émonn Ó Braonain =

Subject of an Irish poem (died 1632)

Émonn Ó Braonain (d.30 November 1632) was the subject of an Irish poem.

== Biography ==
A resident of Baile Adhaimh (now Adamstown), County Westmeath, his father's name was Tomás. He was succeeded by his son, Oliver, who was dispossessed in the 1650s. His family were of the Cenél nEnnae of the Southern Uí Néill. According to Paul Walsh (priest), "The name of O Braonáin is still common in the parish of Castletown, which lies a few miles to the south of the hill of Uisneach, Baile Ui Bhraonáin, now Brennanstown, in the same parish."

== Caoineadh Émonn Ó Braonain ==
Ó Braonain was the subject of a 36 verse lament, Caoineadh Émonn Ó Braonain, written sometime after his death. Paul Walsh had the following to say of the poem:

"The poem is anonymous in the manuscript. It was evidently written by one who had a training in the schools, possibly by an Cobhthaigh. That family gave many poets to Ireland, and the name was well represented in the neighbourhood of Adamstown in the seventeenth century."

Verse 11 describes the subject as "graceful hand/a loss to the poets/a friend to the churches/to his family his death is an evil/ and to the plain of white Meath a sorrow."

== The poem ==
The first three verses of the poem are given:

Coitchenn cumha chloinne Néill
do throim-loit orchra íad-séin,
cáoimh-chletha do clódh ré tan,
dáoir-chetha on mbrón dá mbáthadh.
Monúar atáid go tríamhuin
sliocht tuirseach Néill Náoighíalluigh,
an ceólchuire fár ghin goimh
nimh eólchuire dhá n-argoin.
Táinicc an chumhaidh c[h]oitchenn
go tteidhm bfíochdha bfornoicht-tenn
fán rígh-ealbha ó Bhóinn na mbenn,
mí-mheanma dhóibh an dílghenn.

Translation:

Universal is the grief of Niall's progeny, death
hath sorely pained them: fair warriors are
overpowered for a time, while showers of
sorrow flood upon them.
Alas, Niall Naoighiallach*s race is lamenting
in sorrow — grief has taken the place of merry
making — the sting of regret is overpowering them.
This universal grief has come together with a
raging destructive pestilence upon the royal
houses of Boyne of the peaks, the death is
a loss of courage to them.
