= John Houling =

Irish Jesuit (1539?–1599)

John Houling (1539?-1599), was an Irish Jesuit.

Houling was born in Wexford about 1539, and entered the Society of Jesus in 1571, being professed of the four vows. He seems to have been at Alcalá de Henares in 1578, at Rome in 1580, and at Lisbon in 1583. At Lisbon he laboured successfully for many years in the conversion and edification of such of his countrymen as either commerce or persecution brought to that port. In 1593, with the aid of Father Peter Fonseca, he established in that city a college dedicated to St. Patrick and the education of young Irish Roman Catholics. In 1599 Lisbon was visited by the plague, and, while administering to the physical and spiritual wants of its inhabitants, he fell a victim to its ravages, and died on 31 December 1599. He was highly esteemed by Fitzsimon and Coppinger.

Houling wrote Perbreve compendiium in quocontinentur nonnulli eorum qui Hybernia regnante impia Regina Elizabeth, vincula, exilium et martyrium perp?essi sunt, printed from a manuscript at Salamanca by Cardinal Moran in 'Spicilegium Ossoriense,' i. 82–109. The work is valuable, from the personal acquaintance of the writer with many of those whose lives he records.
