= Charles Molloy (lawyer) =

Irish lawyer

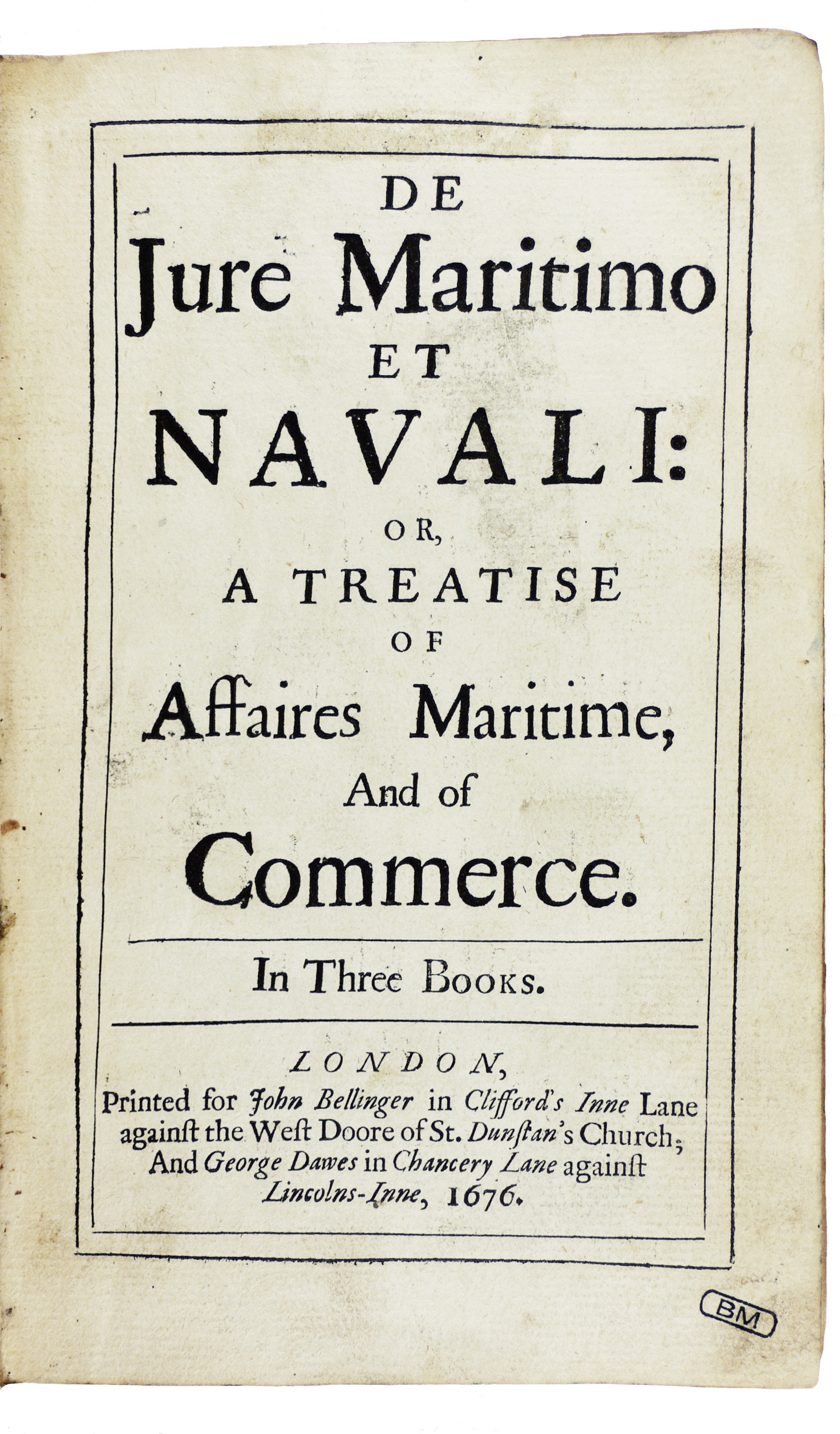
De jure maritimo et nauali, 1676.

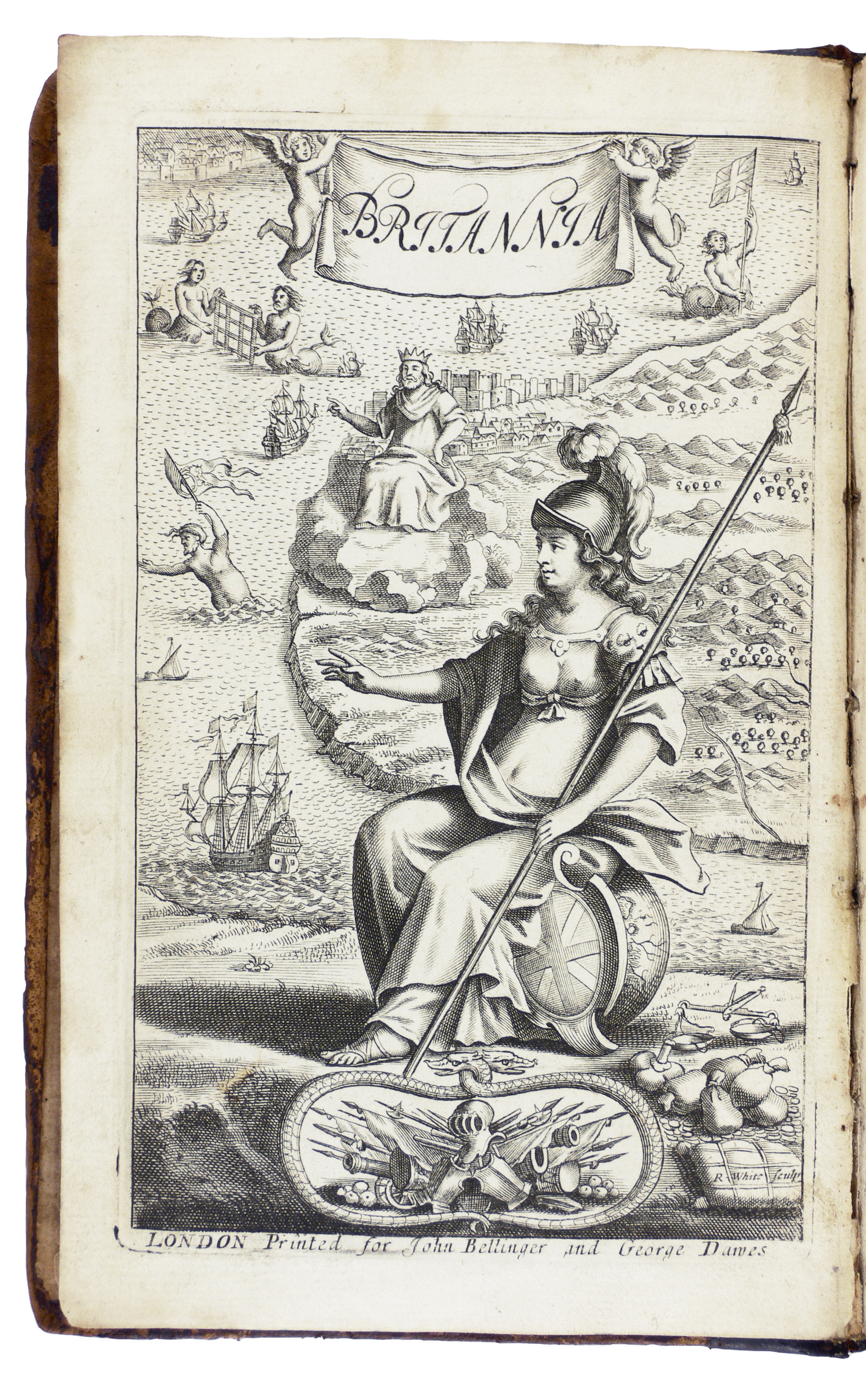
De jure maritimo et nauali, 1676.

Charles Molloy (1640–1690) was an Irish lawyer known as a writer on maritime law.

== Life ==
He was born in King's County, Ireland, the son of John Molloy. Stuart Handley writing in the Oxford Dictionary of National Biography casts doubt on tentative accounts of his early life. He entered Lincoln's Inn in 1667, and Gray's Inn in 1669. There is evidence he was called to the bar, and practised as a barrister.

He died in Crane Lane Court, Fleet Street, London in 1690.

== Works ==
Molloy was the compiler of an extensive treatise on maritime law and commerce, entitled De Jure Maritimo et Navali. It was successful despite its derivative nature: its content was not much advance on the Consuetudo vel Lex Mercatoria by Gerard Malynes, and the coverage of law concerning bills of exchange was said by a later author to be inferior to the treatise of John Marius. It was a standard work on the subject, till superseded by the publications of James Allan Park, Samuel Marshall, and Lord Tenterden. Its importance was its orientation towards the perspective of merchants.

Molloy also published Holland's Ingratitude, or a Serious Expostulation with the Dutch, London, 1666.

== See also ==
- Froinsias Ó Maolmhuaidh (aka Francis Molloy), grammarian

== Notes ==
Attribution

This article incorporates text from a publication now in the public domain: Porter, Bertha (1894). "Molloy, Charles (1646-1690)". In Lee, Sidney (ed.). Dictionary of National Biography. Vol. 37. London: Smith, Elder & Co.
