= Patrick O'Loughran =

Patrick O'Loughran (in Irish: Pádraig Ó Lochráin) (died 1 February 1612) was a priest of the archdiocese of Armagh and an Irish Catholic Martyr.

O'Loughran was born in Donaghmore, County Tyrone to an Erenagh family. He left Ireland for Flanders to pursue his education some time before the Flight of the Earls in September 1607. He administered the sacraments to exiled Irish noblemen who had fled to the Spanish Netherlands, and attended the Irish College, Douai, where he met Hugh O'Neill, Earl of Tyrone. He later became spiritual director to the exiled Earl and Catherine O'Neill, Countess of Tyrone, with both of whom he traveled to Rome.

O'Loughran returned to Ireland in June 1611 and was arrested upon landing in Cork City. Under interrogation, O'Loughran admitted that he had given sacraments to exiled members of the Gaelic nobility of Ireland, and that he had assisted the Irish bishop, Blessed Conor O'Devany. Upon his confession he was committed to a dungeon and in January 1612, he and Bishop O'Devany were condemned to death. Fr O'Loughran's closeness to The O'Neill Mór appears to have been the reason behind the government's decision to single him out.

On 1 February 1612, they were brought from Dublin Castle to George's Hill. The bishop asked to die last so that he could provide Father O'Loughran moral support in his moments before death, but the request was refused. Father O'Loughran replied: "Aid me by your prayers with God, by whose help I am sure that neither death, nor life, nor principalities, nor powers, nor things present, nor things to come, nor anything else, will separate me from the love of Christ or from my companionship with you." Bishop O'Devany knelt to pray for O'Loughran before they were both drawn and quartered. Their bravery and faith inspired the crowd to surge forward to acquire relics.

== Legacy ==
The remains were buried on George's Hill but disinterred the following night and given honourable burial. They were buried ‘with other martyrs’ at St James Churchyard. O'Loughran and O'Devany were beatified by Pope John Paul II in September 1992 and 15 other Irish Catholic Martyrs. Their feast day is on 20 June.

The Roman Catholic Archdiocese of Armagh marked the 400th Anniversary of the Death of Blessed Patrick O’Loughran with a Mass at Blessed Patrick O’Loughran Primary School, Castlecaulfield.
