= Barnabe Rich =

English author and soldier

Barnabe Rich (also Barnaby Riche, Barnabe Rych (1614), Barnabee Rych (1614)) (c. 1540 – 10 November 1617) was an English writer and soldier, and a distant relative of Lord Chancellor Rich.

== Life ==
He fought in the Low Countries, rising to the rank of captain, and afterwards served in Ireland. He shared in the colonization of Ulster, and spent the latter part of his life near Dublin. In the intervals of his campaigns he produced many pamphlets on political questions and romances. In 1606 he was in receipt of a pension of half a crown a day, and in 1616 he was presented with a gift of £100 as being the oldest captain in the service.

== Works ==
His best-known work is Riche His Farwell to the Militarie Profession | Riche his Farewell to Militarie Profession conteining verie pleasaunt discourses fit for a peaceable tyme (1581). Of the eight stories contained in it, five, he says, are forged only for delight, neither credible to be believed, nor hurtful to be perused. The three others are translations from the Italian. He claims as his own invention the story of Apolonius and Silla, the second in the collection, from which Shakespeare took the plot of Twelfth Night. It is, however, founded on the tale of Nicuola and Lattantio as told by Matteo Bandello. The eighth, Phylotus and Emilia, a complicated story arising from the likeness and disguise of a brother and sister, is identical in plot with the anonymous play, Philotus, printed in Edinburgh in 1603. Both play and story were edited for the Bannatyne Club in 1835, by David Irving.

In the conclusion to his collection Rich tells a story of a devil named Balthasar, who possesses a king of Scots, prudently changed after the accession of James I to the Grand Turk. The Strange and Wonderful Adventures of Don Simonides, a Gentleman Spaniard (1581), with its sequel The Second Tome of the Travels and Adventures of Don Simonides (1584), is written in imitation of Lyly. Among his other romances should be mentioned The Adventures of Brusanus, Prince of Hungaria (1592).

His authenticated works number twenty-four, and include works on Ireland, the troubles of which were, according to him, due to the religion of the people and to the lack of consistency and firmness on the part of the English government. Such are: Allarme to England (1578); A New Description of Ireland (1610); and The Irish Hubbub, or the English Hue and Crie (1617), in which he also inveighs against the use of tobacco.
