= Geoffrey Baron (rebel) =

Irish lawyer (1607–51)

Geoffrey Barron (1607–51) was an Irish lawyer.

Geoffrey Barron was born in Clonmel, Co. Tipperary, in 1607, the eldest son of Laurence Barron and Mary Wadding, Catholic landowners. He studied at Middle Temple in London during the reign of Charles I and as a lawyer became known for his eloquence and scholarship. Elected MP for Clonmel in 1634, he was among those who voiced their opposition to the withholding of concessions granted to Irish Catholics six years earlier. From 1642 onwards, Barron was actively involved with the Catholic confederates of Ireland and became their appointed delegate to the court of France. Barron served as treasurer for the Irish Confederation, and throughout his career enjoyed a high character for probity and sincere devotion to Catholicism. Barron was not a rebel, but acted in defence of his religious beliefs to defend Charles I against parliament. He strongly opposed the surrender of Limerick to the army of the parliament of England in 1651, and was consequently one of those excepted from pardon for life and estate by a special clause in the treaty of capitulation. When parliamentary troops entered Limerick in October 1651, Baron voluntarily surrendered himself, and was sentenced to death by a court of officers, presided over by the lord-deputy, Henry Ireton. Edmund Ludlow, lieutenant-general of cavalry, recorded that, in reply to Ireton, Barron answered "that it was not just to exclude him from mercy, because he had been engaged in the same cause" as the parliamentarians "pretended to fight for, the liberty and religion of his country." Hanged, beheaded and quartered at Limerick, Barron went to his death with tremendous courage. He wore his best suit of clothes in the belief that his soul "departed from this body, did straight enjoy the pleasures of heaven" and it was "the least of his duty" to grant "this last livery" to his earthly remains, "the relict companion of the soul".Geoffrey's younger brother, Bonaventure Barron, achieved great renown as a Franciscan scholar in Rome.
