= 1577 in Ireland =

- Centuries: 14th; 15th; 16th; 17th; 18th
- Decades: 1550s; 1560s; 1570s; 1580s; 1590s
- See also: Other events of 1577; List of years in Ireland

Events from the year 1577 in Ireland.

== Incumbent ==
- Monarch: Elizabeth I

== Events ==
- January 11 – Palesmen sends delegates to England to complain of the burden of the cess.
- June – James FitzMaurice FitzGerald is in Spain plotting rebellion in Ireland with the support of Pope Gregory XIII.
- October 25 – Brian O'Rourke agrees with Sir Nicholas Malby (Lord President of Connaught) for payment to the English crown for his lordship of West Bréifne.
- November – the Great Comet of 1577 is visible.
- November/December – Massacre of Mullaghmast: The Ó Moores and O'Connors have most of their fine (or ruling families) massacred by English soldiers at Mullaghmast (County Kildare) having been invited there for peace talks.
- Athenry is sacked by the Mac an Iarla, the sons of the Richard Burke (Ulick and John). This follows their previous attack in 1572.

== Deaths ==
- January 4 – William Walsh, Roman Catholic Bishop of Meath (b. c.1512)
- Richard Talbot, judge (b. c.1520)
