= Concubhair Mac Bruideadha =

Concubhair Mac Bruideadha (fl. 1636) was an Irish poet and a man of letters.

A son of Maoilin Óg Mac Bruideadha (died 1602); both of their names occur frequently in the Inchiquin manuscripts, and were closely connected to the Earls of Thomond and their family.

Concubhair’s reputation as a man of letters was acknowledged in 1636, when his approbation and signature were sought by Brother Mícheál Ó Cléirigh for the Annals of the Four Masters. His signature reads: Mac Bruaideadha .i. Concobhar, mac Maoilin óicc, á Chill Caoidhe 7 ó Leitir Mhaoláin.

== See also ==
- Seán Buí Mac Bruideadha, Irish poet, fl. 14th century.
- Diarmuid Mac Bruideadha, died 1563.
- Maoilin Mac Bruideadha, brother of the above, died 1582.
- Maoilin Óg Mac Bruideadha, son of the above, died 1602.
- Tadhg mac Dáire Mac Bruaideadha, c.1570-1652.
