= 1580 in Ireland =

- Centuries: 14th; 15th; 16th; 17th; 18th
- Decades: 1560s; 1570s; 1580s; 1590s; 1600s
- See also: Other events of 1580; List of years in Ireland

Events from the year 1580 in Ireland.

== Incumbent ==
- Monarch: Elizabeth I

== Events ==
- Second Desmond Rebellion: Thomas Butler, 3rd Earl of Ormonde, Sir William Pelham and Sir George Carew are sent to Munster to subdue the rebels and destroy the Desmond lands in Limerick, Cork and north Kerry.
- March – Siege of Carrigafoyle Castle: English troops under Sir William Pelham take the castle from Irish and Spanish supporters of the Second Desmond Rebellion.
- 14 March – Miler Magrath is deposed as Roman Catholic Bishop of Down and Connor by Pope Gregory XIII for heresy, having for a decade simultaneously held bishoprics in the Protestant Church of Ireland.
- July – Fiach McHugh O'Byrne from the Wicklow Mountains launches a new phase of the Second Desmond Rebellion in the east.
- 25 August – Battle of Glenmalure in the Second Desmond Rebellion: An Irish Catholic force made up of the Gaelic clans led by Fiach McHugh O'Byrne and James Eustace, Viscount Baltinglass of the Pale, defeat the English Army under the Lord Deputy of Ireland, Lord Grey, at the O'Byrne's mountain stronghold of Glenmalure. Francis Cosby is among the English dead.
- 10 September – Italian and Spanish troops sent by Pope Gregory XIII to aid the Second Desmond Rebellion and commanded by Sebastiano di San Giuseppi land at Smerwick on the Dingle Peninsula.
- 7 October–10 October – Siege of Smerwick: The Papal forces are besieged at Dún an Óir by the English Army and surrender. At least 400 are massacred on Lord Grey's orders. Walter Ralegh is present.
- William mac an Iarla Burke and his followers are hanged outside the walls of Galway by William Óge Martyn, High Sheriff of County Galway, in person, who, aware that the Mayor of Galway, Dominick Lynch, has a pardon for Burke, prevents the Mayor from arriving in time to stop the executions.
- Walter Ball (Alderman) became Mayor of Dublin. He is notorious for imprisoning his Catholic mother (who died in jail) as part of the imposition of the Reformation in Ireland.

== Deaths ==
- 20 June – Roland de Burgo, Bishop of Clonfert.
- 25 August - Peter Carew killed in the Battle of Glenmalure
- Richard II de Bermingham, Anglo-Irish lord.
