= 1582 in Ireland =

- Centuries: 14th; 15th; 16th; 17th; 18th
- Decades: 1560s; 1570s; 1580s; 1590s; 1600s
- See also: Other events of 1582; List of years in Ireland

Events from the year 1582 in Ireland.

== Incumbent ==
- Monarch: Elizabeth I

== Events ==
- April – after three years of scorched earth warfare, the provost marshal of Munster, Sir Warham St Leger, estimates that 30,000 people died of famine in his province during the previous six months and hundreds are dying in Cork.
- July – Lord Grey, Lord Deputy of Ireland, is recalled to England. Sir Henry Wallop and Adam Loftus, Archbishop of Dublin, are appointed lords justices responsible for the government of Ireland to succeed him.
- September – Fiach McHugh O'Byrne surrenders, ending the Second Desmond Rebellion in Leinster.
- Ulick Burke secures succession to his father as 3rd Earl of Clanricarde by murdering his brother, John of the Shamrocks, and affirming his loyalty to Queen Elizabeth I of England.

== Births ==
- approx. date – Ambrose Ussher, Church of Ireland clergyman and Biblical scholar (d. 1629)

== Deaths ==
- 13 April – Nicholas Nugent, former Chief Justice of the Irish Common Pleas (b. c. 1525) (hanged for treason).
- 24 July – Richard Burke, 2nd Earl of Clanricarde, peer.
- John of Desmond, rebel noble (killed in skirmish).
- Maoilin Mac Bruideadha, poet.

== Arts and literature ==
- March – traditional melody Cailín Óg a Stór first on record.
- Annal Memoranda Gadelica begins.
