= 1581 in Ireland =

- Centuries: 14th; 15th; 16th; 17th; 18th
- Decades: 1560s; 1570s; 1580s; 1590s; 1600s
- See also: Other events of 1581; List of years in Ireland

Events from the year 1581 in Ireland.

== Incumbent ==
- Monarch: Elizabeth I

== Events ==
- April 19 – general pardon offered to participants in the Second Desmond Rebellion (other than the leaders).
- Dermot O'Hurley appointed Archbishop of Cashel by Pope Gregory XIII, but is unable to enter Ireland until 1583 when he was imprisoned in Dublin Castle and hanged for treason in 1584.
- John Derricke publishes The Image of Irelande, with a Discoverie of Woodkarne.

== Births ==
- January 4 – James Ussher, Anglican Archbishop of Armagh and Primate of All Ireland, published the Ussher chronology purporting to time and date creation (died 1656).

== Deaths ==
- Nicholas Sanders, English Catholic priest and an exiled leader of the Second Desmond Rebellion (b. c.1530).
