= Maoilin Mac Bruideadha =

Irish poet, died 1582

Maoilin Mac Bruideadha, Irish poet, died 1582.

Maoilin succeeded his brother, Diarmuid Mac Bruideadha, as head of the family and ollamh to O Brian. He was succeeded by his son, Maoilin Óg.

The name is now anglicized as Mac Brody or Brody.

== See also ==
- Seán Buí Mac Bruideadha, fl. 14th century.
- Diarmuid Mac Bruideadha, died 1563.
- Maoilin Óg Mac Bruideadha, nephew of the above, died 1602.
- Concubhair Mac Bruideadha, son of the above, alive 1636.
- Tadhg mac Dáire Mac Bruaideadha, c.1570-1652.
