= 1578 in Ireland =

- Centuries: 14th; 15th; 16th; 17th; 18th
- Decades: 1550s; 1560s; 1570s; 1580s; 1590s
- See also: Other events of 1578; List of years in Ireland

Events from the year 1578 in Ireland.

== Incumbent ==
- Monarch: Elizabeth I

== Events ==
- In retaliation for the Massacre of Mullaghmast, Rory Óg Ó Moore, leader of the Ó Moore clan in County Laois, burns Carlow, but is hunted down and trapped.
- The ship Emanuel, returning from Martin Frobisher's third voyage to Frobisher Bay, is wrecked at Ard na Caithne.
- Barnabe Rich publishes Alarme to England [sic].

== Births ==
- 14 December – Joan Apsley, first wife of Richard Boyle, 1st Earl of Cork (d. 1599)

== Deaths ==
- June – Rory Óg Ó Moore, rebel leader (killed and beheaded).
