= 1576 in Ireland =

- Centuries: 14th; 15th; 16th; 17th; 18th
- Decades: 1550s; 1560s; 1570s; 1580s; 1590s
- See also: Other events of 1576; List of years in Ireland

Events from the year 1576 in Ireland.

== Incumbent ==
- Monarch: Elizabeth I

== Events ==
- 9 March – Walter Devereux, Earl of Essex, is appointed Earl Marshal of Ireland.
- April – Sir Henry Sidney, Lord Deputy of Ireland, shires Connacht into counties Galway, Mayo, Roscommon and Sligo.
- June – the rebel sons of Richard Burke, Earl of Clanricarde, attack Athenry. They are captured and imprisoned in Dublin but escape.
- 20 June – Sir William Drury is appointed President of Munster.
- September – the Earl of Essex returns to Dublin but dies within three weeks of dysentery.

== Births ==
- Approximate date – Anthony Lynch, Dominican (d. after 1636)

== Deaths ==
- 22 September – Walter Devereux, Earl of Essex, Earl Marshal of Ireland (b. 1541)
