= 1570 in Ireland =

- Centuries: 14th; 15th; 16th; 17th; 18th
- Decades: 1550s; 1560s; 1570s; 1580s; 1590s
- See also: Other events of 1570; List of years in Ireland

Events from the year 1570 in Ireland.

== Incumbent ==
- Monarch: Elizabeth I

== Events ==
- January – William Oge Martyn is kidnapped by the Earl of Thomond.
- April – Battle of Shrule occurs.
- October 10 – Sir Edmund Butler of Cloughgrenan surrenders his estate to Elizabeth I of England in exchange for a pardon for his rebellion.

== Births ==
- Col Ciotach, adventurer of Clan Donald, Laird of Colonsay (d. 1647)
- Tadhg mac Dáire Mac Bruaideadha, Gaelic poet and historian (d. 1652)
