= 1579 in Ireland =

- Centuries: 14th; 15th; 16th; 17th; 18th
- Decades: 1550s; 1560s; 1570s; 1580s; 1590s
- See also: Other events of 1579; List of years in Ireland

Events from the year 1579 in Ireland.

== Incumbent ==
- Monarch: Elizabeth I

== Events ==
- July 16 – James FitzMaurice FitzGerald lands with a small force of Irish, Spanish, and Italian troops at Smerwick on the Dingle Peninsula and commences the Second Desmond Rebellion against the rule in Ireland of Elizabeth I of England. The rebellion lasts until 1583 and results in the extinction of the Desmond palatinate. Brian O'Rourke joins.
- August 21 – County Cavan is officially established following an agreement between Lord Deputy Henry Sidney and King Aodh Connallach Ó Raghallaigh of East Breifne.
- November 13 – Desmond's troops sack Youghal during the Second Desmond Rebellion
- East Breifne is renamed Cavan (Irish An Cabhain) after the Shire's main town.
- William Oge Martyn attempts to capture or kill the pirate Gráinne O'Malley at her stronghold of Rockfleet.

== Deaths ==
- June 4 – Edmund Tanner (b.c. 1526), an Irish Jesuit, Roman Catholic Bishop of Cork and Cloyne, Ireland, from 1574 to 1579.
- August 31 – Patrick O'Hely, Roman Catholic Bishop of Mayo (executed by the English).
