= Glenquin Castle =

- Caisleán Ghleann an Choim (Irish)
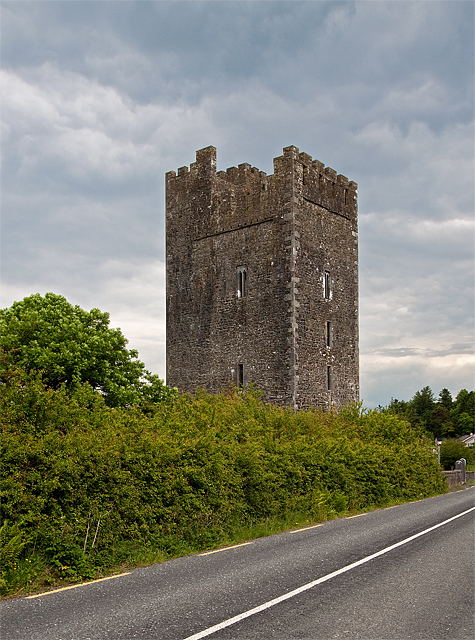

- Location within Ireland
- 52.383931°N 9.106752°W
- Type: Tower house
- Location: Killeedy, County Limerick, Ireland

History
- Built: 1462

National monument of Ireland
- Official name: Glenquin Castle
- Reference no.: 268

Glenquin Castle is a tower house and National Monument located in County Limerick, Ireland.

== Location ==
Glenquin Castle is located 2.4 km (1.5 mi) west of Killeedy, on the north side of the R515 road.

== History ==
The tower house was built in 1462 by the Ó hAilgheanáin (O'Hallinans), on the site of an older building dating back to AD 983. It was taken by the Uí Briain (O'Briens), and during the Desmond Rebellions (1569) it fell to the Geraldines until the Crown confiscated their lands in 1571. The castle was partly demolished by Walter Raleigh. By 1587 it was in the hands of the Hungerford; in 1591 it went to Sir William Courtenay, and in 1595 to a Captain Collum.

It was restored by William Courtenay, 10th Earl of Devon in 1840.

At the 1916 Easter Rising, 300 Irish Volunteers assembled at Glenquin Castle, but they did not take any military action.

It was restored again in the 1980s and is under the care of the Office of Public Works.

== Castle ==
The castle is a square, crenellated, six storey limestone tower house. On the top floor of there are the remains of stilts used by archers. There are also two barrel vaulted rooms.

== In song ==
A song "O Castle of Glenquin" praises the castle and its history.
