= 1574 in Ireland =

- Centuries: 14th; 15th; 16th; 17th; 18th
- Decades: 1550s; 1560s; 1570s; 1580s; 1590s
- See also: Other events of 1574; List of years in Ireland

Events from the year 1574 in Ireland.

== Incumbent ==
- Monarch: Elizabeth I

== Events ==
- May 8 – Brian O'Neill of Clandeboye, having submitted to the Earl of Essex, begs Elizabeth I of England for mercy.
- July 18 – the Geraldine chiefs sign the Combination, promising to support Gerald FitzGerald, 15th Earl of Desmond, unconditionally.
- September 2 – Desmond submits to William FitzWilliam (Lord Deputy) at Cork following a month's campaign in Munster during which his castle at Derinlaur has been taken.
- September – Essex campaigns against Turlough Luineach O'Neill.
- November
  - Essex meets Brian O'Neill of Clandeboye at his castle of Edendubhcarrig (County Antrim) where at least 200 of the clan O'Neill are treacherously massacred at a feast while O'Neill himself, his wife and brother are captured, taken to Dublin, executed and quartered. The Lordship of Clandeboye is partitioned in three by the English.
  - The rebel Rory O'More is briefly imprisoned.
- November 5 – Edmund Tanner (d. 1579 in Ireland) is appointed Roman Catholic Bishop of Cork and Cloyne and consecrated in Rome.

== Births ==
- Thomas Fitzmaurice, 18th Baron Kerry, soldier (d. 1630)
- Stephen White, Jesuit scholar (d. 1646)

== Deaths ==
- November – Brian O'Neill of Clandeboye, clan chieftain
