= 1565 in Ireland =

- Centuries: 14th; 15th; 16th; 17th; 18th
- Decades: 1540s; 1550s; 1560s; 1570s; 1580s
- See also: Other events of 1565; List of years in Ireland

Events from the year 1565 in Ireland.

== Incumbent ==
- Monarch: Elizabeth I

== Events ==
- Shane O'Neill, at this time claiming allegiance to Elizabeth I of England, defeats MacDonnells at Glenshesk.
- Butlers and Fitzgeralds fight a pitched battle against each other at the Battle of Affane (February) in County Waterford. Sir Edmund Butler of Cloughgrenan wounds and takes prisoner Gerald FitzGerald, 15th Earl of Desmond and drives his followers from the field. John Plunket is appointed to inquire into the causes of the dispute.
- Shane O'Neill marches from Antrim through the mountains by Clogh to the neighbourhood of Ballycastle, where he routs the clan MacDonnell of Antrim and Dunnyveg at the Battle of Glentasie (2 May) and takes Sorley Boy MacDonnell and James MacDonald, 6th of Dunnyveg, prisoner, the latter dying of wounds soon afterwards. Ballycastle Castle and Dunluce Castle also fall to him.
- Sir Henry Sidney takes up the post of Lord Deputy of Ireland (October).
- Connacht is shired into counties Clare (formerly Thomond), Galway, Leitrim (separated from Roscommon), Mayo and Galway.
- Donald McCarthy Mór is created 1st (and only) Earl of Clancare and Baron Valencia in the Peerage of Ireland (24 June) as part of the surrender and regrant of Ireland to the English Crown.
- Connor O'Brien, 3rd Earl of Thomond, surrenders his claim to the lordship of Thomond on condition of receiving Corcomroe.
- Miler Magrath is appointed Roman Catholic Bishop of Down and Connor (12 October; consecrated 4 November).
- First ever Jesuit school is established at Limerick by David Wolfe, apostolic visitor of the Roman Catholic Church, but this is dispersed by the royal authorities in October.
- Possible date of introduction of the potato to Ireland by John Hawkins (after September).

== Births ==
- Con MacShane O'Neill, flaith (d. 1630)

== Deaths ==
- January 2 – Joan Fitzgerald, Countess of Ormond, Norman-Irish noblewoman and heiress (b. 1509/14)
- May 2 – Angus MacDonnell, son of Alexander MacDonnell.
- c. May – James MacDonald, 6th of Dunnyveg, Scoto-Irish chieftain.
