= Seán Buí Mac Bruideadha =

Irish poet

Seán Buí Mac Bruideadha, Irish poet, fl. 14th century.

Seán Buí Mac Bruideadha who wrote a poem to Mathghamhain Maonmhaighe Ó Briain (died 1369), Dlighidh ollamh urraim ríogh.

The name is now anglicised as Mac Brody or Brody.

== See also ==
- Diarmuid Mac Bruideadha, died 1563.
- Maoilin Mac Bruideadha, brother of the above, died 1582.
- Maoilin Óg Mac Bruideadha, son of the above, died 1602.
- Concubhair Mac Bruideadha, son of the above, alive 1636.
- Tadhg mac Dáire Mac Bruaideadha, c.1570-1652.
