= 1575 in Ireland =

- Centuries: 14th; 15th; 16th; 17th; 18th
- Decades: 1550s; 1560s; 1570s; 1580s; 1590s
- See also: Other events of 1575; List of years in Ireland

Events from the year 1575 in Ireland.

== Incumbent ==
- Monarch: Elizabeth I

== Events ==
- Walter Devereux, Earl of Essex, has members of the clan O'Neill killed at Banbridge.
- March 16 – Edmund O'Donnell is hanged, drawn and quartered in Cork as a traitor, the first Jesuit executed by the English government.
- May–August – drought.
- May 22 – Elizabeth I of England orders Essex to break off his enterprise of the plantation of Antrim. He will return to England at the end of the year.
- June – Essex builds a bridge and fort at Blackwater (north of Armagh).
- June 27 – Turlough Luineach O'Neill submits to the English authorities and receives extensive grants of lands and permission to employ 300 Scottish mercenaries.
- July 20–26 – Rathlin Island Massacre: English adventurers Francis Drake and John Norreys, acting for the Earl of Essex, lead an expedition that culminates in the massacre of 500 of the clan MacDonnell in a surprise raid on Rathlin Island.
- August–September – Plague in Leinster.
- August 5 – Sir Henry Sidney is reappointed Lord Deputy of Ireland following the resignation of Sir William FitzWilliam.

== Deaths ==
- March 16 – Edmund O'Donnell, Jesuit (b. 1542)
- November 27 – Sir Peter Carew, English adventurer in Ireland (b. 1514?)
- Christopher Barnewall, statesman (b. 1522)

== Arts and literature ==
- Approximate date – the manuscript now known as Royal Irish Academy, MS 23 N 10 is copied at Ballycumin, County Roscommon, by Aodh, Dubhthach and Torna of the Ó Maolconaire family.
