= 1585 in Ireland =

- Centuries: 14th; 15th; 16th; 17th; 18th
- Decades: 1560s; 1570s; 1580s; 1590s; 1600s
- See also: Other events of 1585; List of years in Ireland

Events from the year 1585 in Ireland.

== Incumbent ==
- Monarch: Elizabeth I

== Events ==
- January – Sorley Boy MacDonnell lands at Cushendun with a substantial army, but after initial successes is driven back to Scotland.
- 26 April – 25 May – Parliament of Ireland meets in Dublin with Sir Nicholas Walsh as Speaker of the Irish House of Commons. Gerald FitzGerald, 11th Earl of Kildare, is permitted to take his seat.
- April – Roman Catholic recusants in Clonmel are betrayed and seized at Passion Sunday mass by troops of John Norreys, Lord President of Munster, and the celebrant, fugitive priest Maurice MacKenraghty, gives himself up, is immediately tried under martial law as a traitor, and executed. His head is set up in Clonmel market place and his body buried behind the high altar of the Franciscan convent.
- 15 July – Composition of Connacht: A commission is given to Sir Richard Bingham, governor of Connacht, and others to make agreements with landowners in the province by 3 October. Murrough na dTuadh Ó Flaithbheartaigh is recognised as Chief of the Name of Ó Flaithbertaigh in Galway.
- July–August – Sir John Perrot, Lord Deputy of Ireland, is in Ulster; he confirms agreement between the O'Neill dynasty on 10 August and establishes County Coleraine (as the County of Colerain) and County Monaghan.
- October – Sorley Boy MacDonnell, having returned to Ireland, recaptures Dunluce Castle.
- 16 November – Gerald FitzGerald, 11th Earl of Kildare, dies in exile in London and is succeeded by his son Henry FitzGerald.
- 14 December – Nicholas Walsh, Church of Ireland Bishop of Ossory, is stabbed to death in his house in Kilkenny by a disaffected member of his flock.
- December – Munster Plantation planned.
- Tadhg mac Diarmata, last de facto King of Magh Luirg, is succeeded by Brian na Carriag MacDermot, first to be styled "MacDermot of the Carrick".

== Arts and literature ==
- Tuileagna Ó Maoil Chonaire composes the poem Labhram ar iongnaibh Éireann.
- Máel Sechnaill Ruadh Ó Braonáin of Galway is recorded as one of the last harpers of the period in Connacht.

== Births ==
- Thomas Preston, 1st Viscount Tara, soldier (d. 1655)
- Possible date – Sir Dominick Browne, merchant and landowner (d. c.1656)

== Deaths ==
- 30 April – Maurice MacKenraghty, Roman Catholic priest and martyr.
- 16 November – Gerald FitzGerald, 11th Earl of Kildare (b. 1525)
- 14 December – Nicholas Walsh, Church of Ireland Bishop of Ossory and biblical translator.
