= 1584 in Ireland =

- Centuries: 14th; 15th; 16th; 17th; 18th
- Decades: 1560s; 1570s; 1580s; 1590s; 1600s
- See also: Other events of 1584; List of years in Ireland

Events from the year 1584 in Ireland.

== Incumbent ==
- Monarch: Elizabeth I

== Events ==
- July – English government commissions a survey of Munster, following the Desmond Rebellions. Sir Valentine Browne is appointed to the task. It becomes known as the Peyton Survey after Sir Christopher Peyton
- The Spanish Arch is built in Galway.
- Perrott subdivides Cavan into seven baronies.
- Richard Stanihurst's history De rebus in Hibernia gestis is published by Christophe Plantin in Antwerp.

== Deaths ==
- 20 June – Dermot O'Hurley, Roman Catholic Archbishop of Cashel, put to death for treason. (b. c. 1530)
- Margaret Ball, died of deprivation in the dungeons of Dublin Castle, beatified in 1992 (b. 1515)
- Sir Henry Colley, or Cowley, an Irish soldier and landowner.
