= 1589 in Ireland =

- Centuries: 14th; 15th; 16th; 17th; 18th
- Decades: 1560s; 1570s; 1580s; 1590s; 1600s
- See also: Other events of 1589; List of years in Ireland

Events from the year 1589 in Ireland.

== Incumbent ==
- Monarch: Elizabeth I

== Events ==
- 11 January – Richard Meredith nominated Church of Ireland Bishop of Leighlin (consecrated in April).
- Spring – Murrough na dTuadh Ó Flaithbheartaigh and Teige Ó Flaithbheartaigh lead a rebellion in Connacht. On 5 April a commission is issued to deal with the disturbances. Many of the rebel leaders are killed in an ambush at Easter.
- May – commission to inquire into progress on the Munster Plantation.
- 5 December – Sir Richard Bingham is cleared by the Lord Deputy and council of charges of misgovernment in Connacht and on 12 December is commissioned to prosecute the Burkes and other Connacht rebels.
- 23 December – Sir William FitzWilliam, acting for the Lord Deputy, begins a campaign against the Connacht rebels.

== Births ==
- Francis Kirwan, Roman Catholic Bishop of Killala (d. 1661)
- Theobald Stapleton, Roman Catholic priest and writer (d. 1647)

== Deaths ==
- February – John Fitzedmund Fitzgerald, seneschal of Imokilly.
- February? – Sir Valentine Browne, Surveyor General of Ireland and landowner.
- John Browne, cartographer and sheriff.
- Teige Ó Flaithbheartaigh, rebel leader.
- Christopher St Lawrence, 8th Baron Howth (b. after 1509)
