= 1583 in Ireland =

- Centuries: 14th; 15th; 16th; 17th; 18th
- Decades: 1560s; 1570s; 1580s; 1590s; 1600s
- See also: Other events of 1583; List of years in Ireland

Events from the year 1583 in Ireland.

== Incumbent ==
- Monarch: Elizabeth I

== Events ==
- Thomas Butler, 10th Earl of Ormond, assumes command of the Crown forces, contains remaining activists in the Second Desmond Rebellion to West Cork and Kerry and persuades many to surrender.
- Dermot O'Hurley, appointed Archbishop of Cashel in 1581, lands on Holmpatrick Strand in County Dublin.
- September – fugitive Roman Catholic priest Maurice MacKenraghty is surprised on Sliabh Luachra by Lord Roche's gallowglasses, handed over to the Earl of Ormond and sent to prison at Clonmel.
- 8 October – archbishop Dermot O'Hurley is arrested and imprisoned in Dublin Castle.
- 11 November
  - Gerald FitzGerald, 14th Earl of Desmond, is killed at Glenaginty in the Slieve Mish Mountains (near Tralee in County Kerry) by the Moriarty clan of Castledrum on the Dingle Peninsula, bringing an end to the Desmond Rebellions and resulting in the extinction of the Desmond palatinate.
  - John na Seamar Burke is ambushed and killed by his brother Ulick.
- Swords Castle briefly occupied by Dutch Protestants.

== Births ==
- Richard Nugent, 1st Earl of Westmeath, landowner and politician (k. 1642)

== Deaths ==
- February – Nicholas Skerrett, exiled Roman Catholic Archbishop of Tuam.
- 11 November
  - John na Seamar Burke, rebel.
  - Gerald FitzGerald, 14th Earl of Desmond, rebel.
- December – Thomas Lancaster, Church of Ireland Archbishop of Armagh.
