= 1590 in Ireland =

- Centuries: 14th; 15th; 16th; 17th; 18th
- Decades: 1570s; 1580s; 1590s; 1600s; 1610s
- See also: Other events of 1590; List of years in Ireland

Events from the year 1590 in Ireland.

== Incumbent ==
- Monarch: Elizabeth I

== Events ==
- 14 January - Sir William FitzWilliam, acting for the Lord Deputy, concludes his campaign against rebels in Connacht.
- Spring - Sir Richard Bingham, President of Connacht, occupies West Bréifne and the hereditary lord, Brian O'Rourke, flees; later this year the adjacent territory of Monaghan is seized by the crown after the execution at law of the resident lord, Aodh Rua Mac Mathúna.
- 3 September - As part of the O'Donnell Succession dispute the Battle of Doire Leathan is fought in County Donegal. Sir Donnell O'Donnell, one of the leading claimants to the title, is defeated and killed by forces backing his half-brother and rival Hugh Roe O'Donnell.
- Hugh Roe MacMahon, The MacMahon, resists the imposition of an English sheriff in County Monaghan; he is charged with treason, for which he will be executed, and his lordship divided.

== Births ==
- Thomas Carve, historian (d. 1672?)
- John de Burgh, Roman Catholic Archbishop of Tuam (d. 1667)
- Owen Roe O'Neill, soldier (d. 1649)
- Approximate date - Mícheál Ó Cléirigh, chronicler; chief author of the Annals of the Four Masters (d. 1643)

== Deaths ==
- March - Elizabeth Clinton, Countess of Lincoln, noblewoman (b. 1527)
- 5 August - Maol Muire Ó hÚigínn, Roman Catholic Archbishop of Tuam.
- Thomas Fitzmaurice, 16th Baron Kerry.
- Sorley Boy MacDonnell, established the MacDonnell clan in County Antrim, resisted attempts by Shane O'Neill and the English to expel them (b. c.1505)
