= Máel Sechnaill Ruadh Ó Braonáin =

Máel Sechnaill Ó Braonáin was an Irish harper

Máel Sechnaill Ó Braonáin (fl. 1581–1585) was an Irish harper.

Ó Braonáin is listed in the fiants in 1581 as Mac Loughlin roe O’Brennan, County Galway, and in 1585 as Melaghlin roe O’Brennan, County Galway. He is one of the last harpers to be named in late medieval Connacht.

It is unknown if he was of the same family as Donnchad Clereach Ó Maol Braonáin (cleric and musician, died 1343).
