= 1572 in Ireland =

- Centuries: 14th; 15th; 16th; 17th; 18th
- Decades: 1550s; 1560s; 1570s; 1580s; 1590s
- See also: Other events of 1572; List of years in Ireland

Events from the year 1572 in Ireland.

== Incumbent ==
- Monarch: Elizabeth I

== Events ==
- First Desmond rebellion ends (started in 1568).
- Sack of Athenry by the Mac an Iarlas.

== Births ==
- Hugh Roe O'Donnell, Prince of Tyrconnell, helped to lead the Nine Years War (d. 1602).
