= 1586 in Ireland =

- Centuries: 14th; 15th; 16th; 17th; 18th
- Decades: 1560s; 1570s; 1580s; 1590s; 1600s
- See also: Other events of 1586; List of years in Ireland

Events from the year 1586 in Ireland.

== Incumbent ==
- Monarch: Elizabeth I

== Events ==
- 23 September – Battle of Ardnaree in County Mayo: English troops under Sir Richard Bingham, governor of Connacht, defeat an Irish-Scottish mercenary army – led by the brothers Donald Gorm MacDonald of Carey and Alexander Carragh MacDonald of Glenarm (both of whom are killed) – fighting on behalf of the rebel Mac Philbins and Burkes.
- c. December? – Richard Creagh, Roman Catholic Archbishop of Armagh, dies a prisoner in the Tower of London.
- County Longford is shired, separating it from Westmeath.
- Robert Gardiner is appointed Lord Chief Justice of Ireland.
- Sir Edward Waterhouse is appointed Chancellor of the Exchequer of Ireland.
- Elizabeth I of England and James VI of Scotland agree in the Treaty of Berwick that the MacDonnell family, claimants to the Glens of Antrim, have the right to stay in Ireland.

== Births ==
- Antony Hickey, Franciscan theologian (d. 1641)
- William St Leger, Anglo-Irish landowner and military commander (d. 1642)

== Deaths ==
- 5 May – Henry Sidney, Lord Deputy of Ireland (b. 1529)
- c. December? – Richard Creagh, Roman Catholic Archbishop of Armagh (b. c.1523)
