= 1573 in Ireland =

- Centuries: 14th; 15th; 16th; 17th; 18th
- Decades: 1550s; 1560s; 1570s; 1580s; 1590s
- See also: Other events of 1573; List of years in Ireland

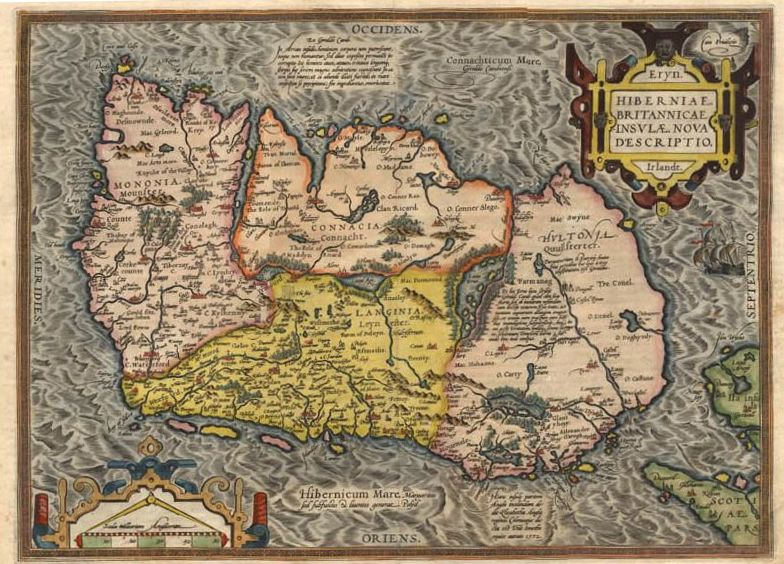
1573 map of Ireland

Events from the year 1573 in Ireland.

== Incumbent ==
- Monarch: Elizabeth I

== Events ==
- February 23 – James FitzMaurice FitzGerald submits to John Perrot, Lord Deputy of Ireland, at Kilmallock.
- March 25 – Gerald FitzGerald, 15th Earl of Desmond, returns to Ireland. He is detained in Dublin but escapes about 11 November.
- April 14 – grant of denization to Sorley Boy MacDonnell and other settlers from Scotland.
- May – Brian O'Neill of Clandeboye burns Carrickfergus.
- June – a warrant is given for the restoration of his lands to Connor O'Brien, 3rd Earl of Thomond.
- July 9 – Elizabeth I of England grants Walter Devereux, Earl of Essex, the right to plant most of County Antrim. He sets out with a military force (including Moyses Hill) from England to do so, but his ships are dispersed by storm.
- September 29 – Essex is granted a commission of "general captainship in all Ulster". His troops encamp for the winter at Belfast while opposition is gathered by Brian O'Neill and Turlough Luineach O'Neill.
- October 20 – Planter Thomas Smith the younger is shot in Ards.
- October – Essex and Hugh O'Neill, Earl of Tyrone, act against Brian O'Neill.
- c. October – David Wolfe, papal legate to Ireland, goes to Spain.
- Walter Ball, who subsequently became Mayor of Dublin and imprisoned his mother Margaret Ball on religious grounds, becomes an Alderman of Dublin.

== Births ==
- David Rothe, Roman Catholic Bishop of Ossory

== Deaths ==
- December 27 – James Stanihurst, politician
- Robert Weston, Dean of the Arches and Lord Chancellor of Ireland (b. 1515)
- Approximate date – Arthur O'Friel, Roman Catholic cleric
