= 1566 in Ireland =

- Centuries: 14th; 15th; 16th; 17th; 18th
- Decades: 1540s; 1550s; 1560s; 1570s; 1580s
- See also: Other events of 1566; List of years in Ireland

Events from the year 1566 in Ireland.

== Incumbent ==
- Monarch: Elizabeth I

== Events ==
- April 25 – Shane O'Neill seeks aid for his cause from Charles IX of France.
- c. June – negotiations between Archibald Campbell, 5th Earl of Argyll (chief of the Clan Campbell) and Shane O'Neill over the captivity of Sorley Boy MacDonnell.
- August 2 or 3 – Shane O'Neill is proclaimed a traitor and a price is put on his head.
- August – Shane O'Neill burns Armagh Cathedral in defiance of Archbishop Richard Creagh.
- September 6 – an English expedition under Colonel Edward Randolph sets out from Bristol for Lough Foyle.
- September 17–November 12 – Sir Henry Sidney, Lord Deputy of Ireland, campaigns against O'Neill in Armagh, Tír Eoghain and Tyrconnell, reaching Derry on October 12. Humphrey Gilbert serves under him at the start of the campaign.
- October 26 – Aodh mac Maghnusa Ó Domhnaill becomes king of Tír Chonaill and The O'Donnell in succession to his half-brother Calvagh O'Donnell.
- November – Shane O'Neill attacks the troops of Edward Randolph (who is killed) at Derry.

== Births ==
- October 13 – Richard Boyle, 1st Earl of Cork, Lord High Treasurer of Ireland (died 1643)
- Dominic Collins, Jesuit priest (d. 1602)
- 1566 or 1569 – Henry Fitzsimon, Jesuit controversialist (d. 1643 or 1645)

== Deaths ==
- October 26 – Calvagh O'Donnell, King of Tír Chonaill.
