= 1567 in Ireland =

- Centuries: 14th; 15th; 16th; 17th; 18th
- Decades: 1540s; 1550s; 1560s; 1570s; 1580s
- See also: Other events of 1567; List of years in Ireland

Events from the year 1567 in Ireland.

== Incumbent ==
- Monarch: Elizabeth I

== Events ==
- May 8 – Battle of Farsetmore is fought near Letterkenny in Donegal. Shane O'Neill, chief of the O’Neills of Tír Eoghain, is defeated by the MacDonnells led by Aodh mac Maghnusa Ó Domhnaill who thus free themselves from O’Neill overlordship.
- June 2 – Shane O'Neill is killed by the MacDonnells near Cushendun. O'Neill's head is severed and sent to the government in Dublin. His body is buried at CrossSkern Church in Ballyterrim townland, above Cushendun. He is succeeded as The O'Neill by his tanist, Turlough Luineach O'Neill.
- August 8 – Dr. Robert Weston is sworn in as Lord Chancellor of Ireland. Although a layman, he is also appointed Dean of St. Patrick's Cathedral, Dublin.

== Births ==
- Tiobóid na Long Bourke, 1st Viscount Mayo (born at sea), clan chief (d. 1629)
- Sir Paul Gore, 1st Baronet, politician and soldier (d. 1629)
- Eochaidh Ó hÉoghusa, poet (d. 1617)

== Deaths ==
- June 2 – Shane O'Neill, clan chief (b. c.1530)
- Cormac na Haoine MacCarthy Reagh, Prince of Carbery (b. 1490)
