= Domhnall mac Dáire Mac Bruaideadha =

Irish poet (1570–1652)

Domhnall mac Dáire Mac Bruaideadha (fl. c. 1600) was an Irish poet.

A brother of Tadhg mac Dáire Mac Bruaideadha (1570–1652), Domhnall is known as the composer of Ceolchair sin a chruit an riogh ...

- Also refer List of Irish poets and Irish poetry
