= 1571 in Ireland =

- Centuries: 14th; 15th; 16th; 17th; 18th
- Decades: 1550s; 1560s; 1570s; 1580s; 1590s
- See also: Other events of 1571; List of years in Ireland

Events from the year 1571 in Ireland.

== Incumbent ==
- Monarch: Elizabeth I

== Events ==
- February – John Perrot is made Lord President of Munster.
- February 3 – Miler Magrath is appointed Church of Ireland Archbishop of Cashel (being translated from Clogher) while simultaneously retaining the title of Roman Catholic Bishop of Down and Connor. He will retain his new post until his death in 1622.
- November – Sir Thomas Smith is granted a patent and indenture from Queen Elizabeth I to establish an English colony on 360,000 acres (145,690 ha) of land in north Down in the territory of the Clandeboye O’Neills.
- First printing in the Irish language in Dublin, Aibidil Gaoidheilge agus Caiticiosma, a primer printed by John Kearney.
- Glenquin Castle was confiscated by the Crown from the Geraldines.

== Births ==
- Henry I De Coursey (in Dublin)

== Deaths ==
- Gillaspick MacDonnell (Giolla Easpuig MacDomhnaill), a son of Colla MacDonnell. Killed by a bull in a bullfight.
