= Francis Cosby =

Francis Cosby (1510–1580) was an English soldier and settler in Ireland. He has been implicated in the Massacre of Mullaghmast.

== Life ==
He was the second son of John Cosby of Great Leake, Nottingham. He settled in Ireland in the reign of Henry VIII. He was active in fighting on the edge of the English Pale, and was commended by the Lord Deputies Edward Bellingham and Thomas Radclyffe, 3rd Earl of Sussex.

In 1558 Cosby was appointed general of the Kerne, and in 1562 was granted the suppressed abbey of Stradbally in Queen's County. In 1565 he became governor of Portlaoise, and seneschal of Queen's County.

He helped to massacre, although the degree of his responsibility is not clear, many of the O'Mores at Mullaghmast, near Athy, who had been summoned to the fortress on avowedly peaceful business. The date 1577 in the Annals of the Four Masters is contradicted in the Annals of Lough Cé which says 1567.

Cosby was not successful in repression in Queen's County. Rory Oge O'More was continually threatening him, and took his eldest son prisoner in 1577. The murder of Rory in the following year relieved Cosby; but the outbreak of the Desmond rebellion in 1580 saw him killed by the rebels at the battle of Glenmalure, 25 August 1580.

== Family ==
He was married to Lady Mary Seymour, daughter of Lord Protector Somerset., by whom he had three sons, Alexander, Henry, and Arnold.

He married Elizabeth Palmer, by whom he had one daughter. Alexander succeeded to the estates, received additional grants in Queen's County, and was, with his son Francis, killed at the battle of Stradbally Bridge on 18 May 1596. The estates subsequently passed to Richard, another son of Alexander, whose descendants still possess them. Arnold, Francis Cosby's second son, served under Robert Dudley, 1st Earl of Leicester in the Low Countries.
