= 1568 in Ireland =

- Centuries: 14th; 15th; 16th; 17th; 18th
- Decades: 1540s; 1550s; 1560s; 1570s; 1580s
- See also: Other events of 1568; List of years in Ireland

Events from the year 1568 in Ireland.

== Incumbent ==
- Monarch: Elizabeth I

== Events ==
- First Desmond rebellion starts (lasts until 1572).

== Births ==
- Henry Piers, landowner and politician (d. 1623)
