= 1587 in Ireland =

- Centuries: 14th; 15th; 16th; 17th; 18th
- Decades: 1560s; 1570s; 1580s; 1590s; 1600s
- See also: Other events of 1587; List of years in Ireland

Events from the year 1587 in Ireland.

== Incumbent ==
- Monarch: Elizabeth I

== Births ==
- Cahir O'Doherty, last Gaelic Lord of Inishowen (d. 1608)
