= 1588 in Ireland =

- Centuries: 14th; 15th; 16th; 17th; 18th
- Decades: 1560s; 1570s; 1580s; 1590s; 1600s
- See also: Other events of 1588; List of years in Ireland

Events from the year 1588 in Ireland.

== Incumbent ==
- Monarch: Elizabeth I

== Events ==
- 28 June – Sir Valentine Browne purchases estates, including the Lakes of Killarney, from the estate of Donald Maccarty, 1st Earl of Clancare.
- Autumn/Winter – at least 20 ships of the retreating Spanish Armada get washed up on the Irish coast and hundreds of sailors die. MacSweeney Bannagh gives assistance to La Girona at Killybegs but on 26 October she is wrecked off County Antrim with only 9 survivors from an estimated 1300 onboard (including survivors from earlier wrecks). Brian O'Rourke assists at least eighty survivors – including Francisco de Cuellar – to depart the country.
- Richard Boyle, 1st Earl of Cork and father of Robert Boyle, arrives in Ireland as an entrepreneur.
- Lord Deputy William Fitzwilliam becomes Lord Deputy of Ireland, succeeding John Perrot in that office.

== Births ==
- Luke Wadding, Franciscan friar and historian (d. 1657)
