= The Image of Irelande, with a Discoverie of Woodkarne =

1581 book by John Derricke

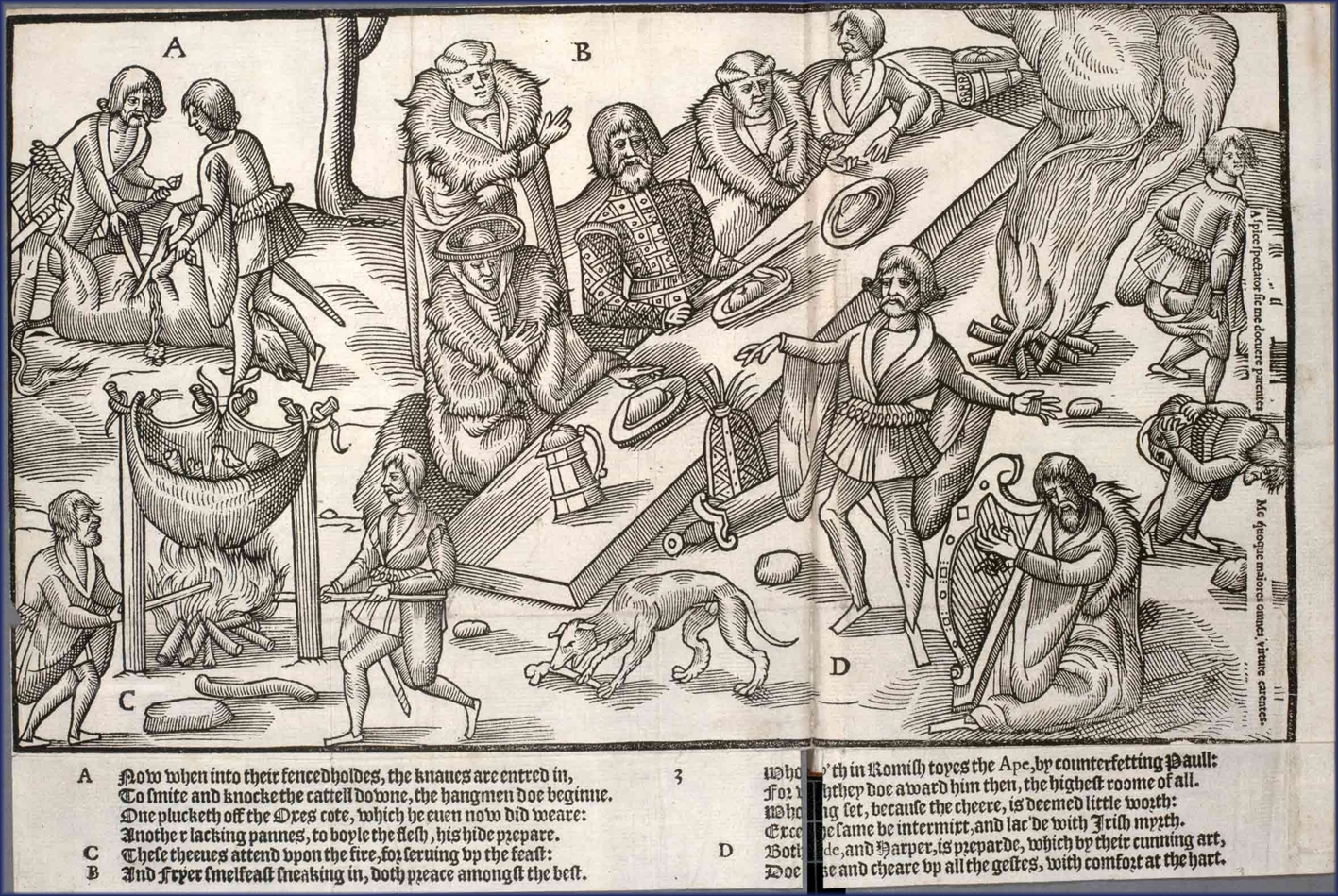
A scene showing a feast hosted by an Irish chieftain, probably the most famous scene from The Image of Irelande.

The Image of Irelande, with a Discoverie of Woodkarne is a 1581 book by John Derricke.

The book is dedicated to Philip Sidney. It praises the deputyship of Philip's father Henry Sidney and English victories over the Irish. The work opens with a poetic history of Ireland and its conflicts with the English, presenting reasons for English rule. This proceeds to a set of twelve woodcut illustrations interspersed with verse narration, describing Henry Sidney's victories against Irish rebels and denigrating Irish culture. The book ends with the surrender of Turlough Luineach Ó Neill, king of Tyrone, in 1578. Critics, such as James A. Knapp, have deemed the illustrations to be of far greater interest than the unremarkable verse.

There is only one complete version extant, at the Edinburgh University Library. A copy was produced and edited by the university librarian in 1883.

Pages from The Image of Irelande, with a Discoverie of Woodkarne

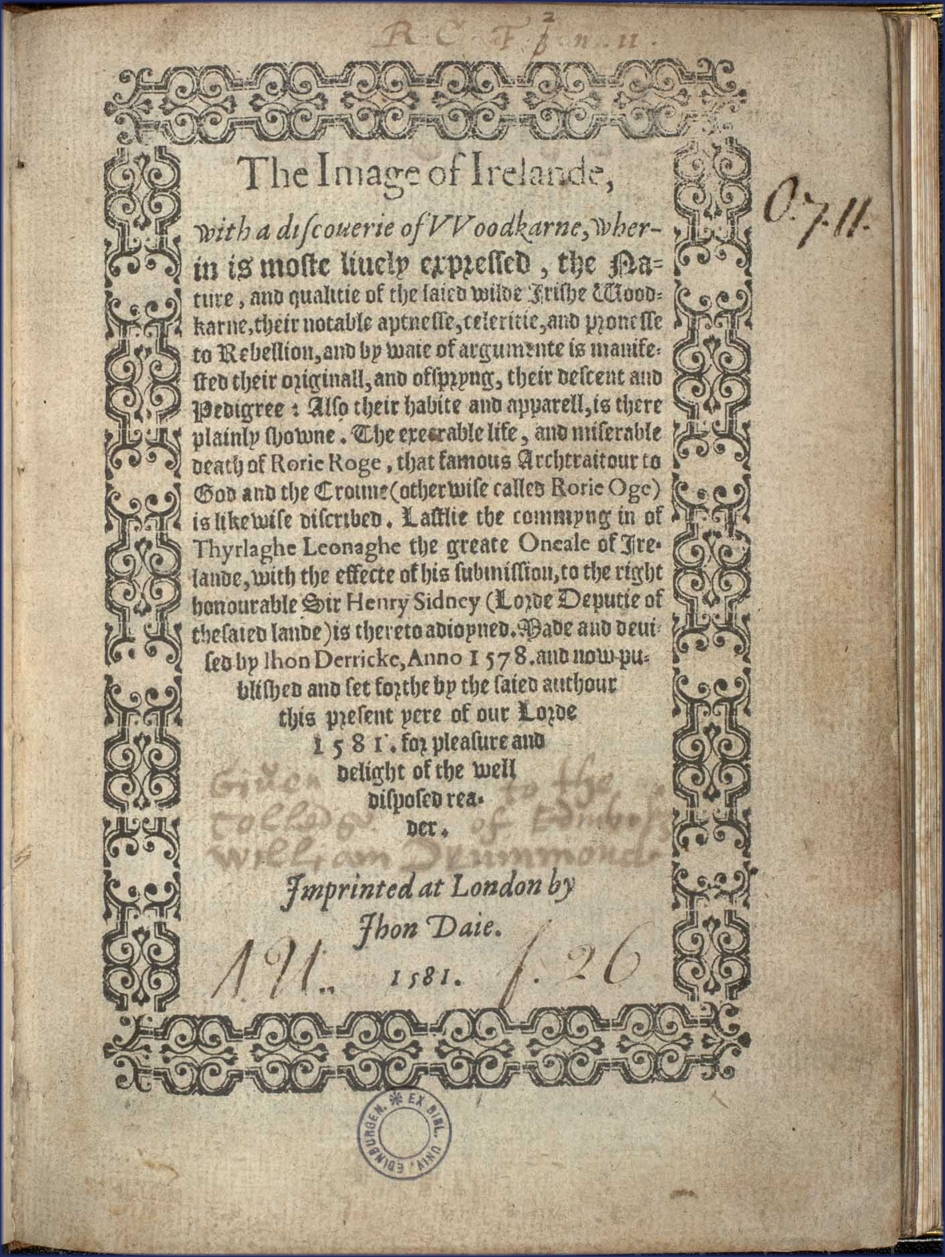
The Image of Irelande: title page showing the inscription of donation.

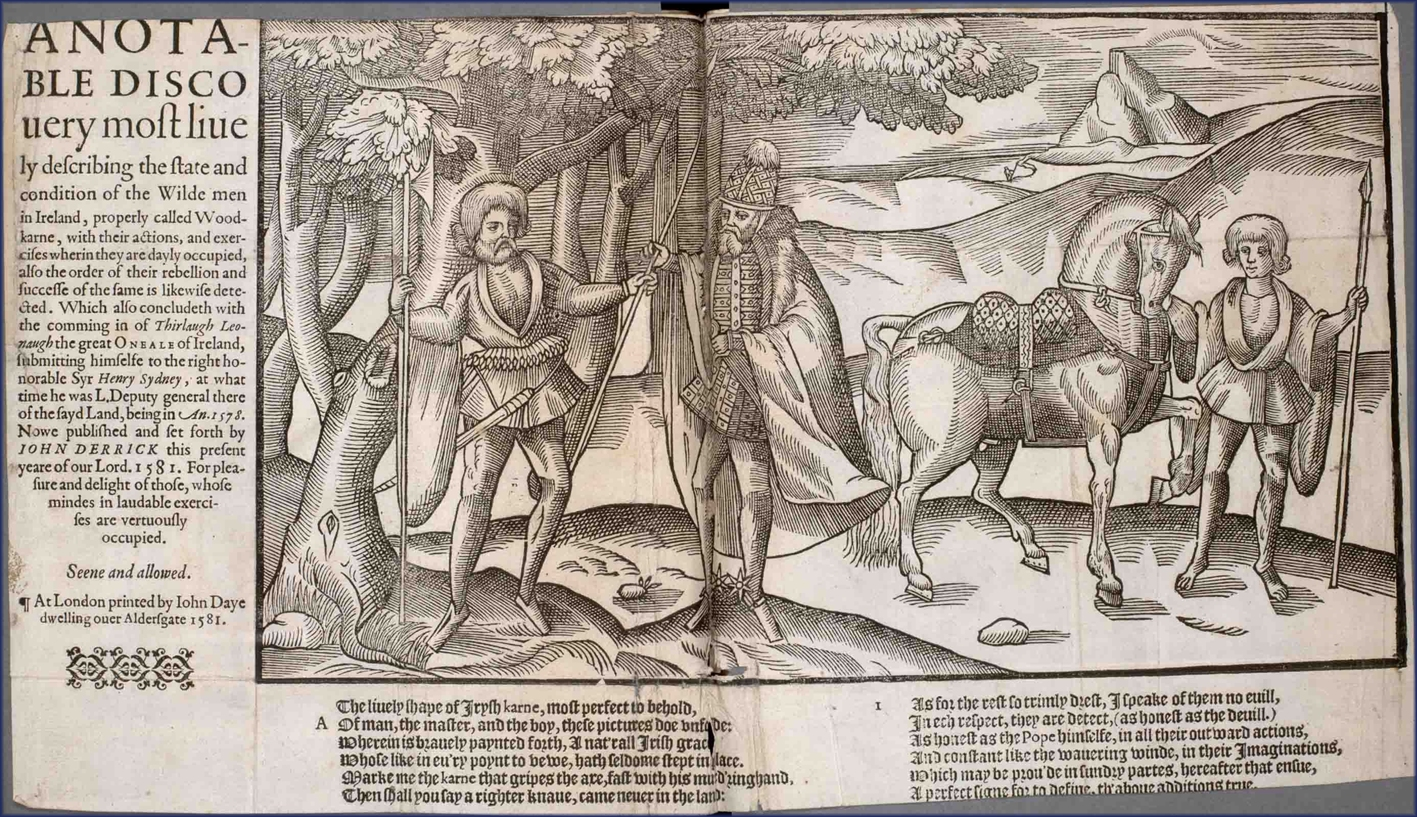
Plate 1. A soldier holding a battle-axe hands a spear to an Irish chieftain in full dress, with a page holding the chieftain's horse.

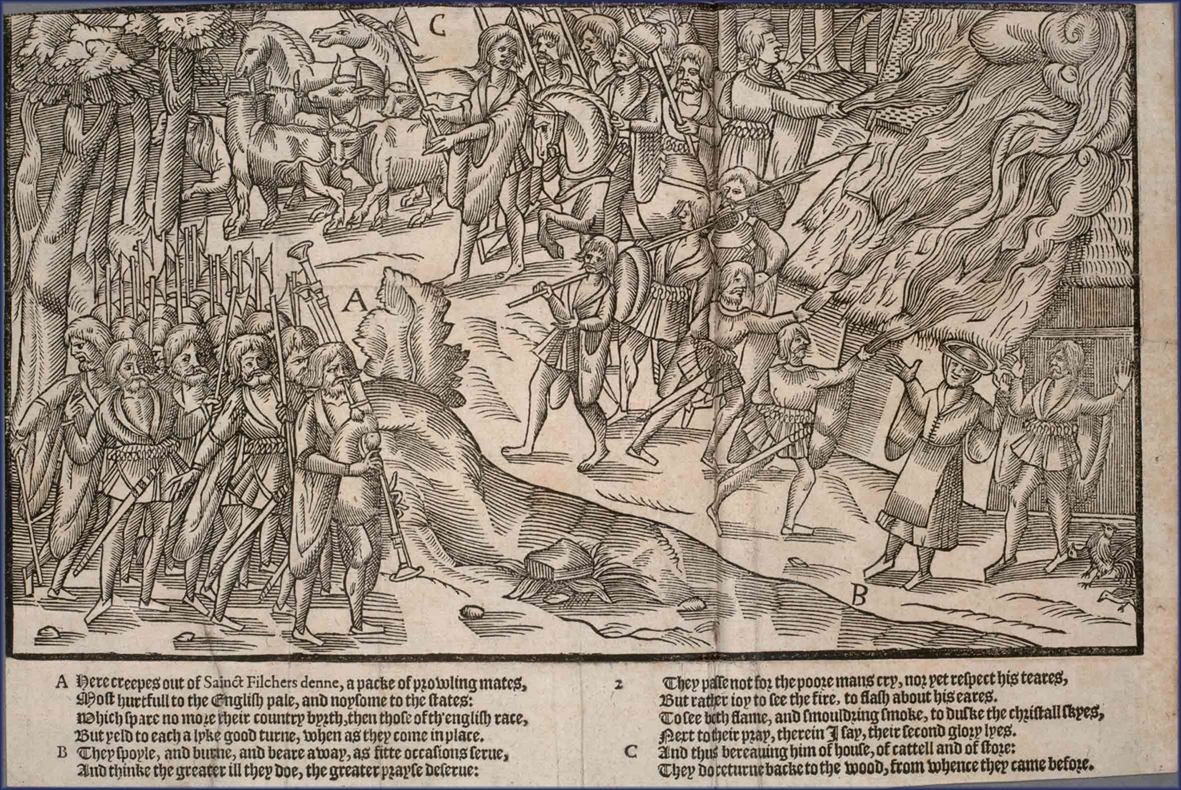
Plate 2. An armed company of the kerne, carrying halberds and pikes and led by a piper, attack and burn a farmhouse and drive off the horses and cattle.

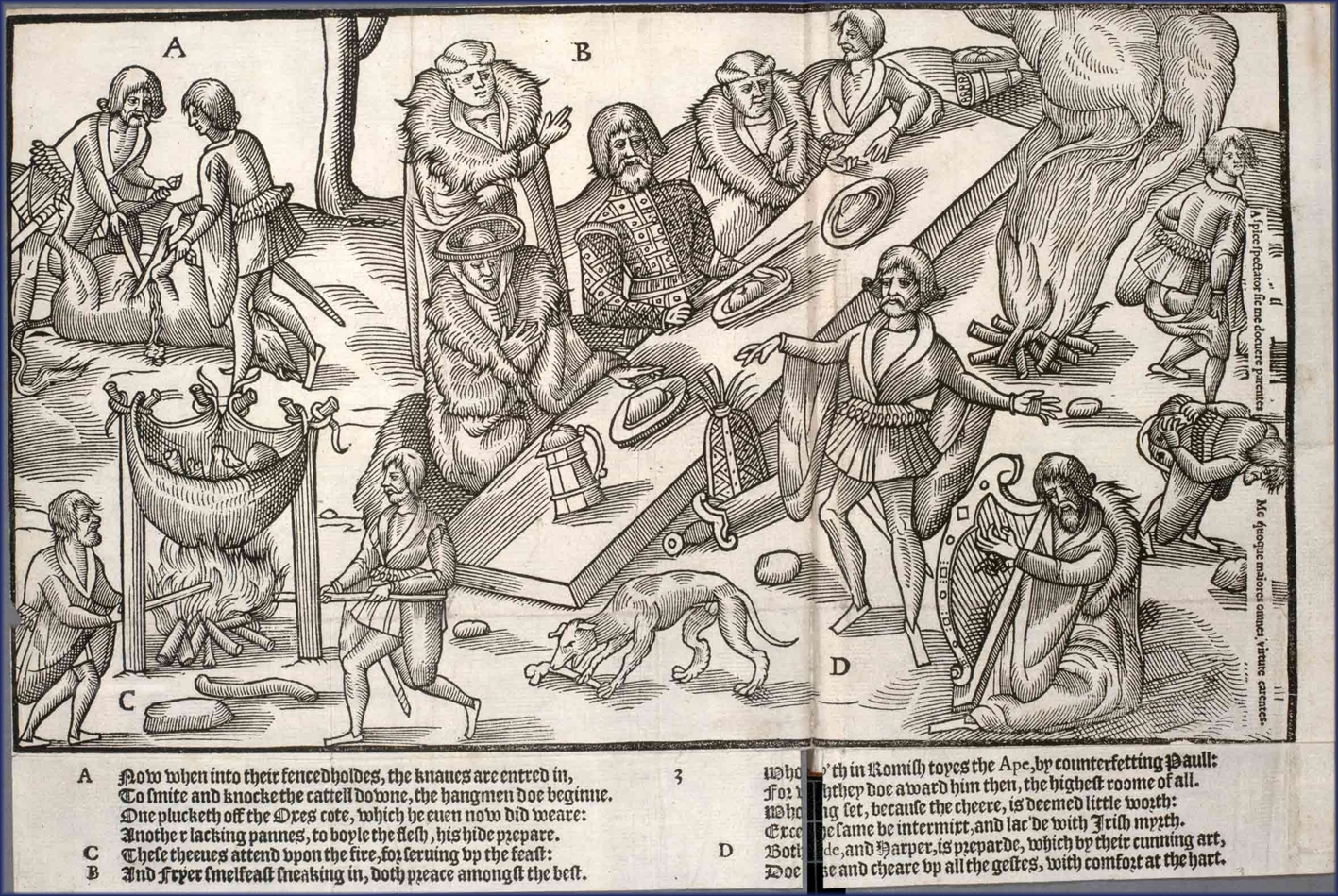
Plate 3. The most famous plate of the set shows the chief of the Mac Sweynes seated at an informal picnic while booleying, and being entertained by a bard, a harper and two flatulists.

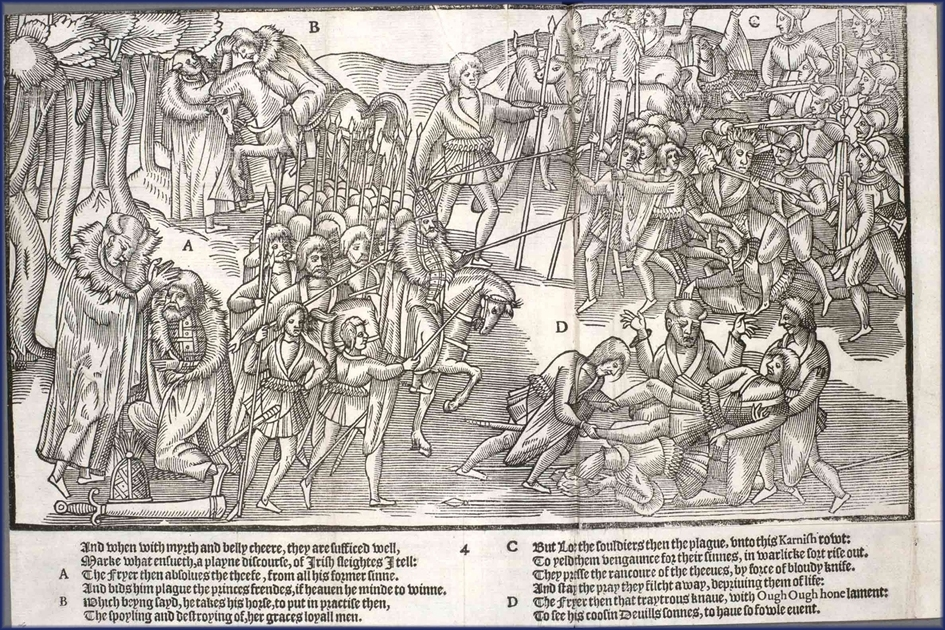
Plate 4. The Irish chieftain receives the priest's blessing before departing to fight the English, who are shown in full armour.

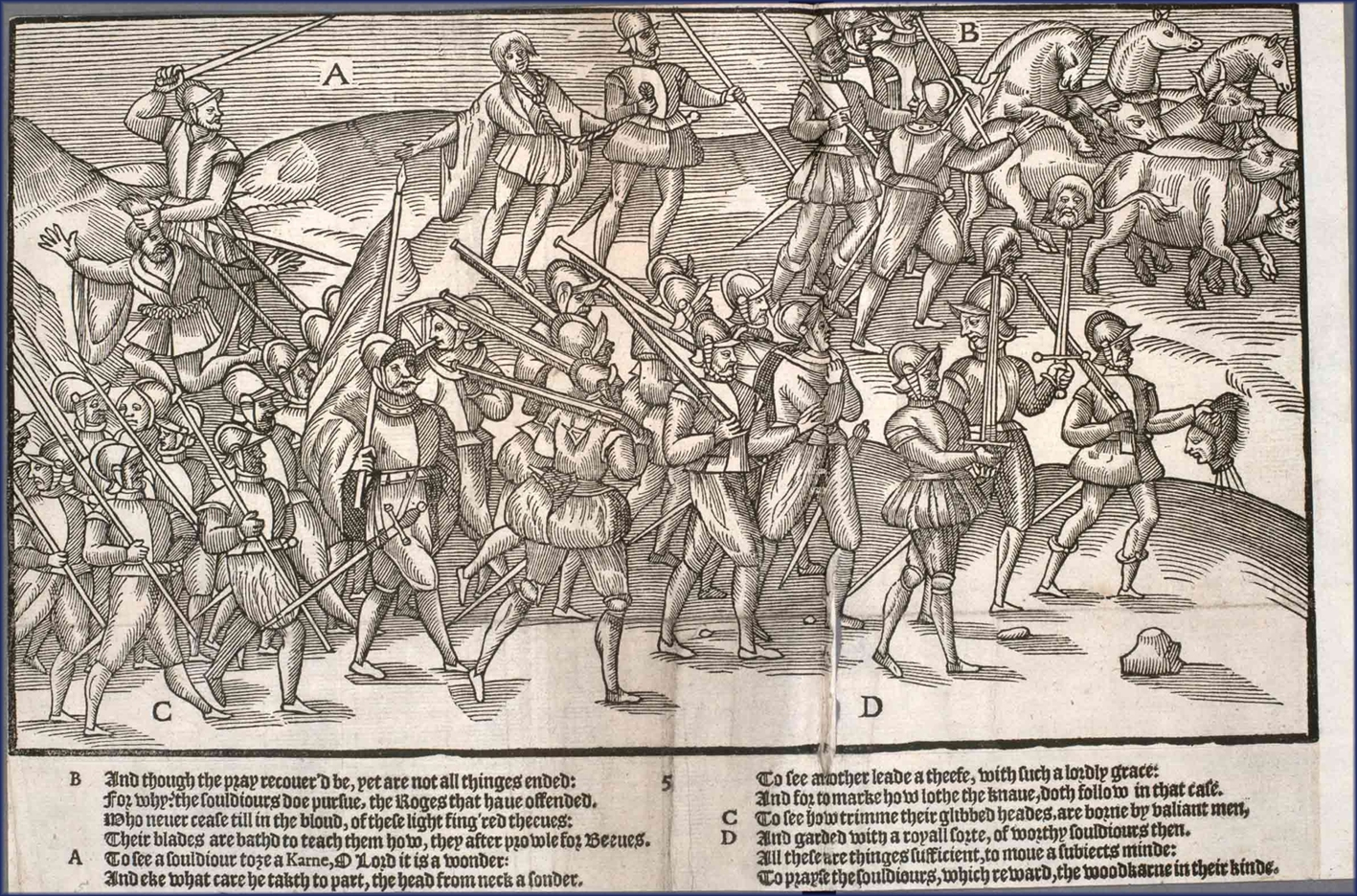
Plate 5. The English soldiers return in triumph, carrying severed Irish heads (the one on the right said to be Maighréad Maol O'Byrne, wife of Rory Óg O'More) and leading a captive by a halter.

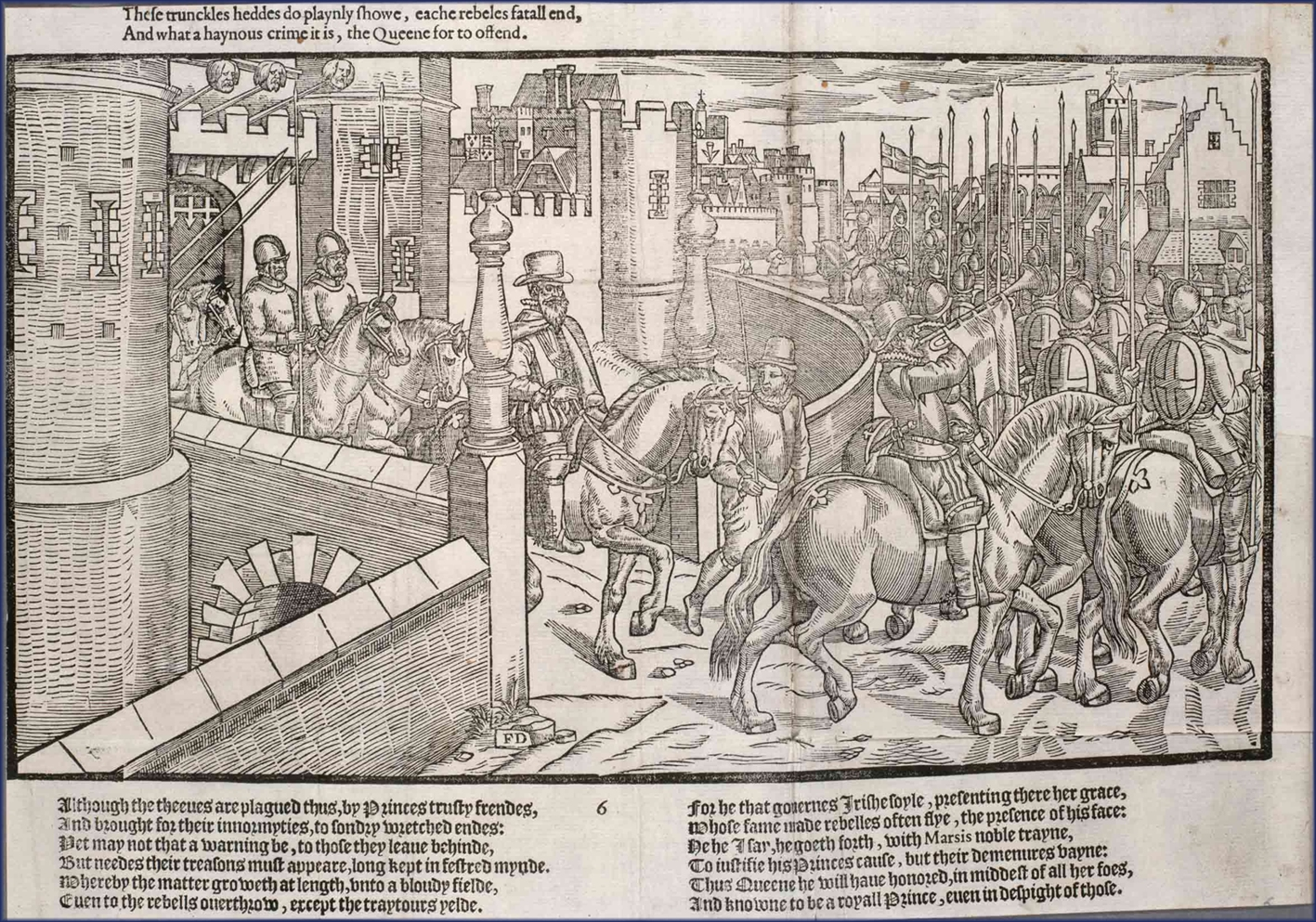
Plate 6. Sir Henry Sidney, Lord-Deputy, accompanied by an armed force, sets out from Dublin Castle for a progress through Ireland.

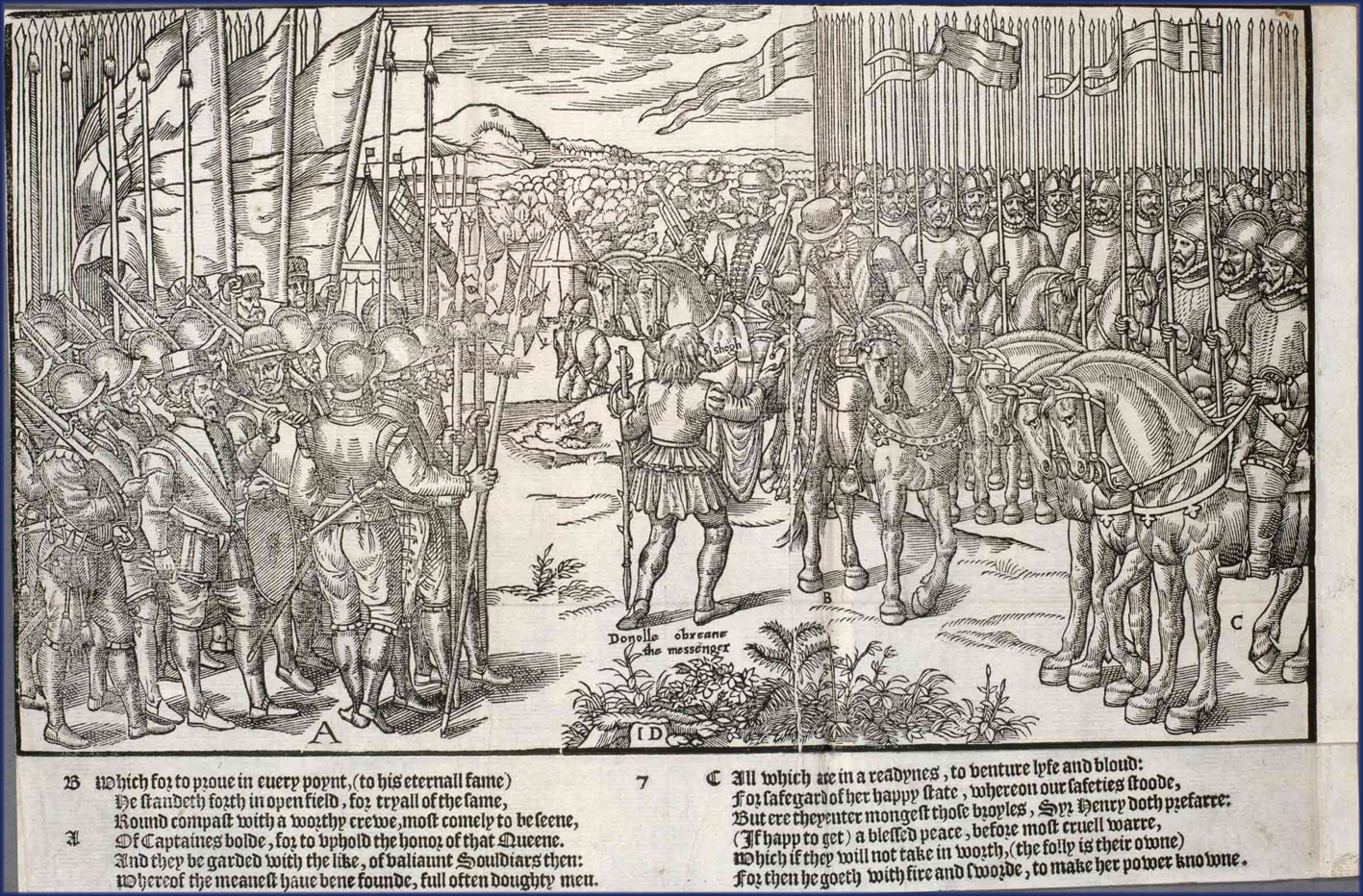
Plate 7. The English army is drawn up for battle, while Sidney himself parleys with a messenger from the Irish.

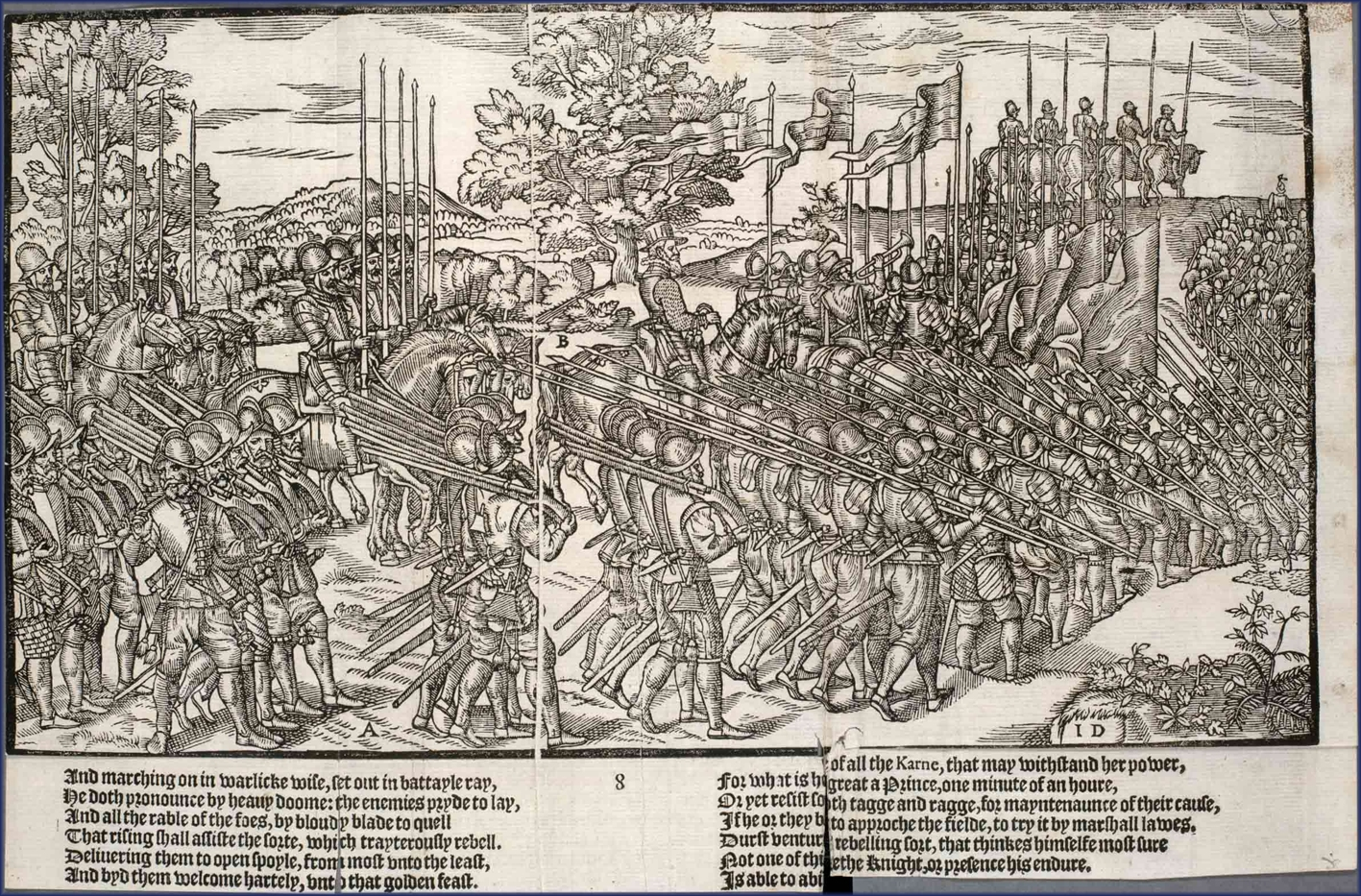
Plate 8. Sidney and the English army on the march with standards and trumpets.

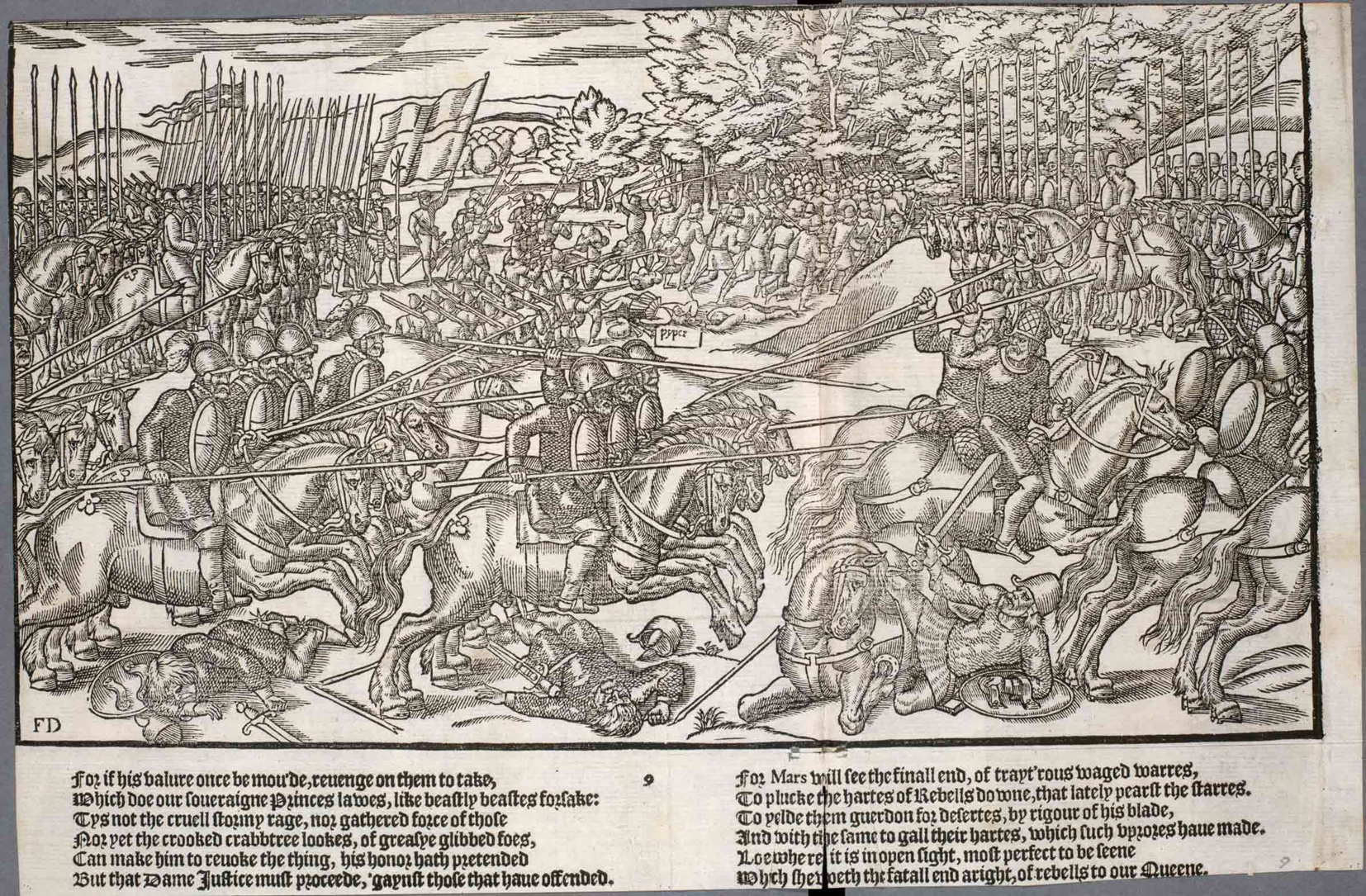
Plate 9. The English army puts the Irish army to flight. The piper is cut down with his pipes beside him.

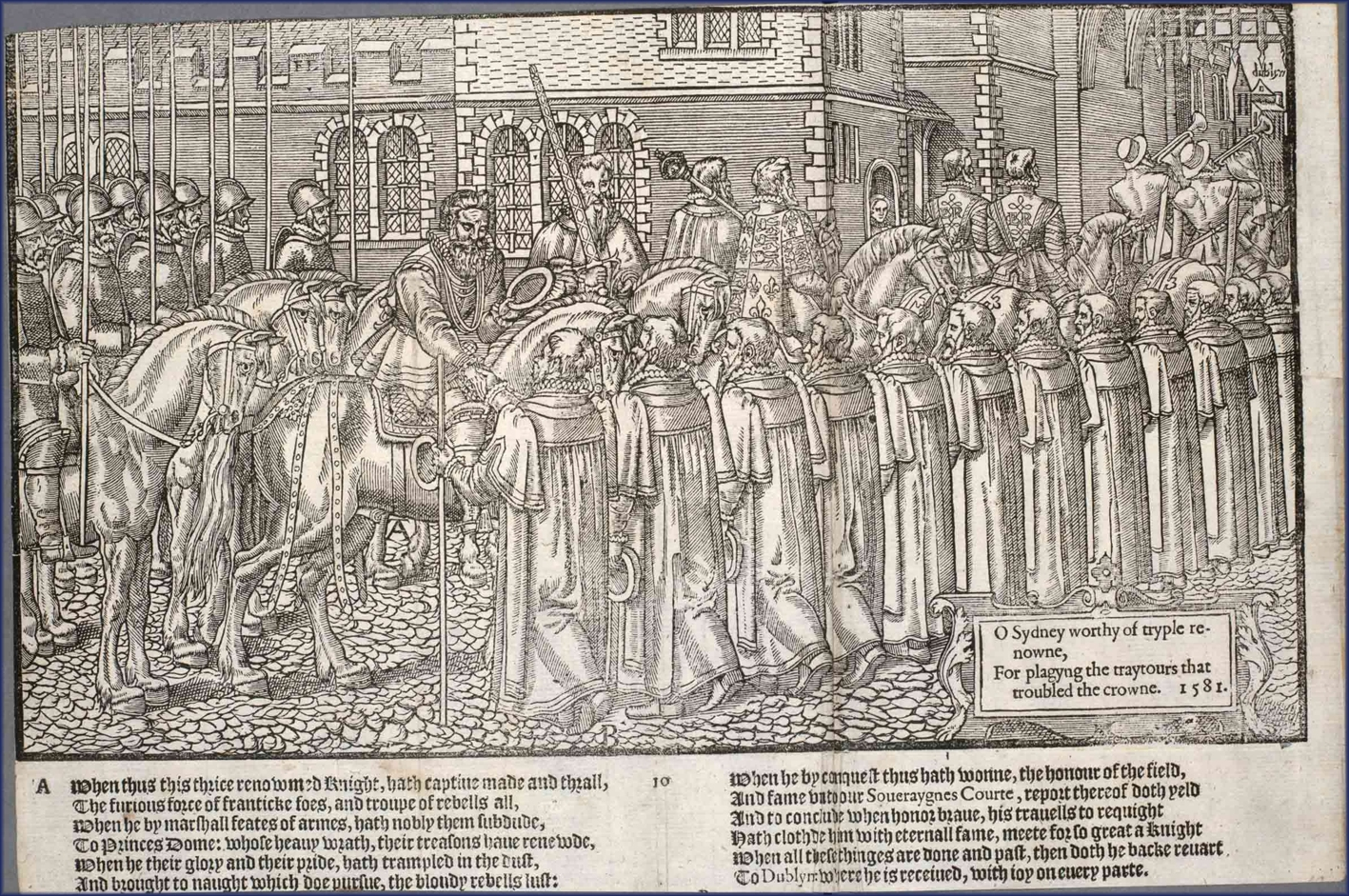
Plate 10. Sir Henry Sidney returns in triumph to Dublin Castle and is received by the Lord Mayor and Aldermen.

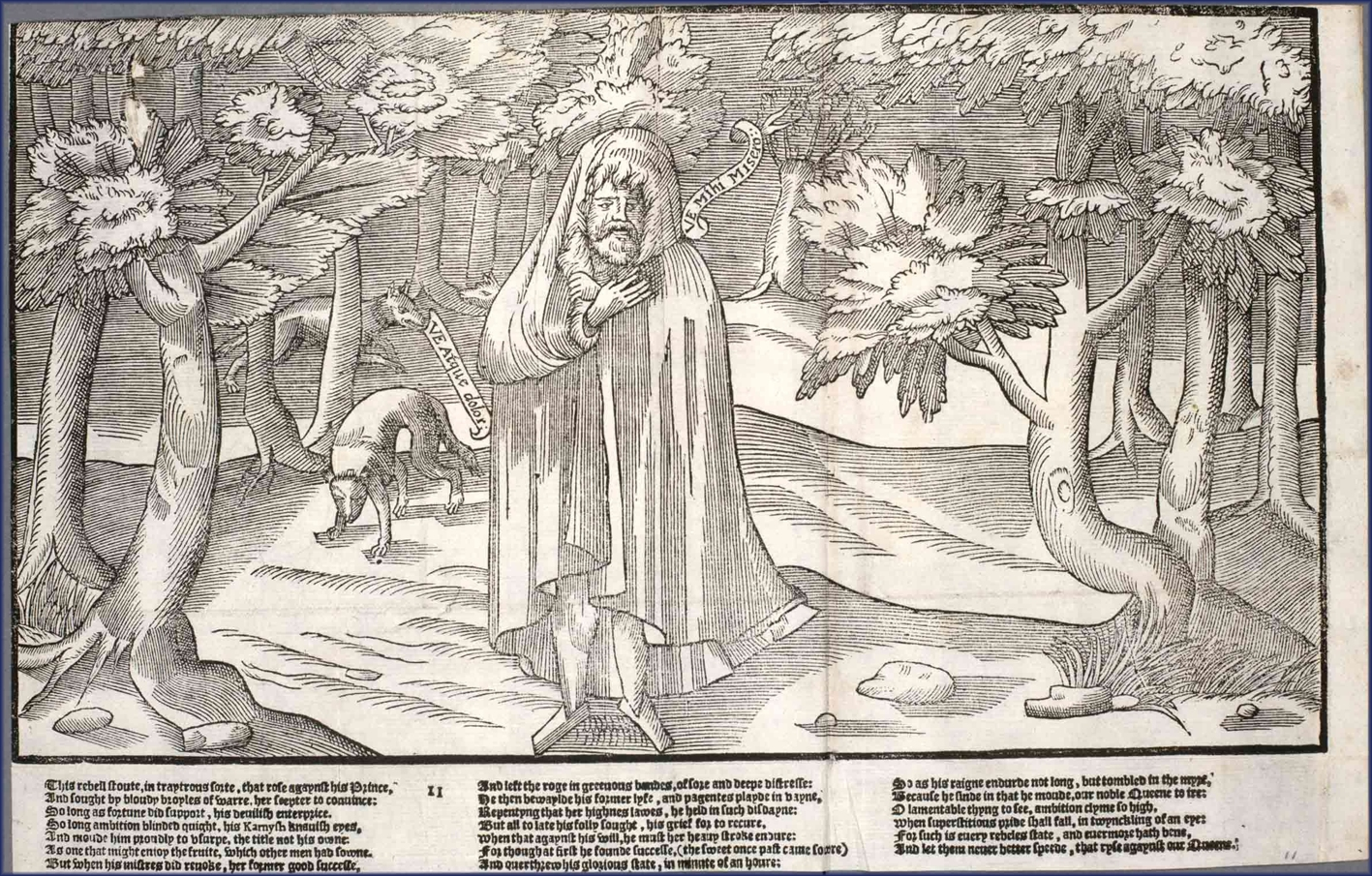
Plate 11. Ruaidhrí Óg Ó Mórdha wearing the traditional Irish mantle in the forest, with his hunting dog.

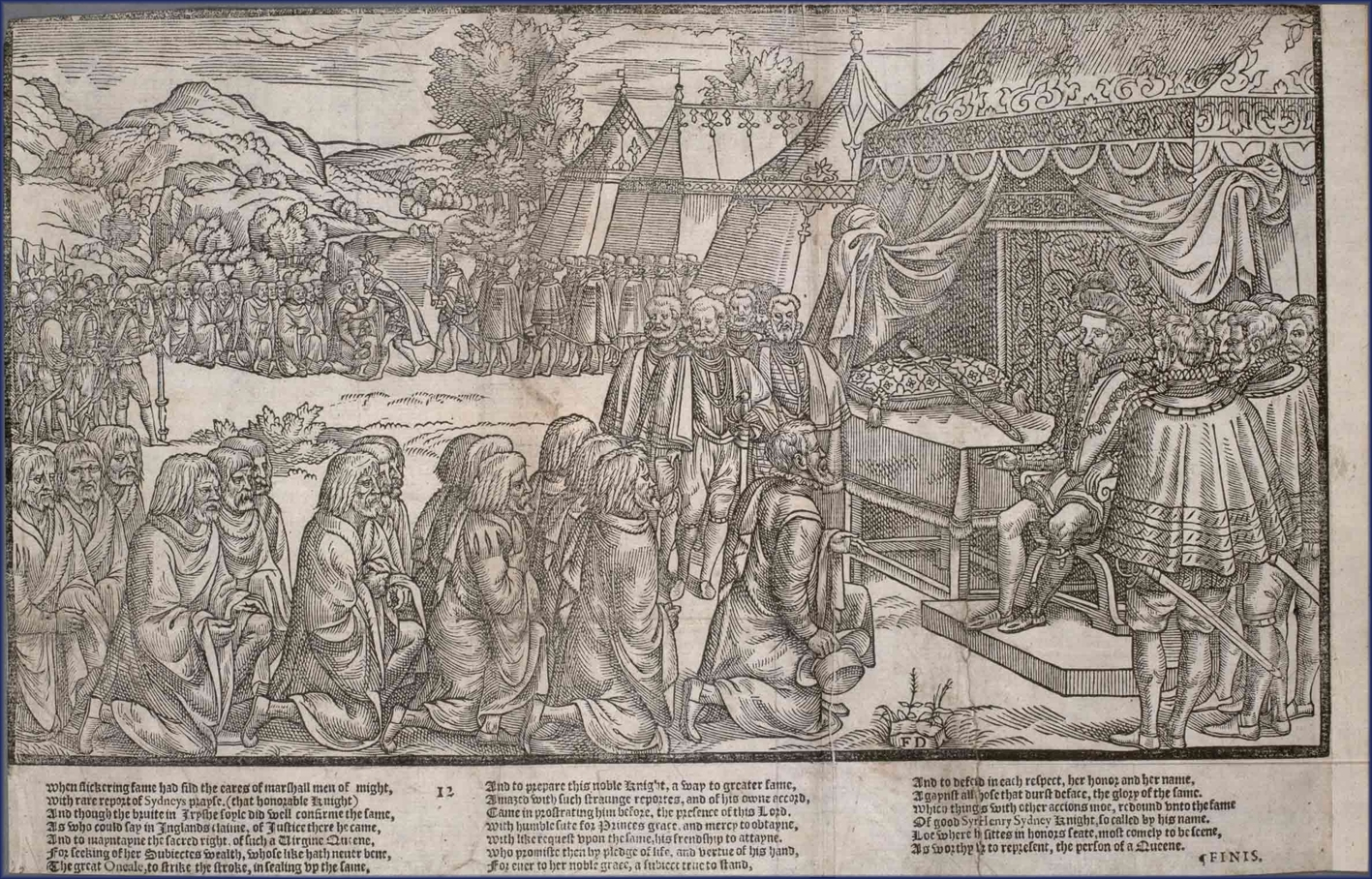
Plate 12. Turlough Lynagh O'Neil and another kneel to Sidney in submission. In the background Sidney seems to be embracing O'Neill as a noble friend.
