= Clogh, County Antrim =

Village in County Antrim, Northern Ireland

Coordinates: 54°58′N 6°17′W

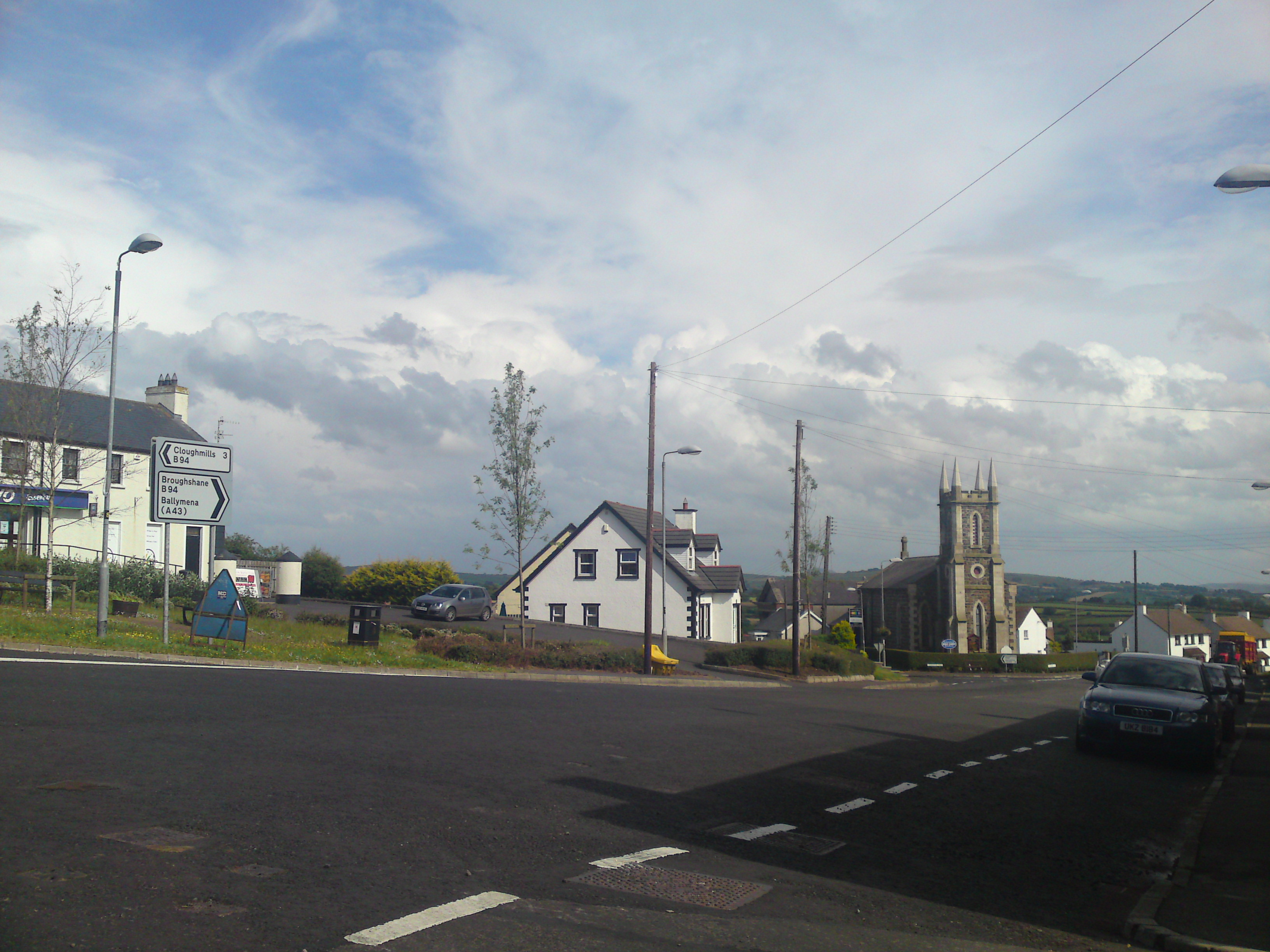
Cloughwater Road, Clough's main street, is home to St James Church of Ireland church (right)

Clogh, also spelt as Clough (from Irish An Chloch 'the stone'), is a small village in County Antrim, Northern Ireland, 9 miles from Ballymena. It is situated within the Glenravel ward of the Braid electoral area of Mid and East Antrim District Council. It had a population of 220 people (90 households) in the 2011 census, up from 105 people in 2001.

== Religion ==
Dunaghy Old Rectory is located on the village's main street. There are three churches in the vicinity, including St. James Dunaghy Parish Church of Ireland church at the fork junction at the bottom of the main street, a Gospel Hall also on the main street, and a large Presbyterian Church just outside the village. The village's community centre is housed in a building that was originally Clough Baptist Church at the top of the main street. This church closed in the early 1990s, and the building was reopened as a community centre in 2005.

== Sport ==
Clough Rangers Athletic, a junior-level association football club, has its home ground at Cloughwater Road outside the village. As of 2019, the club was fielding teams in the Ballymena Saturday Morning League.

== See also ==
- List of towns and villages in Northern Ireland
- List of places in County Antrim
