= John Derricke =

Irish author and artist

John Derricke (fl. 1578–1581) was the author and artist of The Image of Irelande, with a Discoverie of Woodkarne, a 1581 book describing the Irish campaigns of Lord Deputy Henry Sidney.

The book's dedication to Sir Philip Sidney was signed at Dublin on 16 June 1578, indicating that Derricke completed the book in Ireland and was likely an eyewitness to the events therein. Katherine Duncan-Jones connects Derricke's dedication to an assumption that Sir Philip would succeed Sir Henry, his father, as Lord Deputy. He probably returned to England with Sidney in 1578, after which his illustrations would have been engraved and his book published in London by John Day in 1581.

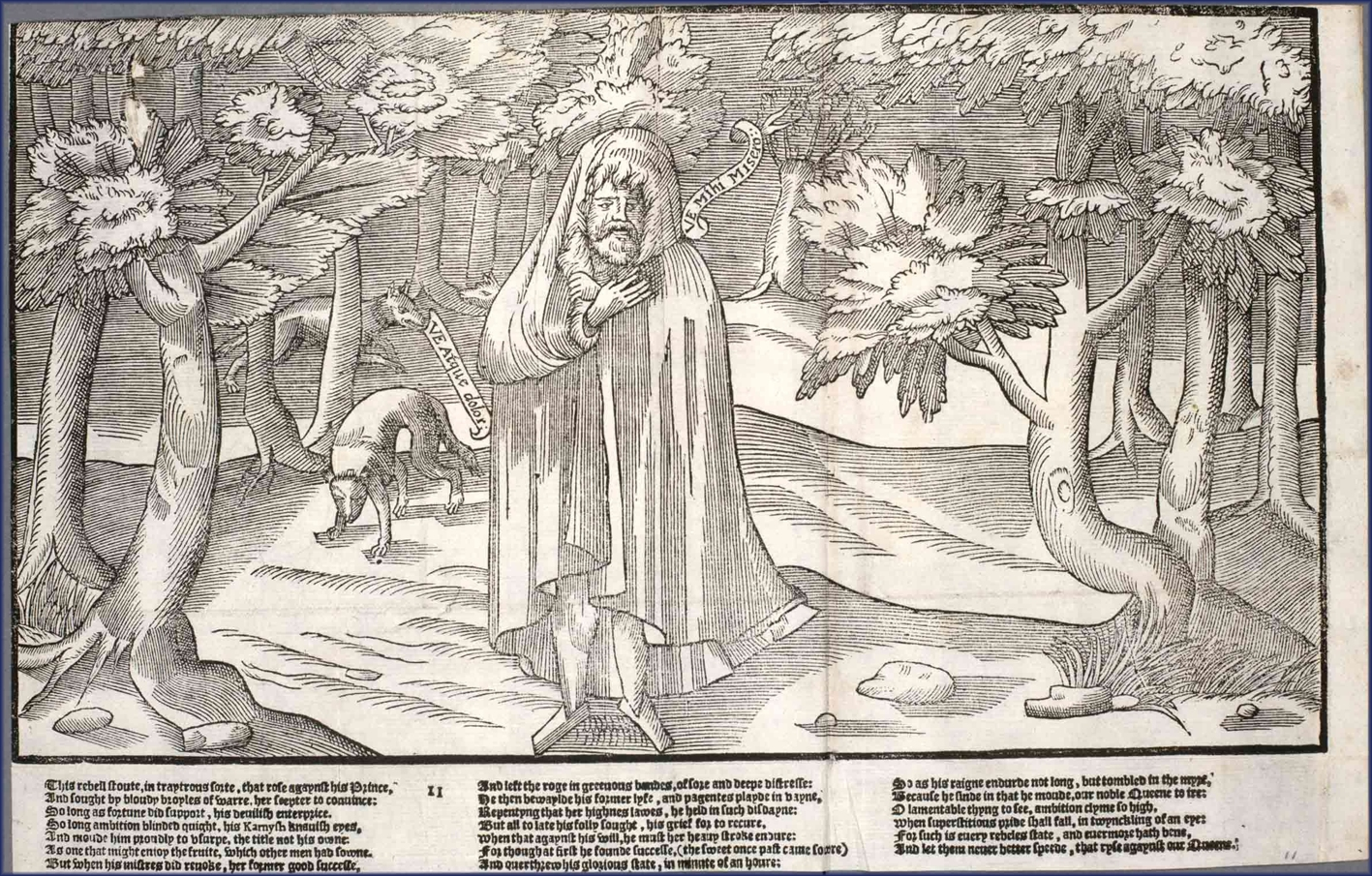
Plate from The Image of Irelande

He was in all likelihood also the John Derick who was appointed to collect custom duty on wine imported into Drogheda port in 1569.
