= Mullaghmast =

Hill and prehistoric site in Ireland

Mullamast
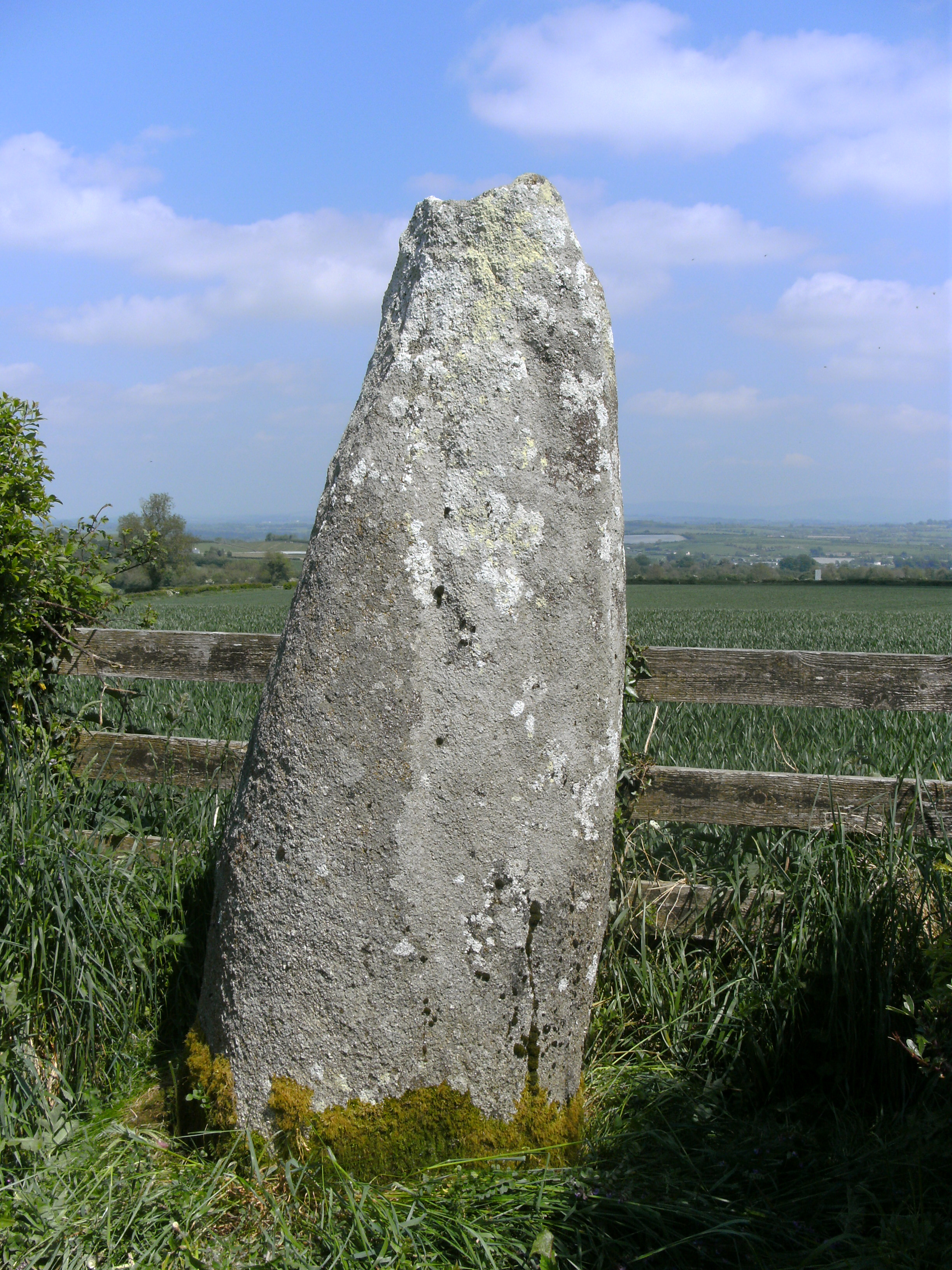
- Standing stone on Mullaghmast

Highest point
- Elevation: 179 m (587 ft)
- Coordinates: 53°00′36″N 6°51′08″W

Naming
- Native name: Mullach Maistín
- English translation: Broad crown (summit) of Maistiu

Geography
- Location within island of Ireland
- Location: County Kildare, Ireland
- OSI/OSNI grid: S770961

Mullaghmast (Irish: Mullach Maistín; modern English spelling: Mullamast) is a hill in the south of County Kildare, Ireland, near the village of Ballitore and near the borders with counties Wicklow, Laois and Carlow. It was an important site in prehistory, in early history and again in more recent times. It is classed as a National Monument by the Department of the Environment, Community and Local Government.

== Legend and prehistory ==
The Metrical Dindshenchas, or Lore of Places, a Middle Irish collection of poetry purporting to explain the origins of Irish place names, claims that Mullaghmast is named for Maistiu, wife of Dáire Derg, who was killed by the sorcery of the malicious fairy Gris, who was in turned killed by Dáire Derg.

A standing stone from Mullaghmast, decorated with a triskele, thought to belong to the very end of the prehistoric period, or perhaps to the early Christian period, is now in the National Museum of Ireland in Dublin.

Mullaghmast was the royal residence of the Uí Muiredaig kings (later to become the O'Toole family), a sept of the Uí Dúnlainge dynasty of the Laigin.

== 1578 Massacre of Mullaghmast ==
A rebellion had been launched by Rory O'More whose forces burnt Naas in 1577. The 40 lords of Laois and Offaly and their families were invited to a peace conference by Sir Henry Sidney on or around New Year's Day 1578; Sidney rose and left the unarmed lords and their wives, children and followers, and all except one were killed by Sidney's men, leaving the castle strewn with body parts and drenched in blood. This killing reputedly of 400 people including 120 O'Mores, virtually the whole O'More family, emptied the country of authority, continuing the English plantations in Queen's County and King's County.

From the Annals of the Four Masters:

- M1577.14. A horrible and abominable act of treachery was committed by the English of Leinster and Meath upon that part of the people of Offaly and Leix that remained in confederacy with them, and under their protection. It was effected thus: they were all summoned to shew themselves, with the greatest number they could be able to bring with them, at the great ráth of Mullach-Maistean; and on their arrival at that place they were surrounded on every side by four lines of soldiers and cavalry, who proceeded to shoot and slaughter them without mercy, so that not a single individual escaped, by flight or force.
- M1577.14. Feall urghranna adhuathmhar do dhénamh lá Gallaibh Laighean & Midhe ar an meid baoí ina rann fein, & ro an for a n-ionchaibh do Uíbh Failghe & do Laoighis. Bá h-amhlaidh do-rónadh ind sin. Ro toghairmeadh iad uile dia t-taisbénadh gusan líon as lia nó caomhsadaoís do thabairt leó go ráith mhóir Mhullaigh Mhaistean & iar rochtain dóibh gusan maighin-sin, ro h-iadadh ceithri sretha ina n-uirtimceall ima c-cuairt do shaighdiúiridhibh & do mharc-shluagh, & ro gabhadh occ á n-diubhraccadh gan dhicheall, occa mudhucchadh & occ á mór mharbhadh coná térna sceolanga, ná elaitheach ass a m-bethaidh díobh.
