= William mac an Iarla Burke =

Irish noble (ex. 1580)

The Honourable William mac an Iarla Burke
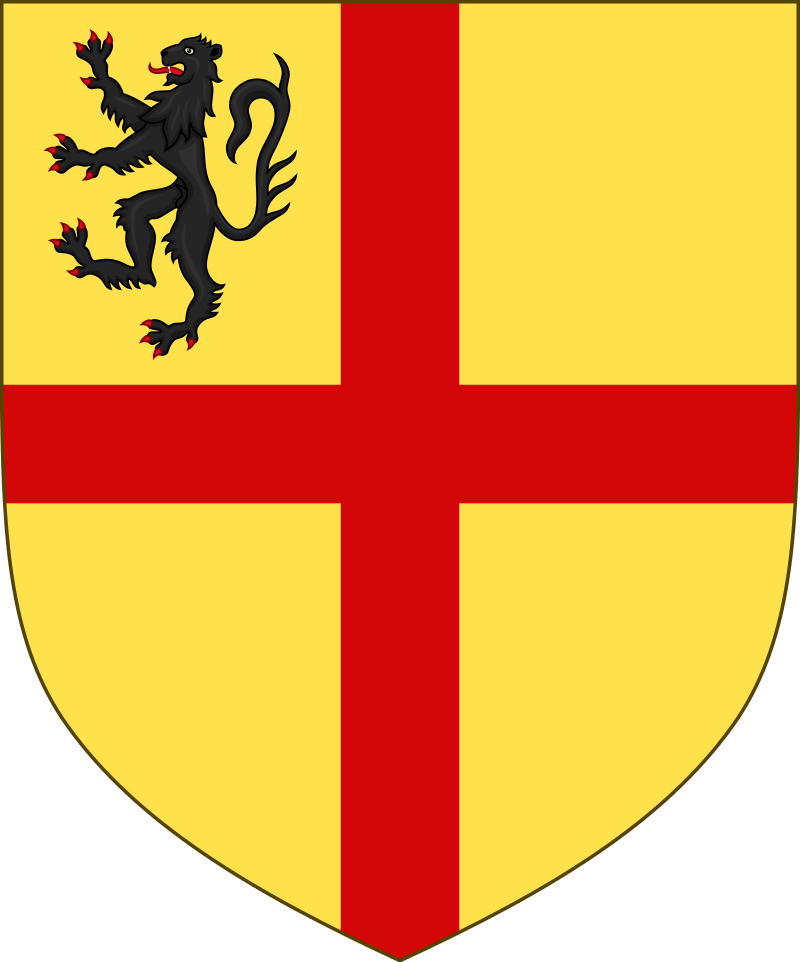
- Arms of de Burgh/Burke of Clanricarde: Or, a cross gules in the first quarter a lion rampant sable
- Died: 1580
- Parent: Richard Burke, 2nd Earl of Clanricarde
- Relatives: Ulick Burke, 3rd Earl of Clanricarde (brother); John na Seamar Burke, Baron Leitrim (brother)

William mac an Iarla Burke (died 1580) was an Irish lord who was executed in 1580.

== Annals of the Four Masters ==
Under the year 1581, the Annals of the Four Masters relate the story of Burke:

The son of the Earl of Clanrickard, i.e. William Burke, son of Rickard Saxonagh, son of Ulick-na-gCeann, son of Rickard, son of Ulick of Cnoc-Tuagh, was hanged at Galway, the third day after the execution of Turlough O'Brien; that is, Turlough was hanged on Thursday, and William on Saturday. It happened that William was joined with his relatives in the war when they demolished their castles, as we have already mentioned; that he grew sorry for this, and went to Galway, under the protection of the English, the month before his execution; but some tale was fabricated against him, for which he was taken and hanged. Such of his followers as went in under this protection were also hanged.

== Execution ==
Burke was hanged by William Óge Martyn (died 1592) who, aware that the Mayor of Galway, Dominick Lynch, had a pardon for Burke, prevented the Mayor from arriving in time to stop the execution of Burke and his men.

== Family ==
Burke's elder brother, Ulick Burke, one of the two chief leaders of the Mac an Iarla wars, became Earl of Clanricarde in 1582.

== See also ==
- House of Burgh, an Anglo-Norman and Hiberno-Norman dynasty founded in 1193
- Earl of Clanricarde
