= Sack of Athenry =

16th century historical episode in Ireland

The sack of Athenry was a 1572 battle in Ireland. For much of its history the town of Athenry (/æθənˈraɪ/ ath-ən-REYE) was safe behind its walls, erected in the aftermath of the Second Battle of Athenry in 1316 during the height of the Bruce Wars. However, the beginning of the end occurred during the Mac an Iarla Wars in 1572, when, according to the Annals of the Four Masters:

"They destroyed the walls of the town of Athenry, and also its stone houses and its castle; and they so damaged the town that it was not easy to repair it for a long time after them."

This was the first of a number of attacks committed by the Mac an Iarlas, and later, by Red Hugh O'Donnell. By the end of the 16th century Athenry, once the premier town in Connacht, was reduced to a shell, and did not begin to truly recover till the late 1990s.

== See also ==
- History of Ireland
- 1577 in Ireland
- 1572 in Ireland
