= Massacre of Mullaghmast =

1577 or 1578 mass killing of Irish Gaelic nobles

- Part of the Tudor conquest of Ireland
- Massacre of Mullaghmast (Ireland)
- Location: 53.0099°N 6.8522°W; Mullaghmast, Ballitore, County Kildare
- Date: Late 1577 or 1 January 1578
- Attack type: Massacre
- Deaths: 100-400
- Perpetrators: Henry Sidney and Kingdom of Ireland militia

The massacre of Mullaghmast (Irish: ár Mhullach maistean) was the mass killing of between 100 and 400 members of the Gaelic nobility of Ireland by English forces under the command of Sir Henry Sidney in Mullaghmast, County Kildare in either late 1577 or 1 January 1578. There is limited surviving documentation on the massacre, although documents have recently been made available at the National Library of Ireland.

== Background ==
According to traditional accounts, Francis Cosby and Robert Hartpole – prospective English colonists in the plantation of the Queen's County (the ancient kingdom of Loígis, modern County Laois) and the King's County (the ancient kingdom of Uí Failghe, modern County Offaly) – plotted to kill native Irish chieftains. The Lord Deputy of Ireland, Henry Sidney, reputedly colluded with Cosby and Hartpole. To expedite the plot, they befriended members of prominent native Irish families (including two powerful chieftains from Ulster).

Between 100 and 400 members of families prominent in Loígis and Uí Failghe were summoned to Mullaghmast in County Kildare, under the pretext of performing military service. Most of those who attended were murdered, including some who were burned at the stake.

The following account of the massacre is found in the Annals of the Four Masters:

1577. A horrible and abominable act of treachery was committed by the English of Leinster and Meath upon that part of the people of Offaly and Leix that remained in confederacy with them, and under their protection. It was effected thus: they were all summoned to shew themselves, with the greatest number they could be able to bring with them, at the great ráth of Mullach-Maistean; and on their arrival at that place they were surrounded on every side by four lines of soldiers and cavalry, who proceeded to shoot and slaughter them without mercy, so that not a single individual escaped, by flight or force.

John O'Donovan, in his edition of the Annals, stated:

In the year 1705, there was an old gentleman of the name of Cullen, in the County Kildare, who often discoursed with one Dwyer and one Dowling, actually living at Mullaghmast when this horrid murder was committed, which was about the sixteenth year [recté, nineteenth] of Queen Elizabeth's reign; and the account he gives of it is, that those who were chiefly concerned in this horrid murder were the Deavils, the Grehams, the Cosbys, the Piggotts, the Bowens, the Hartpoles, the Hovendons, the Dempsys, and the FitzGeralds. The last five of these were, at that time, Roman Catholics, by whom the poor people murdered at Mullaghmast were chiefly invited there, in pretence that said people should enter into an alliance offensive and defensive with them. But their reception was to put them all to death, except one O'More, who was the only person that escaped. Notwithstanding what is said that one O'More only had escaped the massacre, yet the common tradition of the country is, that many more had escaped through the means of one Henry Lalor, who, remarking that none of those returned who had entered the fort before him, desired his companions to make off as fast as they could, in case they did not see him come back. Said Lalor, as he was entering the fort, saw the carcasses of his slaughtered companions; then drew his sword, and fought his way back to those that survived, along with whom he made his escape to Dysart, his family's ancestral home.

== See also ==
- List of massacres in Ireland
- Dempsey
