= 1569 in Ireland =

- Centuries: 14th; 15th; 16th; 17th; 18th
- Decades: 1540s; 1550s; 1560s; 1570s; 1580s
- See also: Other events of 1569; List of years in Ireland

Events from the year 1569 in Ireland.

== Incumbent ==
- Monarch: Elizabeth I

== Events ==
- Sir Edmund Butler of Cloughgrenan leads a revolt against the Lord Deputy of Ireland, Sir Henry Sidney, in Leinster.

== Births ==
- Niall Garve O'Donnell (Niall Garbh Ó Domhnaill), last Prince of Tyrconnell (d. 1626)
- Geoffrey Keating (Seathrún Céitinn), Roman Catholic priest, poet and historian (d. c.1644)
