= Donnchad Clereach Ó Maol Braonáin =

Irish medieval cleric and musician

- Died: 1343
- Occupations: Cleric; musician
- Known for: canon chorister at Elphin; mentioned in the Annals of Lough Ce

Donnchad Clereach Ó Maol Braonáin, Irish cleric and musician, died 1343.

The Annals of Lough Ce, sub anno 1343, note the manner of Ó Maol Braonáin's death:

Donnchadh Clerech O'Maelbhrenainn, a canon chorister at Oilfinn (Elphin), was killed with a shot of an arrow by the people of Hubert, son of David Donn Mac William (Burke).

His surname is generally now rendered as Brennan.
