= Edmund O'Donnell =

Jesuit executed by English government

Edmund O'Donnell was the first Jesuit executed by the English government.

He was born at Limerick in 1542, executed at Cork, 16 March 1575. His family had held the highest civic offices in Limerick since the thirteenth century, and he was closely related to David Wolfe, Pope Pius IV's legate in Ireland. He entered the Society of Jesus at Rome, 11 September 1561, but, developing symptoms of Phthisis, was removed to Flanders. In 1564 he returned to Limerick and taught, with a secular priest and a layman, in the school which Wolfe established with connivance of the civic authorities. The school was dispersed in October, 1565, by soldiers sent by Sir Thomas Cusack, and, for a short time, they taught at Kilmallock. In a few months they returned to Limerick, and were not molested again until 1568, when Hugh Brady, Protestant Bishop of Meath, visited the city as royal commissioner and made diligent search for them. O'Donnell was ordered to quit the country under pain of death and withdrew to Lisbon, where he was again a student in 1572. Venturing back to Limerick in 1574 he was apprehended soon after landing, and thrown into prison. Rejecting all inducements to embrace Protestantism he was removed to Cork, tried for returning after banishment, denying the royal supremacy, and carrying letters for James Fitzmaurice. He was found guilty, and sentenced to be hanged, drawn and quartered.

He has been called McDonnell, MacDonald, Donnelly, and MacDonough and Donagh. Edmund Hogan, historiographer of the Irish Jesuit province, found him recorded as Edmundus Daniell in the Society's archives, and so the name usually appears in Limerick records, though as Dannel and O'Dannel. John Copinger and Anthony Bruodin give the name as O'Donell (O'Donellus). The archives and a contemporary letter from Fitzmaurice confirm Bruodin's positive assertion that he suffered in 1575, not in 1580 as generally stated.
