= Richard Burke, 2nd Earl of Clanricarde =

Irish peer (died 1582)

The Earl of Clanricarde
- Ricard de Búrca

Member of the Irish House of Lords
- Hereditary Peerage; March 1544 – 24 July 1582
- Preceded by: Ulick na gCeann Burke
- Succeeded by: Ulick Burke

Personal details
- Born: Richard Burke
- Died: 24 July 1582
- Spouses: Margaret O'Brien (m. 1548, divorced); Margaret O'Brien (m. 1553); Julia MacCarthy (m. 1568)
- Domestic partner: Honora O'Brien
- Children: Ulick Burke, 3rd Earl of Clanricarde; Mary Burke; John na Seamar Burke, Baron Leitrim; Mary de Burgh; William mac an Iarla Burke; Margaret de Burgh; Richard 'Og' Bourke
- Parents: Ulick na gCeann Burke, 1st Earl of Clanricarde; Grace O'Carroll

Richard Sassanach Burke, 2nd Earl of Clanricarde (English: /klænˈrɪkɑːrd/ klan-RIK-ard; died 24 July 1582), styled Lord Dunkellin (/dʌnˈkɛlɪn/ dun-KEL-in) until 1544, was an Irish noble who succeeded his father Ulick na gCeann Burke, 1st Earl of Clanricarde as chief of a Gaelicised Norman family with authority over much of what is now County Galway. Richard's nickname was Sassanach "Englishman", because he took the English part during the Tudor reconquest of Ireland.

Richard's mother, Grace O'Carroll, was one of several putative wives of Ulick na gCeann, such that there were rival candidates to succeed to the Earldom. Richard, the oldest legitimate son in English law, was the eventual successor. He was sporadically opposed by his brothers and half-brothers, including John, whose mother was of Maire Lynch, and who claimed the title in 1568.

Richard extended his influence at the expense of the Ó Ceallaigh and the O'Maddens in the east of County Galway, gaining overlordship over the O'Shaughnessy in the south, while allying himself with the O'Conor Don and the O'Briens of Thomond. Other minor allies included the MacCostelloe and MacMorris, who acknowledged him to avoid encroachment from the Bourkes of Mayo. In 1559 Clanricarde fought on the losing side at the Battle of Spancel Hill during an O'Brien succession dispute.

== Mac an Iarla War ==
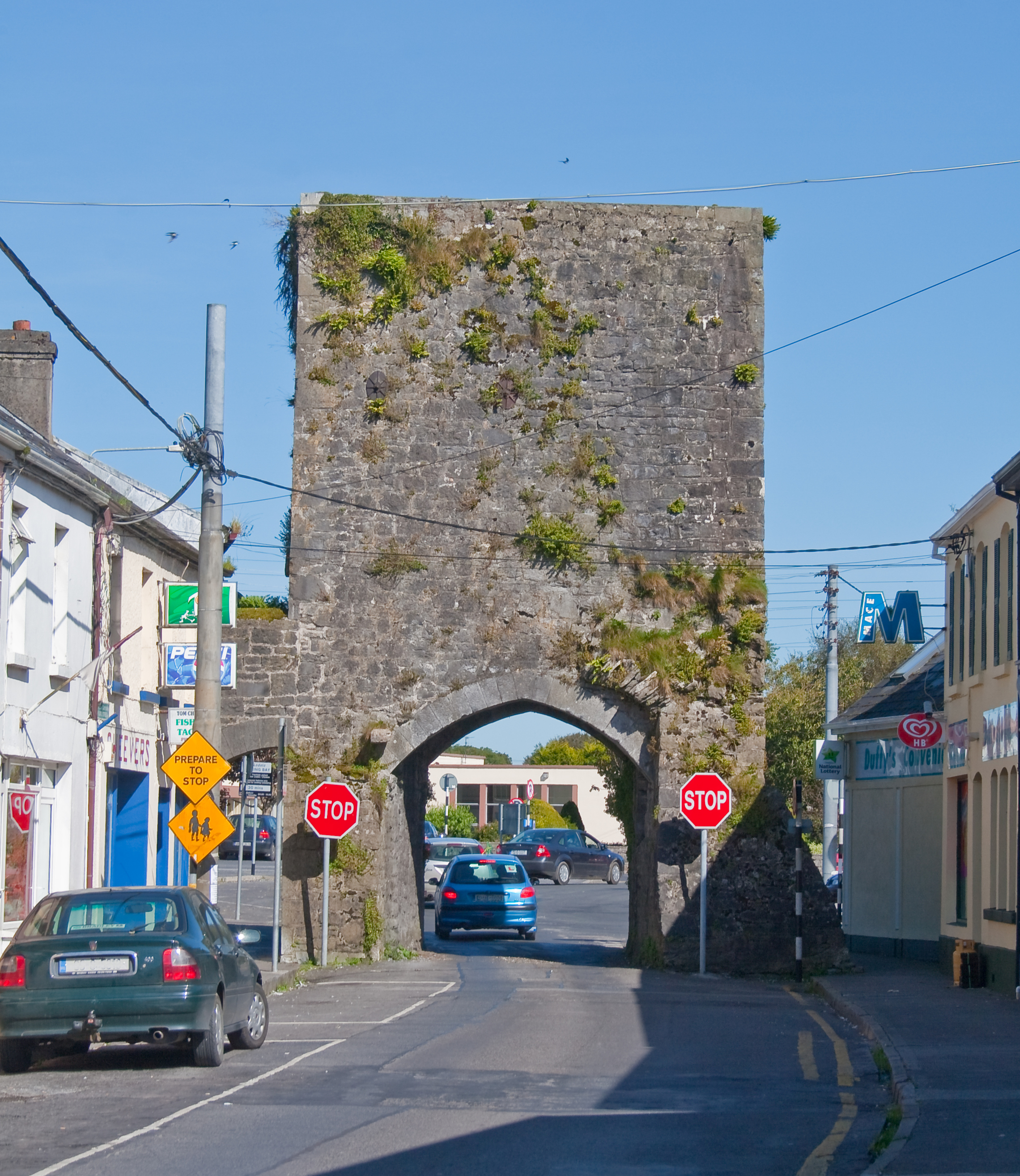
The North Gate, Athenry.

From around 1570 his sons (Mac an Iarla "son of the earl") rebelled against him and the Anglo-Irish government. That decade witnessed regular warfare across the county which devastated towns such as Galway, Athenry and Loughrea. Major engagements included:

- 1572 – First Sack of Athenry
- 1573 – Beal an Chip
- 1577 – Second Sack of Athenry
- 1577 – Siege of Loughrea
- 1579 – Lisdalon
- 1580 – Sack of Loughrea
- 1580 – Cill Tuathail

At the time of his death Burke had endured imprisonment in Dublin, and repeated treachery by his sons. After his death, further warfare was avoided when Ulick killed his brother John and was acknowledged as the 3rd Earl of Clanricarde.

== Family ==
Richard married three times and had several children (possibly five sons and three daughters): Firstly, he married Margaret O'Brien, daughter of Murrough O'Brien, 1st Earl of Thomond and Eleanor FitzGerald, before 6 October 1548. They were divorced after he claimed that she worked witchcraft against him. Their children were:

- Ulick Burke, later 3rd Earl of Clanricarde (died 1602)
- Mary Burke (c.1560 – c.1627)

Secondly, he married Margaret O'Brien, daughter of Donough O'Brien, 2nd Earl of Thomond and Helen Butler, on 24 November 1553. Their children were:

- John of the Shamrocks (murdered 1583)
- Unknown son
- Unknown son
- Unknown daughter
- Mary de Burgh

Thirdly, he married Julia MacCarthy, daughter of Cormac 'Oge' MacCarthy, in 1568. Their son was:

- William mac an Iarla Burke (executed 1580)

Richard had liaisons with several other women including Honora O'Brien, daughter of Turlogh O'Brien, with whom he had children:

- Margaret de Burgh who married (1) Richard Burke; and (2) Theobald Bourke, 1st Lord Bourke, Baron of Brittas (d.1654)
- Richard 'Og' Bourke

He also had liaisons with Sawny 'Oge' Burke and Julia Brown.

== Annals of the Four Masters ==
From the Annals of the Four Masters:

M1558.5. The Earl of Clanrickard gave a great defeat to the Scots. This Earl was Rickard, son of Ulick-na-gCeann, son of Rickard, son of Ulick of Cnoc-tuagh, son of Ulick Meodhanach, son of Ulick of the Wine; and the Scots who sustained that defeat were Donnell, the son of Dowell, son of Gillespick Mac Allen Campbell, and Dowell, the son of Donough, son of Gillespick Mac Allen, two brave young constables of gallowglasses, who had been a long time before hired into the service of the Ultonians, but more particularly in the service of Tirconnell. They had agreed among themselves, stimulated by extraordinary vigour and bravery, to leave those districts, and to proceed through Connaught, to render their names famous. They first passed through the territory of Carbry, the son of Niall, through the lower part of Tirerrill, by the territory of Gaileang (where Cormac Gaileang, the son of Teige, son of Kian, son of Oilioll Olum, settled after having violated the guarantee of his father), and into the country of Awley of Fiachra Tirawley. In this last mentioned territory Mac William (Richard-an-iarrainn, the son of David, son of Edmond, son of Ulick) came to meet them; and he promised to support them for plundering his neighbours and harassing his enemies. When the Earl of Clanrickard heard that this foreign host had arrived in his neighbourhood, he collected the greatest number that he was able of mail-clad warriors and ordnance, and did not halt till he arrived at the place where those Scots were, by the Moy. He was the better of attacking them there, for he routed this foreign band of fiercely rapacious warriors, who did not consider their distance from their native country and their kindred, for they suffered their enemies to slaughter them on the spot. Donnell and Dowell were slain there; but the victory would have been greater if they had been taken prisoners, instead of being slain, for an equivalent ransom in any kind of riches would have been received for them. The power of the Scots was enfeebled in Connaught for a considerable time after this attack.

M1568.1. The Countess of Clanrickard, i.e. Margaret, daughter of Donough, son of Conor, son of Turlough, the most famous woman in Ireland, and the supporter of her friends and relations, died.

== Arms ==
Coat of arms of Richard Burke, 2nd Earl of Clanricarde
Crest A Cat-a-Mountain sejant guardant proper, collared and chained Or. Escutcheon Or, a cross gules in the first quarter a lion rampant sable. Supporters Two Cats-a-Mountain sejant guardant proper, collared and chained Or. Motto UNG ROY, UNG FOY, UNG LOY (One king, one faith, one law)

== Ancestry ==
Ancestors of Richard Burke, 2nd Earl of Clanricarde

8. Ulick Fionn Burke, 6th Clanricarde
4. Richard Mór Burke, 9th Clanricarde
9.
2. Ulick na gCeann Burke, 1st Earl of Clanricarde
10.
5. Margaret Butler
11.
1. Richard Burke, 2nd Earl of Clanricarde
12.
6. Mulrone O'Carroll
13.
3. Grany or Grace O'Carroll
14.
7.
15.

== See also ==
- House of Burgh, an Anglo-Norman and Hiberno-Norman dynasty founded in 1193

Peerage of Ireland
Preceded by Ulick na gCeann Burke	Earl of Clanricarde; 1544–1582	Succeeded by Ulick Burke
