= Diarmuid Mac Bruideadha =

Irish poet

Diarmuid Mac Bruideadha (Brody), Irish poet, died 1563.

Diarmuid was a Mac Bruideadha brehon family member, based at Ballybrody, parish of Dysert, barony of Inchiquin, County Clare. Other branches were located at Knockanalban in Ibrickane and Lettermoylan in Inchiquin.

The Annals of the Four Masters describe Diarmuid, sub anno 1563, as follows:

- Mac Brody, Ollav of Hy-Bracain and Hy-Fearmaic, died, i.e. Dermot, son of Conor, son of Dermot, son of John; and his brother, Maoilin, took his place.

== Family tree ==
  John Mac Bruideadha
  |
  |
  Diarmuid
  |
  |
  Concubhair
  |
  |___________________________
  |                          |
  |                          |
  Diarmuid, d. 1563.   Maoilin, d. 1582.
                             | 
                             |
                             Maoilin Óg, d. 1602
                             |
                             |
                             Concubhair, fl. 1636.

== See also ==
- Seán Buí Mac Bruideadha, fl. 14th century.
- Tadhg mac Dáire Mac Bruaideadha, c.1570-1652.
