= Loígis =

Medieval Irish kingdom

Loígis (Middle Irish pronunciation: [ˈl̪oːi̯ɣʲisʲ]) is the name of an Irish tribe, as it is called by contemporary scholars. Formerly, scholars generally called the tribe Laoighis or Laeighis in Irish, Lagisia in Latin, and Leix in English. Loígis is also the name of the territory in western Leinster that the tribe settled during the third century AD, and of the minor kingdom that the Loígis chieftains ruled until 1608. County Laois derives its name from Loígis, although the present county encompasses baronies that were not traditionally part of the territory of Loígis.

== Background ==
The name Loígis stems from the name of the tribe's first chieftain, Laigse(a)ch, Laeighsech, or Loígsech. Historical texts render that chieftain's full name variously as Lugaid Laigsech; Lugaid Loígsech Cennmár; Lugaid Laigseach, and Laigsech Ceandmar. One nineteenth-century analysis says that Laeighsech Cenn-mor and Lugaidh Laeighsech were actually two distinct individuals, the former being the father of the latter. Laeighsech Cenn-mor, who was a son of the famed Conall Cernach, would according to that account be the father of the tribe's eponymous ancestor, Lugaidh Laeighsech. A twelfth or thirteenth century gloss on the tribe's name says that Loígsech comes from lóeg secha. The word lóeg, literally 'calf or fawn', has the figurative meaning of 'favorite or darling', while secha means 'more than; above or beyond'.

Before migrating to Leinster, the Loígis belonged to the northeastern Irish Dál nAraidi, a confederation of tribes that claimed descent from the eponymous ancestor Fiachu Araide (Fachtna Araide). The Dál nAraidi were part of the Cruthin, a people whose name is considered to be related etymologically to that of the Picts, although current scholarship questions whether there was any cultural or linguistic relationship between the Irish Cruthin and Scottish Picts.

The Loígis tribe received their territory from the king of Leinster in reward for contributing troops to expel a Munster occupation of western Leinster. A record of that campaign appears in Keating's early-seventeenth-century Foras Feasa ar Éirinn (The History of Ireland). Another early seventeenth-century account of the campaign is contained in McGeoghegan's translation of The Annals of Clonmacnoise. The campaign has provisionally been dated to the third century AD. Although the Loígis were originally from Ulster in the north, Lugaidh Laeighsech led his tribe into the southern conflict at the request of his foster father, Eochaid Find Fuath nAirt ('Eochaid the Fair, Art's Abhorrence'). Initially, the king of Leinster, Cu Corb, had sought military aid from Eochaid, whose nephew, Art mac Cuinn, the High King of Ireland, had shortly before exiled Eochaid. According to one source, the High King banished his uncle for sneaking a human head into Tara to desecrate a royal feast. Another account says that Art exiled Eochaid for killing Art's brothers, Connla and Crionna, leaving their only surviving brother with the name Art Óenfer ('Art, the Solitary'). Regardless of why he left Meath, Eochaid brought his forster son (dalta) Lugaidh Laeighsech into the alliance with Leinster's king, who consequently granted the Loígis tribe the territory in western Leinster that the allies recaptured from Munster. For his own part in that campaign Eochaid similarly won for the Fothart tribe, which was named after him, territories in what are now Counties Kildare, Wicklow, and Carlow.

As compensation for expelling the Munster men from Leinster, the Loígis tribe received not only the territory that came to bear their name, but also certain hereditary rights that the king of Leinster bestowed on the tribe's chieftains, who were from that point recognized as kings of Loígis (ríg Laíchsi/ rí Laí[gh]si) in their own right. Many of the Loígis king's rights acknowledged that there were seven Loígis of Leinster (secht Loíchsi Lagen). Those seven were what early seventeenth-century English records would later call the seven septs of Leix. The king of Leinster covenanted, for example, to retain in his employ seven of the followers of the king of Loígis, while the latter agreed to provide seven oxen and to maintain seven score of warriors to fight for the king of Leinster. English etymologists since the eighteenth century have held that the word sept, which specifically applies to the Irish clan structure, is derived from the Latin septum, meaning literally 'a hedge or fence' and figuratively 'a division'. One nineteenth-century scholar of Irish history, however, suggested that sept might alternatively have derived from the Latin septem, 'seven', and argued that the number seven had particular relevance to peoples of Cruthin or Pictish origin, like the Loígis, who invariably divided their tribes into seven parts. The Loígis maintained such a seven-part division until English authorities transplanted the tribe to Kerry in 1608.

The Loígis had already been identified with the number seven in a poem attributed to Mael Mura of Othain (fl. ninth century), which was perhaps the earliest texts that mentioned the tribe. Nevertheless, no text explicitly named the seven septs before 1607, when they were identified as the "Moores and their followers, the Kellies, Lalors, Clanmelaughlins, Clandebojes, Dorans, and Dolins". That appeared in a report to the Privy Council, where Arthur Chichester (1563–1625), the Lord Deputy of Ireland, said that chronic rebellions throughout the island had been inspired primarily by the seven septs of Queen's County. Among the seven, the Moore sept claimed an uninterrupted succession to the chieftainship of Loígis since the reign of Lugaidh Laeighsech, although they only assumed the surname Moore around the eleventh century. The Annals of the Four Masters record in 1018 the killing of Cernach Ua Mórdha, meaning Cernach, grandson of Mordha, from which derives the surname O'More, or Moore. The pedigree of the kings of Loígis (Genelach Rig Laigsi) in the Book of Leinster says that Cernach was the son of Ceinneidigh, who was the son of Morda ["Cernaig m Ceinneidig m Morda"].

It was not until the 19th century that all of the seven Loígis septs were definitively identified with a fixed group of surnames, which were the "O'Mores, O'Kellys, O'Lalors, O'Devoys or O'Deevys, Macavoys, O'Dorans, and O'Dowlings". With the exception of the O'Devoys or O'Deevys and the Macavoys, Chichester's 1607 report named the other five septs. In a 1608 agreement with the English, the sept leaders relinquished their hereditary landholdings in Queen's County in exchange for new grants in County Kerry. Only six groupings of families signed that agreement, namely the "Moores, the Kellies, the Lalours, the Dorans, the Clandeboys, and the Dowlins". Clandeboys and Clandebojes, was a variant form of the Macavoy/McEvoy sept name. The agreement does not mention any representatives of the O'Devoy/Deevy sept.

== See also ==
- Kingdom of Ossory
- Kingdom of Uí Failghe
- Laigin
- Thomond
- Pre-Norman invasion Irish Celtic kinship groups, from whom many of the modern Irish surnames came from
