= Edmund Tanner =

Irish Roman Catholic bishop

Edmund Tanner (c.1526 – 1579) was an Irish Jesuit, Roman Catholic Bishop of Cork and Cloyne, Ireland, from 1574 to 1579.

== Life ==
Tanner's early life is unknown; he left Ireland by 1559, and reached Italy via Spain. In 1565 he was a Catholic priest in Rome, and entered the Society of Jesus. After a year at the Roman College he was sent to Dillingen University in 1567, and became doctor of divinity. His health, however, failed and he left the Society. In 1574 he was again at Rome, and the See of Cork and Cloyne being vacant, he was appointed to it, 5 November 1574, and was consecrated at Rome.

In May, 1575, Tanner set out for Ireland with exceptional faculties for his own diocese and for those of Cashel, Dublin, and its suffragan sees in the absence of their respective prelates. Not long after his reaching Ireland he was captured while exercising his functions at Clonmel, and was thrown into prison; here, as Holing tells, he was visited by a Protestant bishop whom he reconciled to the Church. A few days later he was himself released through the influence of a noble earl.

Thereafter he did not venture into his own diocese but as Commissary Apostolic he traversed the other districts assigned him, administering the sacraments and discharging in secret the other duties of his office. After four years he died in the Diocese of Ossory, 4 June 1579. Anthony Bruodin states that he died in Dublin Castle after eighteen months of imprisonment and torture. On the other hand, Fennessy in the Oxford Dictionary of National Biography writes that he died at Cullahill, where his host was Barnaby Fitzpatrick.
