= Maoilín Óg Mac Bruaideadha =

Irish poet and man of letters

Maoilín Óg Mac Bruaideadha, was an Irish poet and man of letters, who translated the New Testament into Irish at Trinity College, Cambridge. He died 31 December 1602 and was succeeded by his son, Concubhair Mac Bruideadha. The names of both father and son crop up repeatedly as jurors and arbitrators in official documents preserved in the Inchiquin Manuscripts.

== Background ==
Maoilin Óg Mac Bruideadha was of Kilkee, in the parish of Dysart, County Clare. He succeeded his father, Maoilin mac Conor mac Diarmait mac John Mac Bruaideadha, as ollamh upon his death in 1582.

== Records ==
Under the year 1599, the Annals of the Four Masters record an episode concerning him:

The learned historian and poet, Mac Brody (Maoilin Oge), represented that it was in revenge of the demolition of Grianan Oiligh, formerly, by Murtough More, son of Turlough [son of Teige], son of Brian Boroimhe, that God, in consequence of the curse of Columbkille upon the O'Briens, had permitted Thomond to be totally plundered and devastated on this occasion by O'Donnell. This Maoilin Oge came to O'Donnell, to request of him the restoration of his cattle, which a party of the troops had carried off; and they were all given back to him; upon which Maoilin composed the following quatrain: It was destined that, in revenge of Oileach/O Hugh Roe! the Prophet announced/Thy troops should come to the land of Magh-Adhair;/From the North the aid of all is sought.

The Annals of the Four Masters, sub anno 1602, contain Mac Bruaideadha's obituary:

Mac Brody (Maoilin Oge, the son of Maoilin, son of Conor) died on the last day of the month of December. There was not in Ireland, in the person of one individual, a better historian, poet, and rhymer, than he. It was he who composed these historical poems in Dán-Direacht:

- I will lay an obligation on the descendants of Tál. Give thy attention to me, O Inis-an-laoigh Ennis. Know me, O Mac Coghlan! Let us make this visitation among the descendants of Cas. The descendants of Cathaoir are exiles here. From four the Gadelians have sprung.

== Translation work ==
According to Professor Leerssen, he was also one of the few native literati to embrace the new order even to the extent that he was in the employ of Trinity College for a period in the early to mid-1590s, and was also one of those involved with the Gaelic translation of the New Testament, undertaken for purposes of proselytization by the protestant archbishop of Tuam.

== Poems ==
Six of Maoilín Óg's poems are listed by O’Donovan in the Annals of the Four Masters. They include Brathair don bhás an doidhbhreas (Poverty is death’s brother), addressed to Connor O'Brien, 3rd Earl of Thomond, included in a collection edited by Professor T. F. O'Rahilly.
