= Tadhg mac Dáire Mac Bruaideadha =

Irish Gaelic poet and historian

Tadhg mac Dáire Mac Bruaideadha) (1570–1652) was an Irish Gaelic poet and historian.

== Biography ==
Born in County Clare to a family of chroniclers for the Earl of Thomond, Tadhg mac Dáire Mac Bruaideadha was most recognised for beginning the Contention of the bards. He attacked the bard Torna Eigeas by composing a poem that claimed superiority of the O'Briens over the O'Neills, or the southern septs of Ireland over the north. He was ollamh to Donnchadh Ó Briain. In 1652 he was assassinated by marauding soldiers of Oliver Cromwell’s army.

Among his family was a brother, Domhnall mac Dáire Mac Bruaideadha.

== See also ==
- Seán Buí Mac Bruideadha, fl. 1300s.
- Diarmuid Mac Bruideadha, d. 1563.
