= 1549 in Ireland =

- Centuries: 14th; 15th; 16th; 17th; 18th
- Decades: 1520s; 1530s; 1540s; 1550s; 1560s
- See also: Other events of 1549; List of years in Ireland

Events from the year 1549 in Ireland.

== Incumbent ==
- Monarch: Edward VI

== Events ==
- January – William St Loe is knighted in Dublin for services in Ireland.
- Plantation of Leix and Offaly starts (continues until they are established as Queen's and King's Counties in 1557).
- Fionnuala Ní Flaithbheartaigh conspires with her brother, Domhnall mac Ruairi Oge O Flaithbheartaigh, to murder her late husband's son Walter Fada Burke and seize his castle and lands of Inverin.

== Births ==
- Probable date – Thomas Field, Jesuit explorer (d. 1625)

== Deaths ==
- July 31 – Thomas Eustace, 1st Viscount Baltinglass, landowner (b. c.1480)
- c. December 23 – Matthew Sanders, Bishop of Leighlin.
- Sir Edward Bellingham, former Lord Deputy of Ireland (b. 1506)
