= 1547 in Ireland =

- Centuries: 14th; 15th; 16th; 17th; 18th
- Decades: 1520s; 1530s; 1540s; 1550s; 1560s
- See also: Other events of 1547; List of years in Ireland

Events from the year 1547 in Ireland.

== Incumbent ==
- Monarch: Henry VIII (until 28 January), then Edward VI

== Events ==
- January 28 – Edward VI becomes King of England and Ireland upon the death of Henry VIII; start of Edwardian Reformation in Ireland (lasting until 1553).
- Summer – Patrick O'More and Brian O'Connor ravage Kildare but are driven back by Sir Edward Bellingham, ordered to Ireland in late May to restore order.
- Athlone Castle is reconstructed by Sir William Brabazon.

== Births ==
- Richard Stanihurst, translator, poet and historian (d. 1618)

== Deaths ==
- January 28 – Henry VIII, King of Ireland (b. 1491)
