= 1554 in Ireland =

- Centuries: 14th; 15th; 16th; 17th; 18th
- Decades: 1530s; 1540s; 1550s; 1560s; 1570s
- See also: Other events of 1554; List of years in Ireland

Events from the year 1554 in Ireland.

== Incumbent ==
- Monarch: Mary I

== Events ==
- April 14 – George Dowdall, Archbishop of Armagh, is commissioned to deprive married clergy of their offices.
- May 13 – the Earldom of Kildare is revived in favour of Gerald FitzGerald, 11th Earl.
- June 29 – Edward Staples, Bishop of Meath, is deprived of his office as being a married priest. The Cistercian William Walsh is appointed to succeed him on 22 November by letters patent.
- Gerald FitzGerald, Earl of Kildare and Richard Nugent, Baron Delvin, campaign against Phelim Roc O'Neill of Clandeboye.
- John Bathe is appointed Chief Justice of the Irish Common Pleas following the death of Sir Thomas Luttrell.
- Barnaby Skurloke or Skurlog is appointed Attorney-General for Ireland, the first use of the title in place of King's Attorney.

== Births ==
- Approximate date – Richard Field, Jesuit (d. 1606)

== Deaths ==
- Cahir mac Art Kavanagh, Lord of St. Molyns, baron of Ballyann.
- Sir Thomas Luttrell, lawyer (b. c.1490)
