= Irish Brazilians =

Irish Brazilians Hiberno-brasileiros
Regions with significant populations
- São Paulo · Rio de Janeiro · Rio Grande do Sul · Santa Catarina · Paraná · Amazonas · Minas Gerais · Maranhão

Languages
- Majority: Portuguese; Minority: Irish and English.

Religion
- Roman Catholicism and others

Related ethnic groups
- Other Brazilians, white Brazilians (specially Confederados), other American Brazilians and Scottish Brazilians

Irish Brazilians (Portuguese: Irlando-brasileiros or Hiberno-brasileiros; Irish: Gael-Bhrasaíligh) are Brazilian citizens of Irish ancestry, or Irish-born people residing in Brazil, and vice-versa. Many Irish immigrants to Brazil changed their surnames to resemble Portuguese names more closely, often losing the common prefix 'O'.

== History ==
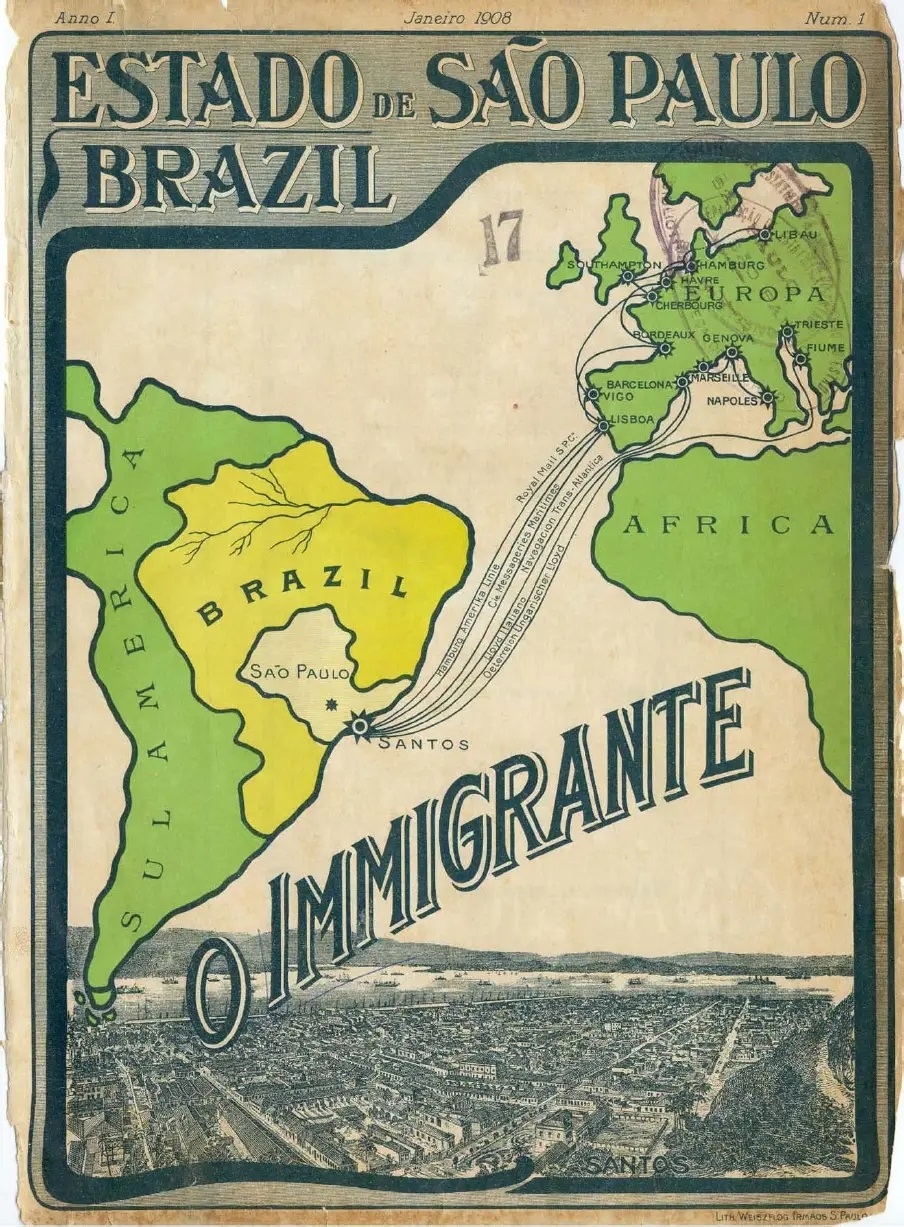
Magazine from the time, with information of São Paulo state to help and guide newly arrived European immigrants to São Paulo

The first known Irish settler in Brazil was a missionary, Thomas Field, who arrived to Brazil in late 1577 and spent three years in Piratininga (present-day São Paulo). In 1612, the Irish brothers Philip and James Purcell established a colony in Tauregue, at the mouth of the Amazon River, where English, Dutch, and French settlements were also established. Many of the colonists traded in tobacco, dyes, and hardwoods. A second group of Irish settlers led by Bernardo O'Brien of County Clare arrived in 1620. The first recorded Saint Patrick's Day celebration was on 17 March 1770.

During the Cisplatine War, Brazil sent recruiters to Ireland to recruit men as soldiers for the war against Argentina. Any Irish that signed up for the Brazilian army were promised that if they enlisted they would be given a grant of land after five years of service. Approximately 2,400 men were recruited and when they arrived in Brazil (many with their families), they were completely neglected by the government. The Irish mutinied together with a German regiment, and for a few days there was open warfare on the streets of Rio de Janeiro. While most were ultimately sent home or re-emigrated to Canada or Argentina, some did stay and were sent to form a colony in the province of Bahia.

Several attempts were made by Brazil to bring in more Irish immigrants to settle in the country, however, much of the land given to the settlers was porous or in extremely remote locations. Many of the Irish settlers died or re-emigrated to other countries. At the same time, several prominent Irish figures served in diplomatic posts in Brazil for the United Kingdom (as Ireland was part of the British Empire). Irish nationalist Roger Casement served as British Consul in Santos, Belém, and in Rio de Janeiro.

In the mid-19th century, a small Irish colony was established in Pelotas, Rio Grande do Sul, known as Colônia São João. These immigrants, fleeing the Great Famine in Ireland (1845–1852), arrived at the port of Rio Grande between 1851 and 1852, encouraged by Brazilian consular agents in Liverpool such as Admiral Grenfell and João Francisco Fróes. Although many later relocated to neighboring countries like Uruguay and Argentina, some families remained in Pelotas, including the Sinnott and Monks families. Their legacy persists in local landmarks and historical records, such as the Estação de Tratamento Sinnott (Sinnott Dam) in Monte Bonito rural district, which honors the Irish settlers in the region.

== Notable Irish Brazilians ==
- Irish Brazilians in Wikipedia

== See also ==
- Brazil–Ireland relations
- Brazilians in Ireland
- Immigration to Brazil
- Irish and German Mercenary Soldiers' Revolt
- European immigration to Brazil
- Irish people

== Bibliography ==
- Brazilian Historical and Geographical Institute -Revista do Instituto Histórico e Geográfico Brasileiro-, 1918, Tomo 83, "Alternate Pictures" "Quadros Alternados", on the mercenaries rebellion in which Irish settlers took part, according to the contemporary narrative by the Germany mercenary Theodor Bösche, page 179 onwards
- William Cotter Irish officer in Dom Pedro's army of imperial Brazil
- Irish immigrants in Rio de Janeiro: routine and rebellion, Universidade de São Paulo, in Portuguese
