= 1561 in Ireland =

- Centuries: 14th; 15th; 16th; 17th; 18th
- Decades: 1540s; 1550s; 1560s; 1570s; 1580s
- See also: Other events of 1561; List of years in Ireland

Events from the year 1561 in Ireland.

== Incumbent ==
- Monarch: Elizabeth I

== Events ==
- 8 June – the Earl of Sussex, Lord Lieutenant of Ireland, proclaims Shane O'Neill a traitor and begins a campaign against him which continues until 1567.
- 18 July – Battle of the Red Sagums: Shane O'Neill destroys much of Sussex's withdrawing army.
- c. July – English troops garrison Armagh Cathedral.
- September – Sussex makes an unsuccessful expedition to Lough Foyle.
- Elizabeth I of England introduces a higher standard of silver coinage for Ireland.

== Births ==
- Risdeard Ó Conchubhair, scribe and physician (d. 1625)
- Donal Cam O'Sullivan Beare, clan chief (d. 1618)

== Deaths ==
- Sir John Alan, lawyer and statesman (b. c.1500)
- Naisse mac Cithruadh, musician (drowned on Lough Gill)
