= 1540 in Ireland =

- Centuries: 14th; 15th; 16th; 17th; 18th
- Decades: 1520s; 1530s; 1540s; 1550s; 1560s
- See also: Other events of 1540; List of years in Ireland

Events from the year 1540 in Ireland.

== Incumbent ==
- Lord: Henry VIII

== Events ==
- Anthony St Leger is appointed Lord Deputy of Ireland and tasked with the repression of disorder, beginning the pacification policy of surrender and regrant (which lasts until 1543).
- Murrough O'Brien usurps the title of King of Thomond from his nephew, Donough O'Brien.
- Dissolution of the Monasteries – establishments dissolved include:
  - Abbeyderg Abbey, Co. Longford.
  - Abbeylara Abbey.
  - Abington Abbey.
  - Abbey of Aghaboe.
  - Aghmacart Priory, Co. Laois.
  - Augustinian Friary of the Holy Trinity and Franciscan Friary, Dublin.
  - Ballynasaggart Friary, Co. Longford.
  - Black Abbey, Grey Friary, Kilkenny Abbey and St. John's Abbey, Kilkenny.
  - Buttevant Franciscan Friary.
  - Cahir Priory.
  - Callan Augustinian Friary.
  - Carrickfergus Friary.
  - Cashel Dominican and Franciscan Friaries.
  - Castledermot Friary and Priory.
  - Clane Friary.
  - Clonard Abbey.
  - Clonmel Friary.
  - Dominican Priory of St Eustace, Naas.
  - Drogheda Dominican and Franciscan Friaries and Priory Hospitals of St Laurence and St Mary de Urso
  - Fertagh Priory, Co. Kilkenny.
  - Fethard Priory.
  - Galbally Friary, Co. Tipperary.
  - Great Connell Priory.
  - Holy Cross Abbey, Holycross.
  - Hore Abbey.
  - Inchmore Priory, Lough Gowna.
  - Inislounaght Abbey.
  - Inistioge Abbey.
  - Jerpoint Abbey.
  - Kells Priory, Co. Kilkenny.
  - Killerig Preceptory.
  - Kilmainham Preceptory.
  - Monasteranenagh Abbey, Co. Limerick.
  - Red Abbey, Cork.
  - Slane Friary.
  - Trim Friary
