= 1548 in Ireland =

- Centuries: 14th; 15th; 16th; 17th; 18th
- Decades: 1520s; 1530s; 1540s; 1550s; 1560s
- See also: Other events of 1548; List of years in Ireland

Events from the year 1548 in Ireland.

== Incumbent ==
- Monarch: Edward VI

== Events ==
- February 10 – The Exchequer orders the minting of groats at Dublin Castle.
- March 8 – Order of communion issued.
- April 22 – Sir Edward Bellingham is appointed Lord Deputy of Ireland.
- August – Bellingham, accompanied by Nicholas Bagenal, defeats Irish forces at Kildare under Cahir O'Connor, who is captured and executed.
- c. November–December – Brian O'Connor of Offaly (brother of Cahir) and Patrick O'More submit to the Lord Deputy and are sent to England.
- Surviving portions of the Annals of Nenagh end.
