= 1546 in Ireland =

- Centuries: 14th; 15th; 16th; 17th; 18th
- Decades: 1520s; 1530s; 1540s; 1550s; 1560s
- See also: Other events of 1546; List of years in Ireland

Events from the year 1546 in Ireland.

== Incumbent ==
- Monarch: Henry VIII

== Events ==
- February 7 – John Bathe becomes Principal Solicitor for Ireland.
- May 30 – Cornelius O'Dea is nominated by Henry VIII as first Church of Ireland Bishop of Killaloe (consecrated 12 July).
- October 28 – Thomas Butler, 10th Earl of Ormond succeeds the earldom following the death of his father James.
- Sir John Alan, Lord Chancellor of Ireland, is removed from office by the Privy Council of England on a complaint of corruption, and Sir Richard Reade is sent to Dublin to replace him.

== Births ==
- Possible date – Thomas Field, Jesuit explorer (d. 1625)

== Deaths ==
- October 28 – James Butler, 9th Earl of Ormonde (b. c.1515)
