= Brazil–Ireland relations =

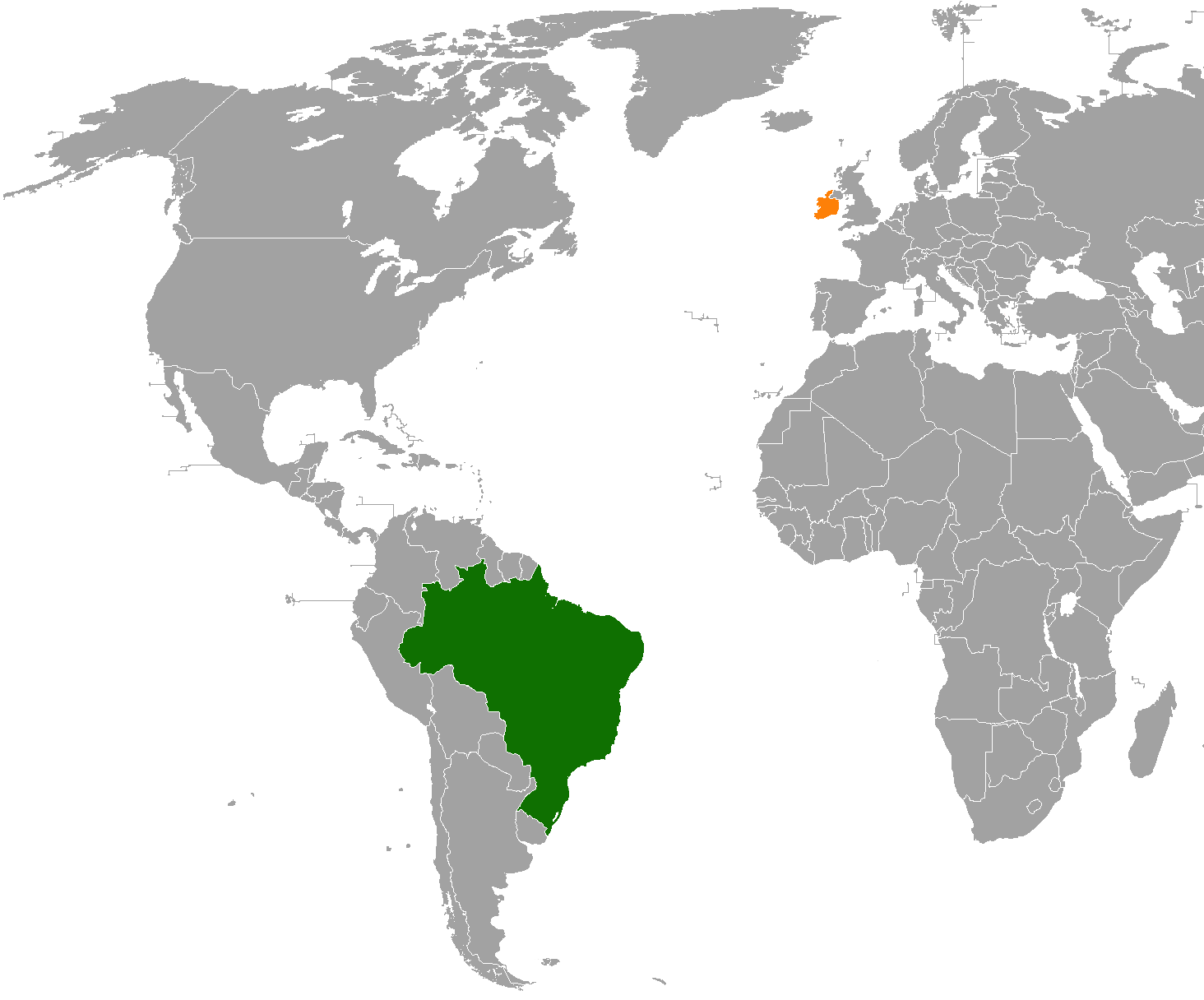

- Brazil: Ireland

Brazil–Ireland relations are the diplomatic relations between Brazil and Ireland. Both nations are members of the United Nations.

== History ==
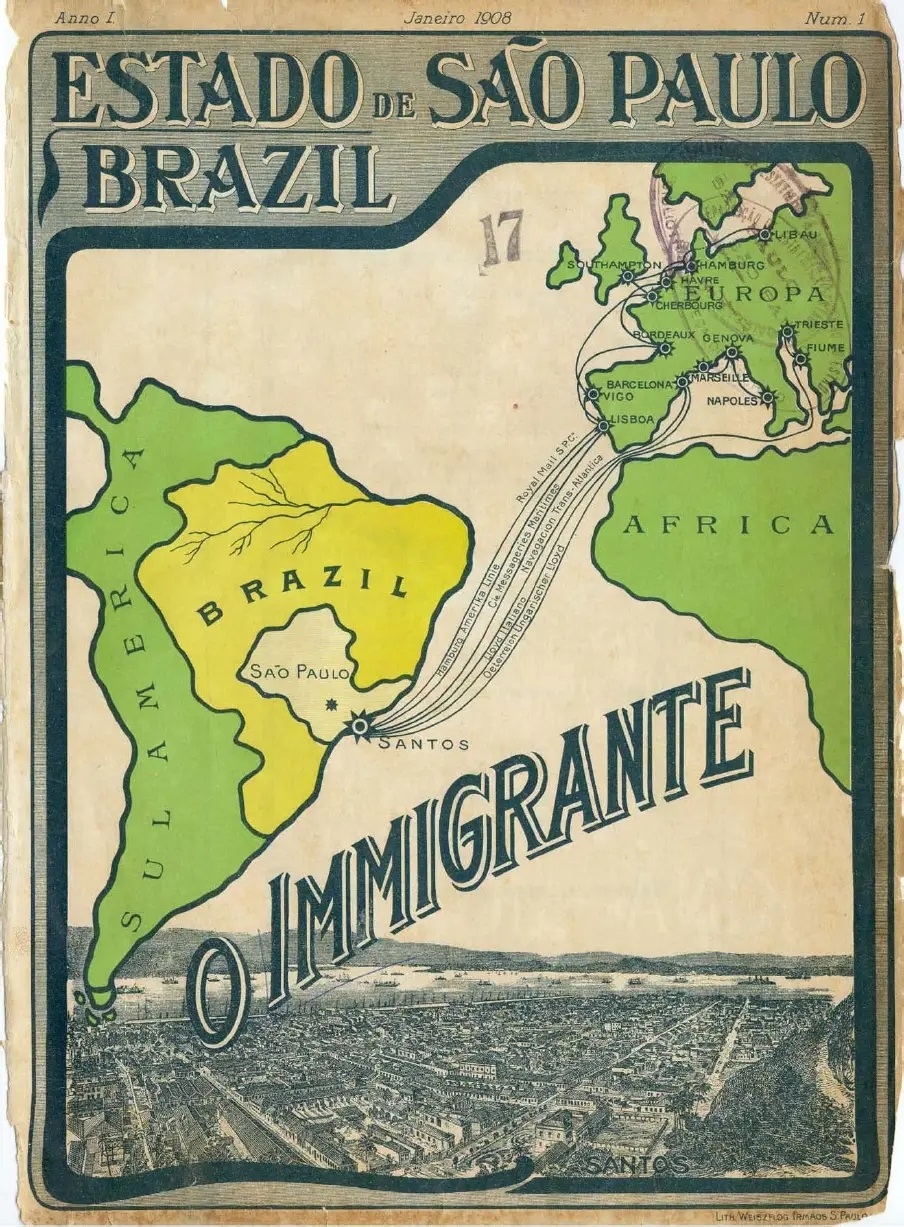
Magazine from the time, with informations of São Paulo state to help and guide newly arrived European immigrants to São Paulo

The first known Irish settler in Brazil was a missionary, Thomas Field, who arrived to Brazil in late 1577 and spent three years in Piratininga (present-day São Paulo). In 1612, Irish settlers established a colony in Tauregue, at the mouth of the Amazon river, where English, Dutch, and French settlements were also established. Many of the colonists traded in tobacco, dyes, and hardwoods. A second group of Irish settlers arrived in 1620. The first recorded Saint Patrick's Day celebration was on 17 March 1770.

During the Cisplatine War, Brazil sent recruiters to Ireland to recruit men as soldiers for the war against Argentina. Any Irish that signed up for the Brazilian army were promised that if they enlisted they would be given a grant of land after five years of service. Approximately 2,400 men were recruited and when they arrived in Brazil (many with their families), they were completely neglected by the government. The Irish mutinied together with a German regiment, and for a few days there was open warfare on the streets of Rio de Janeiro. While most were ultimately sent home or re-emigrated to Canada or Argentina, some did stay and were sent to form a colony in the province of Bahia.

Several attempts were made by Brazil to bring in more Irish immigrants to settle in the country, however, much of the land given to the settlers was porous or in extremely remote locations. Many of the Irish settlers died or re-emigrated to other countries. At the same time, several prominent Irish figures served in diplomatic posts in Brazil for the United Kingdom (as Ireland was part of the British Empire). Irish Nationalist and British diplomat Roger Casement, served as British Consul in Santos, Belém, and in Rio de Janeiro.

During World War I, Brazilian and Irish soldiers (who were part of the British regiment) fought together against German forces during the Hundred Days Offensive in France. During World War II, Brazil sent troops to Italy while a newly independent nation of Ireland remained neutral during the war, however, several thousand Irish men voluntarily choose to join the British army to fight against the Axis powers.

In 1975, Brazil and Ireland officially established diplomatic relations. In 1991, Brazil opened an embassy in Dublin and in 1995, Irish President Mary Robinson paid an official visit to Brazil. In 2001, Ireland opened an embassy in Brasília. In 2006, Enterprise Ireland opened an office in São Paulo, with operations throughout South America. In 2015, both nations celebrated 40 years of diplomatic relations.

== High-level visits ==
High-level visits from Brazil to Ireland

- Minister of Development Luiz Fernando Furlan (2006)

High-level visits from Ireland to Brazil

- President Mary Robinson (1995)
- Tánaiste Mary Harney (1999)
- Taoiseach Bertie Ahern (2001)
- President Mary McAleese (2004)
- President Michael D. Higgins (2012)

== Migration ==
In the eighteenth and nineteenth century, several thousand Irish migrated to Brazil, however, since the 20th century, the trend has reversed and over 13,000 Brazilians reside in Ireland.

== Trade ==
In 2017, trade between Brazil and Ireland totaled €1.7 billion Euros. Brazil is Ireland's second biggest trading partner in Latin America (after Mexico). Brazil's main exports to Ireland include: aeroplanes, machinery, minerals, soy, meat, fruit and wood. Ireland's main exports to Brazil include: pharmaceuticals, precision instruments, machinery and organic chemicals. There are close to 145 Irish companies actively selling to Brazil.

== Resident diplomatic missions ==
Of Brazil

- Dublin (Embassy)

Of Ireland

- Brasília (Embassy)
- São Paulo (Consulate-General)

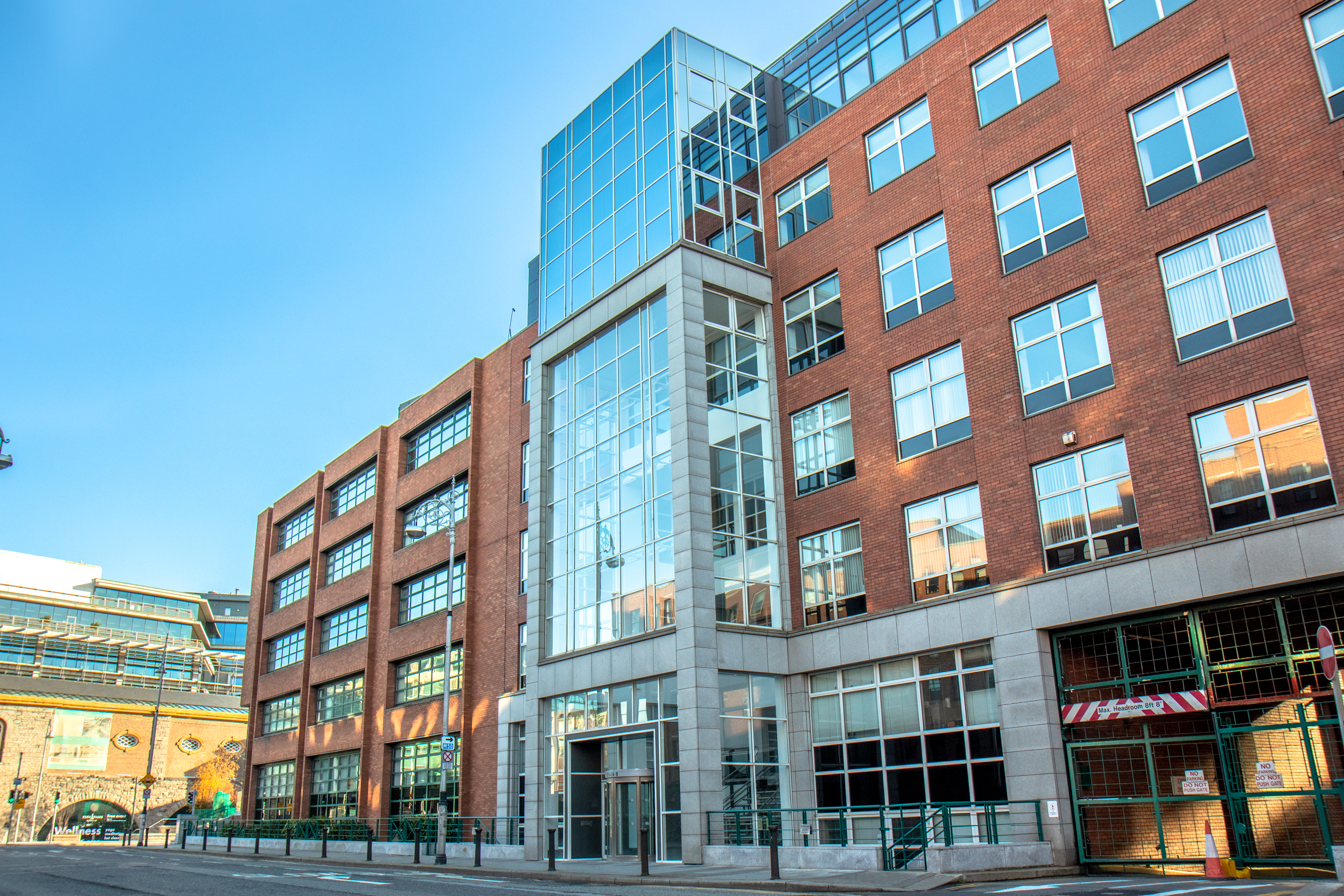
Building hosting the Embassy of Brazil in Dublin

== See also ==
- Irish Brazilians
- Brazilians in Ireland
