= Brazilians in Ireland =

Ethnic group in Ireland

Portuguese: Brasileiros na Irlanda Irish: Brasaíligh in Éirinn

Total population
- Brazilian-born residents 38,774 (2022 Republic census); 50,000 (2020 Brazilian consulate)

Regions with significant populations
- County Dublin • County Cork • County Galway (in particular Gort) • County Roscommon • County Kildare (in particular Naas) • County Laois

Languages
- Portuguese (Brazilian Portuguese) • English (Irish English) • Porglish

Religion
- Roman Catholicism and Protestantism, minority Espiritismo

Related ethnic groups
- Brazilian diaspora • Brazilians in the United Kingdom

Brazilians form the largest Latin American diaspora group in Ireland by a wide margin. Historically, Irish people tended to emigrate to Brazil rather than the other way around, but this trend has reversed since the late 20th century. The 2022 census recorded 27,338 Brazilian nationals living in the state, almost double the figure recorded in 2016 and more than six times the number counted in 2006. Research commissioned by the Brazilian embassy in Dublin suggests the true figure is considerably higher than the census total, since many Brazilians hold Italian, Portuguese or other European passports, and an unknown further number are undocumented; embassy estimates of the community's size have ranged from roughly 58,500 in 2024 to about 70,000 in 2023. By these estimates, Brazilians make up somewhere between one and 1.5% of the population of Ireland.

== History ==
=== Early waves (1990s to 2000s) ===
In 1992, Brazil opened an embassy in Dublin.

According to Paulo Azevedo of the Brazilian embassy, there have been three broad waves of Brazilians moving to Ireland: factory workers during the Celtic Tiger years (late 1990s into the 2000s), students from the 2000s to the present, and, from the 2010s onwards, engineers and IT specialists.

Jerry O'Callaghan, an Irish export manager, was working in the meat industry in Goiás, Brazil when the company he was working for shut down. He organised for the Brazilians who had lost their jobs to move to Ireland in 1999, where they found work at the Duffy Meat Plant in Gort, County Galway. Many of Gort's Brazilians originated from Anápolis, a city of around 334,000 people in Goiás state, following the closure there of a large meat-processing plant. O'Callaghan, who had worked in Brazil's meat industry since the 1970s, had already helped send an earlier group of Anápolis workers to the Kepak plant in Clonee, County Meath, before the larger movement to Gort began in 1999. By 2006, Brazilians made up around 40% of the town's population, and the town was dubbed "Little Brazil". At the community's peak in 2007, an estimated 1,600 people, again around 40% of the town's population, were Brazilian, and the community held its own annual Quadrilha festival, a traditional dance event associated with the Festa Junina season. However, the closure of Duffy in 2007 and the Great Recession jeopardised their employment and thus their residence permits, causing many to leave.

Many who left Gort during the recession returned to Anápolis, where the meat factory that had originally driven emigration to Ireland later reopened under new ownership. Return migrants described mixed experiences of readjusting to life in Brazil, with some noting that children who had grown up in Ireland identified as Irish and struggled to settle back into Brazilian schools. Chain migration was a defining feature of the community's growth in the town, with most arrivals having been brought over by a family member or friend who had emigrated before them.

A local football club, Coole FC, was founded in Gort in 2009 partly to draw the town's Brazilian population into the local sporting scene, and adopted a crest featuring the Brazilian flag alongside the Irish tricolour. A squad containing 17 or 18 Brazilian players out of a panel of 30 won the club's first piece of silverware, the Clare League Division Three title, in 2011, following a 12-game unbeaten run. By 2014, following the closure of the meat plant and the recession that followed, Gort's Brazilian population had fallen from a Celtic Tiger-era peak of up to 1,600 to around 300 to 400, out of a town of just over 2,500 people.

Other towns with meat-processing industries also recruited Brazilian workers during this period, including Roscommon and a plant in County Cavan. By 2003, around 500 Brazilians made up more than 10% of Roscommon town's population, the largest single group within a wider foreign-national community that also included Poles, Lithuanians, Estonians, Russians and Filipinos. Many worked at the Kepak meat factory in Athleague, which employed around 60 Brazilians and 15 Polish workers among a staff of 170 after the company began recruiting abroad in the late 1990s in response to a shortage of Irish labour willing to take on the physically demanding work. Kepak said Brazilian employees were paid the same basic rates as Irish colleagues, and the company employed full-time Brazilian interpreters to help bridge the language barrier faced by many workers. Some of these workers were married men who had come alone, intending to send money home and eventually return to Brazil, while others settled more permanently and brought their families over for security. Local bodies, including a working committee established by the Mid-South Roscommon Rural Development Company, sought to promote cross-cultural integration, while the Brazilian community itself organised social events such as regular "Brazil nights" of samba music at a Roscommon nightclub. Catia da Nova, an outreach worker with the South Roscommon Resource Family Centre, has described a long-standing divide between the largely middle-class Brazilian population of Dublin and Brazilians in towns such as Roscommon, many of whom had come from small towns in Brazil with little local work and took up jobs in meat factories after arriving in Ireland.

=== Student migration and the "fourth wave" (2000s and 2010s) ===
In the 2000s, more Brazilians began coming to Ireland for study. Ed Giansante of eDublin, an organisation for Brazilians interested in moving to Ireland, believes the second wave began around 2007. The reason many Brazilians seeking to study in an English-speaking country choose Ireland is that Ireland is especially accessible to them: Brazilians are non-visa-required nationals who can travel to Ireland and apply for permission to enter the state at the point of arrival, without the lengthy advance visa process required by countries such as the United States. Once here, English-language students can upgrade to a residence permit for a fee, entitling them to work up to 20 hours a week during term time and up to 40 hours a week during holidays, a considerably more permissive arrangement than the short-term study visa offered in the United Kingdom, which does not allow work at all. Many Brazilian students work in retail and food service alongside their studies.

Annie Rozario of the Gort Resource Centre suggested there had been "an unacknowledged fourth wave" in the late 2010s due to economic and political conditions back home, particularly among young people disillusioned with the Bolsonaro government. In 2021, the Brazilian Left Front (a left-wing Brazilian political organisation in Ireland) organised protests in Dublin, Galway, and Cork alongside cities in other countries in solidarity with the anti-Bolsonaro protests back home.

A parallel wave of Brazilian postgraduate and undergraduate students arrived in Ireland from 2013 as part of "Science Without Borders (Ciência sem Fronteiras)", a Brazilian government scholarship programme launched in 2011 to fund study abroad for around 101,000 students, mainly in science, engineering, technology and mathematics. Ireland's Higher Education Authority co-ordinated the country's participation through a consortium called Research Brazil Ireland; 26 Irish third-level institutions took part, with the University of Limerick, Waterford Institute of Technology and NUI Galway the most popular destinations. Some 537 Brazilians applied to study in Irish institutions in the programme's first year, rising to 973 in 2014 and 1,084 in 2015, and by 2015 the Higher Education Authority estimated that Brazil had transferred over €50 million to Irish institutions to cover tuition, accommodation and English-language courses, with participating students spending a further estimated €20 million from other funds while in the country. The programme was extended by Brazilian president Dilma Rousseff through to 2018.

=== 2020s ===
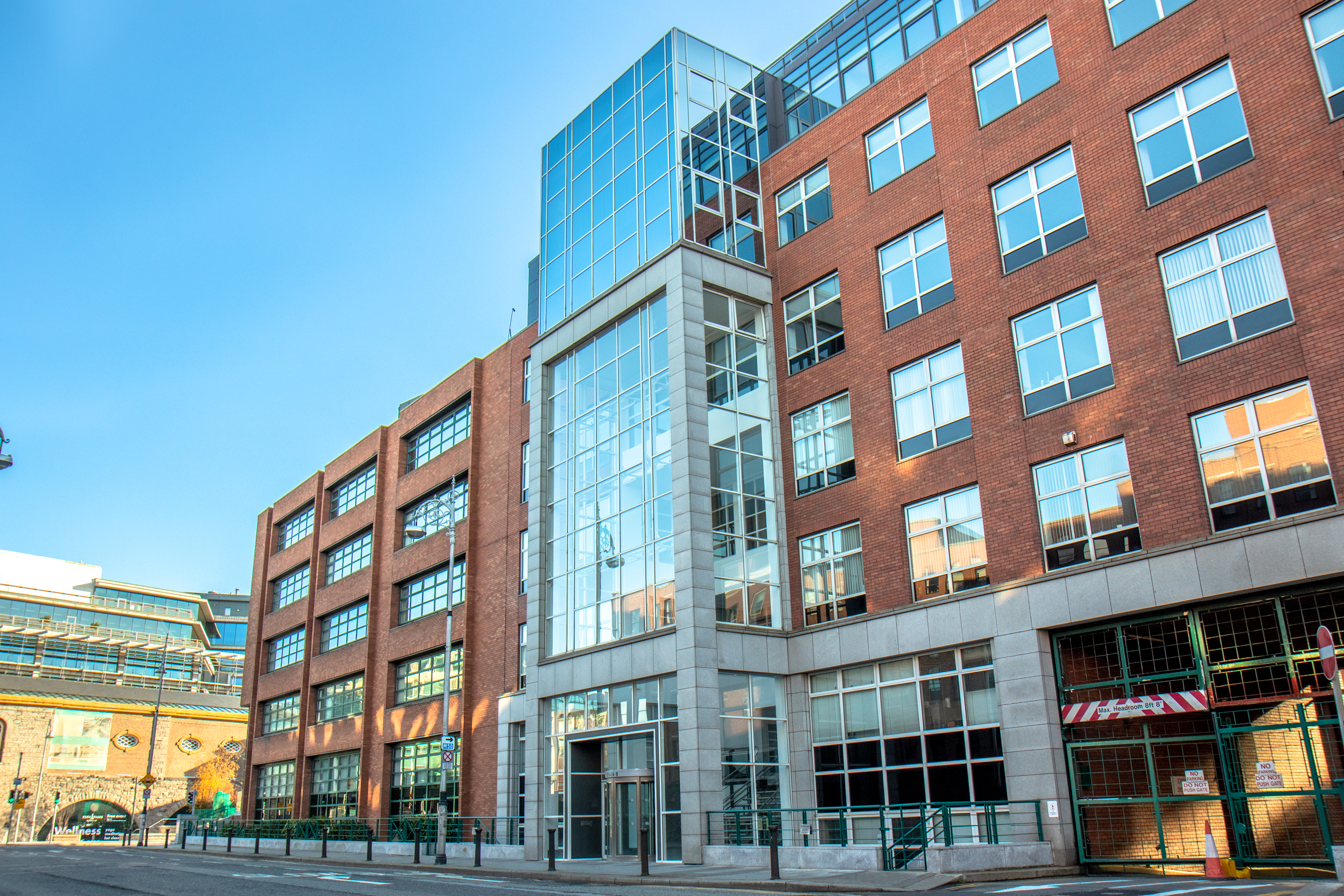
The Brazilian embassy in Dublin in 2020

The COVID-19 pandemic disrupted the community significantly in its early stages. In February 2021, Gort was home to an estimated 2,500 Brazilians, many working in construction, care work, cleaning, retail and hairdressing following the earlier closure of the town's meat plant, and community members estimated that Covid-19 infection rates among Brazilians in the area had reached as high as 30%, with several people requiring intensive care in Galway. Undocumented migrants were particularly badly affected: without a PPS number they could not claim the Pandemic Unemployment Payment when work dried up during successive lockdowns, and some returned to Brazil as a result, while the wider community organised fundraising for food hampers and medicine to support those in hardship. New travel restrictions introduced in early 2021, including mandatory hotel quarantine for arrivals from Brazil, were broadly accepted within the community despite the additional cost and inconvenience involved.

The community continued to expand through the 2020s, although estimates of its total size have varied considerably depending on the methodology used. The 2022 census recorded 27,338 Brazilian nationals in the state, but the Brazilian embassy has argued this significantly understates the true population. An embassy-commissioned survey of almost 4,000 Brazilian nationals, carried out by consultants Unleashe and published in April 2024, estimated the community at approximately 58,500 people, of whom 78.5% had arrived since 2016. Estimates issued by the embassy in other years have differed: in January 2023 it suggested a figure of around 70,000, while by 2025 and 2026 its working estimate stood at approximately 60,000.

In February 2025, members of the Brazilian community, led by Fernanda Otero of the group Casa Brazil, submitted a petition with around 30,000 signatures calling for a direct flight route between Ireland and Brazil, citing the difficulty and expense of connecting flights for family visits, particularly for elderly relatives unfamiliar with navigating foreign airports. Dublin Airport reported that 140,000 passengers departing from there in the previous year had cited Brazil as their final destination, up 20% on 2019 figures, while both the airport authority and Brazil's ambassador to Ireland, Flávio Helmond Macieira, said a bilateral air service agreement between the two governments would be needed before a direct route could be established.

== Demographics ==
The 2016 census recorded around 13,640 non-Irish national residents of Brazilian origin, a figure more than tripled from a decade earlier. A contemporary report in The Irish Times cited a slightly higher total for the same census, 15,796, describing Brazilians as the second-fastest-growing nationality in Ireland in absolute terms since 2011. Eurostat reported that 27,192 Brazilians were holding Irish residence permits in 2019, having consistently increased since 2016. This number fell to 22,481 in 2020 due to the COVID-19 pandemic. By 2021, more than 5,800 PPS numbers had been issued to Brazilian nationals in a single year, around one in every twelve issued to a foreign national, rising to roughly one in five once nationals of the European Economic Area, Switzerland and the United Kingdom were excluded from the comparison.

Brazilian population resident in the Republic of Ireland
Census year	Population
2002	1,232
2006	4,388
2011	8,704
2016	13,640
2022	27,338

The 2022 census recorded 27,338 Brazilian nationals, almost double the 2016 total and more than six times the 2006 figure of 4,388. As discussed above, embassy-commissioned research has put the true population considerably higher, at between around 58,500 and 70,000 depending on the year of estimate. The national Brazilian population grew at each successive census from the early 2000s: from 1,232 in 2002, to 4,388 in 2006, 8,704 in 2011, 13,640 in 2016 and 27,338 in 2022.

Around two-thirds (64%) of Brazilians, according to the 2016 census, were concentrated in County Dublin, the highest concentration of all non-Irish nationalities profiled. The rest were mostly found in Kildare, Galway, and Roscommon. A 2024 embassy-commissioned survey found a broadly similar pattern, with 61% of respondents living in Dublin and 8% in Cork.

97% of Brazilian nationals in 2016 were under the age of 50, with a quarter being between the ages of 25 and 28 and only 10% of them being over 40. This would make Brazilians Ireland's youngest demographic with an average age of 29.9 years old, an increase of 1 year from the 2011 data. 50% were in work and 32% were students. According to the Ruban Company, over half of international students from Brazil between 2016 and 2020 were women. By 2022, almost 80% of Brazilians living in Ireland were aged between 23 and 43, with the next-largest cohort being of primary-school age, and Brazilians ranked, after Indian and British nationals, among the largest non-EU nationality groups in the state.

The 2024 embassy survey found that 85% of respondents held third-level qualifications, a marked change from the largely unskilled labour that characterised earlier waves of migration, and that a growing number of Brazilians worked in fields such as information technology and professional services. A quarter of respondents said they had children, two-thirds of whom were born in Ireland, while 16.6% reported owning their own home. More than 40% said they did not intend to return to Brazil permanently, and around a quarter reported having an Irish partner. Just over half of respondents reported having personally experienced discrimination in Ireland, despite 60.3% reporting a "complete or strong" sense of belonging in the country.

== Politics ==
Brazilian nationals in Ireland are entitled to vote in Brazilian presidential elections from abroad, and turnout has historically been substantial relative to the size of the registered electorate. In the first round of the October 2022 Brazilian general election, a single polling station at the Erin School of English on North Great George's Street in Dublin served more than 10,000 registered voters, with many queuing for over two hours. Brazil's ambassador to Ireland, Marcel Fortuna Biato, described the community's voters as predominantly young professionals and students in their twenties and thirties. Of the 7,688 people who voted, around 80% backed the Workers' Party candidate and former president Luiz Inácio Lula da Silva, broadly consistent with the wider trend among overseas Brazilian voters.

For the run-off vote later that month, polling moved to a larger venue at Croke Park, where 16 electronic voting machines processed votes from roughly two-thirds of the state's 12,000 registered Brazilian voters who were expected to cast a ballot. Lula won the Irish vote for a second time, defeating the incumbent Bolsonaro, although voters interviewed on the day expressed a range of views, with some backing Bolsonaro's record in office.

== Discrimination and violence ==
=== Street violence ===
In March 2019, members of the Brazilian community organised a protest in Dublin following a series of assaults on Brazilian nationals, including a widely shared attack on a Deliveroo delivery rider. Hundreds of Brazilians worked for the delivery company at the time, and organisers said cyclists working alone at night while carrying cash were a particular target. Organiser Raphael Duarte said many victims were reluctant to report incidents to Gardaí, citing distrust of police carried over from Brazil, fear of losing employment, and limited English. The Garda Síochána said at the time that it was not aware of any increase in attacks or verbal abuse against foreign nationals.

Concerns about violence resurfaced in April 2024 after an unprovoked assault on a Brazilian man, Roberto Gomes dos Santos Junior, in Limerick, which the victim said was racially motivated. Ambassador Marcel Biato said the embassy had engaged with the Brazilian community in Limerick and with Irish authorities to prevent further violence, while noting that a survey published the same week described the community's integration into Irish life as "seamless". The same report found that just over half of respondents had personally experienced discrimination in Ireland. Separately, Brazilian delivery rider Caio Benicio came to prominence in November 2023 after intervening in a violent attack on children and their carer at Parnell Square in Dublin.

=== Access to banking ===
Brazilian residents in the west of Ireland reported experiencing difficulty opening bank accounts in 2020, with several banks reportedly refusing applications from Brazilian customers who had limited English or whose circumstances bank staff described as suspicious. Complaints were reported against several major banks operating in the Limerick, Clare and Roscommon area, while KBC Bank Ireland was cited by multiple customers as having processed their applications successfully after other banks had turned them away. The banks involved said fluency in English was not a formal requirement to open an account, provided customers could demonstrate an understanding of the terms and conditions.

== Immigration and legal status ==
=== Study visas and financial requirements ===
Financial requirements for Brazilians entering Ireland on English-language study visas have risen substantially over time: prospective students were required to show access to around €1,000 in savings in 2010, a figure that had risen to €3,000 by the mid-2010s and to €6,665, before course fees, flights and accommodation costs, by 2026.

=== Regularisation and undocumented migrants ===
A 2017 report titled Gort is my Home, compiled by the Gort Justice for Undocumented Group and released to mark Human Rights Day, estimated that the State was losing around €41 million annually in unclaimed tax by failing to regularise an estimated 26,000 undocumented migrants nationally, and that regularisation could generate a further €11.5 million in one-off fees, €5 million a year in ongoing immigration fees, and up to €20 million annually in employer PRSI contributions. The report noted that Galway city, recorded as Ireland's most multicultural city with 18.6% of its population non-Irish, sat close to one of the country's largest Brazilian communities, many of whom had originally been recruited to work at the Gort meat plant almost two decades earlier. By the 2016 census, Gort's Brazilian-origin population had fallen to 396 people out of a total town population of 2,130, down considerably from the roughly 40% of the town's population recorded at the community's peak in 2006 and 2007.

Workers whose immigration status was tied to a single employer historically risked becoming undocumented if they lost their job, a problem that affected many Brazilians who arrived in the early 2000s to work in meat factories. The Gort Justice for the Undocumented Group, established by the Gort Resource Centre, lobbied for an amnesty for long-term undocumented migrants, a campaign that fed into the introduction of a Regularisation of Long Term Undocumented Migrants Scheme, which allowed migrants able to prove four years or more of undocumented residence to regularise their status.

=== Deportations ===
In September 2025, the Garda National Immigration Bureau confirmed it had carried out a two-month operation, in co-operation with the Department of Justice, targeting the removal of Brazilian nationals illegally resident in the state. The operation resulted in 42 deportations, including 15 people who were serving custodial sentences, and 62 voluntary returns, with Gardaí reporting nearly 100 further voluntary return applications in the operation's aftermath.

=== Airport entry and border controls ===
Difficulties at the point of entry have also been a recurring concern. In 2017, the Brazilian embassy said it had received a rising number of complaints of mistreatment of Brazilian nationals refused entry at Dublin Airport, with refusals increasing from 258 in 2014 to 312 in 2015 and 489 in 2016, alongside a corresponding rise in the overall number of Brazilians travelling to Ireland. The embassy said Irish authorities typically told Brazilian nationals refused entry that they were suspected of intending to work despite having declared other purposes for their visit, and expressed concern about the practice of holding people awaiting removal in prison accommodation. One case that drew attention involved a Brazilian woman, Paloma Aparecida Silva Carvalho, who was refused entry and held overnight at the Dóchas women's centre within Mountjoy Prison in 2017 before being granted permission to remain in the state for 10 days.

== Culture and community ==
=== Festivals and associations ===
Capoeira being demonstrated at an event in Rathmines, Dublin in 2010

Brazilian associational life expanded considerably during the 2010s and 2020s. Amigos of the Earth is a beach cleanup group started to give back to the local community. Real Events has hosted Brazil Day since 2012 as well as hosting Carnaval in February and Festa Junina in June. Writing in 2021, event organiser Raquel Muniz recalled that, before the pandemic, a Brazilian cultural event or activity took place in Dublin on almost every day of the week, and that capoeira, street music, beach futsal and dancing had all become visible features of Brazilian social life in the city's parks and along its quays. Muniz also noted the growth of dedicated Brazilian organisations, including a mothers' association, football supporters' clubs and religious groups. By 2026, an online community for Brazilians in Dublin, Brasileiros em Dublin, had grown to more than 100,000 members, who used the group to share job leads, accommodation tips and practical advice for newcomers.

In 2022, Casa Brasil Irlanda was founded as a cultural hub. In 2024, the first Leitorado Guimarães Rosa in Ireland was launched at University College Cork (UCC). The role of the leitor(a) is to promote the Portuguese language and Brazilian culture in higher education institutions abroad. UCC was chosen to host the first leitora in the country owing to its long history of teaching Portuguese, having been the first higher education institution in Ireland to offer full BA degrees in Portuguese.

By 2026, an annual Brazil Day celebration in Dublin had grown to fill the National Stadium, featuring samba, pagode, forró, capoeira, food stalls and Brazilian businesses. Major Brazilian musical acts have also toured Ireland; a 2026 performance in Dublin by pop star Pabllo Vittar drew a largely Brazilian crowd.

Brazilian community associations have also developed outside Dublin. The Laois Brazilian Support Association (LABRAS), founded in 2020, has organised an annual Festa Junina in Portlaoise as well as running Portuguese-language heritage projects, including mother-and-baby meetups, library storytelling sessions, and a dedicated Portuguese-language book collection, the LABRAS Little Library, launched in 2025 at Laois Partnership Company. The group's 2025 Festa Junina drew around 500 attendees, some travelling from as far afield as Limerick, Dublin, Cork and Kildare. In September 2024, County Roscommon held its first Brazilian Day at Kilbride Community Centre to mark Brazilian Independence Day, offering workshops in percussion, gafieira dance, capoeira, football and gastronomy alongside legal and mental health information provided with the support of the Brazilian embassy. The event followed a similar celebration held in Gort and was proposed by then Brazilian ambassador Marcelo Biato. Community organiser Catia da Nova, a founding member of the Brazilian Cultural Club in Roscommon, said the event also included a business question-and-answer session aimed at long-settled Brazilians interested in starting their own businesses.

=== Businesses and cuisine ===
Taste of Brazil in Dublin City Centre

Real Brazil Shop in Dublin

Brazilian businesses in Ireland

A cluster of Brazilian food businesses developed in Dublin's north inner city, particularly around Capel Street, including the bakery Padoca and the grocers Real Brazil Shop and Made in Brazil Market. Brazilian restaurants operating in Dublin by 2026 included Brazil House, Brasileirinho, Brasa, The Ribs and Tia Maria, the last of which converted from a Mexican restaurant after the pandemic and serves dishes such as picanha, feijoada and coxinhas alongside live Brazilian music at weekends. On Harry Street, chef Viktor Silva's restaurant Amai by Viktor was included in the Michelin Guide. Brazilian food businesses also developed outside the capital's established Brazilian enclaves: Do Chef Oliveira, a café in Portmarnock founded by Albert Oliveira and Tatiane Esporte, built a following among both Irish and Brazilian customers with dishes including coxinhas, pão de queijo and a corn-and-guava cake. Brazilian Aesthetics, a beauty salon offering treatments such as eyebrow microblading, opened in Dublin's north inner city in December 2023 and had expanded into an adjoining unit within six months, alongside a second branch opening in Portugal.

A 2024 survey of the sector found that Brazilian cuisine had become increasingly visible in Ireland since the early 2010s. However, those working in the industry described it as still under-represented relative to the size of the community. Speaking in 2024, Alicia Gonçales, a Brazilian who had lived in Dublin since 2012, said the number and quality of Brazilian restaurants in the city had improved considerably since her arrival, when most were aimed primarily at students, citing Toca Tapioca, Fabi's Grill, Tucano, Brasileirinho and Bah 33º as particular favourites. Brazilian grocery shops, often called Real Brasil or Link Brazil, operate in most Irish cities, typically offering a hot-food counter selling savoury snacks such as coxinha, empadinhas, esfihas and pão de queijo, alongside staples including guaraná soft drinks and requeijão. Some butcher counters within these shops prepare Irish beef using Brazilian cutting techniques, popularising cuts such as picanha (rump cap) that had not previously been widely sold in Ireland. Irish-Brazilian content creators Michelle Fox and Michelle Ricciardi have highlighted similarities between Brazilian feijoada and Irish stew as dishes with shared origins in economical, thrifty cooking.

== Socioeconomics ==
=== English-language education sector ===
According to data from the Ruban Company collected between 2016 and 2020, the English-language course sector funnelled over €1 billion into the Irish economy annually. A 2022 report by Bloomberg Línea put the same sector's annual contribution to the Irish economy at around €1.2 billion, supporting more than 3,000 full-time jobs, with Brazilians accounting for 75% of the more than 250,000 international students recorded between 2016 and 2020 (Mexican nationals were the next largest group, at 10%). The report profiled Cindhy Tello, a Brazilian graduate who moved to Dublin shortly before the pandemic to study English on a course chosen specifically because it permitted part-time work, and Tiago Mascarenhas, a Brazilian-born entrepreneur who founded the English school Seda College in 2009 and later launched a digital bank aimed at immigrant students who often struggled to open accounts with traditional Irish banks.

Remittances from Brazilians living in Europe to Brazil rose sharply in the early 2020s. According to the remittance firm RemessaOnline, the volume of money transferred from Europe to Brazil increased by 276% between the first half of 2021 and the same period of 2022, while Brazil's central bank recorded personal transfers from abroad of US$345 million in May 2022, up from US$193 million in February 2019.

For the third consecutive year, eDublin carried out a survey and found that 22% of the Brazilian students spent to cover their living costs. The average amount spent on food by Brazilian exchange students in Ireland was in the range of €101 to 200 per month, among 50% of the responses. In 2021, the average income of a Brazilian student in Ireland was €1,200 per month, which went up to €2,000 in 2022.

=== Business and entrepreneurship ===
In 2023, Unleashe published a report that found over 1,300 Brazilian businesses in Ireland, which had generated over €100 million in revenue. In response, a Brazil-Ireland Chamber of Commerce was established to help these businesses navigate Irish bureaucracy and import goods from Brazil. According to its president, Fernanda Hermanson, most of the businesses were in food, manufacturing, hairdressing, and IT services. 82% of Brazilian business owners were reported to be women; Hermanson attributed this to relationship dynamics in which men more commonly took engineering jobs while their partners started businesses of their own. Hermanson said 52% of Brazilian business owners found Irish business legislation "very challenging" to understand, despite Ireland's regulatory system being less bureaucratic than Brazil's, and that around a third reported difficulty accessing raw materials and supplies, some of which they hoped to import directly from Brazil.

=== Labour market and housing ===
Although a large majority of Brazilians arriving in Ireland hold third-level qualifications, many spend their first years in the country in low-skilled work such as cleaning, hospitality or food delivery, before moving into roles that better reflect their qualifications. Paula Castro, a lecturer at Trinity College Dublin who arrived in Ireland in 2014 as a qualified English teacher, has said she has met "engineers, veterinarians and other professionals working as delivery drivers or in hospitality" while rebuilding their careers. Guilherme Souza and Fernanda Hyek, both of whom moved to Ireland in the 2010s, similarly described working in retail, cleaning and hospitality jobs in their early years before moving into technology and utility-sector careers respectively.

Accommodation has repeatedly been identified as a significant difficulty for Brazilians in Ireland. The 2016 census found that a third of Brazilian households were in a house share. Overcrowding, high rents and rental scams have all been reported by Brazilian tenants and students, with some new arrivals sharing single rooms among several people or moving house multiple times within their first months in the country.

== Notable people ==
- Victor Lazzarini (born 1969), composer and researcher
- Maria Alice de Marsillac Plunkett (1942–2020), architect, designer and châtelaine of Dunsany Castle.
- Rosana Pinheiro-Machado, anthropologist and academic
- Guilherme Souza, originally from São Paulo, moved to Dublin in 2014 and was crowned Mr Gay Ireland in 2018 after finishing as runner-up and the original winner stepping down partway through his reign; Souza went on to compete in Mr Gay Europe. He later wrote for Ireland's Gay Community News about his experience of childhood abuse in Brazil.

== See also ==
- Brazil–Ireland relations
- Gort
- Irish Brazilians
- Brazilians in the United Kingdom
