= 1560 in Ireland =

- Centuries: 14th; 15th; 16th; 17th; 18th
- Decades: 1540s; 1550s; 1560s; 1570s; 1580s
- See also: Other events of 1560; List of years in Ireland

Events from the year 1560 in Ireland.

== Incumbent ==
- Monarch: Elizabeth I

== Events ==
- January – Act of Supremacy (Ireland) Act passed.
- Queen Elizabeth I of England and Ireland orders the Lord Lieutenant of Ireland, the Earl of Sussex, to appoint John Challoner of Dublin as the first Chief Secretary for Ireland "because at this present there is none appointed to be Clerk of our Council there, and considering how more meet it were, that in our realm there were for our honour one to be our Secretary there for the affairs of our Realm".

== Births ==
- Sir Valentine Blake, merchant (d. 1635)
- Florence MacCarthy, The MacCarthy Mór, Prince of Carbery (d. 1640)
- Fláithrí Ó Maol Chonaire, Franciscan (d. 1629)
- Possible date – Constantine Ó Nialláin, soldier and Capuchin friar (d. after 1621)

== Deaths ==
- Luke Netterville, judge (b. c.1510)
