= 1564 in Ireland =

- Centuries: 14th; 15th; 16th; 17th; 18th
- Decades: 1540s; 1550s; 1560s; 1570s; 1580s
- See also: Other events of 1564; List of years in Ireland

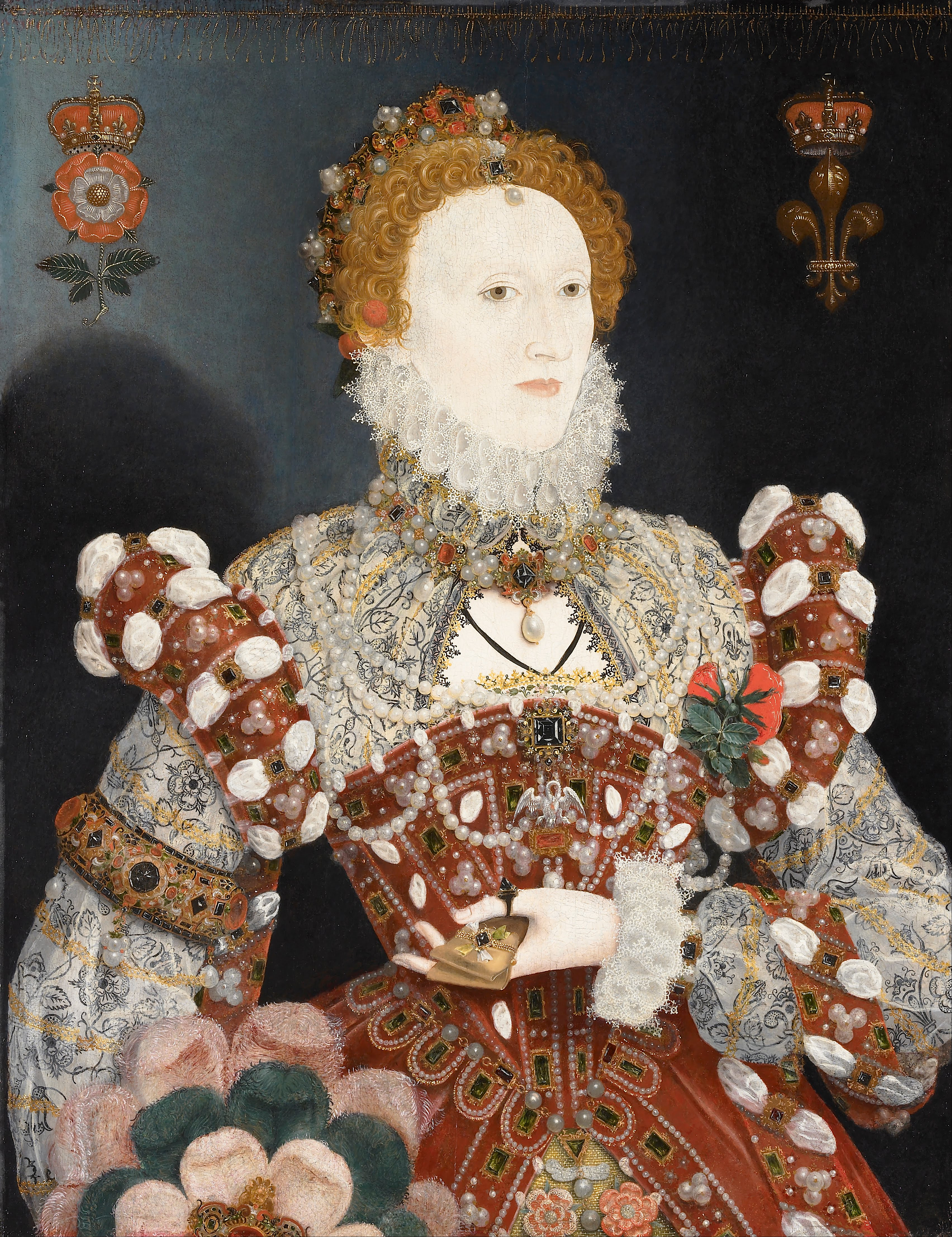
Queen of Ireland, Elizabeth I

Events from the year 1564 in Ireland.

== Incumbent ==
- Monarch: Elizabeth I
- Lord Deputy of Ireland: Thomas Radclyffe, 3rd Earl of Sussex
- Archbishop of Armagh: Adam Loftus
- Archbishop of Dublin: Hugh Curwen

== Events ==
- Shane O'Neill defeats Sorley Boy MacDonnell near Coleraine.
- 16 August – A proclamation issued by the Irish administration declares that all persons assisting the rebel O'Connor and his supporters are to be treated as traitors and rebels.

== Births ==
- 2 April – William Bathe, Jesuit priest and linguist (d. 1614)

== Deaths ==
- 9 February – Manus O'Donnell, clan chief.
