= Murtogh O'Brien-Arra =

Murtogh O'Brien (c. 1545 – 30 April 1613) was an Anglican bishop of Killaloe, in County Clare, Ireland.

He was of a branch of the clan O'Brien known as O'Brien-Arra, from County Tipperary. His seat was St. Flannan's Cathedral in Killaloe, which was actually built by his 10-Great Grandfather, Donal Ó Briain, King of Thomond, King of Munster, in the later 12th century. It is named for Saint Flannan Uí Thoirdhealbhaigh, son of Toirdhealbhach Uí Bloid, a direct ancestor of Bishop O'Brien.

Murtogh was born to Roman Catholic parents, Turlogh Ó Briain and Máire Ó Cearbhaill. He was educated in England at Magdalene College, Cambridge, and became an Anglican priest. On 15 May 1570, he was appointed Protestant Bishop of Killaloe by Elizabeth I; however, he was not consecrated until six years later.

Even before his appointment, because of his family's position of power in the kingdom of Thomond, O'Brien received all of the profits from that see. O'Brien ruled his diocese for 36 years before voluntarily retiring in 1612. He married Slaney O'Brien, of Clan O'Brien, Inchiquin branch. She was the daughter of Murrough O'Brien, Baron of Inchiquin. They were known to have two sons; Turlogh O'Brien and John O'Brien. O'Brien died on 30 April 1613 in Killaloe.
