= 1556 in Ireland =

- Centuries: 14th; 15th; 16th; 17th; 18th
- Decades: 1530s; 1540s; 1550s; 1560s; 1570s
- See also: Other events of 1556; List of years in Ireland

Events from the year 1556 in Ireland.

== Incumbent ==
- Monarch: Mary I

== Events ==
- April – Thomas, Viscount Fitzwalter is appointed Lord Deputy of Ireland.
- The Plantations of King's County (now County Offaly) and Queen's County (now County Laois) are started, shiring the Kingdom of Uí Failghe and displacing the O'Moore and O'Connor clans. This is the earliest attempt at systematic ethnic cleansing by the English in Ireland. The plantations are named after the new Catholic monarchs Philip and Mary respectively. The new county towns are named Philipstown (now Daingean) and Maryborough (now Portlaoise). An Act is passed "whereby the King and Queen's Majesties, and the Heires and Successors of the Queen, be entituled to the Counties of Leix, Slewmarge, Irry, Glinmaliry, and Offaily, and for making the same Countries Shire Grounds."

== Deaths ==
- George Browne (archbishop of Dublin).
- Uaithne Ó Cobhthaigh, poet (murdered).
- Approximate date – Brian mac Cathaoir O Conchobhair Failghe, last king of Uí Failghe.
