= 1558 in Ireland =

- Centuries: 14th; 15th; 16th; 17th; 18th
- Decades: 1530s; 1540s; 1550s; 1560s; 1570s
- See also: Other events of 1558; List of years in Ireland

Events from the year 1558 in Ireland.

== Incumbent ==
- Monarch: Mary I (until 17 November), then Elizabeth I

== Events ==
- November 17 – the Protestant Elizabeth I succeeds as Queen of England and Ireland upon the death of her Catholic half-sister Mary I. The Elizabethan Religious Settlement follows.
- Sorley Boy MacDonnell obtains lordship of the clan territory in Antrim from James MacDonald, 6th of Dunnyveg.

== Deaths ==
- Autumn – Richard St Lawrence, 7th Baron Howth, nobleman and soldier (b. c.1510)
- October 27 – James FitzGerald, 14th Earl of Desmond.
- November 17 – Mary I, Queen of Ireland (b. 1516)
- Thomas Butler, 1st Baron Cahir.
- Matthew O'Neill, 1st Baron Dungannon was assassinated
- Colla MacDonnell, Lord of Islay and Kintyre (Cantire), died at Kinbane Castle
