= 1542 in Ireland =

- Centuries: 14th; 15th; 16th; 17th; 18th
- Decades: 1520s; 1530s; 1540s; 1550s; 1560s
- See also: Other events of 1542; List of years in Ireland

Events from the year 1542 in Ireland.

== Incumbent ==
- Lord/Monarch: Henry VIII

== Events ==
- 15 February – 7/10 March: the Parliament of Ireland meets in Limerick and re-enacts the Crown of Ireland Act, declaring King Henry VIII of England and his heirs to be Kings of Ireland, for the benefit of Munster and Connacht.
- February–March – first Jesuit mission to Ireland.
- June 18 – Crown of Ireland Act 1542 is enacted, ending the Lordship of Ireland and creating the Kingdom of Ireland.
- August 8 – St Macartan's Cathedral, Clogher, is created from the former abbey church.
- September 7 – Bernard O'Higgins is consecrated as Roman Catholic Bishop of Elphin.
- Dissolution of the Monasteries – establishments dissolved include:
  - Armagh Friary.
  - Ballintubber Abbey.
  - Claregalway Friary.
  - Fermoy Monastery.
  - Kells Abbey, Co. Antrim (1 February).
  - Kilcrea Friary (friars remaining in occupancy under protection of the MacCarthy family).
  - Knockmoy Abbey (24 May).
  - Movilla Abbey.
  - Rattoo Abbey, Ballyduff, County Kerry.
  - Timoleague Friary.
  - Woodburn Abbey, Co. Antrim (1 March).
  - Youghal Nunnery.
- November 25 - Counties of Meath and Westmeath Act shires these two counties.

== Births ==
- Edmund O'Donnell, Jesuit martyr (k. 1575)

== Deaths ==
- August 9 – Margaret FitzGerald, Countess of Ormond, noblewoman.
- Christopher St Lawrence, 5th Baron Howth, nobleman (b. c.1485)
