= 1543 in Ireland =

- Centuries: 14th; 15th; 16th; 17th; 18th
- Decades: 1520s; 1530s; 1540s; 1550s; 1560s
- See also: Other events of 1543; List of years in Ireland

Events from the year 1543 in Ireland.

== Incumbent ==
- Monarch: Henry VIII

== Events ==
- April 19 – George Dowdall is nominated as Archbishop of Armagh (Church of Ireland) by King Henry VIII of England following the death of George Cromer; he is consecrated in December.
- July 1
  - Murrough O'Brien surrenders his Irish royalty to King Henry VIII of England and in the same year becomes a member of the Privy Council of England and is raised to the Peerage of Ireland as 1st Earl of Thomond and 1st Baron Inchiquin and may have reconstructed Dromoland Castle.
  - Ulick na gCeann Burke is created 1st Baron of Dunkellin and 1st Earl of Clanricarde in the Peerage of Ireland.
- November 10 – Thomas Butler is created 1st Baron of Caher in the Peerage of Ireland.

== Deaths ==
- March 16 – George Cromer, Archbishop of Armagh (Church of Ireland).
- Muirgheas mac Pháidín Ó Maolconaire, scribe.
