= 1541 in Ireland =

- Centuries: 14th; 15th; 16th; 17th; 18th
- Decades: 1520s; 1530s; 1540s; 1550s; 1560s
- See also: Other events of 1541; List of years in Ireland

Events from the year 1541 in Ireland.

== Incumbent ==
- Lord: Henry VIII

== Events ==
- June 11
  - The Barony of Dunboyne is created by patent in the Peerage of Ireland in favour of Edmond Butler.
  - The Barony of Upper Ossory is created in the Peerage of Ireland in favour of Barnaby Fitzpatrick.
- June 18 – by the Crown of Ireland Act, the Parliament of Ireland, meeting in Dublin, declares King Henry VIII of England and his heirs to be Kings of Ireland, replacing the Lordship of Ireland with the Kingdom of Ireland.
- September – 28 December: County Tyrone is pacified by Anthony St Leger (Lord Deputy of Ireland); Conn O'Neill submits to royal authority at Dundalk.
- Dissolution of the Monasteries – establishments dissolved include:
  - Abbeymahon Abbey.
  - Athassel Priory.
  - Ballybeg Priory.
  - Castlelyons Friary.
  - Cathedral of the Holy Trinity, Dublin.
  - Dungarvan Priory.
  - Glanworth Abbey (February).
  - Glascarrig Priory, County Wexford.
  - Grey Abbey, Greyabbey (1 February).
  - Inch Abbey.
  - Kilconnell Friary.
  - Kilmallock Friary.
  - Limerick Priory.
  - Molana Abbey.
  - Newtownards Priory (February).
  - Quin Abbey.
  - Rincrew Abbey.
  - St. Katherine's Abbey, Monisternagalliaghduff.
- The Honorable Society of King's Inns is created in Dublin.
- The Barony of Louth is created in the Peerage of Ireland in favour of Oliver Plunkett.

== Deaths ==
- July 28 – Leonard Grey, 1st Viscount Grane, Lord Deputy of Ireland, died by execution (b. 1479/1492)
