= 1562 in Ireland =

- Centuries: 14th; 15th; 16th; 17th; 18th
- Decades: 1540s; 1550s; 1560s; 1570s; 1580s
- See also: Other events of 1562; List of years in Ireland

Events from the year 1562 in Ireland.

== Incumbent ==
- Monarch: Elizabeth I

== Events ==
- January 6 – Shane O'Neill pleads his cause at the Palace of Whitehall in London before Elizabeth I of England, who recognises him as "The O'Neill" and "of Tír Eoghain". He returns to Ireland on 26 May.
- April 12 – Brian O'Neill is murdered by his kinsman Turlough Luineach O'Neill and is succeeded (in the eyes of the English administration of Ireland) as chief of the O'Neills by his brother Hugh.
- November – Séan Ó Néill lays waste to Maguire's Country (County Fermanagh).
- The stone bridge and west gate at Galway is completed by Thomas Óge Martyn (mayor for second term 1562–63).

== Births ==
- Henry FitzGerald, 12th Earl of Kildare, nobleman and soldier (d. 1597)
- Murrough O'Brien, 4th Baron Inchiquin, nobleman (d. 1597)
- John Rider, Latin lexicographer and Anglican Bishop of Killaloe from 1612 to 1632 (d. 1632)
- Approximate date
  - Edmund Butler, 2nd Viscount Mountgarret, nobleman (d. 1602)
  - Muircheartach Óg Ó Cíonga, writer and priest (d. c.1639)
