= 1563 in Ireland =

- Centuries: 14th; 15th; 16th; 17th; 18th
- Decades: 1540s; 1550s; 1560s; 1570s; 1580s
- See also: Other events of 1563; List of years in Ireland

Events from the year 1563 in Ireland.

== Incumbent ==
- Monarch: Elizabeth I

== Events ==
- April–September 11 – Thomas Radclyffe, 3rd Earl of Sussex, Lord Lieutenant of Ireland, based in Armagh, campaigns against Shane O'Neill.
- May 18 – commission for administration of the Oath of Supremacy to all ecclesiastics and state servants.
- After September (possible year) – introduction of the potato to Ireland by John Hawkins.

== Births ==
- May – Arthur Chichester, 1st Baron Chichester, English administrator and soldier, Lord Deputy of Ireland (d. 1625)
- Approximate date – Niall Ó Glacáin, physician (d. 1653)

== Deaths ==
- Diarmuid Mac Bruideadha, poet.
