= 1544 in Ireland =

- Centuries: 14th; 15th; 16th; 17th; 18th
- Decades: 1520s; 1530s; 1540s; 1550s; 1560s
- See also: Other events of 1544; List of years in Ireland

Events from the year 1544 in Ireland.

== Incumbent ==
- Monarch: Henry VIII

== Events ==
- July 19 – September 18: First Siege of Boulogne in France during the Italian War of 1542–1546. An Irish contingent serving with the English army is led by Piers Power, 2nd Lord Le Power and Curraghmore who is fatally wounded.
- The Annals of Connacht end.

== Births ==
- Christopher Nugent, noble (d. 1602)

== Deaths ==
- c. March – Ulick na gCeann Burke, 1st Earl of Clanricarde, Clanricarde.
