= 1551 in Ireland =

- Centuries: 14th; 15th; 16th; 17th; 18th
- Decades: 1530s; 1540s; 1550s; 1560s; 1570s
- See also: Other events of 1551; List of years in Ireland

Events from the year 1551 in Ireland.

== Incumbent ==
- Monarch: Edward VI

== Events ==
- An edition of the Book of Common Prayer printed by Humphrey Powell, de facto King's Printer in Dublin, becomes the first book printed in Ireland.

== Deaths ==
- November 7 – Murrough O'Brien, 1st Earl of Thomond, peer.
