= 1555 in Ireland =

- Centuries: 14th; 15th; 16th; 17th; 18th
- Decades: 1530s; 1540s; 1550s; 1560s; 1570s
- See also: Other events of 1555; List of years in Ireland

Notable things that happened in Ireland in 1555.

== Incumbent ==
- Monarch: Mary I

== Events ==
- William Annyas becomes the mayor of Youghal in County Cork, the first Jewish Mayor in Ireland.
- Pope Paul IV issues a Papal Bull recognising Philip II of Spain and Mary I of England as rightful King and Queen of Ireland.
