= 1545 in Ireland =

- Centuries: 14th; 15th; 16th; 17th; 18th
- Decades: 1520s; 1530s; 1540s; 1550s; 1560s
- See also: Other events of 1545; List of years in Ireland

Events from the year 1545 in Ireland.

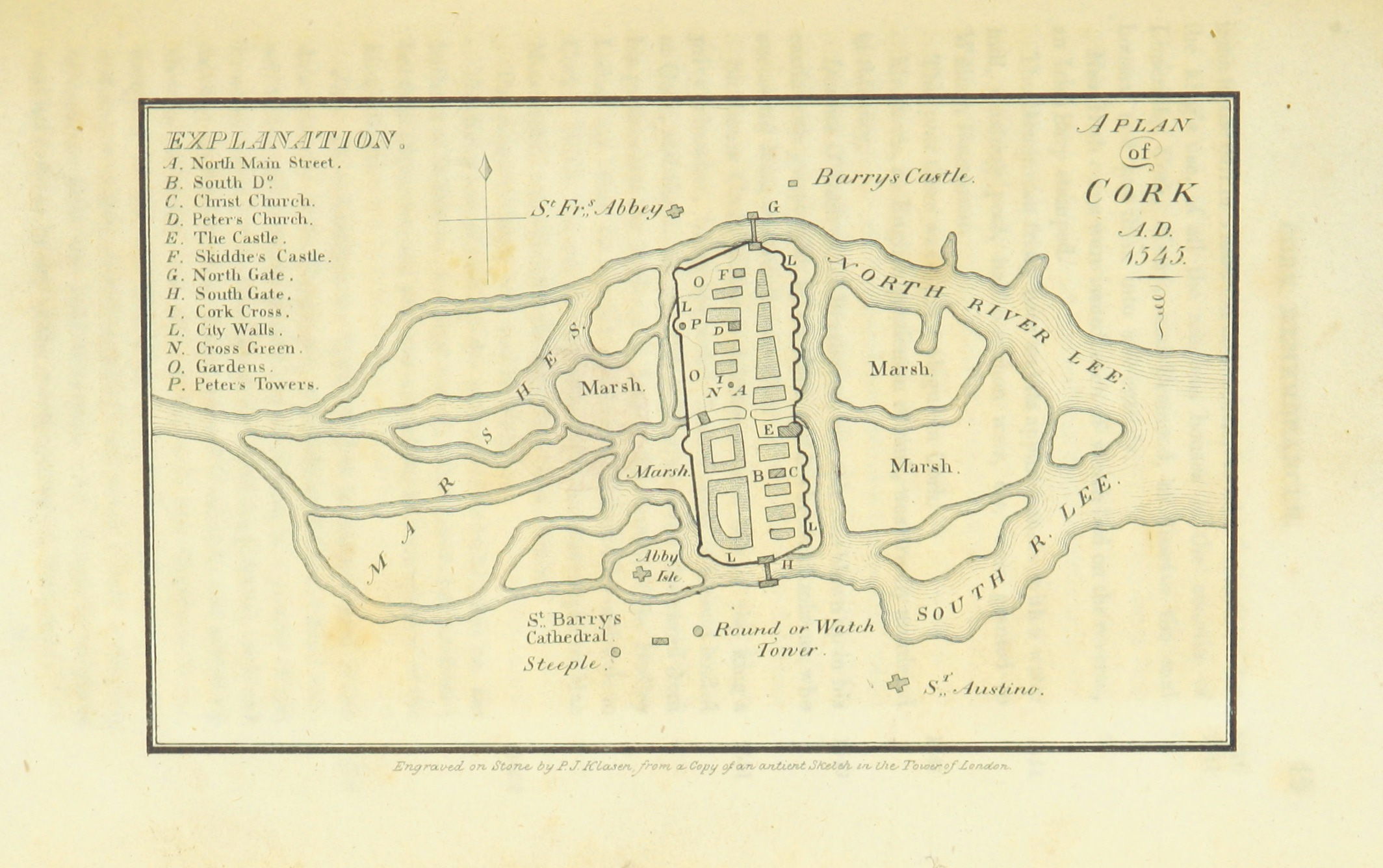
Cork City in 1545

== Incumbent ==
- Monarch: Henry VIII
- Lord Deputy of Ireland: Anthony St Leger
- Archbishop of Armagh: George Dowdall
- Archbishop of Dublin: George Browne

== Events ==
- September – the English Royal Mint issues debased coinage for Ireland.
- November 6 – Redmond O'Gallagher is appointed Bishop of Killala by Pope Paul III.

== Births ==
- Eleanor Butler, Countess of Desmond
- Richard Tyrrell (d.1632), a commander of rebel Irish forces in the Irish Nine Years War.
- Murtogh O'Brien, an Anglican bishop of Killaloe, in County Clare.

== Deaths ==
- Domhnall Dubh, Scottish nobleman (b. late 15th century).
