= 1550 in Ireland =

- Centuries: 14th; 15th; 16th; 17th; 18th
- Decades: 1530s; 1540s; 1550s; 1560s; 1570s
- See also: Other events of 1550; List of years in Ireland

Events from the year 1550 in Ireland.

== Incumbent ==
- Monarch: Edward VI

== Events ==
- February – envoys of the Kingdom of France conclude treaties with O'Neill, O'Donnell and O'Doherty.
- June 27 – the English Council resolves to establish a mint in Ireland.
- July 17 – grant to Humphrey Powell to start printing in Ireland.
- July – instructions issued to Lord Deputy for resumption, surveying and leasing of Leix and Offaly.
- Nenagh town and friary burned by O'Carroll.
- Craggaunowen Castle built.

== Births ==
- James Archer, Jesuit (d. 1620)
- Baothghalach Mór Mac Aodhagáin, poet (d. 1600)
- William Nugent, rebel nobleman (d. 1625)
- Aonghus Ruadh na nAor Ó Dálaigh, poet (d. 1617)
- Approximate date
  - David de Barry, 5th Viscount Buttevant, nobleman (d. 1617)
  - Tadhg Dall Ó hÚigínn, poet (d. c.1591)
  - Hugh O'Neill, Earl of Tyrone, rebel nobleman (d. 1616)
  - Henry Ussher, Church of Ireland Archbishop of Armagh (d. 1613)

== Deaths ==
- February 2 – Sir Francis Bryan, courtier, diplomat and lawyer (b. c.1490)
- Fearghal mac Domhnuill Ruaidh Mac an Bhaird, poet.
- Eoghan Carrach Ó Siadhail, poet (b. c.1500)
