= 1552 in Ireland =

- Centuries: 14th; 15th; 16th; 17th; 18th
- Decades: 1530s; 1540s; 1550s; 1560s; 1570s
- See also: Other events of 1552; List of years in Ireland

Events from the year 1552 in Ireland.

== Incumbent ==
- Monarch: Edward VI

== Events ==
- January – James Croft, Lord Deputy of Ireland, is commissioned to look into the state of mining in Ireland.
- February 2 – The office of Ulster King of Arms and Principal Herald of Ireland is established (based at Dublin Castle) by King Edward VI.
- June 7 – The king orders the Irish currency to be reduced to parity with that of England.
- c. July – James Croft campaigns in Clandeboye; Belfast Castle is taken.
- October 22 – John Bale is nominated Bishop of Ossory.
- October 28 – Hugh Goodacre is nominated Archbishop of Armagh by the king, the Catholic George Dowdall being deemed to have vacated the episcopal see.
- December 4 – Croft leaves Ireland; Sir Thomas Cusack and Sir Gerald Aylmer, Lord Justices, serve in his place.

== Births ==
- Approximate date – Edmund FitzGibbon, the White Knight (d. 1608)

== Deaths ==
- July 9 – Sir William Brabazon, Lord Justice of Ireland.
- Patrick Barnewall, Master of the Rolls in Ireland (b. c.1500)
