= Leighlinbridge Castle =

Coordinates: 52.7357°N 6.9781°W

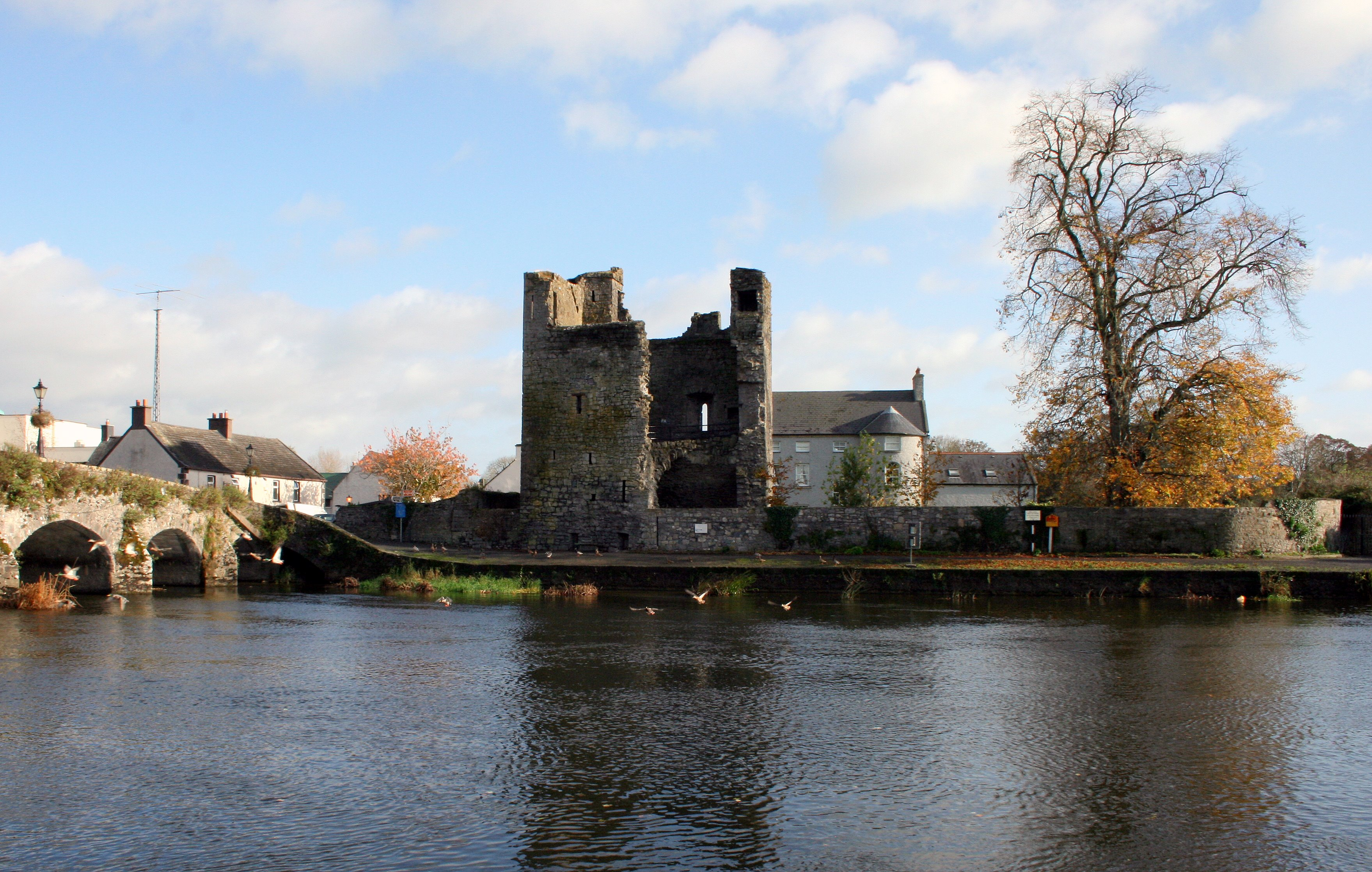
- The Black Castle on the River Barrow in Leighlinbridge
- Interactive map of Leighlinbridge Castle
- Location: Leighlinbridge, County Carlow, Ireland

History
- Built: 12th century
- Rebuilt: 1547

Site notes
- Architect: Edward Bellingham (1547)
- Architectural styles: Norman (1st structure), Gothic (2nd structure)

National monument of Ireland
- Official name: Leighlinbridge Castle
- Reference no.: 438

Leighlinbridge Castle, also called Black Castle, is in the village of Leighlinbridge, County Carlow, Ireland, on the River Barrow.

The early castle was built c.1181 for the Normans. In the 1540s a Carmelite friary was converted into a new fort by Edward Bellingham. The remains of the castle are now dilapidated - a 50-foot-tall (15 m) broken castle tower and parts of one side of an enclosing wall are still extant.

== History ==
The Norman castle, was founded c.1181 by John de Clahull (or Claville) under the auspices of Hugh de Lacy.

The original construct, together with the nine-arched bridge over the River Barrow formed the main landmarks of the town; and the construction of the castle, in itself creating a place of importance has been credited as a key cause in the development of the town of Leighlin-Bridge.

In the early 1270s the Carmelites first came to Ireland, and established their first friary in Leighlinbridge, on a site near the castle. The bridge across the river was built c.1320. Another castle, the 'White Castle' was built nearby, c.1408, by Gerald FitzGerald, 5th Earl of Kildare. By 1840 there were no remains of this castle, and its location had been lost.

In 1543 the friary was suppressed, and in 1546 Edward Bellingham converted the friary into a fort with a surrounding wall - the fort became a military center for all of Leinster. Bellingham also established a stables at the castle, of around two dozen horses.

In 1577 Rory Oge O'More of Laois is said to have captured the castle (then under the command of George Carew) and destroyed part the town; according to John Ryan in The History and Antiquities of the County of Carlow (1833) the castle was not captured and though the skirmish between assailants and defenders came to the gates of the castle it was repelled.

During the 1590s O'Neill rebellion (see Nine Years' War) the castle was repaired and re-garrisoned for the crown. In 1604 the castle was granted as socage by the king to George Tuchet, Lord Awdeley.

During the Irish Rebellion of 1641 the castle was initially garrisoned by the Catholic confederation, and in 1647 and 1649 was used as a rallying point by the Maquis of Ormond. In 1649 the castle was captured by Col. Hewson for the forces of Oliver Cromwell.

== Description ==
In the 1840s the remains of the castle itself consisted of a four sided enclosure wall 315 by 234 feet (96 by 71 m), approximately 7 feet (2.1 m) thick and enclosed on three sides by a ditch (or moat), and on the fourth by the river. The 15th C. keep was situated at the northwestern corner, rectangular in form and nearly 51 feet (16 m) tall. By the 1840s the structure was derelict, with only one outer wall remaining, and a single floor of the keep, supported by an arch still standing; there was also the remains of a round tower in the southwest corner - the remains rose to 24 feet (7.3 m) with walls 10 feet (3.0 m) thick.

A more modern analysis of the Black Castle classifies it as a three-story limestone tower house, with the lowest story vaulted, with the roof enclosed by walls with mural passageways. Both the tower and the surrounding rectangular bawn have artillery openings, and are architecturally indicative of a 16th-century building.
