= 1559 in Ireland =

- Centuries: 14th; 15th; 16th; 17th; 18th
- Decades: 1530s; 1540s; 1550s; 1560s; 1570s
- See also: Other events of 1559; List of years in Ireland

Events from the year 1559 in Ireland.

== Incumbent ==
- Monarch: Elizabeth I

== Events ==
- September 3 – Robert Dillon is appointed Chief Justice of the Irish Common Pleas.
- Shane O'Neill is elected to succeed Conn O'Neill as The Ó Néill Mór.
- Valentine Browne is appointed Surveyor General of Ireland by Queen Elizabeth.
- William FitzWilliam is appointed Vice-Treasurer and acting Lord Chief Justice of Ireland.
- Approximate date – the Church of Ireland Bishopric of Mayo is united with the Archdiocese of Tuam.

== Births ==
- Christopher Holywood, Jesuit (d. 1626)

== Deaths ==
- March – Robert Plunkett, 5th Baron of Dunsany
- Gerald Aylmer, judge (b. c.1500)
- Conn O'Neill, 1st Earl of Tyrone (b. c.1480)
- Approximate date – John Bathe, lawyer.
