= 1557 in Ireland =

- Centuries: 14th; 15th; 16th; 17th; 18th
- Decades: 1530s; 1540s; 1550s; 1560s; 1570s
- See also: Other events of 1557; List of years in Ireland

Events from the year 1557 in Ireland.

== Incumbent ==
- Monarch: Mary I

== Events ==
- June 1 – July 2: the Parliament of Ireland, meeting in Dublin, passes acts confirming the creation of King's County (now County Offaly) and Queen's County (now County Laois) with their respective county towns of Philipstown and Maryborough; repeals statutes directed against the Roman Catholic Church; declares the monarchy of Ireland to rest in Mary I of England; and acknowledges the monarch's right to amend legislative proposals. James Stanihurst is Speaker of the Irish House of Commons.
- July 10 – July 19: Thomas Radclyffe (newly succeeded as Earl of Sussex), Lord Deputy of Ireland, campaigns against the O'Connors of Offaly.
- October 24 – October 28: the Earl of Sussex, Lord Deputy of Ireland, campaigns against Shane O'Neill, burning Armagh on 27 October.
- Shane O'Neill invades Tyrconnell but is surprised and defeated by Calvagh O'Donnell at the Battle of Binnion Hill.
