= Risdeard Ó Conchubhair =

Irish scribe and physician

- Born: 1561; Ireland
- Died: 18 October 1625
- Occupations: Irish scribe, physician
- Years active: 1561-1625
- Employer: Florence Fitzpatrick, 3rd Baron Upper Ossory
- Known for: scribe

Risdeard Ó Conchubhair (1561-18 October 1625) was an Irish scribe and physician. He was part of an Irish medical family in Gaelic Ireland.

== Biography ==
Risdeard was a member of the Ó Conchubhair medical family from Ossory, Leinster, who were themselves a branch of the Ó Connchubhair Failghe dynasty, rulers of the Kingdom of Uí Failghe.

In one surviving manuscript - now RIA MS 439 (3 C 19) - he gives his genealogy, text title, patron, place and date of writing:

Finis. I am Richard, son of Muircheartach, son of Tadhg, son of Muircheartach, son of Cathal, son of Murchadh, son of Muircheartach na Cairrge O Conchubhair, who by permission of God wrote this Prognostica of Bernardus, in the school of my kinsman and master, Donnchadh Og O Conchubhair, namely, the chief Master of Medicine of Mac Giollapadraig. And Achadh Mic Airt is my place of writing. And out of the book of Fearghus Mac Bheathadh it was transcribed. To-day is April the first, 1590. Jesus. Maria.

A 20th-century editor, Paul Walsh, remarked:

I have seen but two notices of him outside his own MS., namely, H.2.7, page 345, top margin, where he scribbled a few lines of verse, and added the note : Ag sin duity a Risderd I Betecain od shesi A. Risterd mac Muircertaig; and in a note in page 349 of the same MS., which I have failed to decipher satisfactorily.

== See also ==
- Irish medical families
