= St John's Priory, Kilkenny =

Augustinian abbey located in Kilkenny, Ireland

St. John's Priory
- Mainistir Sheáin
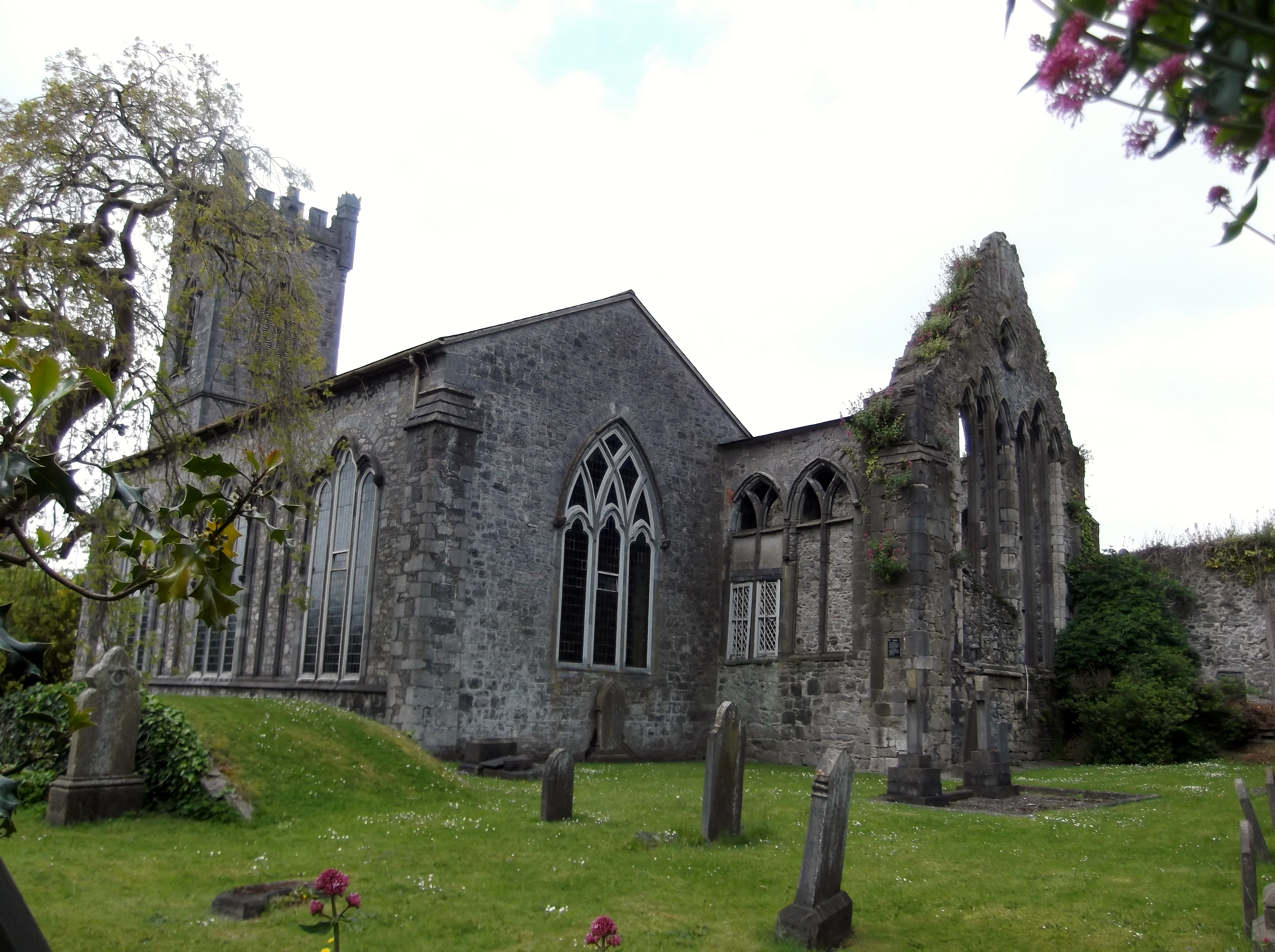

- Location within Ireland
- Interactive map of St. John's Priory

Monastery information
- Full name: The Priory Church of Saint John, Kilkenny
- Other names: St John's Priory Without the Walls; The Lantern of Ireland
- Order: Canons Regular (Augustinians)
- Established: 1212 (as Church of Ireland: 1817
- Disestablished: 1691
- Diocese: Diocese of Cashel and Ossory (Formerly Ossory)

People
- Founder: William Marshal, 1st Earl of Pembroke

Architecture
- Status: Parish church
- Functional status: Active
- Style: Late Gothic

Site
- Location: John Street, Kilkenny, County Kilkenny
- Coordinates: 52.653848°N 7.248448°W
- Public access: Yes

St John's Priory, is a medieval Augustinian priory and National Monument located in Kilkenny City, Ireland. The Lady Chapel of the priory is now used as a parish church of the Church of Ireland.

== Location ==
St. John's Abbey is located on the east bank of the River Nore, at the corner of Michael Street and John Street.

== History ==
Prior to 1200, the Canons Regular (Augustinians) had a house on John Street. Bishop of Ossory Felix Ua Duib Sláin granted a charter to Brother Osbert, the Prior of Saint John's Hospital, giving the prior the tithes of Kilkenny Castle. In 1211, William Marshal, 1st Earl of Pembroke granted land to build the Priory of St. John the Evangelist. In 1220 Mass was said for the first time in the Priory, and around 1227 the Augustinians were granted the churches of Saint Evin and Saint Mary in New Ross by William Marshal, 2nd Earl of Pembroke. In 1290 the Lady Chapel was completed. In 1329 the bell-tower collapsed.

The Prior and community of Saint John’s were imprisoned in 1331. Some time between 1361 and 1405, the Prior of Saint John’s, Walter Walsh, was excommunicated and the Priory was placed under interdict by the Bishop of Ossory.

In 1540, with the Dissolution of the Monasteries, the monastery was granted to the City Corporation.

During the Confederate era (1642–52), the site was granted to the Order of Friars Minor Capuchin. In 1645 Cardinal Giovanni Battista Rinuccini got the priory opened up to the Jesuits, but they were driven out in 1650.

After the end of the Williamite War, both orders were expelled and the site fell into ruin.

Around 1780, the nave of the main Chapel, its two towers and attendant buildings were demolished. The stone was used to build a military barracks.

In 1817 the still standing Lady Chapel was re-roofed and consecrated as a parish church of the Church of Ireland under architect William Robertson, also dedicated to St John. At this time also, a new western tower was added. It is still in use today as a parish of the Diocese of Cashel and Ossory, with weekly Sunday services.

== Buildings ==
The Lady Chapel of St John's was known for its many stained glass windows (supposedly inspired by Sainte-Chapelle, Paris, 1238–48) and the five triple lancet windows lighting the south side, and was called the "Lantern of Ireland."

The roofless remains of the chancel of the old priory church with a seven-light east window (c. 1250). Inside the ruins are late mediaeval tombs including the altar tomb of a Purcell couple (1500) with carvings of the Crucifixion and the Apostles. The effigy of the lady wears a long flowing robe and a horned headdress.

== Gallery ==
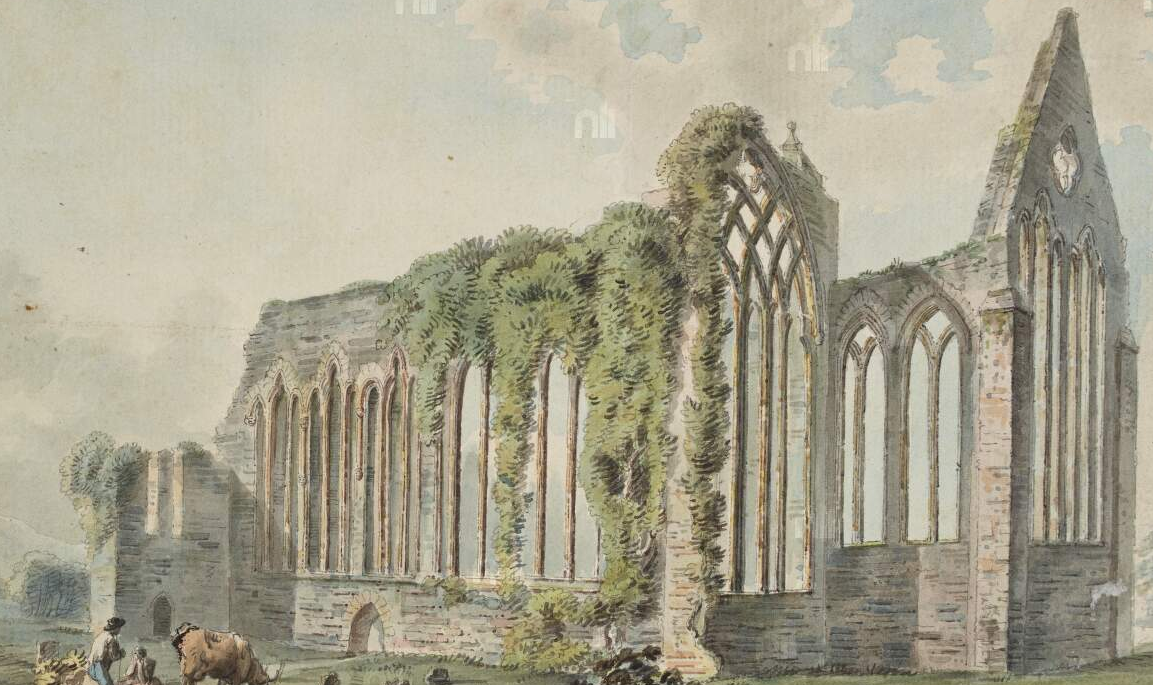
1791 drawing

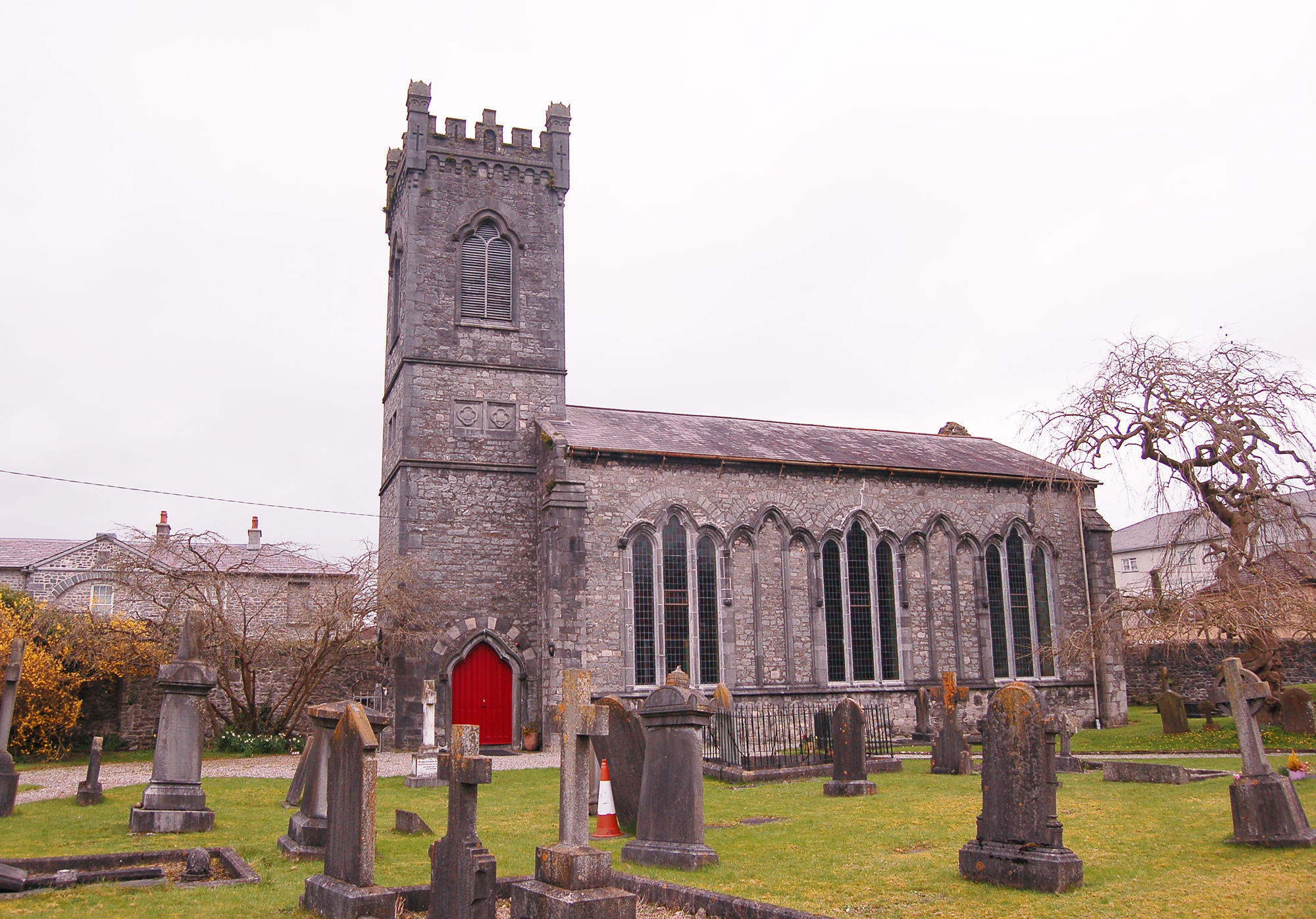
St. John's Priory as designed by Robertson

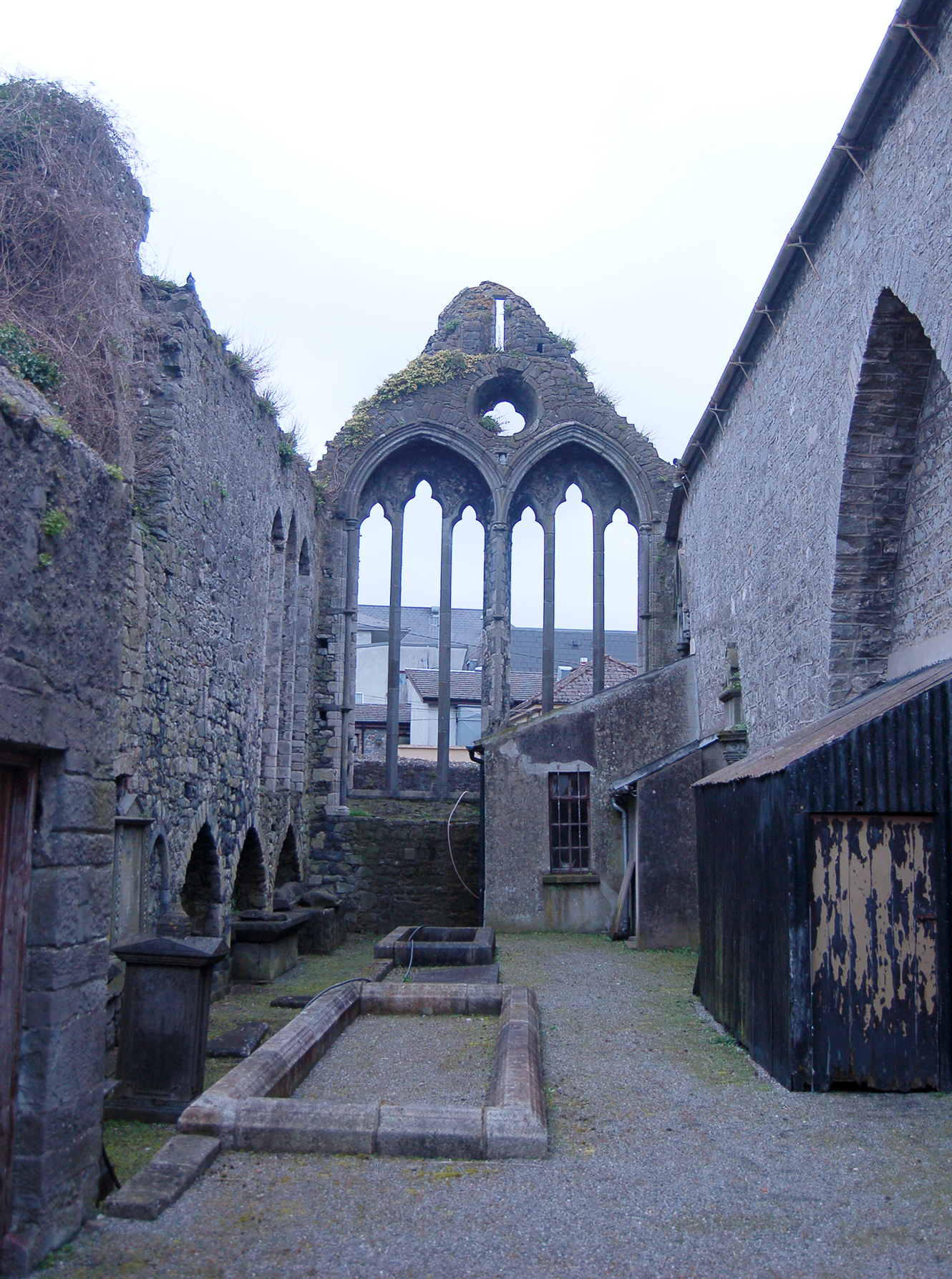
inside view of St. John's Abbey, view towards North
