= Constantine Ó Nialláin =

Irish soldier and friar (c. 1650–after 1621)

Constantine Ó Nialláin, (a.k.a. Constantine O'Nelan) Irish soldier and Capuchin friar, c. 1560?-after 1621.

== Biography ==
The "son of Dr O’Nelan of Ballyfarracnan castle, County Limerick" (p. 13), Ó Nialláin had fought as a young man against English forces in Ireland, possibly during the Desmond rebellion. Following this, he emigrated to Spain where he became a medical student at Salamanca, before turning to philosophy and theology. It was not till he was over forty years of age that he joined the Capuchin order, while in France.

Martin notes that "O’Nelan was credited with rare sanctity of life, and his biography was written after his death by Fr Raphaël de Nantes." According to Nicholas Archbold, Ó Nialláin was bald and had, by the time he joined the order, lost almost all his teeth. This latter affliction made Francis Lavalin Nugent refuse, at considerable controversy, to send him as a missionary to Charleville {in northern France} in 1621, because his lack of teeth made his speech virtually unintelligible.

== See also ==
- Stephen Ó Dálaigh
- Laurence Nugent
- Nicholas Archbold
