= Rosana Pinheiro-Machado =

Brazilian anthropologist

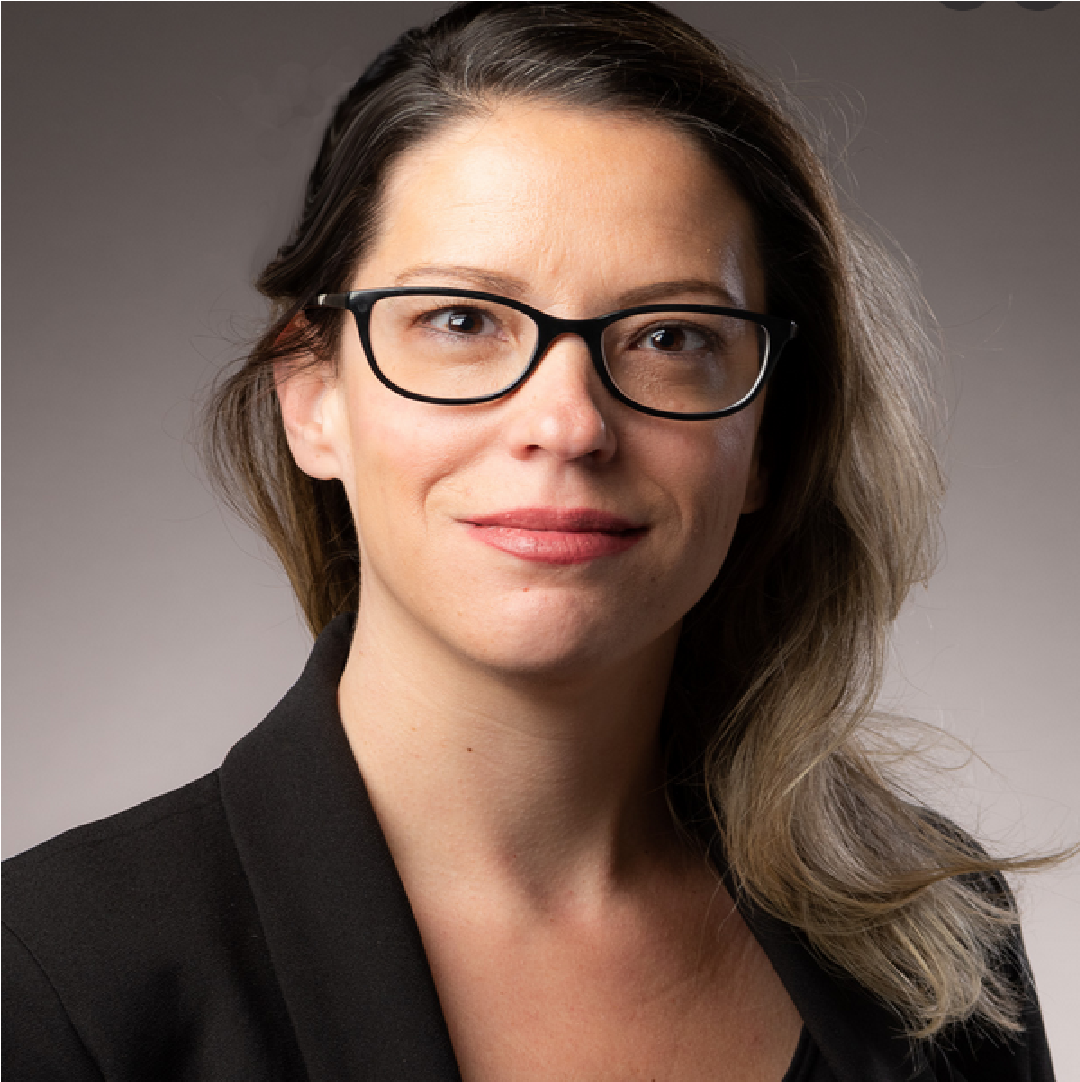
- Education: Federal University of Rio Grande do Sul
- Scientific career
- Fields: Anthropology; Sociology; Political science
- Workplaces: University of Bath; Federal University of Santa Maria; University of Oxford; University of São Paulo; Harvard University

Rosana Pinheiro-Machado (Brazilian Portuguese: [ʁoˈzɐnɐ pĩˈɲe(j)ɾu maˈʃadu]) is a Brazilian anthropologist, currently a professor at the School of Geography at University College Dublin. She has been a lecturer at the Department of Social & Policy Sciences at the University of Bath and studies the economic and political effects of trade in the Global South, particularly in Brazil and China. She is also a columnist for The Intercept.

== Education and early career ==
Pinheiro-Machado earned a BA in social sciences at the Federal University of Rio Grande do Sul in 2002, a discipline which she chose with the intention of preparing herself for a political career. However, during this program she began to instead focus on anthropology and ethnography, and continued studying for a PhD in anthropology at the Federal University of Rio Grande do Sul, completing that degree in 2009. She was also a visiting student at University College London in 2008.

Pinheiro-Machado was a lecturer at the University of Oxford from 2013 until 2016. She has also held visiting positions at Harvard University and the University of São Paulo. In 2016, she became a visiting professor at the Federal University of Santa Maria, and in 2019 she became a professor there. She also became a lecturer at the University of Bath in 2019.

== Career ==
Pinheiro-Machado has been an editor or co-author of six books, three of them solo-authored works. Pinheiro-Machado's first book was China, Passado e Presente, which was published in 2011 and aimed to place contemporary Chinese policy and society in a historical perspective for a global audience. Her second single-authored book, published in 2017, also included China as one of its main cases: in Counterfeit Itineraries in the Global South: The human consequences of piracy in China and Brazil, Pinheiro-Machado presents an ethnographic account of how inexpensive goods produced in China travel through a trade circuit in the global South, focusing on the politics of how value is produced in the exchange of those goods.

In 2020, Pinheiro-Machado published the book Amanhã vai ser maior. The book traces the events in recent Brazilian history that led up to the election of Jair Bolsonaro as President of Brazil, and argues that there are imminent opportunities for the Brazilian left to challenge the right wing government.

Pinheiro-Machado is a regular columnist for The Intercept, where she regularly writes articles about contemporary Brazilian politics and society. She has also written pieces in other prominent media outlets like The Washington Post and Jacobin, and her opinions and work have received frequent coverage in outlets like Zero Hora.

== Selected works ==
- China, Passado e Presente (2011)
- Counterfeit Itineraries in the Global South: The human consequences of piracy in China and Brazil (2017)
- Amanha vai ser maior (2020)
