= 1553 in Ireland =

- Centuries: 14th; 15th; 16th; 17th; 18th
- Decades: 1530s; 1540s; 1550s; 1560s; 1570s
- See also: Other events of 1553; List of years in Ireland

Events from the year 1553 in Ireland.

== Incumbent ==
- Monarch: Edward VI (until 6 July), then Mary I

== Events ==
- February 2 – Hugh Goodacre is consecrated as Archbishop of Armagh (Church of Ireland) and John Bale as Bishop of Ossory.
- April 1 – Donough O'Brien, 2nd Earl of Thomond, dies after being attacked by his brothers at the family seat of Clonroad. O'Brien's brother Donald is named King of Thomond by the Dál gCais, but O'Brien's son, Connor, inherits the Earldom and regains control of his lands.
- July 19 – Mary I is proclaimed Queen of England and Ireland following the death of Edward VI, leading to restoration of Papal authority (until 1558).
- October 23 – George Dowdall is reinstated as Archbishop of Armagh, restoring the Roman Catholic succession.
- October – Anthony St Leger is reappointed as Lord Deputy of Ireland.
- Bartholomew Ball was elected Lord Mayor of Dublin, his wife, Margaret Ball, subsequently a Catholic martyr, became Lady Mayoress.

== Deaths ==
- April 1 – Donough O'Brien, 2nd Earl of Thomond, noble.
- May 1 – Hugh Goodacre, Archbishop of Armagh.
- July 6 – Edward VI, King of England and Ireland (b. 1537)
- Thomas St. Lawrence, lawyer, statesman and controversialist (b. c. 1480)
- Tadhg, son of Ruaidhri Ó Comhdhain, Ollamh Érenn, musician.
