= Fionnuala Ní Fhlaithbheartaigh =

Fionnuala Ní Fhlaithbheartaigh (fl. 1545) was a Gaelic–Irish Lady.

Ní Fhlaithbheartaigh was married to Burke of Inverin, whose lands were inherited upon his death by his son, Walter Fada Burke. Ní Fhlaithbheartaigh conspired with her brother, Domhnall mac Ruairí Óg Ó Flaithbheartaigh, to murder Walter Fada. The killing was carried out by Fionnuala and Domhnall in 1549, with the castle and lands of Inverin seized by the family.

Fionnuala's subsequent fate is unknown. Myler, the son of Theobald, son of Walter Fada Burke, was executed after trying to escape from the Galway jail on Mainguard Street in August 1595.
