= Richard Field (Jesuit) =

Richard Field Or De La Field
- Born: 1554?
- Died: 1606

Richard Field or De la Field (1554?–1606) was an Anglo-Irish Jesuit.

== Biography ==
Richard Field was born about 1554 to an Old English family in Corduff, County Dublin. He studied at Douai, entered the Society of Jesus about 1582, and became a professed father. In April 1599 he was sent from Flanders to Fathers Fitzsimon and Archer in his native country, and he became superior of the Irish Jesuit mission, displaying remarkable prudence and mildness in his office. There are still extant several of his letters which abound with interesting details of the Catholic affairs of Ireland. He died in Dublin on 21 February 1606.
