= Edward Bellingham =

16th-century English politician

Sir Edward Bellingham (1506–1549) was an English soldier and lord deputy of Ireland.

== Life ==
He was a son of Edward Bellingham of Erringham, Sussex, his mother being Jane Shelley of the Shelley family. After his father's death in 1511, he and his brother became wards to the Duke of Norfolk. He served with Sir Thomas Seymour as envoys to Hungary during the sieges of Pesth and Buda before the Hungarian forces were defeated by the Ottoman Empire. He further fought through the Low Countries against the French before being captured. He was also present at the Siege of Boulogne. His most notable achievement was the defence of the Isle of Wight and repulsion of French raiding forces during the attempted French invasion in 1545.

After King Henry VIII's death he eventually became a member of the English House of Commons and a member of the privy council under the rule of King Edward VI, and in 1547 took part in some military operations in Ireland, during which time he may have rebuilt Leighlinbridge Castle in County Carlow. In May 1548 he was sent to that country as Lord Deputy. Ireland was then in a very disturbed condition, but the new governor crushed a rebellion of the O'Connors in Leinster, freed the Pale from rebels, built forts, and made the English power respected in Munster and Connaught.

Bellingham, however, was a headstrong man and was constantly quarreling with his council; but one of his opponents admitted that he was the best man of war that ever he had seen in Ireland. His short but successful term of office was ended by his recall in 1549.

There is no evidence of him having married or having fathered children. He died of ill health in 1549.
