= Thomas Field (Catholic priest) =

Irish Jesuit priest and explorer

- Born: 1549; Limerick, Kingdom of Ireland
- Died: 1625 (aged 75–76); Asunción, Viceroyalty of Peru
- Occupations: Jesuit; explorer

Thomas Field (1549 in Limerick – 15 April 1625 in Asunción), was an Irish Jesuit priest and explorer.

== Life ==
Field was a son of William Field, a medical practitioner of Limerick, by his wife Janet Creagh, was born in Limerick in 1546 or 1549. He studied humanities at Paris and Douai, and philosophy at Louvain, where he took the degree of MA. He entered the novitiate of the Society of Jesus in Rome, 6 October 1574, and was made a spiritual coadjutor. Proceeding to Brazil he spent many years with José de Anchieta, the apostle of that country. Thence he was ordered into Paraguay. In 1586, he was captured by English pirates, and put into an open boat, without rudder or oars, in which he drifted to Buenos Aires. He died at Asunción in 1625.
