= Jacob Richards (artillery officer) =

Irish soldier

Jacob Richards (c. 1660–1701) was an Irish officer of the English Army, He is noted for his innovations and influence on the development of British Artillery. Elements of his career are sometimes confused with his identically named father Jacob Richards. His two younger brothers Michael Richards and John Richards were both noted artillery officers.

== Background ==
Richards was born in Ireland, and partly grew up on the family's estates in County Wexford which had been granted to his grandfather Solomon Richards during the Cromwellian era. He had two brothers Michael Richards and John Richards who also pursued army careers. A sister, Elizabeth, married the politician James Craggs. The family were Protestants, although John converted to Catholicism.

== Siege of Buda ==
Having apparently been part of the Tangier Garrison, Richards joined the English ordnance during the 1680s. In order to improve his knowledge of artillery he was sent in 1685 to Vienna to serve with the Imperial forces then taking part in the Great Turkish War. As a staff officer to General Taffe, he saw action at the Siege of Buda in 1686.

He returned to England and was sent to Hull to supervise the defence of the River Humber against potential foreign invasion. During the Glorious Revolution of 1688 he was part of James II's Army that assembled on Salisbury Plain, but switched his support to William of Orange.

== Ireland ==
In 1689 Richards accompanied General Percy Kirke's expedition to relieve Derry which was then being besieged by the Jacobite Irish Army of James II. He served at the successful siege of Carrickfergus and was present at the Battle of the Boyne the following year. He served under Marlborough during the capture of Cork. In 1691 he fought at the Battle of Aughrim and took part in the final Siege of Limerick which ended the war in Ireland.

== Flanders ==
In 1692 Allied troops were shifted from Ireland to Flanders to join the coalition forces fighting against Louis XIV. Jacob and his brother Michael served in the Allied artillery train at the hard-fought Battle of Steenkirk and then at the Battle of Landen the following year.

== Later career ==
In 1695 he accompanied a British raiding expedition on the French coast which launched an attack on St. Malo. Following the Peace of Ryswick in 1697 he was appointed Third Engineer of Great Britain. The following year he was promoted to colonel, and the first peacetime ordnance unit was formed and placed under his command.

However, he left to take up service in the Army of the Republic of Venice and served in Greece. He then entered the service of the Elector of Saxony. He died shortly afterwards, according to his brother John, from alcoholism.

== Bibliography ==
- Childs, John. The Williamite War in Ireland, 1688–1691. Continuum, 2007.
- Hugill, J.A.C. No Peace Without Spain. Kensal Press, 1991.
- Lee, Sidney. Dictionary of National Biography. 1886.
- Manning, Roger B. Origins of the British Army 1585–1702. Oxford University Press, 2006.
- Ostwald, Jamel. Vauban Under Siege: Engineering Efficiency and Martial Vigor in the War of the Spanish Succession. Brill, 2007.
