= Ballyraine =

District of Letterkenny, County Donegal, Ireland

Ballyraine Baile Raithin
- Town
- Location in Ireland
- Coordinates: 54°57′24″N 7°43′13″W
- Country: Ireland
- Province: Ulster
- County: County Donegal

Government
  - Dáil Éireann: Donegal
- Elevation: 52 m (171 ft)

Population (2006)
  - Rural: 2,350
- Time zone: UTC+0 (WET)
  - Summer (DST): UTC-1 (IST (WEST))
- Area codes: 074, +000 353 74
- Irish Grid Reference: C167119

Ballyraine (Irish: Baile Raithin) is a district of Letterkenny, County Donegal, Ireland, located in the parish of Aughaninshin. Ballyraine Linear Park is found here. Ballyraine National School, a co-educational primary school which is under joint management of the Church of Ireland and Presbyterian Church, is also located in the area.

Physical distance from the town centre, lack of permeability and lack of neighbourhood facilities result in an isolated neighbourhood with high dependency on car usage for daily conveniences. Residents regard the area as dangerous to children.

== History ==
Imported coal being loaded onto a lorry at Port Ballyraine, 1938

The area has a rich maritime past. In 1824, when the first description of Letterkenny as a modern town was written, it was stated that: "Within half a mile is the Port of Ballyraine, whither vessels of 100 tons bring iron, salt and colonial produce and whence they export hides and butter".

Port Ballyraine would have seen the regular importation of timber to the building trade and also the poles to carry out the Electrification of Rural Ireland programme during the 1930s. The port was closed to commercial shipping in the 1960s. The 19th-century shipping warehouses were demolished in 2001, a coal yard remains at the Port Bridge. The Polestar monument located on the Port Bridge Roundabout serves as a reminder of the area's past. Created by Locky Morris, Its shape alludes to the outline of a boat, as well as having a locomotive (train track) theme, to commemorate the fact that both forms of transportation played a major part in the town's development in the past.

In 1990, due to the growing population of the area, it was deemed necessary to construct a church. The Church of the Irish Martyrs was completed in 1994 and became the first church in Ireland to be named after the Irish Catholic Martyrs.

== Amenities ==
Children attend the Robertson School.

== Local economy ==
Businesses currently operating in the area include Donegal Creameries, which has operations in Ireland, Britain and Holland, leisure complex Arena 7 which is located in Ballyraine Retail Park and the Mount Errigal Hotel. The Donegal studio of RTÉ is located in the Donegal Enterprise Fund Business Centre in Ballyraine. Confectionery manufacturers Oatfield are based at the entrance to Ballyraine. Happy Days shop, Keys shop & Garage/Petrol Station, Sweeney's shop & Petrol Station, Ballyraine Park Health Centre (GP), Ballyraine Pharmacy, the SOLAS(formerly FAS)Training Centre, and Education and training centre Rossan College are also located in the area.

Former industries included a UNIFI plant which closed in 2004.

== Sport ==
Ballyraine F.C., founded in 1979, is the local soccer club.
