= Jacob Richards (soldier) =

Irish soldier

Jacob Richards was an Irish soldier of the seventeenth century known for his service with the English Army. In the War of the Two Kings in Ireland he fought for William III against the Jacobite Irish Army of James II. During the campaign he was chief engineer with charge of the Royal Artillery.

== Background ==
He was an Irish Protestant raised partly on his father's estates in County Wexford. His father Solomon Richards had served in the New Model Army under Oliver Cromwell.

== Campaigns ==
In 1689 he was sent to Londonderry, which was under siege at the time to study the feasibility of relieving the city by sea. In 1689 he oversaw the artillery bombardment during the Siege of Carrickfergus, where he was wounded three times. He was apparently present at the Battle of the Boyne in 1690. At the second, decisive Siege of Limerick the next year his action was decisive in the taking of Castle Connell, north-east of Limerick.

In 1692, following the Treaty of Limerick, which ended the Irish War, much of his force was redeployed to Flanders where William was leading an Allied Army against the French. His sons Jacob and Michael both oversaw the Artillery during the battles of Steenkirk and Landen and went some way to establishing the traditions of the Royal Artillery.

== Family ==
He had three sons, all of whom pursued military careers. The eldest, also called Jacob, served as part of the Tangier Garrison and later with William of Orange in Flanders. He died in 1701. The second son John Richards converted to Catholicism. This led him to serve abroad in the Austrian Army. In 1703 during the War of the Spanish Succession he was commissioned into the Portuguese Army allied to Britain. He was killed at the Siege of Alicante in 1709. The youngest Michael Richards was appointed Chief Engineer of Great Britain in 1711.

His daughter Elizabeth married the English politician James Craggs.

== Notes and references ==
- Childs, John (2007), The Williamite Wars in Ireland 1688 - 1691, London: Hambledon Continuum Press, ISBN 978-1-85285-573-4
- Hugill, J.A.C. No Peace Without Spain. Kensal Press, 1991.
