= Peter O'Higgins =

Irish Dominican priest beatified in 1992

Blessed Peter O'Higgins OP
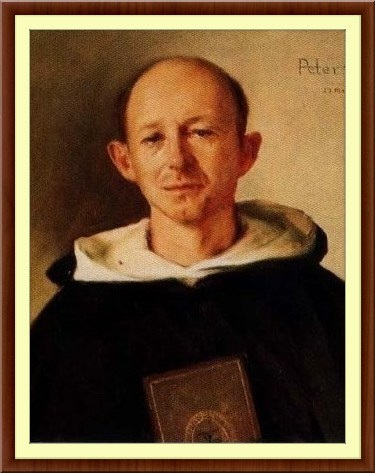
- Born: c.1602 The Pale, Kingdom of Ireland
- Died: 24 March 1642; St Stephen's Green, County Dublin, Ireland
- Cause of death: Death by hanging
- Venerated in: Catholic Church in Ireland; Order of Preachers
- Beatified: 22 September 1992 by Pope John Paul II
- Major shrine: St Saviour's Priory, Dublin
- Feast: 23 March (Dublin Archdiocese); 20 June (All Ireland as one of the Irish Catholic Martyrs); 30 October (with Terence O'Brien in the Dominican Ordo)

Blessed Peter O'Higgins O.P, in Irish Peadar Ó Huiggin, (c.1602 The Pale, Kingdom of Ireland – 24 March 1642, St Stephen's Green, County Dublin, Ireland) was an Irish Dominican priest who was hanged outside the walls of Dublin, officially for high treason against King Charles I but in reality as part of the religious persecution of the Catholic Church in Ireland. O'Higgins was Beatified by Pope John Paul II on 22 September 1992 as one of the 24 officially recognized Irish Catholic Martyrs.

== Early life ==
O'Higgins is believed to have been born at Tipper, near Naas, County Kildare. According to John Punch, O'Higgins said before his death, "In this city and in the country around it, where the King's writ is said to run, I have always lived."

He was educated secretly in Ireland and later in Spain. He may have been ordained at Lisbon on 21 December 1624 and he appears in a list of Irish Dominicans resident in the Spanish Empire as of 1627.

With the accession of King Charles I in 1625, a limited religious toleration was granted. Thomas Wentworth, the Lord Deputy of Ireland, wrote in a letter of November 1646, "It is too much to distemper [the Irish], by bringing plantations upon them and disturbing them in the exercise of their religion, so long as it is without scandal."

By 1635, O'Higgins had returned to Dublin and was engaged in re-opening the Dominican priory in Naas, with the covert support of the same Lord Deputy, who was building Jigginstown Castle nearby.

Believing that religious persecution was finally at an end, the Old English Catholics of Dublin and The Pale ejected all Church of Ireland clergy from the Pre-Reformation St Patrick's Cathedral, which was then reconsecrated, followed by a Solemn High Mass. According to the Venetian Ambassador, Catholics in the rest of the British Isles were terrified by this move, as they feared, correctly, that it would make the religious persecution of Catholics worse rather than better.

On 12 May 1641, Wentworth, who had been recalled to England and had been condemned by the Puritan-controlled House of Commons, was executed upon Tower Hill for, among many other things, having covertly granted religious toleration to the Catholic priests, religious, and laity living on his estate at Naas.

== The rising of 1641 ==
During the Irish Rebellion of 1641, Rev. Dr. William Pilsworth, Church of Ireland Vicar of Donadea, was arrested by rebel soldiers and was about to be hanged, when O'Higgins stepped forward to protect him. Pilsworth later deposed about:

"...a great number of Barberous rouges [rogues] thirstinge for our innocent bloud, heere when they could finde nothinge worthey of death ffitz Gerald of Ballisonan beinge Cheife asked mee whither I would vppon savinge my life goe with them to Mass, I answered I would not save the boddy to destroy the soule whervppon ffitz Gerald of Blackhale swore a great oath that I should hang; and truly I hadd there vndoubtedly suffered hadd not god shewed his wonted wonderfull deliverance, for beinge on the gallows and they revilingly sayinge preach there: a preist whom I never saw before made a Longe speech in my behalfe saynge that my father whoe lived for longe amongst them did not deserve his Child should bee soe miserably vsed and that this & the like blouddye vnhumane acts was it that did and would in a greater measure draw gods vengeance on them; and in that place cursed those that would have a hand in my bloud whervppon I was brought downe..."

On 1 February 1642 the Royal Army skirmished with the Kildare rebels who were based at Newcastle, and went on to take Naas. In the process O'Higgins was arrested, as described by a royalist Philip Bysse:

"...there were taken at Naas one father Higgin, a prior there, and Thomas and Walter Ashe, of that Towne, these all were brought to Dublin..."

A terrified O'Higgins accordingly sought the protection of the Marquess of Ormond, who ordered him delivered to Dublin under the protection of Royalist cavalry. The fury of Protestant Royalist soldiers towards all Catholics and especially priests, however, was so intense that Ormonde's cavalry, under the command of Colonel Sir Thomas Armstrong, had to fight a pitched battle against Ormonde's infantrymen, who were incited by Sir Charles Coote to demand in vain that O'Higgins be surrendered to him. Despite the cavalry's victory and further efforts by Ormonde to protect him, O'Higgins fell into the hands of Coote.

Upon his arrival in Dublin on 3 February, O'Higgins was imprisoned in Dublin Castle under terrible conditions. Seeking to save his life, Ormonde gathered many petitions, of which at least twenty still survive, from Protestants relating how O'Higgins had saved their lives from sectarian violence and imploring that his life be spared in return. By 13 February, Coote had arranged for the testimony of a witness who alleged that O'Higgins had called for massacres of Protestants, and on 27 April Higgins was outlawed for high treason. The weakness of the evidence was such, that O'Higgins was not charged with a crime and was instead sentenced to death by hanging under martial law.

== Death ==
On the eve of his execution, O'Higgins was offered by Coote his life, a full pardon for high treason, and high preferment in the State-controlled Church of Ireland if he would renounce the Catholic faith. O'Higgins insisted that he would do so only if these verbal promises were first committed to a written and signed document.

On 24 March 1642, a great crowd gathered around the gallows in St Stephen's Green, then outside the walls of Dublin, expecting to see a Catholic priest renounce the Catholic religion. But when Coote's full pardon was given to him, O'Higgins instead announced to the crowd, "The sole reason why I am condemned to death to-day is that I profess the Catholic religion. Here is an authentic proof of my innocence: the autograph letter of the Viceroy offering me very rich rewards and my life if I abandon the Catholic religion. I call God and man to witness that I firmly and unhesitatingly reject these offers and willingly and gladly I enter into this conflict, professing that Faith. I die a Catholic and a Dominican priest. I forgive from my heart all who have conspired to bring about my death." Among the crowd at the foot of the scaffold was William Pilsworth who shouted out: "This man is innocent! This man is innocent! He saved my life!" His words fell on deaf ears. With the words "Deo Gratias" on his lips Peter O'Higgins was hanged and died upon the gallows.

Following his martyrdom, local Recusants attempted to bury O'Higgins in the Dominican cemetery attached to St Saviour's Priory, located on the north side of the River Liffey where the Four Courts now stands. The burial was interrupted, however, by Royalist soldiers, who desecrated O'Higgins's body, which was then buried outside the city walls of Dublin.

== Legacy ==
It has been alleged that the main reason for O'Higgins' execution without a formal trial was that a synod at Kells, County Meath chaired by Archbishop Hugh O'Reilly had recently announced, "That, whereas the Catholics of Ireland have taken up arms in defense of their religion, for the preservation of the King, already threatened with destruction by the Puritans, as likewise for the security of their own lives, possessions, and liberty; we, on the part of the Catholics, declare these proceedings to be most just and lawful. Nevertheless, if, in the pursuit of these objects, any person or persons should be actuated by motives if avarice, malice, or revenge, we declare such persons to be guilty of a grievous offense, and deservedly subject to the censures of the Church, unless upon advice they change their intentions and pursue a different course." O'Higgins believed otherwise and claimed before his death that Sir Charles Coote's signed pardon proved that his imprisonment, trial before a drumhead court-martial, and death sentence were motivated solely in odium fidei ("out of hatred of the Faith").

According to Augustine Valkenberg, "Early in the morning of 23 March 1642, one of Ormonde's kinsmen brought him the information that he had seen the body of Peter Higgins hanging on a scaffold. Ormonde taxed the Lord's Justices with his death. They blamed Coote, saying that he had hanged Higgins without their knowledge, but when Ormonde demanded that he be brought to task for his crime, they refused."

Despite his efforts to save O'Higgins' life, the latter's execution along with those of many other priests was a major factor in the reluctance and often outright unwillingness of Catholic Royalists to trust or join forces with Ormonde, even a few years later when they faced a common enemy.

O'Higgins' life and death was carefully investigated and publicized by the Dominican Order and other Irish refugees throughout Catholic Europe, particularly through the written accounts by Anthony Bruodin and John Punch. When interest in the Irish Catholic Martyrs was revived following Catholic Emancipation in 1829, the name of Peter O'Higgins was firmly established on the list.The evidence was examined in an Ordinary Process held in Dublin in 1904 and submitted to the Holy See. In February 1915, Pope Benedict XV authorized the introduction of O'Higgins cause for Catholic sainthood, which was examined further in the Apostolic Process held at Dublin between 1917 and 1930, upon which the results were again submitted to the Holy See.

On 27 September 1992, Peter O'Higgins and 16 other Irish Catholic Martyrs were Beatified in Rome by Pope John Paul II. June 20 was assigned as their feast day.
