= Michael Richards (British Army officer) =

Anglo-Irish army officer and military engineer

Brigadier-General Michael Richards
- Born: 1673; Ireland
- Died: 5 February 1721 (aged 47–48)

Brigadier-General Michael Richards (1673 – 5 February 1721) was an Anglo-Irish army officer and military engineer who served as Chief Engineer of Great Britain and Surveyor-General of the Ordnance. Born in Ireland in 1673 into an Anglo-Irish family, he was the son of the military engineer Jacob Richards and the grandson of Solomon Richards. The family were Irish Protestants who owned land in County Wexford. His elder brothers Jacob and John both pursued military careers. Richards was commissioned into the English Army in 1692 (although he may have seen earlier service in the Williamite War in Ireland) and served in Flanders in the Nine Years War. He accompanied an expedition to Newfoundland in 1697. Richards played a role in rebuilding the town of St. John's which had been destroyed in a French attack.

In 1711, he was appointed as Chief Engineer of Great Britain, a position that had gone unfilled since the death of Sir Martin Beckman in 1702. On the reappointment of John Churchill, 1st Duke of Marlborough as Master-General of the Ordnance in 1714, his protégé Richards was made Surveyor-General of the Ordnance. Richards moved to Charlton Grove, a hilltop house in Charlton, with a view to the Royal Arsenal in Woolwich. Here, he oversaw the building of the Royal Brass Foundry (1716–17). This Grade I listed building has been attributed to both Sir John Vanbrugh and Nicholas Hawksmoor, but may have been designed by Richards himself. Richards retired from the British Army at the rank of brigadier general and died on 5 February 1721. His marble tomb with an effigy in full armour is in St Luke's Church in Charlton, London.

== Bibliography ==
- Napier, Gerald (2005): Follow the Sapper: An Illustrated History of the Corps of Royal Engineers. Institution of Royal Engineers. ISBN 0903530260
- Ostwald, Jamel (2007): Vauban Under Siege: Engineering Efficiency and Martial Vigor in the War of the Spanish Succession. BRILL. ISBN 9004154892
- Saint, A., Guillery, P. (eds.) (2012): Woolwich - Survey of London, Volume 48, Yale Books, London. ISBN 9780300187229 (online text)
