= James Craggs =

James Craggs may refer to:

- James Craggs the Elder (1657–1721), English politician
- James Craggs the Younger (1686–1721), English politician, son of the above
