= Muiris Mac Ionrachtaigh =

Irish Roman Catholic priest and martyr

- Born: Kilmallock, County Limerick, Ireland
- Died: 30 April 1585; Clonmel, County Tipperary, Ireland
- Other name: Maurice MacKenraghty
- Occupation: Roman Catholic priest

Muiris Mac Ionrachtaigh, anglicised as Maurice MacKenraghty (Note: Surname in Irish Mac Ionrachtaigh; Latinised as Makenrachtus; anglicised as Hanratty, Enright, Kenraghty, MacEnraghty; Kimracha, Kinrechtin) (died 30 April 1585), was an Irish Roman Catholic priest who was put to death, officially for high treason, but in reality as part of the religious persecution of the Catholic Church in Ireland by Queen Elizabeth I and her officials. He was beatified by Pope John Paul II, along with 16 other Irish Catholic Martyrs, on 27 September 1992.

== Life ==
Although the exact date of his birth remains unknown, Muiris Mac Ionrachtaigh, was born at Kilmallock (Irish: Cill Mocheallóg), which was "a prosperous walled town in the Desmond lands in County Limerick". His father, Tomás Mac Ionrachtaigh ("Thomas MacKenraghty"), was a goldsmith and silversmith who was originally from the civil barony of Irraghticonnor. The MacKenraghty family were full citizens of the town of Kilmallock and probably also enjoyed the patronage of the Earl of Desmond.

Mac Ionrachtaigh embraced the ecclesiastical state and is believed to have studied abroad in Catholic Europe and to have graduated bachelor in theology. Returning to Ireland, he became chaplain and confessor to Gerald FitzGerald, 15th Earl of Desmond, and shared the fortunes of his patron in the Second Desmond Rebellion against Queen Elizabeth I. During the uprising, Mac Ionrachtaigh continued his priestly ministry to the best of his ability and is said to have suffered immensely during the Earl of Ormond's retaliatory campaign of scorched earth and total war that triggered a State-imposed famine which killed an estimated third of Munster's population.

On 17 September 1583, while a fugitive with the Earl, Mac Ionrachtaigh was surprised on Sliabh Luachra by Maurice Roche, 6th Viscount Fermoy's gallowglass. On 19 September, Lord Roche wrote to the Earl of Ormond that the Rebel Earl's chaplain was in his hands.

In a letter dispatched on 23 September 1583 from Ormonde Castle at Carrick-on-Suir to Lord Burghley, the Earl of Ormond announced that he had dispatched a Captain Roberts to bring in the captive priest. Ormond added that he had also sent his servant, Patrick Grant, to whom the priest was chained, "that no man may see him, nor speak with him, till he comes hither to me... I would this chaplain, and I, were for one hour with you in your chamber, that you may know the secrets of his heart, which by fair or foul means, he must open to me."

While no records of any such interrogation survives, Mac Ionrachtaigh was imprisoned at Clonmel Gaol. According to the Tipperary Museum of Hidden History, the earliest records of a Clonmel city gaol date from 1650 and refer to a small building located around what is now O'Connell Street. According to the Museum, "Prisons were run by private individuals. Gaolers had no concern for the physical or moral well being of their prisoners. Those who could afford it, could pay the gaoler in order to buy themselves some comforts while imprisoned such as private rooms, family visits, food and even drink. Overcrowding, disease and escapes were common."

According to historian James Coombes, "Here, as in other southern towns, Counter-Reformation Catholicism was already beginning to make a real impact; and, as in these other towns, the citizens of Clonmel were beginning to come up against the problem of combining loyalty to the Pope with loyalty to the Queen. Maurice MacKenraghty continued his ministry during what proved to be a long imprisonment."

In April 1585, his jailer was then bribed by Victor White, a leading Old English Clonmel townsman and Recusant, to release the priest for one night to say Mass and administer Communion inside White's own house on Easter Sunday (11 April 1585). Permission was granted and Mac Ionrachtaigh spent the whole night hearing Confessions.

The jailer, however, had secretly tipped off the Lord President of Munster Sir John Norris, who had just arrived at Clonmel. According to historian James Coombes, "Norris arranged to have White's house surrounded by soldiers and raided. The raiding party entered it shortly before Mass was due to begin and naturally caused great panic. Some people tried to hide in the basement; others jumped through the windows; one woman broke her arm in an attempt to escape. The priest hid in a heap of straw and was wounded in the thigh by the probing sword of a soldier. Despite the pain, he remained silent and later escaped. The soldiers dismantled the altar and seized the sacred vessels."

== Trial and martyrdom ==
Meanwhile, Victor White was arrested and threatened with execution unless he revealed where Muiris Mac Ionrachtaigh could be arrested. Upon hearing of the situation, Mac Ionrachtaigh sent an emissary to speak to White. Despite White's pleas that he preferred to lose his own life rather than have Mac Ionrachtaigh come to harm, the priest insisted upon giving himself up and was again thrown into Clonmel Gaol.

The "trial" of Mac Ionrachtaigh by martial law involved merely an interrogation before Sir John Norris and his assistants. Pardon and high preferment were offered for conforming to the Church of Ireland and taking the Oath of Supremacy to accept the subservience of the Church to the State. Mac Ionrachtaigh, however, resolutely maintained the Roman Catholic faith and the Petrine Primacy and was according condemned by Sir John Norris, "after much invective", to death for high treason. After passing sentence, however, Norris offered Mac Ionrachtaigh a full pardon in return for taking the Oath of Supremacy and naming those local Catholics who had attended his Mass or secretly received the Sacraments from him. A Protestant minister also attempted to convert the priest by engaging him in debate. All was in vain, and Mac Ionrachtaigh refused to conform. According to historian James Coombes, "Especially in trials by martial law, there was no fixed procedure or sequence of events. What is made perfectly clear is that Maurice MacKenraghty was condemned to death because he would not take the Oath of Supremacy."

According to the Tipperary Museum of Hidden History, "Executions were held in public at the Gallows, (hence place names such as Gallows Hill), until 1868. It was thought that such public displays on busy days like Market Day, would act as a deterrent to would be criminals."

On 30 April 1585, Muiris Mac Ionrachtaigh was dragged behind the tail of a horse to be executed as a traitor. According to Bishop David Rothe, "When he came to the place of execution, he turned to the people and addressed them some pious words as far as time allowed; in the end he asked all Catholics to pray for him and he gave them his blessing."

He was hanged, cut down while still alive, and then executed by beheading. His head was displayed spiked in the market-place along with the four quarters of his torso. All were, however, later purchased from the soldiers and buried behind the former high altar of the ruined Franciscan friary. Writing in 1907, however, W.P. Burke alleged, without citing his source, that Mac Ionrachtaigh's body had been re-exhumed in 1647 and reburied alongside the tombs of the FitzGerald dynasty at Askeaton Friary in County Limerick.

== Legacy ==
According to historian James Coombes, the former location of Victor White's house near Lough Street in Clonmel continued to be nicknamed "Martyr Lane" until well into Cromwellian times.

During an 1807 visit to Ireland on behalf of the London Hibernian Society, Welsh nonconformist minister Thomas Charles alleged ruefully that the Reformation in Ireland had failed because of the refusal of Protestant clergy to preach or educate in the local vernacular. Of his visit to Clonmel, Charles recalled, "All the county spoke Irish... they spoke Irish in the streets."

Muiris Mac Ionrachtaigh was beatified by Pope John Paul II, along with 16 other Irish Catholic Martyrs, on 27 September 1992.
