= William Tirry =

Irish Roman Catholic priest and martyr

Blessed William Tirry (Irish: Liam Tuiridh) OSA
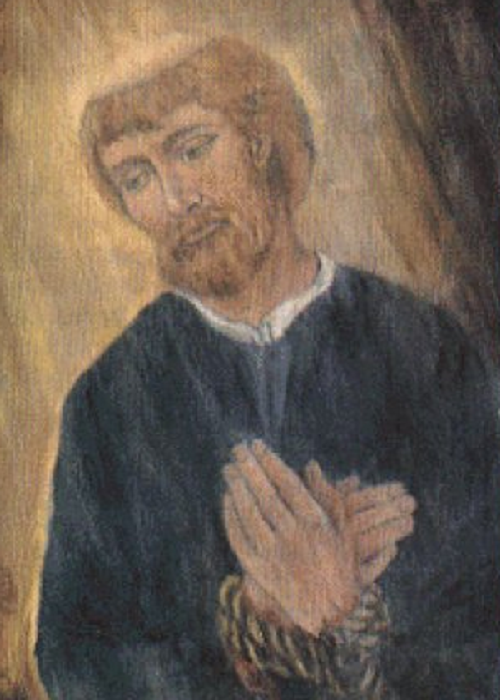

Martyr
- Born: c. 1609; Cork, Ireland
- Died: 12 May 1654 (aged 44 – 45); Clonmel, Ireland
- Venerated in: Roman Catholic Church
- Beatified: 27 September 1992 by Pope John Paul II
- Feast: 12 May

William Tirry (Irish: Liam Tuiridh) OSA (1609 – 12 May 1654) was an Irish Roman Catholic priest of the Order of Saint Augustine following the Cromwellian conquest of Ireland. He was captured by the priest hunters at Fethard, County Tipperary while continuing his priestly ministry covertly and was hanged at Clonmel, officially for high treason against the Commonwealth of England, but in reality as part of The Protectorate's systematic religious persecution of the Catholic Church in Ireland. Pope John Paul II beatified Friar William Tirry as one of the 24 officially recognized Irish Catholic Martyrs in 1992.

== Early life ==
Tirry was born into a well-to-do family of Hiberno-Norman merchants in Cork, Ireland in 1608, the son of Robert and Joan Tirry. He was named after his uncle, the elder William Tirry, Bishop of Cork and Cloyne. Tirry was the grandson of Edmond Terry, or Tirry, Lord Mayor of Cork, and his wife Catherine Galway. His aunt Joan married Dominick Sarsfield, 1st Viscount Sarsfield, the Chief Justice of the Irish Common Pleas: their son William, the 2nd Viscount, played an important role in Tirry's life as his patron and protector.

Well-educated, he learned Ecclesiastical Latin and Koine Greek, but also spoke the Classical Gaelic literary language and the Munster Irish vernacular. At the age of eighteen, he left to study for the priesthood in Catholic Europe. He is known to have studied for the priesthood first at the Irish College in Valladolid and then at the Collège des Grand Augustins in Paris, and that he was ordained around 1634. He and then spent five years (1636–1641) in Brussels, Belgium.

After his return to Ireland, he joined the Augustinian Order at St. Austin's Abbey in Cork City. He then spent about four months working as secretary to his uncle, Bishop William Tirry. Although he relinquished this post to return to St Austin's Abbey, he was then persuaded to act as chaplain to his cousin Lord Kilmallock and as tutor to the latter's son and heir.

== Ministry ==
Tirry was elected Provincial Secretary in 1646. Lord Sarsfield of Kilmallock's death in 1648 deprived Tirry of his chief protector. In 1649, he was chosen as prior of the Augustinian convent in Skreen, County Mayo, but was unable to assume his duties there because of the beginning of the Cromwellian conquest of Ireland. A law was enacted on 6 January 1653 declaring that any Roman Catholic priest in Ireland was guilty of high treason. Tirry was accordingly forced into hiding like all other priests.

All sources are agreed that for three years prior to his capture, Friar William Tirry found shelter with his distant cousin, a local Old English noblewoman and elderly widow named Mrs. Amy Everard, at Fethard, County Tipperary. Aside from acting as Mrs. Everard's son's tutor and continuing his covert priestly ministry, "to all who came seeking the sacraments", Friar William spent most of his time in secret prayer and acts of penance.

== Imprisonment and Execution ==
Fr. William Tirry was arrested at Fethard while vested for Mass on Holy Saturday, 25 March, 1654. Both priestly vestments and samizdat writings in defense of the Catholic Faith were also confiscated during his arrest. To the fury of the judges, one of the discoveries at Tirry's arrest was, "a manuscript work composed by him discrediting Protestantism". Fr. Tirry was taken to Clonmel Gaol and held there pending trial. Three men had reported his whereabouts to the priest hunters in return for the £5 bounty.

According to the Tipperary Museum of Hidden History, the earliest records of a Clonmel city gaol date from 1650 and refer to a small building located around what is now O'Connell Street. According to the Museum, "Prisons were run by private individuals. Gaolers had no concern for the physical or moral well being of their prisoners. Those who could afford it, could pay the gaoler in order to buy themselves some comforts while imprisoned such as private rooms, family visits, food and even drink. Overcrowding, disease and escapes were common."

On 26 April, he was tried by a jury and a panel of Commonwealth judges, including New Model Army Colonel Solomon Richards, for violating the Proclamation of 6 January 1653, which defined it as high treason against the Commonwealth of England for priests to remain in Great Britain or Ireland. Like all other British subjects tried for the same offence prior to the Treason Act 1695, William Tirry and his codefendant, Capuchin Friar Matthew Fogarty, were forbidden the services of a defence counsel and were forced to act as their own attorneys.

In his own defense, Fr. Tirry replied that while he viewed the Commonwealth as the lawful government, he had no choice but to disobey its laws, as both the Pope and his Augustinian superiors had ordered him to remain in Ireland and to continue his pastoral ministry covertly. Fr. Tirry was according found guilty and sentenced to death by hanging, which was carried out in Clonmel on 2 May 1654.

According to the Tipperary Museum of Hidden History, "Executions were held in public at the Gallows, (hence place names such as Gallows Hill), until 1868. It was thought that such public displays on busy days like Market Day, would act as a deterrent to would be criminals."

Friar Matthew Fogarty later recalled: "William, wearing his Augustinian habit, was led to the gallows praying the rosary. He blessed the crowd which had gathered, pardoned his betrayers and affirmed his faith. It was a moving moment for Catholics and Protestants alike."

Despite the efforts of a Puritan minister to silence him, Fr. Tirry told the assembled crowd, "there is only one true Church, whose head is the pope: Pope and Church are to be obeyed. He publicly forgave the three men who had betrayed him, and... stated explicitly that he had been offered life and favour, if he would renounce his religion." Fr. Tirry was then hanged, after which the crowd surged forward to soak pieces of cloth in the blood that ran from his nose, which were seen as relics of a martyr.

Friar William was then buried, with some ceremony, in the ruins of the Augustinian friary in nearby Fethard. The evidence is that he was buried in the grounds, rather than inside the ruins of the church, but it has not yet been possible to locate his grave. Friar Matthew Fogarty was later released and banished from the Commonwealth.

== Legacy ==
According to historian D.P. Conyngham, "It is impossible to estimate the number of Catholics slain the ten years from 1642 to 1652. Three Bishops and more than 300 priests were put to death for their faith. Thousands of men, women, and children were sold as slaves for the West Indies; Sir W. Petty mentions that 6,000 boys and women were thus sold. A letter written in 1656, quoted by Lingard, puts the number at 60,000; as late as 1666 there were 12,000 Irish slaves scattered among the West Indian islands. Forty thousand Irish fled to the Continent, and 20,000 took shelter in the Hebrides or other Scottish islands. In 1641, the population of Ireland was 1,466,000, of whom 1,240,000 were Catholics. In 1659 the population was reduced to 500,091, so that very nearly 1,000,000 must have perished or been driven into exile in the space of eighteen years. In comparison with the population of both periods, this was even worse than the famine extermination of our own days."

Meanwhile, Filippo Visconti, the Augustinian Prior General, was interested enough in the details of Fr. William Tirry's life and death to order the Irish Provincial, James O'Mahoney, to publish an account of Tirry's martyrdom in Sanguinea Eremus in 1655. His name drew little attention outside the Augustinian Order, however, until the revival of interest in the Irish Catholic Martyrs following Catholic Emancipation in 1829.

During an 1807 visit to Ireland on behalf of the London Hibernian Society, Welsh nonconformist minister Thomas Charles alleged ruefully that the Reformation in Ireland had failed because of the refusal of Protestant clergy to preach or educate in the local vernacular. Of his visit to Clonmel, Rev. Charles recalled, "All the county spoke Irish... they spoke Irish in the streets."

Tirry's Cause was submitted to Rome in 1904, and Pope Benedict XV authorized the introduction of his cause for Canonization in 1915.

Friar William Tirry was beatified by Pope John Paul II along with 16 other Irish Catholic Martyrs on 22 September 1992. The Augustinian order celebrates his feast day on 12 May. In a testament to the pervasive Secularisation of Ireland since the 1960s, in November 2015 Clonmel, the location of Fr. William Tirry's imprisonment, trial, and execution, also became the location of Ireland's first marriage between two men.
