= Charles MacCarthy More =

Irish Jacobite soldier

Charles MacCarthy More was an Irish Jacobite soldier of the seventeenth century known for his service during the Williamite War in Ireland.

Following the landing of Marshal Schomberg's Williamite expeditionary force at Belfast Lough in August 1689 the Jacobite commander of the area Thomas Maxwell decided to withdraw most of his soldiers southwards towards Newry. Maxwell appointed MacCarthy More to command at Carrickfergus with his own regiment, as well as elements of Colonel Cormac O'Neill's. His orders were to delay Schomberg as long as possible while the main Irish Army was readied to defend Dublin. After a week-long Siege of Carrickfergus the garrison surrendered, and were allowed to march out to Jacobite-controlled Newry with the honours of war.

The following year MacCarthy More was Governor of Youghal in County Cork. In 1691 he was active around Skibbereen.

== Bibliography ==
- Childs, John. The Williamite Wars in Ireland. Bloomsbury Publishing, 2007.
