= John Richards (soldier) =

Irish soldier

John Richards (1669–1709) was an Irish soldier and artillery commander. He served in the Portuguese Army during the War of the Spanish Succession and was killed when a mine was detonated by the enemy while in command of the defence at the Siege of Alicante.

== Early life ==
Richards was born in Ireland and grew up partly in County Wexford where his grandfather Solomon Richards had been granted lands following the Cromwellian Conquest. Although the family were Protestants, John converted to Catholicism. This prevented him from serving in the Royal Irish Army due to the penal laws, so he pursued a career in the Austrian Army. His Protestant brothers Jacob Richards and Michael Richards both joined the English Army.

== Foreign service ==
He served with the Austrians during the War of the Grand Alliance and then, following the Peace of Ryswick of 1697, he transferred along with his brother Jacob into the Venetian forces.

At the outbreak of the War of Spanish Succession, England's ally Portugal requested that London send some experienced officers to assist them. John was recommended, as he still was forbidden to serve in Queen Anne's forces due to his religion. However he was actually paid by the government in London. During the ensuing campaigns he worked closely with British forces, whose artillery train included his own brother Michael.

== Spanish campaigns ==
=== Siege of Barcelona ===
In 1705 during the Siege of Barcelona he was in overall command of the artillery batteries that successfully bombarded the city into surrender. During the siege he also accompanied the assault on the heights of Mountjuic Castle.

=== Siege of Alicante ===
Promoted to Major General, in 1707 he was appointed commander of the garrison at Alicante. This was the last remaining Allied garrison in the Valencia region. In late 1708 the town was approached by a large Franco-Spanish force. Alicante was a major objective which they wished to capture before the beginning of the next year's campaign. With no chance of immediate help, Richards improved the defences in order to resist. He abandoned the town and took shelter in the citadel. Unable to dislodge them, the enemy began constructing a vast mine. Despite his awareness of the danger, Richards repeatedly refused to surrender as he felt duty bound to continue to hold out. On 28 February 1709 the mine was sprung, killing Richards and a number of his troops. Despite his death and the damage to the defences, the garrison continued to hold out until April when they were evacuated by General James Stanhope.

== Bibliography ==
- Hugill, J.A.C. No Peace Without Spain. Kensal Press, 1991.
- Lee, Sidney. Dictionary of National Biography. 1886.
- Manning, Roger B. Origins of the British Army 1585-1702. Oxford University Press, 2006.
- Ostwald, Jamel. Vauban Under Siege: Engineering Efficiency and Martial Vigor in the War of the Spanish Succession. Brill, 2007.
