= Red Abbey, Cork =

Ruined Augustinian abbey in Cork, Ireland

Coordinates: 51.89401°N 8.47234°W

The Red Abbey
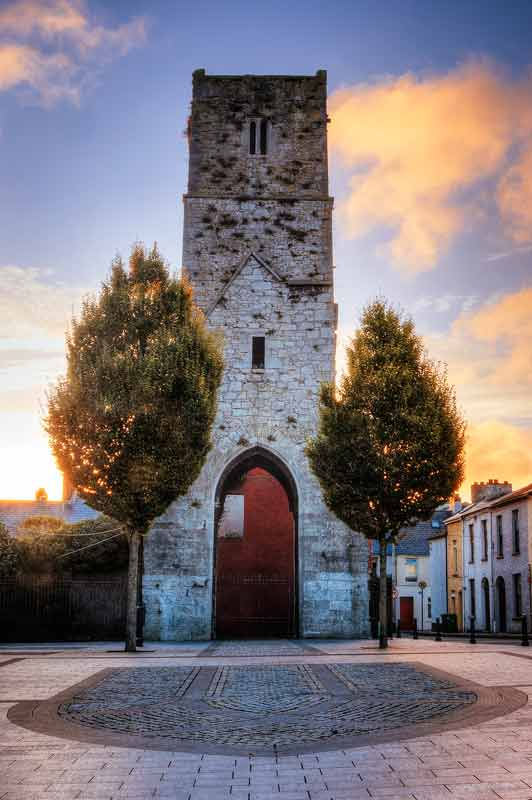
- Red Abbey tower

Monastery information
- Order: Augustinian

Architecture
- Heritage designation: Recorded monument #CO 074-041

The Red Abbey in Cork, Ireland was a 14th-century Augustinian abbey which took its name from the reddish sandstone used in construction. Today all that remains of the structure is the central bell tower of the abbey church, which is one of the last remaining visible structures dating to the medieval walled town of Cork.

== History ==
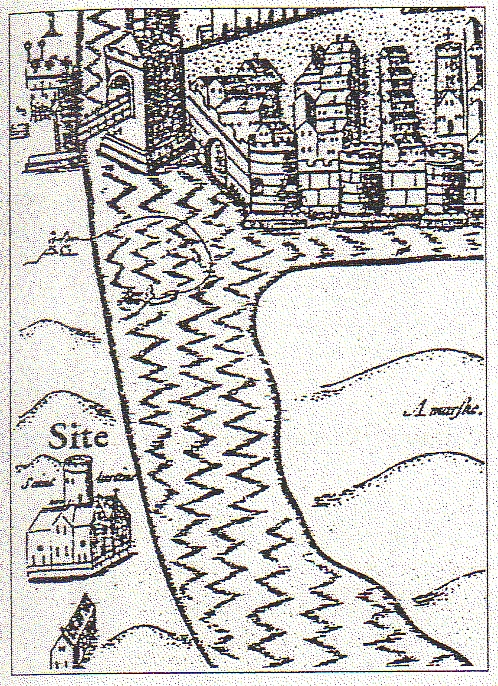
The Pacata Hibernica map of Cork (c. 1600) with a representation of the abbey ("St. Austins") in the lower left corner.

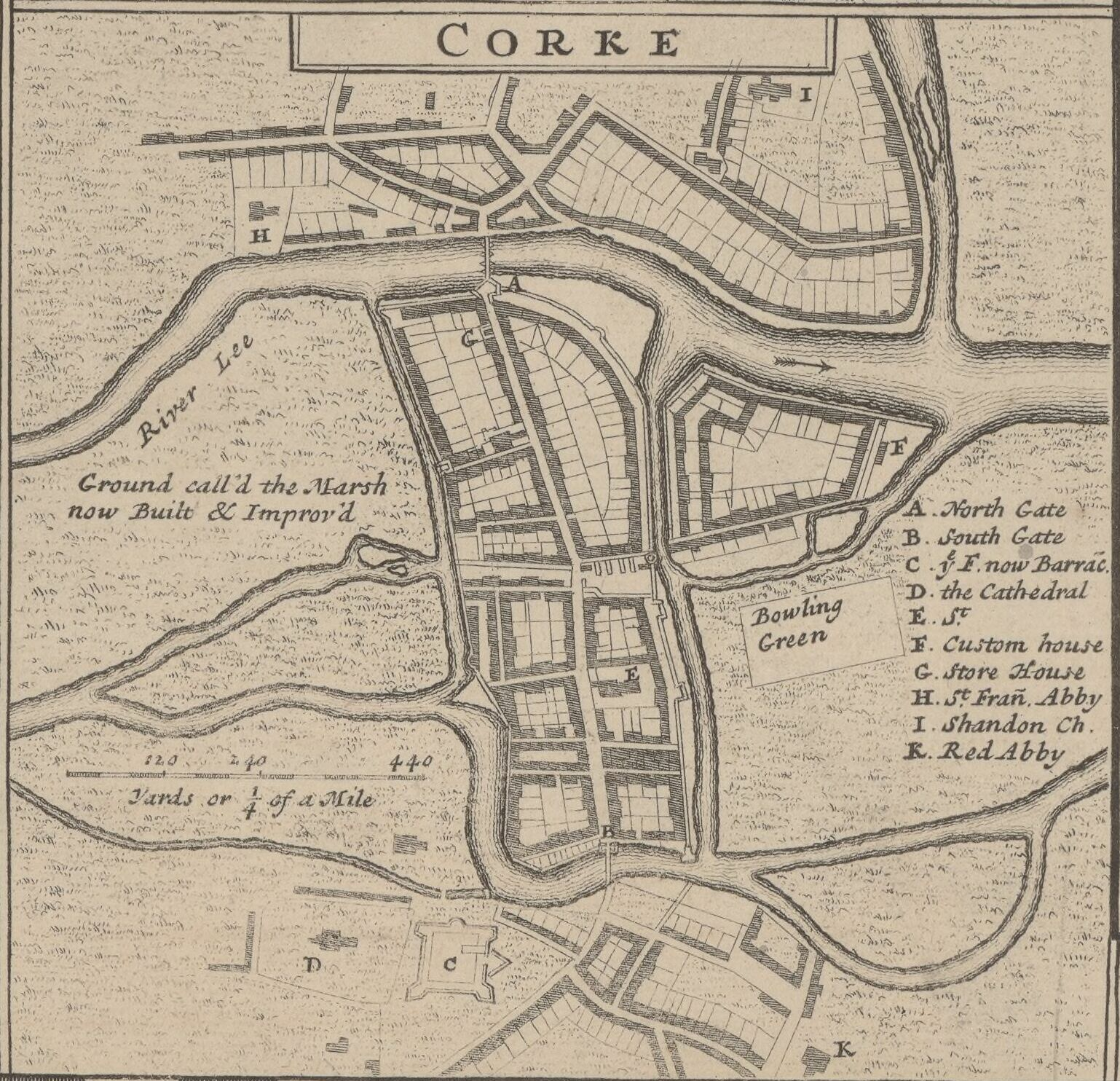
The "Red Abby" (K) on Herman Moll's early 18th-century map of Cork

The Red Abbey was built in Cork in either the late 13th or early 14th centuries, though it was definitely in existence sometime before 1306. It was founded by a member of the De Courcey family. Despite being dissolved in 1541, it was occupied by the friars until at least the rebellion of 1641, and possibly as late as 1700.

The abbey tower was used by John Churchill (later the Duke of Marlborough) as a vantage point and battery during the Siege of Cork in 1690. The siege sought to suppress an uprising in the city and its association with the expelled Catholic King of England, James II.

In the eighteenth century, the Augustinian friars established a new friary in Fishamble Lane, and the Red Abbey was turned over to use as a sugar refinery. However, a fire in the refinery destroyed much of the abbey's structure in 1799.

The remains of the monastery were excavated in 1977. Fragmented human bones, pottery spanning from medieval up to the 19th century was uncovered, along with approximately 300 pieces of lead shot. All that remains today of the structure is the bell tower of the abbey's church. The tower is designated as a national monument and maintained by Cork City Council.

== Notable people ==
- William Tirry (1609–1654), a friar of the abbey's Augustinian order who was executed following the Cromwellian conquest of Ireland and beatified in 1992 as one of the Irish Catholic Martyrs.

== See also ==
- List of abbeys and priories in Ireland (County Cork)
