= Terence O'Brien (bishop) =

Catholic bishop of Emly, Ireland & martyr (1600-1651)

Blessed Terence Albert O Brien O.P.
- Bishop of Emly
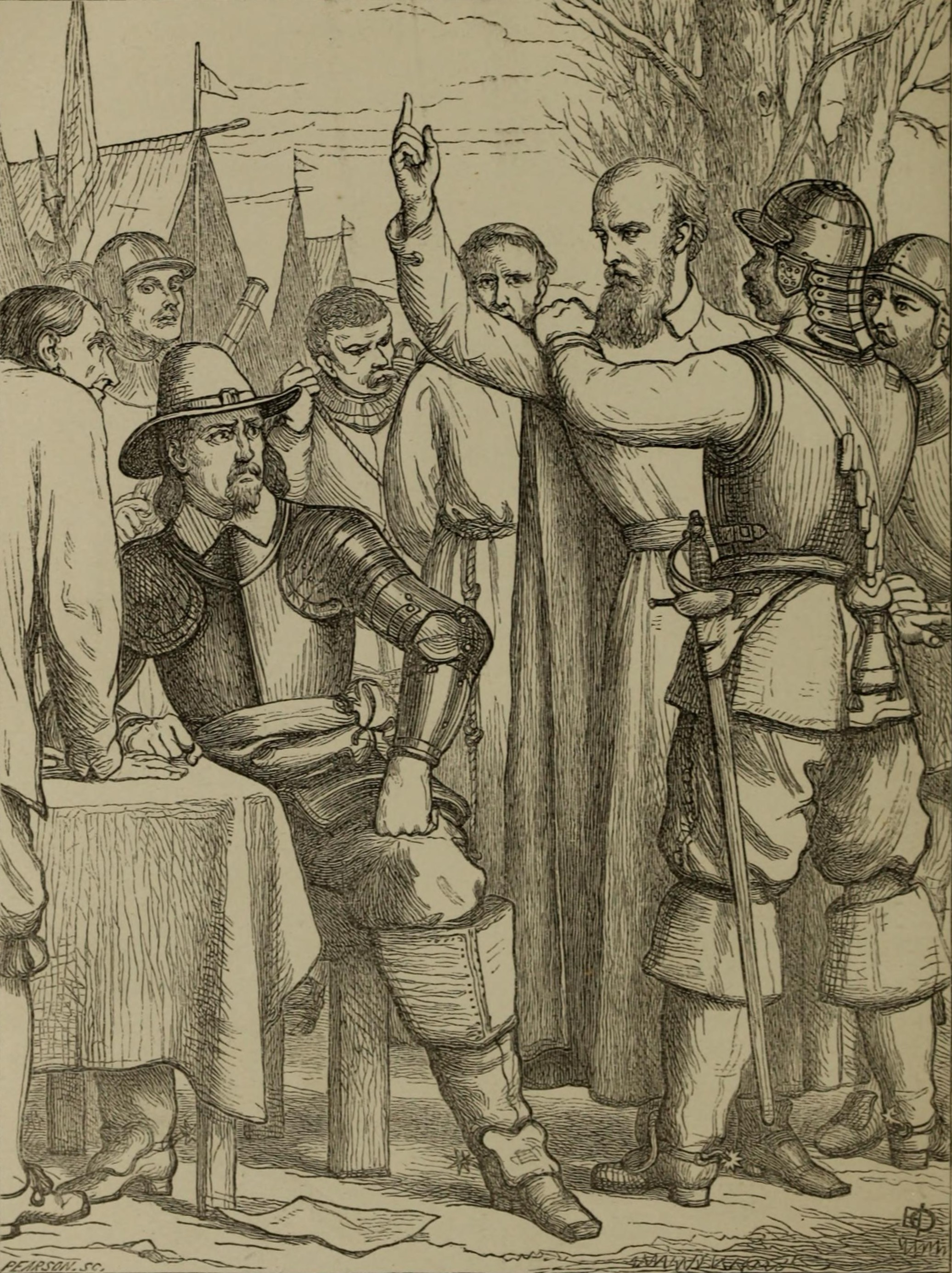
- Ireton condemning the Bishop of Limerick (illustration by H. E. Doyle, 1868)
- Diocese: Emly
- Appointed: 30 October 1651
- Term ended: 1 (O.S.)/11 (N.S.) February 1612
- Predecessor: Maurice Hurley (bishop)
- Successor: See vacant to William Burgat in 1657

Orders
- Consecration: by Nicolas de Pellevé

Personal details
- Born: c. 1600
- Died: 30 October 1651 Limerick
- Denomination: Roman Catholic

Sainthood
- Feast day: 20 June; 30 October (with Peter O'Higgins in the Dominican Ordo)
- Venerated in: 6 July 1991
- Beatified: 27 September 1992; Rome by Pope John Paul II

Terence Albert O'Brien (Irish: Muiris Ó Briain Aradh) (1600 – 30 October 1651) was an Irish priest of the Dominican Order and Roman Catholic Bishop of Emly. During the Cromwellian conquest of Ireland, he was captured by the New Model Army following the Siege of Limerick. After a drumhead court-martial, he was hanged by order of General Henry Ireton at Gallows Green, officially for advising against the surrender of the city, but in reality as part of the religious persecution of the Catholic Church in Ireland that began under Henry VIII and ended only with Catholic Emancipation in 1829. Bishop O'Brien was beatified as one of 17 Irish Catholic Martyrs by Pope John Paul II on 27 September 1992.

== Biography ==
Terence O'Brien was born into the Gaelic nobility of Ireland at Cappamore, County Limerick. Both of his parents were from the derbhfine of the last Chief of the Name of Clan O'Brien Arradh and claimed lineal descent from Brian Boru. His family still owned an estate of 2,500 Irish acres centred around Tuogh, which was later confiscated by the Commonwealth of England. He joined the Dominicans in 1621 at Limerick, where his uncle, Maurice O'Brien, was then prior. He took the name "Albert" after the Dominican scholar Albertus Magnus. In 1622 he went to study in Toledo, returning eight years later to become prior at St. Saviour's in Limerick City. In 1643 he was provincial of the Dominicans in Ireland. In 1647 he was consecrated Bishop of Emly by Giovanni Battista Rinuccini.

During the Irish Confederate Wars, like most Irish Catholics, he sided with Confederate Ireland. His services to the Catholic Confederation were highly valued by the Supreme Council. The bishop would treat the wounded and support Confederate soldiers throughout the conflict. O'Brien was against a peace treaty that did not guarantee Catholic freedom of worship in Ireland and in 1648 signed the declaration against the Confederate's truce with the Earl of Inchiquin who had committed atrocities such as the Sack of Cashel against Catholic clergy and civilians, and the declaration against the Protestant royalist leader the Duke of Ormonde in 1650 who, due to his failure to resist the Cromwellian conquest of Ireland was not deemed fit to command Catholic troops. He was one of the prelates, who, in August 1650 offered the Protectorate of Ireland to Charles IV, Duke of Lorraine.

In 1651 Limerick was besieged by the Parliamentarian New Model Army and O'Brien urged a resistance that infuriated the Ormondists and Parliamentarians. Following surrender, he was found ministering to the wounded and ill inside a temporary plague hospital. As previously decided by the besieging army, O'Brien was denied quarter and protection. Along with the alderman Thomas Stritch and the English Royalist officer Colonel Fennell, O'Brien was tried by a drumhead court-martial and sentenced to be hung by General Henry Ireton. On 30 October 1651 O'Brien was hung at Gallows Green and then posthumously beheaded. His head was subsequently displayed on a spike upon the river gate of the city.

== Legacy ==
Ireton contracted the plague raging through the city and died on 26 November. His loss reportedly "struck a great sadness into Cromwell" and he was considered a great loss to the New Model Army. There are various anecdotes about his demise from Irish ecclesiastical and English Royalist sources, by whom Ireton's death has been depicted as divine retribution for the hanging of O'Brien, who prior to his death had called upon Ireton to answer at God's judgment seat for the New Model Army's behaviour in Ireland. The Hibernica Dominicana claimed that on his death bed Ireton was "privately muttering to himself, 'I never gave the aid of my counsel towards the murder of that bishop; never, never; it was the council of war did it... I wish I had never seen this popish bishop'."

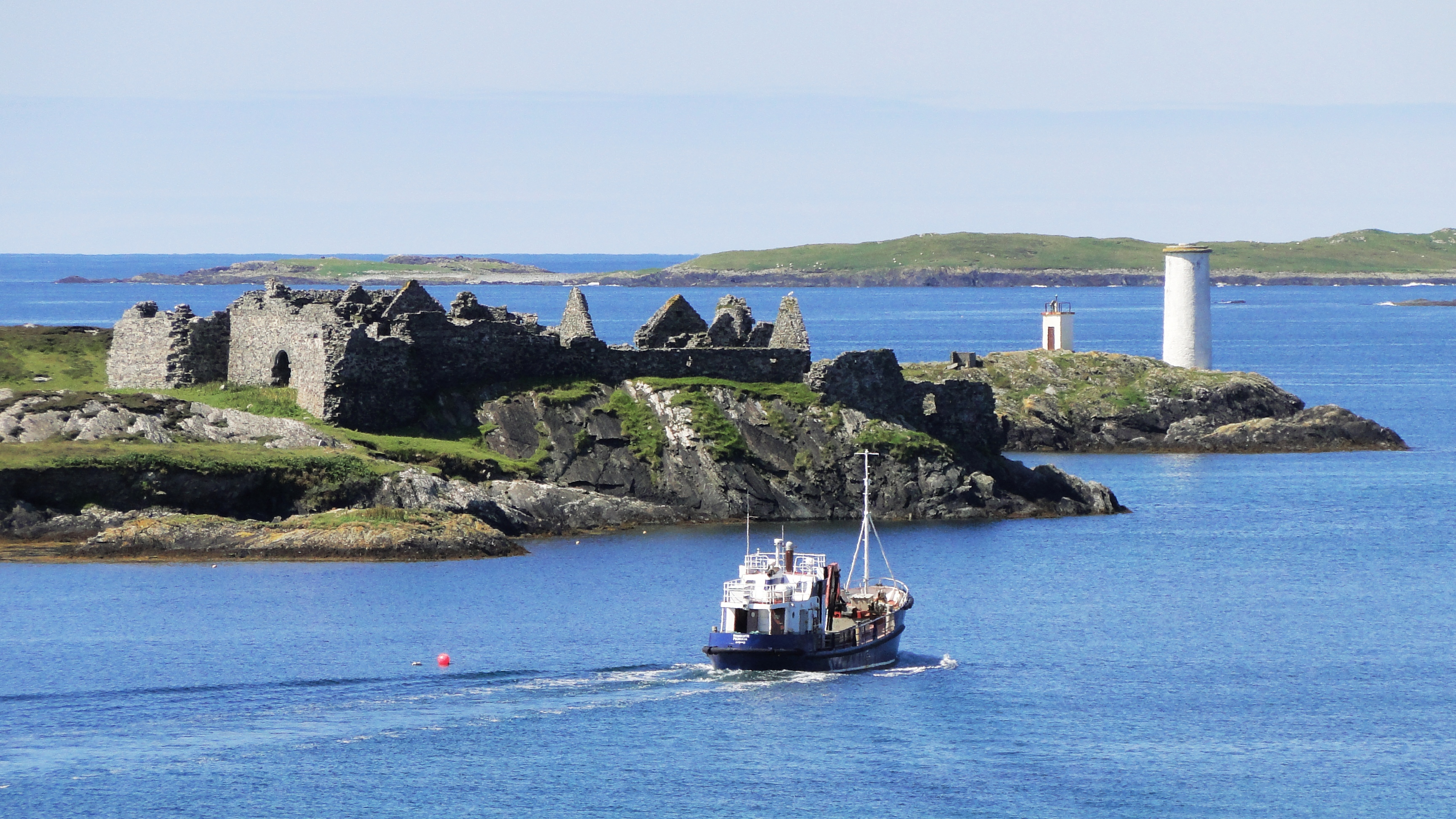
Inishbofin harbour, with Cromwell's Barracks in the background.

In a ruling that was far less popular among his own staff officers, Ireton had also sentenced the former governor of Limerick Hugh Dubh O'Neill to be hung, though General Edmund Ludlow immediately countermanded the order following Ireton's death. After taking the island in 1653, the New Model Army turned Inishbofin into a prison camp for Catholic priests arrested while exercising their religious ministry covertly in other parts of Ireland. Inishmore, in the Aran Islands, was used for exactly the same purpose. The last priests held on both islands were finally released in 1662 following the 1660 Stuart Restoration.

== Investigation and beatification ==
After the successful fight that was eventually spearheaded by Daniel O'Connell for Catholic Emancipation between 1780 and 1829, interest revived as the Catholic Church in Ireland was rebuilding after three hundred years of being strictly illegal and underground. As a result, a series of re-publications of primary sources relating to the period of the persecutions and meticulous comparisons against archival Government documents in London and Dublin from the same period were made by Daniel F. Moran and other historians.

The first Apostolic Process under Canon Law began in Dublin in 1904, after which a positio was submitted to the Holy See.

In the 12 February 1915 Apostolic decree In Hibernia, heroum nutrice, Pope Benedict XV formally authorized the formal introduction of additional Causes for Roman Catholic Sainthood.

During a further Apostolic Process held at Dublin between 1917 and 1930 and against the backdrop of the Irish War of Independence and Civil War, the evidence surrounding 260 alleged cases of Roman Catholic martyrdom were further investigated, after which the findings were again submitted to the Holy See.

On 27 September 1992, O'Brien and sixteen other Irish Catholic Martyrs were beatified by Pope John Paul II. June 20th, the anniversary of the 1584 execution of Elizabethan era martyr Dermot O'Hurley, was assigned as the feast day of all 17. A large backlighted portrait of him is on display in St. Michael's Church, Cappamore, County Limerick, which depicts him during The Siege of Limerick.

== See also ==
- Dominicans in Ireland
