= Church of the Irish Martyrs =

Catholic church in County Donegal, Ireland

The Church of the Irish Martyrs is a Catholic church in the parish of Aughaninshin in the Ballyraine area of Letterkenny, County Donegal, Ireland.

== Description ==
Maurice Harron carved a 9 ft-high (2.7 m) stone cross on the church altar, and local sculptor Redmond Herrity created a jubilee stone that can be seen on display outside the church.

== History ==
In 1990, plans were drawn up for a new church project to cater for the growing population of the town. At the time it was estimated that a church capable of holding 800 people would be required. The church project was initiated by Bishop Anthony McFeely and opened in 1994. It was the first church in Ireland to be named after the Irish Catholic Martyrs.

RTÉ broadcast televised masses to a national audience on Holy Thursday and Good Friday during Holy Week 1997, with coverage also in the RTÉ Guide.

An old abbey in the parish dates back to the 13th or 14th century. In 2000, it was decided to create a new parish and call it after the abbey. The site of the abbey is visible from the church, and its graveyard, which dates from 1756, is still in use to this day. The parish has a Catholic population of 6,500.

Fr Joe O'Donnell celebrated Christmas Mass for children, working Santa and his beloved Leeds United into many of his sermons until his death from illness in the middle of 2019. Priests flooded in from all over the country with the Bishop in the middle of them.

Fourteen new Stations of the Cross were publicly unveiled at the Church of the Irish Martyrs on Ash Wednesday 2020, purchased at auction from St Mary's Convent in Derby and described by then administrator and parish priest Fr Brian Quinn as "the most significant piece of artwork to come into the church". The stations, consisting of oil and gold leaf on canvas and laid down on eight metal panels, date to the late-19th century. One is inscribed Studio J Lintbout St Croix, Bruges, Belgium. The church's original stations were simple crosses above Donegal Irish, by Hugo Bonner. Then, when the Loreto Convent in Milford shut, the Church of the Irish Martyrs received their stations.

Brian Quinn died from an illness when he was 64. It was only in June 2022 so less than three years after Fr Joe's death. Administrator since the opening of the building and parish priest since this became possible in 2000, Fr Quinn's remains reposed at the Church of the Irish Martyrs and the Bishop did his rain-soaked funeral.

As of 2024, the parish priest is Fr Ciaran Harkin, who is assisted by Fr Dominic Thoomkuzhy.

There was a high-profile brawl during Sunday Mass in August 2024, which made national and international news.
