= Siege of Alicante =

1708 siege

Coordinates: 38.350°N 0.483°W

- Part of War of the Spanish Succession
Date	3 December 1708 – 20 April 1709
Location	Alicante, Spain
Result	Franco-Spanish victory

Belligerents
Grand Alliance	(Kingdom of France) France; Spain

Commanders and leaders
(Portugal) John Richards †	(Kingdom of France) Claude D'Asfeld

Strength
Less than 1,000	10,000–12,000

The siege of Alicante took place from December 1708 to April 1709 during the War of the Spanish Succession. The city of Alicante was besieged by a French and Spanish force loyal to Philip V. They were opposed by the garrison, an Allied force under the command of John Richards.

After several months of siege, having successfully completed their task of delaying the enemy, the garrison eventually agreed terms of capitulation which allowed them to be evacuated to waiting British ships. The siege is most notable for a very large mine which was dug under the fortifications and detonated, killing Richards and many of his troops in February 1709.

== Background ==
Alicante had been taken by the Allies in 1706 in the wake of their landing at Barcelona the previous year. Following their victory over the Allies at the Battle of Almansa in 1707, forces loyal to Philip took the offensive and began recovering many of these towns and cities lost to the enemy.

== Bibliography ==
- Falkner, James. The War of the Spanish Succession 1701-1714. Pen and Sword, 2015.
- Hugill, J.A.C. No Peace Without Spain. Kensal Press, 1991.
- Williams, Basil. Stanhope: A Study in Eighteenth-Century War and Diplomacy. Clarendon Press, 1932.
