= Ballyraine Linear Park =

Town park

The Ballyraine Linear Park is situated on the outskirts of Letterkenny town. It is a park that has been developed over the last few years, and currently features a stone wall along a small walkway and an area of natural wildlife and plants.
