= William Pilsworth (priest) =

Irish Anglican cleric

William Pilsworth was the vicar of the Church of Ireland in Donadea, County Kildare, in the seventeenth century. His father, also called William Pilsworth, was Bishop of Kildare between 1604 and 1635.
