= Solomon Richards (soldier) =

Anglo-Irish soldier

- Born: 1619
- Died: 1691 (aged 71–72)
- Military career
- Conflicts: Siege of Derry

Solomon Richards was a professional soldier who fought in Ireland first for Cromwell and then for William of Orange. He is best known for his part in a failed attempt to relieve the Siege of Derry in 1689. In Irish history, Colonel Richards is best known for his role as a priest hunter and as one of the judges in 1654 who condemned underground Roman Catholic priest William Tirry, who was Beatified in 1992 as one of the Irish Catholic Martyrs.

== Family ==
He was born in 1619 and his baptism on 14 November 1619 is recorded in the parish registers of St Andrew, Holborn. The register states that he was the son of Salloman Richards and his wife Ann, a cutler living near the Cross Keyes. He married first Rhoda daughter of Samuel Wilson and Anne Miller. She was buried on 7 Nov 1645 at St Olave, Old Jewery having died in childbirth. They had a daughter Rhoda. He married secondly Abigail Goddard daughter of Henry Goddard, shipbuilder. The marriage took place before Henry made his will on 30 Aug 1647. Her brother Jonathon Goddard was Cromwell's personal physician.

== With Cromwell ==
Solomon Richards served as lieutenant-colonel of Oliver Cromwell's own regiment in the New Model Army. He took part in the Cromwellian conquest of Ireland and was granted an estate of 3,000 acres at Solsborough in County Wexford, probably under the terms of the Act for the Settlement of Ireland of 1652.

After Augustinian Friar William Tirry was arrested at Fethard while vested for Mass on Holy Saturday, 25 March, 1654, he was tried at Clonmel on 26 April, by a jury and a panel of Commonwealth judges, including Colonel Richards, for violating the Proclamation of 6 January 1653, which defined it as high treason for priests to remain in Ireland. In his own defense, Fr. Tirry replied that while he viewed the Commonwealth as the lawful government, he had no choice but to disobey its laws, as the Pope had ordered him to remain in Ireland. Fr. Tirry was according found guilty and sentenced to death by hanging, which was carried out in Clonmel on 2 May 1654.

In 1659 Col. Richards was appointed Governor of Wexford town. That was after Cromwell's death and perhaps even after the end of the protectorate in May 1659.

== Restoration ==
At the Restoration in 1660, he was deposed as governor of Wexford and was briefly imprisoned. He was released and was confirmed in the possession of his newly acquired lands by the Act of Settlement of 1662. For the following twenty-seven years he lived quietly on his Irish estate at Solsborough.

== Glorious Revolution ==
In September 1688 he was commissioned by King James II to raise a new regiment of foot to provide him with reliable troops to counter the menace of William's invasion. As a Protestant Richards seems an unusual choice but he was a nonconformist and James tried to create an alliance of Catholics and non-Anglican Protestants, both of whom had suffered from the Penal Laws. Rather than raising his regiment in Ireland as might be expected, he recruited his men from London and the Home Counties. Following James's flight to France, he sided with William and his regiment became part of William's reformed Army.

== Cunningham's Expedition to Derry ==
In the early phase of the ensuing Williamite war in Ireland, the city of Derry in Ulster, which was held for William by Lieutenant-Colonel Robert Lundy, was menaced by the Irish army of Tyrconnell and James II. William sent Colonel Cunningham with an expeditionary force to Derry to defend the city. This force consisted of two regiments of foot, Cunningham's own and Richards's, together about 1600 men. They sailed from Liverpool in 1689 on nine transport ships escorted by the fourth-rate frigate HMS Swallow and reached Lough Foyle downstream of the city on 15 April 1689. That very day Lundy suffered the defeat of the Battle of the Fords, where he led his Irish Protestant force in an attempt to prevent the Irish under Richard Hamilton and de Rosen from crossing the River Finn and approaching Derry. As Lundy's poorly organised troops streamed back towards the city walls, he issued several contradictory orders to Cunningham and Richards. They were summoned to a council of war in the city, where Lundy informed them that it was pointless landing their troops as the city's defeat and surrender were imminent.

Richards and Cunningham therefore sailed back to Britain without landing their troops just at the time when the Siege of Derry began in earnest. After their arrival back in England they were both dismissed from the command of their regiments for dereliction of duty. Richards was replaced by George St George, another Irishman. As Derry was able to hold out until a second relief force under General Percy Kirke arrived, questions were raised in the English Parliament about Cunningham's and Richards' conduct.

He died in 1691 and was buried in the North Cloister of Westminster Abbey on 6 October 1691.

== Legacy ==
Richards had many children. It is sometimes wrongly stated that he was the father of Jacob Richards an engineer officer, who also served William in Ireland (1689–91) where he was wounded during the Siege of Carrickfergus. Jacob and his brothers Michael and John were the sons of a certain Jacob Richards and his wife Ann. This mistake seems to have originated in one Betham's sketch pedigrees

Four hundred years after Col. Richards condemned him to death, Fr. William Tirry was beatified by Pope John Paul II along with 16 other Irish Catholic Martyrs on 27 September 1993. The Augustinian Order annually celebrates his feast day on 12 May.

== Notes and references ==
- Chester, Joseph Lemuel (1876), Registers of Westminster Abbey, London: Private Edition
- Childs, John (1980), The Army, James II, and the Glorious Revolution, Manchester: Manchester University Press, ISBN 0-7190-1987-7
- Childs, John (1987), The British Army of William III, 1689-1702, Manchester: Manchester University Press, ISBN 0-7190-1987-7
- Doherty, Richard (2008), The Siege of Derry 1689 - The Military History, Chalford: Spellmount, ISBN 978-0-7524-5536-5
- Christopher Richards Richards of Solsborough, Co Wexford The Irish Genealogist 2003 Vol 11 no 2 pages 106-117
- Sir William Betham, sketch pedigrees Vol VIII. 53 ms 268 in the National Library of Ireland
