= James Craggs the Elder =

British politician (1657–1721)

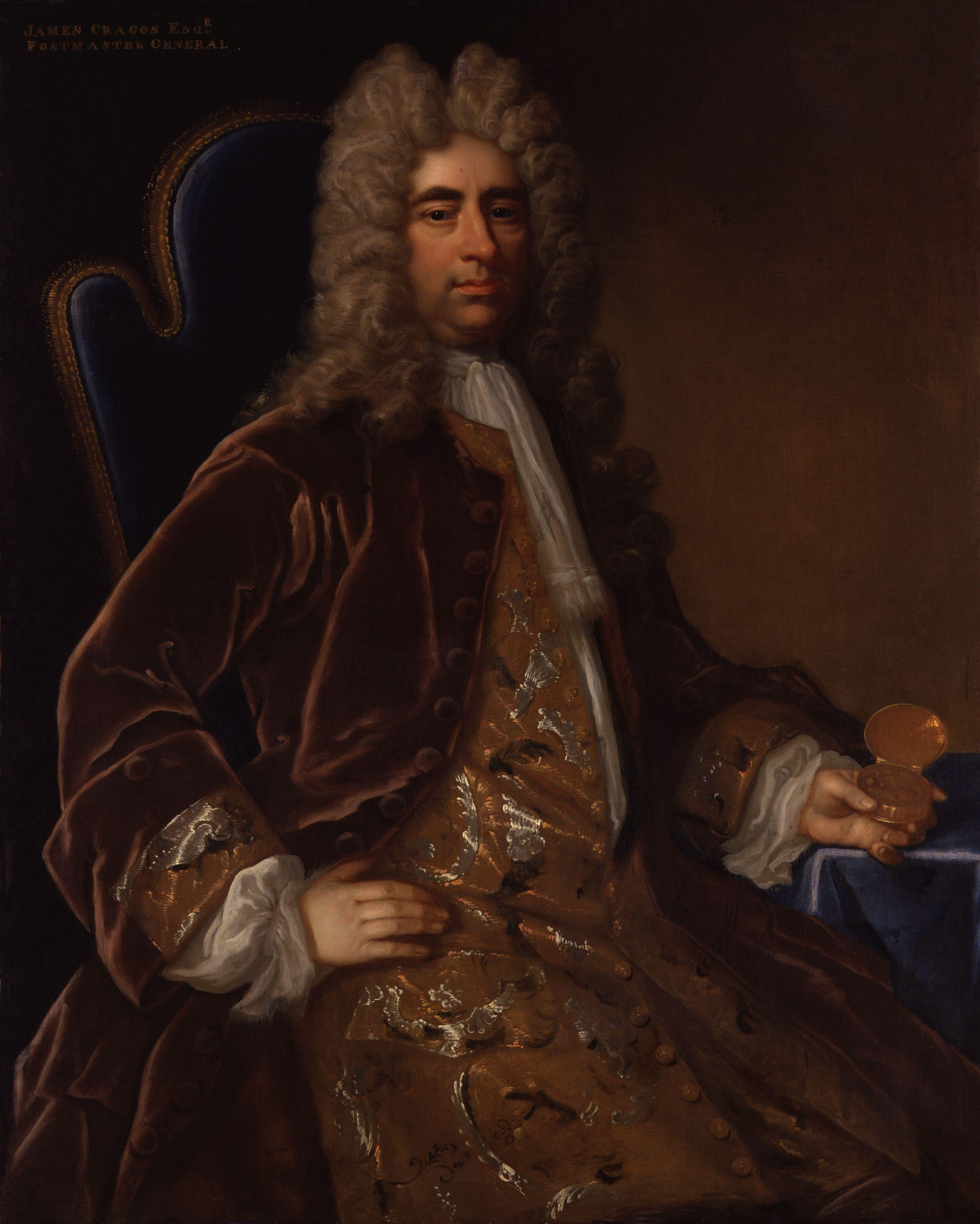
James Craggs, 1710

James Craggs the Elder (1657 – 16 March 1721), of Jermyn Street, Westminster and Charlton, Lewisham, Kent, was an English financier and Whig politician who sat in the English and British House of Commons from 1702 to 1713.

== Life ==
Craggs was baptized on 10 June 1657, the eldest son of Anthony Craggs of Wolsingham, county of Durham, and his wife Anne Morcroft, daughter of Rev. Ferdinando Morcroft, DD, of Goswich, Lancashire, rector of Stanhope-in-Wardell, county Durham, and prebendary of Durham. He was educated at Bishop Auckland grammar school.

After following various callings in London, Craggs, who was a person of considerable financial ability, entered the service of the Duchess of Marlborough. Through her influence he was returned at the 1702 English general election as Member of Parliament for Grampound. He retained the seat until the 1713 British general election.

Craggs was in business as an army clothier and held several official positions, becoming joint Postmaster-General in 1715. Making the most of his opportunities in all these capacities, he amassed a great deal of money. Craggs also increased his wealth by mixing in the affairs of the South Sea Company, including as a company director, but after his death an act of parliament confiscated all the property which he had acquired since December 1719. He left an enormous fortune when he died in disgrace for his involvement in the South Sea Bubble, a month after the death of his son. It is possible that Craggs the Elder committed suicide.

He married Elizabeth Richards, daughter of the Irish artillery officer Jacob Richards corn chandler, of Westminster on 4 January 1684. Their children included James Craggs the Younger; and Anne Craggs, wife of Robert Nugent, 1st Earl Nugent; Elizabeth, wife of Edward Eliot; and Margaret, wife, firstly of Samuel Trefusis, and secondly of Sir John Hinde Cotton.

Parliament of England
Preceded by Sir William Scawen; Francis Scobell	Member of Parliament for Grampound; 1702–1707; With: Francis Scobell 1702–1707	Succeeded by Parliament of Great Britain
Parliament of Great Britain
Preceded by Parliament of England	Member of Parliament for Grampound; 1707–1713; With: Francis Scobell 1707–1708; Thomas Scawen 1708–1710; Thomas Coke 1710–1713	Succeeded by Thomas Coke; Andrew Quick
Military offices
Preceded by John Pulteney	Clerk of the Deliveries of the Ordnance; 1703–1711	Succeeded by Newdigate Ousley
Preceded by Richard King	Clerk of the Deliveries of the Ordnance; 1714–1715	Succeeded by Thomas Frankland
Political offices
Preceded by Sir Thomas Frankland, Bt; Sir John Evelyn, Bt	Postmaster General of the United Kingdom; 1715–1720; With: The Lord Cornwallis	Succeeded by Galfridus Walpole; Edward Carteret
