= Siege of Carrickfergus =

1689 siege

- Part of Williamite War in Ireland
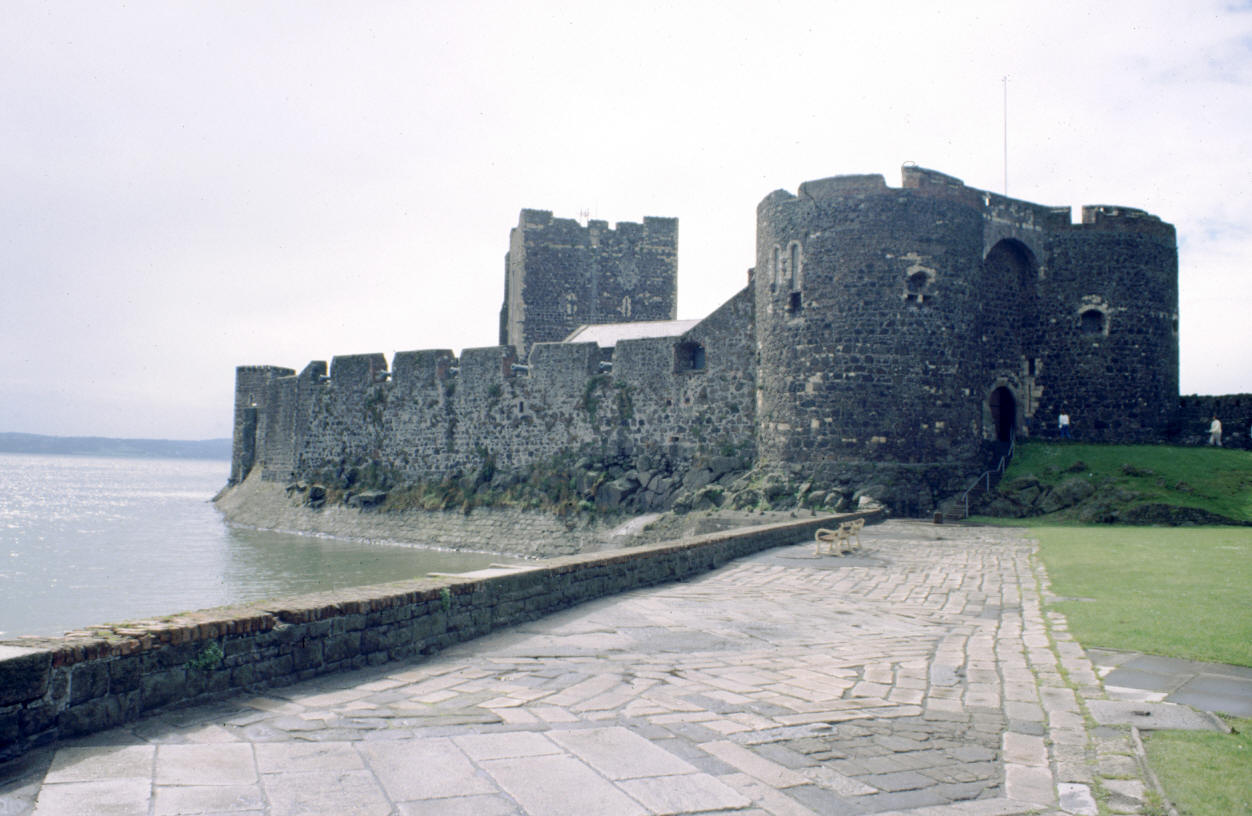
- Carrickfergus Castle
Date	20–27 August 1689 (1 week)
Location	Carrickfergus, County Antrim, Ireland
Result	Williamite victory

Belligerents
Williamites	Jacobites

Commanders and leaders
Marshal Schomberg	Charles MacCarthy More; Cormac O'Neill

Strength
Unknown	500

Casualties and losses
200 killed	150 killed

The siege of Carrickfergus took place in August 1689 when a force of Williamite troops under Marshal Schomberg landed and laid siege to the Jacobite garrison of Carrickfergus in Ireland. After a week the Jacobites surrendered, and were allowed to march out with the honours of war.

== Background ==
Carrickfergus was a traditional stronghold of the Crown in Ulster, commanded by the Norman-era Carrickfergus Castle. During 1689 with its Irish Army garrison, it became a refuge for Catholic inhabitants of the region to flee to as the northern rebellion against James II's rule grew. In February 1689 local Protestant forces made a failed attempt to storm the town.

After the Break of Dromore on 14 March, Richard Hamilton's Jacobite forces had swept through Eastern Ulster bringing all of County Down and Antrim under their control. Carrickfergus and its surrounding area were securely under Jacobite rule as Hamilton advanced to lay siege to Derry, one of the few remaining Protestant strongholds in Ireland. What had initially seemed as though it would be a quick victory began to drag out through the summer, particularly as some Jacobite forces had to be diverted to confront the defenders of Enniskillen. Meanwhile, a series of relief forces were being prepared in England. Percy Kirke led an expedition to Derry, where the siege was finally broken on 28 July. In the face of the sudden defeat, Jacobite forces began to withdraw from Derry and employed a scorched earth policy as they retreated.

== Landing ==
A second major wave of reinforcements was assembled at Chester under the veteran Huguenot commander Frederick Schomberg, 1st Duke of Schomberg. While it was originally suggested that they might head for Cork, it was decided that they should be landed in Ulster. By the time the expedition sailed from Hoylake on 12 August 1689, news of the relief of Derry had reached England. It meant that Schomberg could now act offensively. During a council of war, the expedition's officers decided to make for Belfast Lough rather than Carlingford Lough, allowing them to join up with the advancing Irish Protestant forces of Derry and Enniskillen.

By 13 August the expedition was in sight of the Mountains of Mourne. They were accompanied into Bangor Bay by George Rooke who had led a Royal Navy force to clear Belfast Lough of French shipping. The same afternoon Schomberg began disembarking his men. He kept them at the alert in case the Jacobite garrisons of nearby Belfast, Bangor and Carrickfergus should attack, but there was no opposition as the troops were brought ashore. The artillery and supply ships arrived separately a few days later. By the end of August, a total of six cavalry and nine infantry regiments had been landed safely at Carrickfergus.

The landing added to a series of setbacks for the Jacobites including their failures at Derry and Enniskillen and the defeat of a Jacobite force at the Battle of Newtownbutler. Faced with strong Williamite forces in both the north-west and north-east, the Jacobite commander in the north Thomas Maxwell ordered a withdrawal towards Newry. At Carrickfergus he left a garrison which consisted of Charles MacCarthy More's infantry regiment and nine companies of the Protestant Jacobite Cormac O'Neill's regiment. The garrison were charged with delaying Schomberg's army for as long as possible. The Jacobites abandoned Belfast which was swiftly occupied by Henry Wharton's English regiment.

== Siege ==
As Schomberg wanted to march on Dublin before the winter set in, he intended to move rapidly to reduce Carrickfergus. He marched through to Belfast, sending out patrols to prevent plundering in the area by the retreating Jacobites.

On 14 August, expecting an imminent siege, the Jacobites had set fire to the town's suburbs to deny their cover to the besiegers. They had tried to prepare Carrickfergus to withstand an assault, but much of the town's defences were decayed from lack of recent use. On 20 August Schomberg marched to Carrickfergus with five regiments, followed by another seven on the following day. They joined up with newly arrived Enniskillen troops under General Percy Kirke. The first skirmishes began around the town on the same day. Schomberg sent a message summoning the town to surrender. The defenders asked for time to send a message to King James, asking for his advice. Schomberg rejected this as a delaying tactic to waste time. Shortly after the parley had taken place, the town's artillery took aim at Schomberg's command tent but he was absent at the time.

During that night the Williamites dug trenches in an attempt to move as close to the walls possible, prompting intense exchanges of fire. Schomberg's artillery targeted the town house of the absent Lord Donegall, which had been taken over by the defenders and cannons mounted there. Using intelligence received from local inhabitants the artillery fire became more carefully directed. Although Schomberg had initially spared Carrickfergus Castle from fire, probably because he hoped to use it after the town fell, he now ordered his artillery to open up on it. After his chief Engineer Jacob Richards was wounded, Schomberg had to take over much of his duties due to the lack of qualified replacements. However further infantry and cavalry reinforcements now arrived by boat.

During another parley, Schomberg rejected a demand that the garrison be allowed to surrender with the honours of war, to be able to march away with their weapons to the nearest Jacobite garrison, and insisted on unconditional surrender. Many of the garrison wanted to agree to the terms, but a group led by Colonel Owen MacCarthy and Governor MacCarthy More were determined to hold out. Williamite fire had created a breach near the North Gate, but at night, the defenders desperately tried to fill it in and make other running repairs on the defences.

To add to the pressure on the defenders, Schomberg ordered Royal Naval vessels in the harbour to join in the bombardment. Although the garrison had good stocks of food, they were already running low on gunpowder. By the evening of 27 August, with Henry Wharton's regiment poised to make an assault against the breach, the Jacobites ran up a white flag and agreed to surrender. Schomberg had reversed his earlier position and was now willing to grant them the honours of war, allowing the garrison to march to Newry with their weapons and baggage.

== Aftermath ==
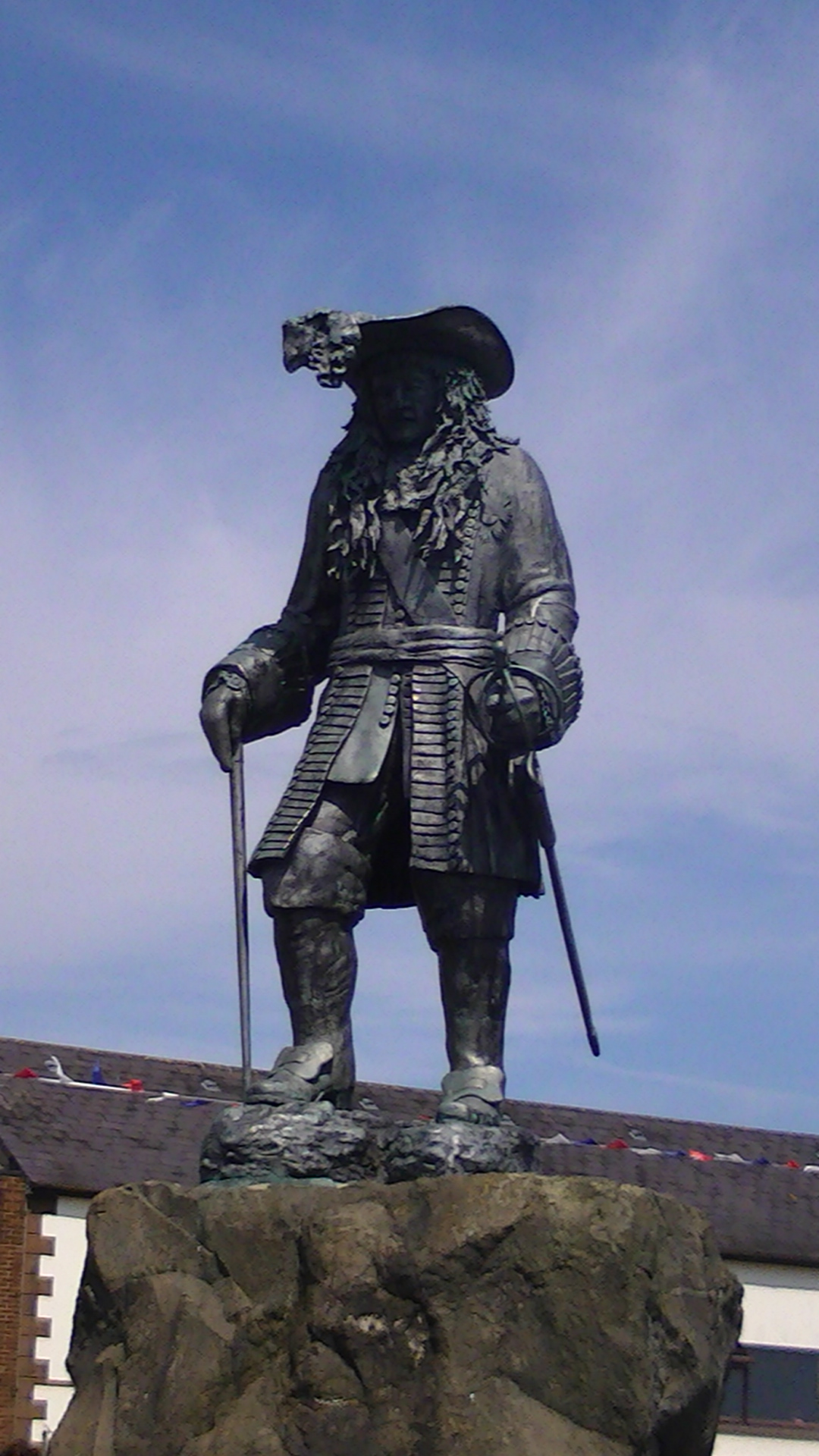
A statue of William III commemorating his landing at Carrickfergus in 1690.

Many of the town's buildings had been hit during the artillery duel. On the morning of 28 August the garrison, accompanied by their families and other camp followers, marched out of Carrickfergus. A cavalry escort under Sir William Russell was provided to accompany them some of the way towards Jacobite-controlled Newry. Soon after they set off, the Catholic troops began to be robbed of their clothes, possessions and weapons by local Protestant civilians as compensation for the plundering and general persecution they had suffered during the Jacobite occupation of the town. The escort was overwhelmed by the weight of numbers, and many of the Catholics ran for shelter amongst the ranks of the Williamite infantry regiments standing outside Carrickfergus. Order was finally restored when Schomberg rode amongst them firing his pistol.

In response to Schomberg's landing, King James called out the militia across Ireland, and began making preparations to defend Dublin. After leaving Sir Henry Ingoldsby's regiment to garrison Carrickfergus, Schomberg and his main force departed the town on 28 August. However, Schomberg's progress southwards was slower than he intended, and having reached Dundalk by 7 September he had to halt his force there due to lack of supplies, which were still being shipped through the increasingly distant Carrickfergus.

Faced with a large Jacobite field army, under the command of James II, Schomberg remained at Dundalk Camp during the autumn, where his army suffered terribly from illness, losing thousands of dead. Many of the Williamite sick were shipped via Carrickfergus to the hospital in Belfast. After a stand-off between the two armies, involving several skirmishes, both went into winter quarters.

In June 1690 William of Orange landed at Carrickfergus, shortly before beginning the campaign that would lead to his victory at the Battle of the Boyne the following month.

== Bibliography ==
- Barratt, John. Battles for the Three Kingdoms: The Campaigns for England, Scotland and Ireland, 1689-92. Sutton, 2007.
- Childs, John. The Williamite Wars in Ireland. Bloomsbury Publishing, 2007.
- McNally, Michael. Battle of the Boyne 1690: The Irish Campaign for the English Crown. Osprey Publishing, 2005.
