= Recusancy in Ireland =

The Recusancy referred to those who refused to attend services of the state-established Anglican Church of Ireland. The individuals were known as "recusants". The term, which derives ultimately from the Latin recusare (to refuse or make an objection), was first used in England to refer to those who remained within the Roman Catholic Church and did not attend services of the Church of England, with a 1593 statute determining the penalties against "Popish recusants".

The native Irish and the "Old English" (who had come to Ireland at the time of the Normans), while subject to the English crown as part of the Kingdom of Ireland, were overwhelmingly opposed to the Anglican and dissenting churches, and the vast majority remained Catholic, which had tragic implications for the later history of Ireland (such as the Irish Penal Laws). The Catholics of Ireland suffered the same penalties as recusants in England, which were exacerbated by impatience with the rebellious nature of the Irish, English contempt for a subject race and the desire for Irish land and property.

== History ==
In 1559 the Irish Parliament passed both the Act of Supremacy and the Act of Uniformity, the former prescribing to all officers the Oath of Supremacy, the latter prohibiting the Mass and commanding the public use of the Book of Common Prayer. Whoever refused the Oath of Supremacy was dismissed from office, and whoever refused to attend the Protestant service was fined 12 pence for each offence. A subsequent viceregal proclamation ordered all priests to leave Dublin and prohibited the use of images, candles, and beads. The "Recusancy Acts", which began during the reign of Elizabeth I and which were repealed in 1650, imposed a number of punishments on those who did not participate in Anglican religious activity, including fines, property confiscation, and imprisonment. The purpose of the Acts was to compel Irish Catholics and members of other churches such as the Puritans or Presbyterians to attend their local Church of Ireland church.

After 1570, when Elizabeth was excommunicated by the papal bull Regnans in Excelsis, persecution increased; and the hunting down of the Gerald FitzGerald, 15th Earl of Desmond, the Desmond Rebellions and the desolation of Munster, in addition to the torture, trial before military tribunal, and hanging of Archbishop Dermot O'Hurley outside the walls of Dublin. Many others who kept to the Catholic religion were treated in the same fashion.

The reign of James I (1603–25) started tolerantly, but the 1605 Gunpowder Plot confirmed an official anti-Catholic religious bias, and the recusant fines continued, but not at the higher levels imposed on English Catholics by the Popish Recusants Act 1605. Recusant fines were collected on a haphazard basis until the Cromwellian conquest of Ireland in 1649, after which all Catholic worship was banned.

From the Restoration of King Charles II in 1660 no fines or laws about recusancy persisted; state policy allowed for many different churches but preserved the official position of Anglicanism.

== See also ==
- Nonconformism
- Papist
