= Mac Aodhagáin =

Irish clan of lawyers

MacEgan Mac Aodhagáin
- Parent house: Uí Maine
- Country: Kingdom of Connacht
- Founder: Aedhaghan mac Gosda
- Titles: Hereditary Brehons of Ireland; Ollam to the Ó Conchobhair; Ollam to the Mac William Uachtar; Ollam to the Mac William Iochtar; Ollam to the Conmhaicne; Ollam to the Uí Briúin Bréifne; Ollam to the Tethbae; Ollam to the Ó Fearghail; Ollam to the Ó Conchobhair Uí Failghe

Mac Aodhagáin (English: Egan or Keegan), is an Irish Gaelic clan of Brehons who were hereditary lawyers - firstly to the Ó Conchobhair Kings of Connacht, and later to the Burkes of Clanricarde.

The earliest surviving Irish law manuscript, In Senchas Már, was written prior to 1350 at a school (patronised by the Mac Aodhagáin) at Duniry, near Loughrea. Other branches of the clann maintained schools at Park, outside Tuam, and at Ballymacegan in Co. Tipperary.

== Naming conventions ==
The surname has been Anglicised in a variety of ways, including as Mac Egan, Egan, Eagan, Keegan, Keeghan, McKeegan, or Keigan, McKiegan, and McKagan.

Male	Daughter	Wife (Long)	Wife (Short)
Mac Aodhagáin	Nic Aodhagáin	Bean Mhic Aodhagáin	Mhic Aodhagáin
Mac Aogáin	Nic Aogáin	Bean Mhic Aogáin	Mhic Aogáin

== Annalistic references ==
- AC1225.30 Tadc O Finnachta, an officer of Aed son of Ruaidri [O Conchobair] was killed by Mac Aedacan's men on a plundering raid in this same war.
- AC1273.4 Jordan d'Exeter raided the Corann, and a few of the Connacht princes came up with his party; but they were incited to an unwise move by an evil(?) man, so that Domnall son of Donnchad son of Magnus [O Conchobair] and Magnus son of Art and Oirechtach Mac Aedacain and Aed O Birn and many others were killed.
- M1474.21 Gilla-Finn Mac Egan, Ollav to O'Conor Faly ... died. Gilla Fionn Mac Aodhagáin, Ollamh Ó Conchubhair Failghe
- M1486.29 Teige Mac Egan, Ollav of Annaly, was slain in an abominable manner by the descendants of Irial O'Farrell. Teige Mac Aodhagáin
- M1487.24 John, the son of Conor Mac Egan, Ollav of Clanrickard, and Hugh, the son of Brian, son of Farrel Roe O'Higgin, died. Sean mac Conchubhair Mac Aodhagáin
- M1529.8 Cosnamhach, the son of Farrell, son of Donough Duv Mac Egan, the most distinguished adept in the Fenechas, poetry, and lay Brehonship, in all the Irish territories, died, and was interred at Elphin. An Cosnamhach Mac Aodhagáin
- M1529.9 Mac Egan of Ormond (Donnell, the son of Hugh, son of Donnell), head of the learned of Leath-Mhogha in Feneachus and poetry, died. Domhnall mac Aedh Mac Aodhagáin

== Family trees from Geinealaigh Clainne Aodhagáin, below ==
- Muirchertach Mac Aodhagáin
  - Saérbrethach
    - Mac Aodhagáin Magnus of Munster
  - Donnchad Mór
    - Mac Aodhagáin of Connacht, Westmeath and Leinster
  - Aed
    - Domnall
      - Aed Gilla Ísa

   Muirchertach Mac Aodhagáin
   |
   |_______________________________________________
   |                       |                      |
   |                       |                      |
   Saérbrethach       Donnchad Mór                Mael Ísu
   |                       |                      |
   |                       |                      |
 Mac Aodhagáin      Mac Aodhagáin of Connacht,    Magnus
 of Munster          Westmeath and Leinster       |
                                                  |
                                                  Aed
                                                  |
                                                  |
                                                  Domnall
                                                  |
                                                  |
                                                  Aed Gilla Ísa

== Mac Aodhagáin of Munster ==
   Muirchertach Mac Aodhagáin
   |
   |_______________________________________________
   |                       |                      |
   |                       |                      |
   Saérbrethach       Donnchad Mór                Mael Ísu
   |
   |_____________________________________________________________
   |                                          |                 |
   |                                          |                 |
   Gilla na Naem                              Fland             Fingin
   |                                          |                 |
   |__________________                        |                 |
   |                 |                    Saérbrethach          Fingin
   |                 |                        |                 |
   Saérbrethach      Dond Sléibhe             |                 |
   |                 |                  Mael Isu Ruadh,         Saerdalach
   |                 |                    d. 1317.
   Fland             Gilla na Naem
   |                 |
   |                 |_________________________
   Tomás             |              |        |
   |                 |              |        |
   |                 Conchobar   Cairbre   Fiachra
   Tomás Aimréid     |
   |                 |_______________________________________________________________________
   |                 |                           |                 |                        |
   Conchobar         |                           |                 |                        |
   |                 Gilla na Naem, d. 1399.     Aed, d. 1359.     Tadcc                Donall, d. 1413.
   |                 |                                                                      |
   Cairbre           |______________________________________________                        |
                     |                        |       |           |                     Conchobar
                     |                        |       |           |                         |
                     Gilla na Naem, d. 1443.  Aed   Domnall    Donnchad        _____________|_____________________________
                     |                                |                        |            |                           |
    _________________|          ______________________|________________        |            |                           |
    |                |          |    |       |          |             |        Sean       Tadcc                    Baethgalach
    |                |          |    |       |          |             |        |                                        |
    Gilla na Naem    Cairbre    Aed  Fergal  Conchobar  Muirchertach  Eogan    |                                        |_________
    |                |          |                                              |                                        |        |
    |                |          |                   ___________________________|_______________________                 |        |
    Domnall          Donnchad   Domnall, d. 1529.   |           |              |          |          |                  Domnall  Tacc,
    |               & William                       |           |              |          |          |                  |        Aed Clerech,
    |                                               Brian   An Cosnamach   Conchobar  Muircheartach  Gilla na Naem      |        William.
    An Cosnamaid                                                                                                        |
    |                                                                                                         __________|
    |                                                                                                         |         |
    Cairbre                                                                                                   |         |
    |                                                                                                         Cairbre  Baethgalach
    |_____________________________________
    |          |          |          |
    |          |          |          |
    William  Flann    Donnchad   Cairbre Óge
    |       d. 1643   d. 1602     d. 1601
    |
    Seán, fl. 1644.

== Mac Aodhagáin of Lower Connacht ==
  Muirchertach Mac Aodhagáin
   |
   |_______________________________________________
   |                       |                      |
   |                       |                      |
   Saérbrethach       Donnchad Mór                Mael Ísu
   |                       |                      |
   |                       |                      |
 Mac Aodhagáin             |                      Magnus
 of Munster                |
                           |
   ________________________|_________
   |                       |        |
   |                       |        |
   Baethgalach          Diarmait    Donnchad Claen
   |                     issue        issue

== Mac Aodhagáin of Cineil Fiachrach and Offaly ==
  Muirchertach Mac Aodhagáin
   |
   |_______________________________________________
   |                       |                      |
   |                       |                      |
   Saérbrethach       Donnchad Mór                Mael Ísu
   |                       |                      |
   |                       |                      |
 Mac Aodhagáin             |                      Magnus
 of Munster                |
                           |
   ________________________|_________
   |                       |        |
   |                       |        |
   Baethgalach          Diarmait    Donnchad Claen
   |                     issue        issue

== Mac Aodhagáin Ollamhs of Connacht ==
   Muirchertach Mac Aodhagáin
   |
   |_______________________________________________
   |                       |                      |
   |                       |                      |
   Saérbrethach       Donnchad Mór                Mael Ísu
   |                       |                      |
   |                       |                      |
 Mac Aodhagáin             |                      Magnus
 of Munster                |
                           |
   ________________________|______________
   |                       |             |
   |                       |             |
   Baethgalach          Diarmait         Donnchad Claen
 (see Lower Connacht)      |
                           |_________________________________________________________________________________
                           |                                                                               |
                           |                                                                               |
                      Sairbrethach                                                                         In Cosnamaid
                           |                                                                               |
                           |                                                                               |
                     Mael Isa Dond, d. 1330.                                                               Crimthann
                           |                                                                               |
    _______________________|________________________________________________________________               |
    |                                  |         |                      |      |          |                Aed
    |                                  |         |                      |      |          |
    Sairbrethach Caech, d. 1354.     Roiberd     Muirchertach Buidhe    Sean   Donnchad   Tomas Tuathach
    |                                  |         |
    |_________________________         |         |____________________
    |                        |       Eogan       |                   |
    |                        |                   |                   |
    Solam               Saerdalach              Tomaltach Carrach    Baethgalach
    |                        |                                       |
    |     ___________________|                                       |
    |     |                  |                                       Eogan
    |     |                  |                                       |
    |     Donnchad Dub       Rioberd                                 |
    |     |                  |                                       Eogan
    |     |                  |________________________________
    |     |                  |                   |           |
    |     |                  |                   |           |
    |     |                  Brian, d. 1473.     Sean        Toinn Buidhe
    |     |                  |                   |           |
    |     |                  |                   |           |
    |     |                  Aed,                Roiberd     Solam Buidhe
    |     |                  Magnus.
    |     |______________________________________________________________________________________________________________________
    |     |                      |                  |                  |        |      |              |                |      |
    |     |                      |                  |                  |        |      |              |                |      |
    |     Brian Carrach        Fergal              Aed            Saerdalach    Eogan  Gilla na Naem  Domnall Clerech  Tadcc  Diarmait Buidhe
    |     |                      |                  |                  |
    |     |                      |                  |                  |
    |     Sean,               Conchobar,          Uilliam,           Tadcc,
    |     Uilliam,            Saerdalach,         Tadcc,             Sean.
    |     Saerdalach,       Muirchertach C.,      Mael-Ruin,
    |     Cormac G.,      An Cosnamaid, d. 1529.  Donnchad,
    |     Conchobar.                              Cairbre.
    |        na-Tet
    |     an brathair
    |____________________________________________________________________________
    |                                                                           |
    |                                                                           |
    Airechtach                                                                  Mael Isu
    |                                                                           |
    |                                                                           |____________________
    Gilla na Naem, d. 1447.                                                     |                  |
    |                                                                           |                  |
    |________________________________________________________________           Saerbrethach    An Cosnamaid Caech
    |                  |              |               |            |            |                  |
    |                  |              |               |            |            |                  |
    Tadcc, d.1487.  An Cosnmaid   Baethgalach   Gilla na Naem Oc   Fergal       Conchobar,         Caibre,
                                                                                & Aed.             William,
                                                                                                   & Tadcc.

== Mac Aodhagáin of Breifine and Teathba ==
   Muirchertach Mac Aodhagáin
   |
   |_______________________________________________
   |                       |                      |
   |                       |                      |
   Saérbrethach       Donnchad Mór                Mael Ísu
   |                       |                      |
   |                       |                      |
 Mac Aodhagáin             |                      Magnus
 of Munster                |
                           |
   ________________________|_________
   |                       |        |
   |                       |        |
   Baethgalach          Diarmait    Donnchad Claen
   of Lower Connacht    issue       |
   _________________________________|
   |                                |
   |                                |
   Luccas Mael                      Simon (see Mac Aodhagáin of Clanricarde)
   |
   |_______________________________________________
   |                                              |
   |                                              |
   Tadcc Bacach                                   Brian
   |                                              |
   |_______________________________               |_____________________________________________
   |          |         |        |                |                                            |
   |          |         |        |                |                                            |
   Brian,     Sean,     Cormac   Roiberd          Magnus                                     Solam
  d. 1390.   d. 1390.                             |                                            |
   _______________________________________________|                                            |
   |            |                 |                                                          Maine
   |            |                 |
   Fergal     Cormac              Sean Sagart
   |            |                 |
   |     _______|____             |
   |     |          |             Muirchertach, d. 1409.
   |     |          |
   |     Cairbre    Cathal Ruad
   |
   |
   |_____________________________________________
   |      |       |                 |          |
   |      |       |                 |          |
   Eogan  Magnus  Donnchad Clerech  Feidlimid  Emann

== Mac Aodhagáin of Clanricarde ==
  Muirchertach Mac Aodhagáin
   |
   |_______________________________________________
   |                       |                      |
   |                       |                      |
   Saérbrethach       Donnchad Mór                Mael Ísu
   |                       |                      |
   |                       |                      |
 Mac Aodhagáin             |                      Magnus
 of Munster                |
                           |
   ________________________|_________
   |                       |        |
   |                       |        |
   Baethgalach          Diarmait    Donnchad Claen
   of Lower Connacht    issue       |
   _________________________________|
   |                                |
   |                                |
   Simon                      Luccas Mael
   |
   |____________________________________________________________________________________________________________________
   |                                                                  |                                                |
   |                                                                  |                                                |
   Sairbrethach                                                       Mael Isa                                    Saerdalach
   |                                                                  |
   |_________________________________________________                 |_______________________________
   |                                  |             |                 |        |                     |
   |                                  |             |                 |        |                     |
   Fland                              Solam     In Decanach           Aed    Raigne                  Donnchad
   |                                  |             |                 |        |                     |
   |           _______________________|             |                 |        |____________         |
   |           |             |        |         Diarmait            Fland      |           |         Raigne
   |           |             |        |                                        |           |         |
   |           Diarmait   William    Tadcc                                     Aed     Tomaltach     |
   |           |             |                                                             |         Domnall
   |           |             |                                                             |
   |           Diarmait   Donnchad                                                   Gilla na Naem
   |           |                                                                           |
   |           |                                                                           |
   |           Eogan                                                                 An Cosnamaid
   |           |
   |           |
   |           Conchobar
   Finguine
   |
   |
   Conchobar Ruad, d. 1438.
   |
   |_________________________________________________________________
   |              |       |         |       |               |      |
   |              |       |         |       |               |      |
   Domnall Glas   Tadcc   William   Eogan   Gilla na Naem   Aed    Sean, d. 1487.
   |
   |
   Domnall Oc
   |
   |
   Tadcc
   |
   |
   Tadcc Oc
   |
   |
   Baethgalach

== List of people ==
People with the surnames of "Egan" and "Keegan"- their descent from the Mac Aodhagáin not in all cases established- include:

=== Egan ===
- Boetius Egan (archbishop of Tuam) (1734–1798), Roman Catholic prelate
- Boetius Egan (bishop of Elphin) (died 1650), Roman Catholic prelate
- Chandler Egan, golfer
- Chris Egan (disambiguation), several people
- Daniel Egan, former mayor of Sydney, Australia
- Dennis Egan (born 1947), Alaska politician
- Eddie Eagan (1897–1967), only athlete to win gold medals in both Summer (boxing) and Winter (4-man bobsled) Olympics
- Eddie Egan (1930–1995), New York police detective depicted in The French Connection
- Edward Egan, Roman Catholic Cardinal
- Felim Egan, painter
- George W. Egan, South Dakota politician
- Gerard Egan, psychologist
- Greg Egan, science fiction author
- James Egan (disambiguation), several people called James or Jim
- Jane Egan, athlete, lawyer
- Jennifer Egan, author
- Joe Egan (disambiguation), several people
- John Egan (disambiguation), several people
- Kenny Egan, boxer
- Johnny Egan (basketball), basketball player and coach
- Joseph F. Egan (c.1917–1964), New York politician
- Joseph V. Egan, New Jersey politician
- Kian Egan, singer, part of the band Westlife
- Kieran Egan (educationist), English educator
- Kieran Egan (politician), Irish politician
- Mark Egan, jazz musician
- Matthew Egan, Australian Rules footballer
- Maureen Egan, American writer and director of music videos and films
- Maurice Francis Egan, American writer and diplomat
- Michael Egan (disambiguation), several people
- Philip Egan (born 1955), Bishop of Portsmouth
- Pierce Egan, journalist
- Richard Egan (disambiguation), several people
- Roma Egan, ballet dancer
- Seamus Egan, musician
- Sean Egan, computer software developer
- Susan Egan, American actress
- Ted Egan, Australian folk musician and Administrator of the Northern Territory
- Thomas Egan (disambiguation), several people
- Timothy Egan, writer
- Walter Egan (born 1948), American musician
- Walter Egan (golfer), golfer
- William Egan (disambiguation), several people

=== Keegan ===
- Andrew Keegan (born 1979), American actor
- Betty Ann Keegan (1920–1974), American politician
- Bob Keegan (baseball) (1920–2001), American baseball player
- Chad Keegan (born 1979), South African cricketer
- Claire Keegan (born 1968), Irish writer
- Colm Keegan, (born 1989), Singer in Celtic Thunder
- Ged Keegan (born 1955), English footballer
- Jake Keegan (born 1991), American soccer player
- Jimmy Keegan (born 1969), American musician
- Sir John Keegan (1934–2012), English military historian and author
- John C. Keegan (born 1952), American judge, retired military officer, and Arizona politician
- Kevin Keegan (born 1951), English football manager and former player
- Lisa Graham Keegan, American education reform advocate, Arizona politician and political activist
- Marina Keegan (1989–2012), American author
- Michelle Keegan (born 1987), British actress
- Paul Keegan (born 1972), Irish footballer
- Paul Keegan (born 1984), Irish footballer
- Rose Keegan (born 1965), British actress
- Rupert Keegan (born 1955), English racing driver
- Scarlett Keegan (born 1984), American model and actress
- Victor Keegan (born 1940), British journalist and author focusing on economics and technology issues

== See also ==
- Redwood Castle
- Aed mac Conchbair Mac Aodhagáin, (1330–1359), bard
- Baothghalach Mór Mac Aodhagáin (1550–1600), poet
- Gilla na Naemh Mac Aodhagáin (d. 1399), professor of judiciary
