= Egan (surname) =

Egan is a surname that comes from the Irish Gaelic name Mac Aodhagáin. It is derived from the root 'aedh' meaning little fire and the diminutive 'an' hence 'the little bright-eyed one'. Variations include: Egan, Eagan, Keegan, McKeegan, MacEgan, Kegan, Keagan and Egen. The name originates from County Tipperary (north).

== People with this surname ==
- Andrea Egan, British trade unionist
- Anthony Egan, Gaelic footballer
- Alice Mary Egan (1872–1972), later known as Alice Mary Hagen, Canadian ceramic artist
- Babe Egan (1897–1966), American jazz violinist and bandleader
- Chandler Egan, golfer
- Chris Egan (disambiguation), several people
- Connie Egan, Northern Irish politician
- Damien Egan (born 1981 or 1982), British politician
- Daniel Egan, former mayor of Sydney, Australia
- Dennis Egan (1947–2022), Alaska politician
- Desmond Egan (born 1936), Irish poet, publisher, and festival organizer.
- Eddie Egan (1930–1995), New York City Police Department detective depicted in The French Connection
- Edward Egan (1932-2015), Roman Catholic Cardinal
- Eugene Egan, Catholic apostolic vicar in Ireland
- Felim Egan, painter
- Geoff Egan, British archaeologist and small finds expert
- George W. Egan, South Dakota politician
- Ger Egan (born 1990/1991), Westmeath Gaelic footballer
- Gerard Egan, psychologist
- Greg Egan, author
- Harry Egan, English footballer
- Howard Egan, a Pony Express rider, Major in the Mormon Battalion, and one of the original pioneers of Salt Lake Valley in Utah, USA.
- James Egan (disambiguation), several people called James or Jim
- Jennifer Egan, author
- Joe Egan (disambiguation), several people
- John Egan (disambiguation), several people
- Johnny Egan (basketball), basketball player and coach
- Joseph F. Egan (c.1917–1964), New York politician
- Joseph V. Egan, New Jersey politician
- Kenny Egan, boxer
- Kian Egan (born 1980), singer, part of the band Westlife
- Kieran Egan (educationist), English educator
- Kieran Egan (politician), Irish politician
- Lavinia Hartwell Egan, American writer, suffragist, clubwoman
- Mark Egan, jazz musician
- Matthew Egan, Australian Rules footballer
- Maureen Egan, American writer and director of music videos and films
- Maurice Francis Egan, American writer and diplomat
- Michael Egan (disambiguation), several people
- Orla Egan, Irish LGBTQ+ activist, educator, filmmaker and historian
- Peter Egan British actor
- Philip Egan (born 1955), Bishop of Portsmouth
- Pierce Egan, journalist
- Richard Egan (disambiguation), several people
- Robert Egan, American restaurateur
- Robert J. Egan (Illinois politician), American judge and politician
- Robert J. Egan (Michigan politician), American politician
- Robert Shaw Egan (born 1945), American botanist and lichenologist
- Roma Egan, ballet dancer
- Rusty Egan, drummer
- Seamus Egan, musician
- Sean Egan, computer software developer
- Susan Egan, American actress
- Ted Egan, Australian folk musician and Administrator of the Northern Territory
- Thomas C. Egan (1894–1961), US federal judge
- Thomas J. Egan (1842–1914), Welsh-Canadian merchant, gunsmith, taxidermist, and naturalist
- Timothy Egan, writer
- Walter Egan (born 1948), American musician
- Walter Egan (golfer), golfer
- William Egan (disambiguation), several people
- Willie Egan (1933–2004), American musician

== See also ==
- Egan (disambiguation)
- Eagan (disambiguation)
