= Eggan =

Eggan is a surname. Notable people with the surname include:

- Dorothy Way Eggan (1901–1965), American anthropologist
- Fred Eggan (1906–1991), American anthropologist, husband of Dorothy
- Kevin Eggan (born 1974), American biologist

== See also ==
- Egan (surname)
