= Aed mac Conchbair Mac Aodhagáin =

Aed mac Conchbair Mac Aodhagáin (1330–1359) was an Irish bard.

Mac Aodhagáin was a member of a bardic family who originated from Park, in north County Galway. He was a scribe and based in Dún Daighre, (Duniry), County Galway, and was an ollamh in law for the Clanricarde. His genealogy was Aed mac Conchbair mac Gilla na Naem mic Duinn Sleibhe Mac Aodhagáin .

He is notable for, along with John Clyn (fl. 1332–1349), one of the few Irish chroniclers to leave a personal note of the Black Death. A marginal note in the book states:

"One thousand three hundred and fifty years from the birth of Christ to this night and this is the second year since the coming of the plague to Ireland. I have written this in the twentieth year of my age. I am Aed mac Conchbair Mac Aodhagáin and whoever reads it let him offer a prayer for my soul. This is Christmas night. On this night I place myself under the protection of the king of Heaven and Earth, beseeching that he will bring me and my friends safe through this plague and restore us once more to joy and gladness. Aed mac Conchbair Mac Aodhagáin who wrote this in the year of the great plague."

Beneath the above note is a second, dated a year later, Christmas night 1351:

"It is just a year tonight since I wroter the lines on the margin below and if it be God's will, may I reach the anniversary of this night many times, amen."

He is believed to have attended the great poetic festival held in 1351:

"at Christmas by William, the son of Donough Muimhneach O'Kelly, to the learned of Ireland, travellers, the poor and the indigent, and they were all served to their satisfaction, both good and bad, noble and ignoble, so that they were all thankful to him and his son, Melaghlin."

Aed died in 1359, and was noted as "the best of the Brehons of Ireland."

== See also ==
- Redwood Castle
- Baothghalach Mór Mac Aodhagáin (1550–1600), poet.
- Boetius Egan (archbishop of Tuam) (1734–1798), Roman Catholic prelate.
- John Egan (Canadian politician) (1811–1857), businessman and politician.
