= John Egan =

John Egan may refer to:

== Sports ==
- John Egan (basketball), basketball player who participated on Loyola University Chicago's 1963 championship team
- John Egan (Dublin GAA) (1951–2007), former Dublin GAA County Chairman
- John Egan (footballer, born 1937), Scottish footballer
- John Egan (footballer, born 1992), Irish footballer
- John Egan (Gaelic footballer) (1952–2012), Kerry player
- John Egan (hurler) (active since 2010), Irish hurler and Gaelic footballer
- John J. Egan (1878–1949), American college football head coach
- Rip Egan (John Joseph Egan, 1871–1950), baseball player, umpire and manager
- Johnny Egan (Australian footballer) (1898–1988), Australian footballer
- Johnny Egan (basketball) (1939–2022), American basketball player and coach
- Johnny Egan (Offaly Gaelic footballer)

== Others ==
- John Egan (Canadian politician) (1811–1857), Canadian businessman and politician
- John Egan (chairman) (1750–1810), Irish barrister, politician, and chairman of Kilmainham, County Dublin
- John Egan (CPR) (active 1882–1886), General Superintendent during the completion of the Canadian Pacific Railway
- John Egan (harp maker) (active 1804–1838), Irish musical instrument maker
- Sir John Egan (industrialist) (born 1939), British industrialist
- John Egan (piper) (1840–1897), left-handed Irish piper
- John Egan (Wisconsin politician) (1876–1942), American politician
- John C. Egan (1915–1961), U.S. Air Force pilot during World War II and Korea
- John Joseph Egan (1916–2001), American Roman Catholic priest and social activist
- John Treacy Egan (born 1962), American actor and singer
