= Gilla na Naemh Mac Aodhagáin =

Professor of Judiciary

Gilla na Naemh Mac Aodhagáin (died 1399) was Professor of Judiciary.

Gilla na Naemh was a member of a family - Mac Aodhagáin - originally from what is now County Galway but who had spread to many parts of Ireland by the end of the 14th century in response to the demand for their services as Brehons.

Under the year 1399, the Annals of Lough Ce notes his death, describing him as the ollamh of the East of Mumha (Ormond) in judicature. It was probably within his lifetime that the family first established itself in Ormond, Redwood Castle in what is now County Tipperary being given to the family in the late 14th century.
