= Jim Egan =

Jim Egan may refer to:

- Jim Egan (baseball) (1858–1884), American baseball player
- Jim Egan (activist) (1921–2000), Canadian LGBT rights activist

== See also ==
- James Egan (disambiguation)
