= John Egan (piper) =

Irish piper (1840-1897)

John Egan (1840–1897) was an Irish piper.

Egan, known as The Albino piper was a native of Dunmore, County Galway. Like his countryman Patsy Touhey, he was lefthanded. His tutor in pipe music was Liam Dáll Connolly, and his grandson, John Burke (piper).

He emigrated to the United States and spent much of his subsequent life in New York City, barring tours with John Cronan and Patsy Touhey across eastern states.

Francis O'Neill preserves a comment by Nicholas Burke on Egan, who stated that Egan "was a grand player and very powerful in his music."

Egan died in New York in 1897.
