= Ryan Kelly (singer) =

Northern Irish singer (born 1978)

Ryan John Kelly
- Born: November 6, 1978 (age 47); The Moy, Northern Ireland
- Occupation: Singer
- Known for: Celtic Thunder

Ryan John Kelly (born November 6, 1978) is a Northern Irish singer known for being a part of the group Celtic Thunder. He has also released solo albums as well as in collaboration with Neil Byrne.

== Early life and education ==
Born on 6 November 1978, Ryan John Kelly is from a village called The Moy, County Tyrone, Northern Ireland. He is the youngest of three children (two boys and a girl). Kelly earned two degrees from the Queen's University Belfast, being a Bachelor of Science in Accounting and a Graduate Diploma in Advanced Accounting.

== Career ==
When he was seven, Kelly started to sing publicly. He has always had a deep passion for music and theater.

Kelly is a current member of the Irish band Celtic Thunder, but he maintains his early musical background a solo singer. His first solo album, released in 2010 is called In Time; his second, "Life", was released in 2013. With fellow Celtic Thunder singer and band member Neil Byrne, the duo have released three albums - Acoustically Irish, in 2013, and Byrne and Kelly: Live in Australia, in 2014; and Echoes in 2016

== Discography ==
Solo

- In Time (2010)
- Life (2013)

With Neil Byrne

- Acoustically Irish (2013)
- Byrne and Kelly: Live in Australia (2014)
- Echoes (2016)
- The Ballads Collection (2020)
