= Keith Harkin =

Irish singer-songwriter (born 1986)

- Born: Keith Harkin; 10 June 1986 (age 40); Derry, Northern Ireland
- Occupations: Singer; Songwriter; Musician
- Instruments: Vocals; Guitar; Mandolin; Piano; Banjo; Ukulele
- Years active: 2006–present
- Label: Blue Elan
- Spouse: Kelsey Harkin (m. 2016)
- Website: keithharkin.com

Keith Harkin (born 10 June 1986) is an Irish singer-songwriter and former member of the Irish singing group Celtic Thunder.

== Musical career ==
Harkin is a singer-songwriter who plays guitar, mandolin, banjo, ukulele, and piano.

In 2005, he travelled to London to record with a producer named Andy Wright, and played in various venues and festivals throughout England, including the Tavistock Festival on Portobello Road.

In 2006, he played the lead role in Dha Theanga, an Irish program on BBC TV. He also rewrote and arranged the music for the show. Harkin was invited to support John Martyn and David Kitt on their Irish tours and BBC Radio Ulster called him the "Irish Jack Johnson."

Harkin was part of the band Celtic Thunder, which performed in the United States, Canada, and Australia. Celtic Thunder had two #1 selling DVDs and three #1 selling albums on the World Billboard charts. Harkin began working with the band in 2007 and wrote "Lauren and I" for the band.

After nearly ten years with the group, he decided to take time off and tour independently. Harkin has now recorded more original songs including: "How I Wish", "Daisy Fields," "Vanity", "September Sessions", and "All Day Long".

Harkin's self-titled solo album was released in Canada on 4th September 2012 and in the United States on 18th September 2012. The album was released with Verve Records, to which he was signed by Grammy Award-winning producer David Foster. It reached the No. 8 spot in Amazon's Pop Music Charts and the #1 spot in Amazon's International charts two months before its release date. The album features a duet with two-time Grammy Award winner Colbie Caillat, a cover of Van Morrison's "Have I Told You Lately".

Harkin's second solo album, Mercy Street, was released in October 2015. The songs on the album were written by Harkin and the album was self-funded. Harkin recorded all the songs on the album live in one take. Mercy Street reached number one on the World Music Billboard charts.

Harkin released a solo Christmas album titled Nollaig in 2016 which also reached number one on World Music Billboard charts. It was produced by Brian Byrne and recorded at his home studio. The album contains a mix of original and traditional songs, and features the Bulgarian Symphony Orchestra on several tracks.

Harkin's eighth studio album, Man of Many Hearts, was released in the fall of 2022.

== Personal life ==
Harkin was born in Derry, Northern Ireland. He now resides in Portugal with his wife and son.

== Discography ==
Keith Harkin Debut Album (Sept 2012)

- "End of the Innocence"
- "Daisy Fields"
- "Have I Told You Lately"
- "Everybody's Talkin'"
- "Nothing But You and I"
- "Here Comes The Sun"
- "Tears of Hercules"
- "Orange Moon"
- "Take It Away"
- "Don't Forget About Me"
- "Rosa"
- "Heart of Saturday Night"

Mercy Street (March 2016)

- "Mercy"
- "I Remember It All"
- "Take Me Down"
- "September Sessions"
- "Wait on Me"
- "First Time"
- "Lauren & I"
- "My Love Goes On"
- "Keep on Rolling"
- "Along The Road"
- "Risk The Fall"
- "Auld Lang Syne"

Nollaig (2016)

- "Driving Home For Christmas"
- "Merry Christmas You've Been on My Mind"
- "The River"
- "Arthur McBride"
- "In The Bleak Mid Winter"
- "Have Yourself A Merry Little Christmas"
- "2000 Miles"
- "God Rest Ye Merry Gentlemen"
- "No Love Dyring"
- "Silent Night"
- "Auld Lang Syne"

In The Round (2017)

- "Lauren & I"
- "I Remember it all"
- "Along The Road"
- "Take Me Down"
- "First Time"
- "Whiskey in the Jar"
- "Risk The Fall"
- "Mercy"
- "Ring Tailed Rat"
- "Carefree Heart"
- "My Love Goes On"
- "September Sessions"
- "Keep on Rolling"
- "Wait ON Me"

Ten Years Later" (2019)

- "When We Go Out"
- "How I Wish"
- "Daisy Fields"
- "All Day Long"
- "Going to San Diego"
- "Small Town Girl"
- "Banjo Song"
- "Looking Glass"
- "Going Home"
- "She's Almost"
- "Calling Baton Rouge"

It's Christmas Time (2019)

- "Merry of May"
- "First of May"
- "My Old Friend"
- "I Say Mommy Kissing Santa Claus"
- "Silent Night"
- "Its Christmas Time"
- "Jingle Bells"

Santa Please Come Home (2021)

- "The River"
- "Can't Help Falling in Love with You"
- "Santa Please Come Home"
- "Oh Holy Night"
- "Halleluja"
- "Have Yourself A Merry Little Christmas"

Man of Many Hats (2022)

- "Whats Her Name"
- "Life"
- "When We Go Out"
- "Every Little Kiss"
- "Hold On"
- "Call Me In The Morning*
- "There She Goes"
- "Beeswing"
- "We Have Found Love"
- "Ring Tailed Rat"

A Proper St. Patrick's Day (2024)

- "Beeswing"
- "The Lakes of Pontchartrain"
- "Caledonia"
- "Homes of Donegal"
- "Fishermans Blues"
- "Grace"
- "Rockin' McLaughlin"
- "Easter Snow & The Merry Blacksmith"
- "The Dutchman"
- "Tupelo Honey"
- "Whiskey in the Jar"
- "This Old House"
- "Turning Away"

A Cosy Christmas (2024)

- "My Old Friend"
- "First Of May"
- "Santa Please Come Home"
- "Silent Night"
- "Raise Another Glass"
- "Can't Help Falling in Love"
- "Hallelujah"
- "Have Yourself A Merry Little Christmas"
- "The River"

A Proper St. Patrick's Day Vol. 2 (2025)

- "Amazing Grace"
- "The Island"
- "Galway Girl"
- "Maid of Culmore"
- "Black is the Color"
- "Tears of Hercules"
- "Ride On"
- "Miss Monaghans Lazy Lover"
- "The Connemara Cradle Song"

=== Solo singles ===
- "Daisy Fields" (Keith Harkin, 2012)
- "September Sessions" (Mercy Street, 2015)
- "Mercy" (Mercy Street, 2015)
- "Don't Forget About Me" (Keith Harkin, 2012)
- "Nothing But You & I" (Keith Harkin, 2012)
