= Sephira =

Irish classical / traditional violin duo

Sephira – The Irish Rock Violinists
- Origin: Carrickmacross, Ireland
- Genres: Classical crossover Celtic; Instrumental rock
- Years active: 2006–present
- Label: Cicero Records
- Members: Joyce O'Leary; Ruth O'Leary
- Website: www.sephira.ie

Sephira, also known as Sephira – The Irish Rock Violinists, are an Irish band consisting of sisters Joyce and Ruth O'Leary, who both play the violin and provide vocals.

They released their debut album Believe in 2006. Its style is classical crossover with traditional Irish influences.

== Early life and education ==
The sisters are from Carrickmacross, County Monaghan, Ireland.

They started studying violin in early childhood: Joyce at two years of age and a half and Ruth at six. Joyce performed in the National Concert Hall, Dublin aged just three, playing a Bach minuet. She was named Ireland's Most Promising Violinist when she was nine.

Ruth studied music performance at London's Guildhall School of Music to study for a BA in Music Performance. She continued her studies in Dublin, where she received a first-class honours B.A. with a performance of Mendelssohn's Violin Concerto at the National Concert Hall, Dublin. During her years of study, Ruth performed with acts such as Rodrigo y Gabriela and featured on their Live in Manchester and Dublin album.

== Performances ==
Sephira toured the US with the PBS show Celtic Thunder between 2008 and 2010. They have also played with Enya, Andrea Bocelli, Kanye West and Michael Buble.

Specializing in theater shows, corporate events, and private events, they have performed at private events for Prince Albert of Monaco, the late Larry Hagman, Priscilla Presley, Linda Gray and the women of Congress in Washington, D.C. They have also performed for other dignitaries including a US president, US vice president, US Secretary of Homeland Security, and the US National Coast Guard Foundation.

== Personal lives ==
In 2014 the sisters spoke out about their health issues with hemochromatosis and autoimmune disorders, urging other people to get checked for these conditions.

== Background to albums ==
- "Believe" (2006). The album was recorded in The Cauldron Studios, Dublin, and was produced by producer and instrumentalist Bill Shanley. Other musicians featured on the album include Ruby Ashley, William Butt, Noel Eccles, Karen Hamill, and former band member Colm Henry.
- "Sephira" (2008) released for the US market. This was a mix of "Believe" favourites and the 2008 EP "Love of my Life".
- "Starlight" (2011) was a Christmas album.
- "Eternity" (2012). This EP was dedicated to their late friend and mentor, Larry Hagman.
- "Sephira Believe Limited Edition" (2016) This album was released for the 10th anniversary of Sephira's debut album, Believe.

Sephira discography
- Studio albums: 3
- EPs: 2
- Singles: 2
- Music videos: 5

Irish Rock Violinists and sister duo Sephira have released three studio albums, two EPs, one single, and three music videos.

== Discography ==
=== Studio albums ===
List of studio albums with release date, label, formats, and track listings
Title	Release Date	Label	Formats	Songs
Believe	1 March 2006	Cicero Records	CD, digital download, stream	1. Dreams; 2. If; 4. Shine On; 5. Time; 6. Tears; 7. Sunrise; 8. Angel; 9. Reflections; 10. My World; 11. Haunted; 12. Far & Away
Sephira	November 2008	Cicero Records	CD	
Starlight	6 November 2011	Cicero Records	CD, digital download, stream	1. Have Yourself a Merry Little Christmas; 2. Carol of the Bells; 3. Jesu Joy; 4. Walking in the Air; 5. O Holy Night; 6. Sleigh Ride; 7. Believe; 8. Hallelujah; 9. Beneath a Thousand Stars; 10. Silent Night (Oíche Chiúin)
Sephira Believe Limited Edition	March 2016	Cicero Records	CD	1. Dreams; 2. If; 4. Shine On; 5. Time; 6. Tears; 7. Sunrise; 8. Angel; 9. Reflections; 10. My World; 11. Haunted; 12. Far & Away; Bonus Track: Love of my Life

=== Extended plays (EPs) ===
List of extended plays, with release date, label, formats, and track listings
Title	Release Date	Label	Formats	Songs
Love of My Life	September 15 2008	Cicero Records	CD	1. Love of My Life; 2. El Tango de Roxanne / Libertango (Live in Liverpool); 3. Come Home to Me (Live in Liverpool)
Eternity	April 9 2013	Cicero Records	CD, digital download	1. See Me Now / Danse Macabre; 2. To Love You More; 3. Palladio; 4. Hallelujah; 5. Misirlou; Bonus Track: Miracle (only available on CD)

=== Singles ===
List of singles, with release date, label, and formats
Title	Release Date	Label	Formats
Pirates of the Caribbean	13 November 2020	Cicero Records	Digital download, stream
Haunting 4SuMotion & Sephira	13 February 2023	Affiliate	stream

=== Music videos ===
List of music videos, with release date
Title	Release Date
Love of my Life	August 2007
Hallelujah	October 2014
Pirates of the Caribbean	December 2020
Angel	28 July 2021
Despacito	27 August 2021
