= Dorothy Way Eggan =

American anthropologist

Dorothy Way Eggan (1901–1965) was an American anthropologist noted for her research among the Hopi tribe.

Eggan was born October 31, 1901, in Dover Hill, Indiana. During her first marriage, to Jean C. Harrington, she lived in Santa Fe, New Mexico and became acquainted with the Pueblo peoples. Her interest in anthropology was confirmed when Harrington entered the University of Chicago as a graduate student in archaeology. She became a secretary in the Department of Anthropology there and befriended the anthropologists Robert Redfield and A. R. Radcliffe-Brown.

She divorced Harrington and married Fred Eggan, an anthropologist at Chicago, in 1939 and spent the following summer doing fieldwork with the Hopi in Arizona. Her interests included dreams and psychoanalysis with respect to Hopi culture. She also became associated with the Chicago Institute for Psychoanalysis.

While suffering from rheumatic fever she wrote a series of papers on the importance of dreams in anthropology and social science. She died in July 1965.

== Works ==
- (1943) "The General Problem of Hopi Adjustment." American Anthropologist, pp. 731.
- (1949) "The Significance of Dreams for Anthropological Research." American Anthropologist, vol. 51, pp. 177–198.
- (1952) "The Manifest Content of Dreams: A Challenge to Social Science." American Anthropologist, vol. 54, pp. 469–485.
- (1961) "Dream Analysis." In Studying Personality Cross-Culturally, ed. by Bert Kaplan. Evanston: Illinois: Row, Peterson & Co.
- (1966) "Hopi Dreams in Cultural Perspective." In The Dream and Human Societies, ed. by G. von Grunebaum. Berkeley: University of California Press.
