= Alfred Radcliffe-Brown =

British social anthropologist (1881–1955)

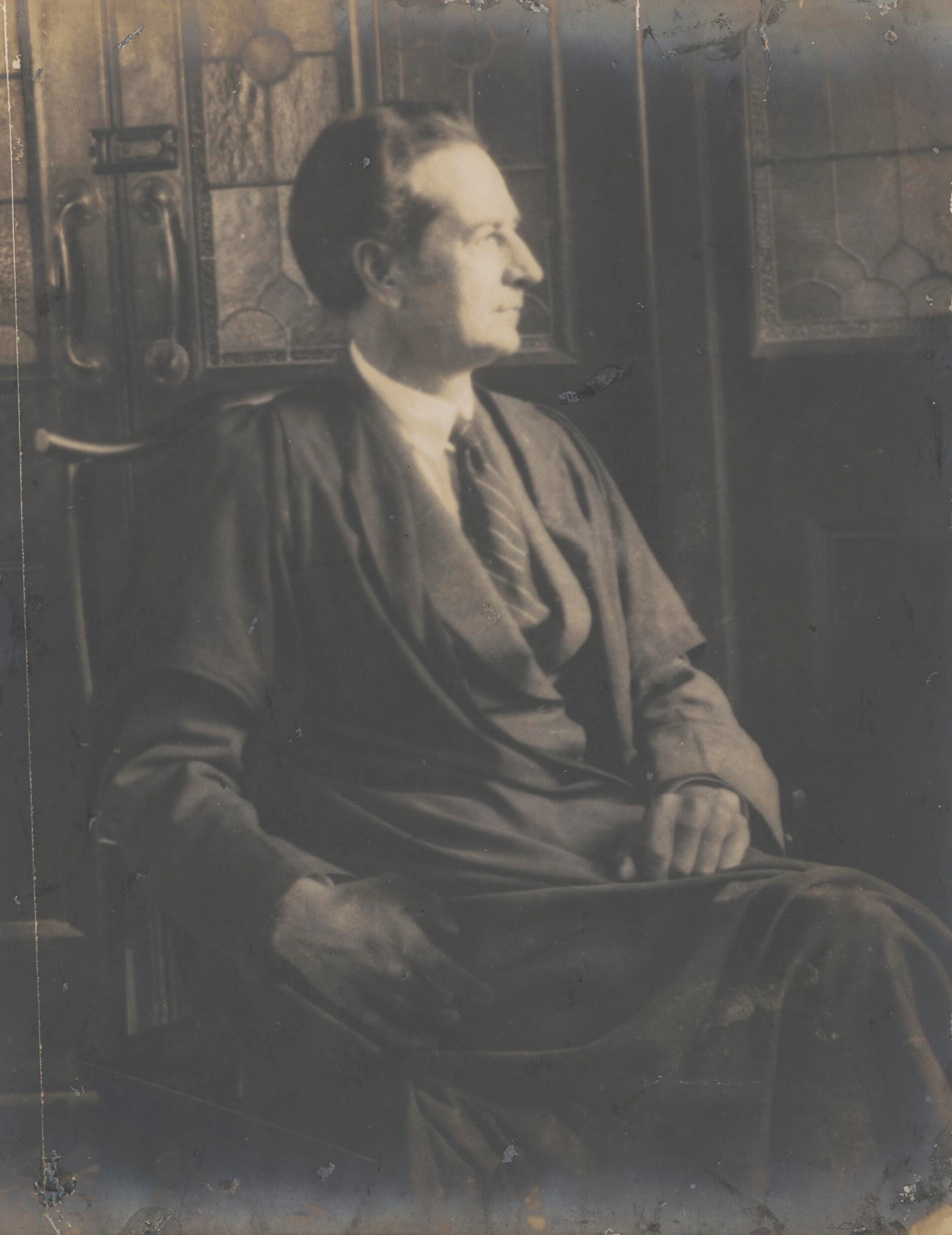
- Born: Alfred Reginald Brown; 17 January 1881; Birmingham, England
- Died: 24 October 1955 (aged 74); London, England
- Scientific career
- Fields: Social anthropology

Alfred Reginald Radcliffe-Brown FBA (né Brown; 17 January 1881 – 24 October 1955) was an English social anthropologist who helped develop the theory of structural functionalism. He performed fieldwork in the Andaman Islands and Western Australia, which became the basis of his later books. He had academic appointments at universities in Cape Town, Sydney, Chicago, and Oxford, and sought to model the topic of anthropology after the natural sciences.

== Biography ==
Alfred Reginald Radcliffe-Brown was born Alfred Reginald Brown in Sparkbrook, Birmingham, England, the second son of Alfred Brown (d.1886), a manufacturer's clerk, and Hannah Brown (née Radcliffe). He later changed his surname, by deed poll, to Radcliffe-Brown, Radcliffe being his mother's maiden name. He was educated at King Edward's School, Birmingham, and Trinity College, Cambridge (B.A., 1905; M.A., 1909), graduating with first-class honours in the moral sciences tripos. At Trinity College, he was elected Anthony Wilkin student in 1906 and 1909. While still a student, he earned the nickname "Anarchy Brown" for his close interest in the writings of the anarcho-communist and scientist Peter Kropotkin.

Like other young men with blood in their veins, I wanted to do something to reform the world – to get rid of poverty and war, and so on. So I read Godwin, Proudhon, Marx and innumerable others. Kropotkin, revolutionary, but still a scientist, pointed out how important for any attempt to improve society was a scientific understanding of it.

He was taught psychology by W. H. R. Rivers who, with Alfred Cort Haddon, guided him toward social anthropology. With the latter's influence, he travelled to the Andaman Islands (1906–1908) and Western Australia (1910–1912, with biologist and writer E. L. Grant Watson and Australian writer Daisy Bates) to perform fieldwork concerning the workings of the societies there.

His time in the Andaman Islands and Western Australia were the basis of his later books The Andaman Islanders (1922) and The Social Organization of Australian Tribes (1930). At the 1914 meeting of the British Association for the Advancement of Science, in Melbourne, Bates accused him of plagiarising her work, based on an unpublished manuscript she had sent him for comment.

Before departing for Western Australia, Brown married Winifred Marie Lyon in Cambridge; they had one daughter, Mary Cynthia Lyon Radcliffe. The couple became estranged by about 1926. They may have divorced in 1938 (sources disagree on whether a divorce was completed).

In 1916 Brown became a director of education in Tonga. In 1921 he relocated to Cape Town to become professor of social anthropology, initiating the School of African Life. Further university appointments were University of Cape Town (1921–1925), University of Sydney (1925–1931) and University of Chicago (1931–1937). Among his most prominent students during his years at the University of Chicago were Sol Tax and Fred Eggan.

While at the University of Sydney, he was a cultivator of the arts, and championed Edward de Vere, 17th Earl of Oxford as the author of the works attributed to Shakespeare. Fearing that the Depression would result in financial collapse, Radcliffe-Brown departed in 1931 for a professorship with the University of Chicago, leaving his successors to solicit Rockefeller grants and government funds to save the Sydney Department.

After these various far-flung appointments, he returned to England in 1937 to begin an appointment to the first chair in social anthropology at Oxford University in 1937. He had this post until his retirement in 1946. Survived by his daughter, he died in London in 1955 at the age of 74.

While Radcliffe-Brown founded the Institute of Social and Cultural Anthropology at Oxford, according to Rodney Needham his absence from the institute during the war years prevented his theories and method from having a major influence on Oxford anthropology.

== Influences ==
Radcliffe-Brown was influenced by his tutor, W. W. Rouse Ball, to study a moral science (psychology, philosophical subjects, and economics) instead of a natural science which he originally wanted to choose. During his time at Cambridge, professors Haddon and Rivers encouraged him to study anthropology and discover his interests in the topic. Haddon guided him towards the comparative method in specific societies in anthropology, classification and morphology, inductive generalization, and to sympathize with Durkheim's methods.

== Work ==
He has been described as "the classic to Bronisław Malinowski's romantic". Radcliffe-Brown brought French sociology (namely Émile Durkheim) to British anthropology, constructing a rigorous battery of concepts to frame ethnography.

Durkheim inspired Radcliffe-Brown throughout the entirety of his profession in anthropology. One of Radcliffe-Brown's goals was to "transform anthropology into a 'real' science based on the natural sciences". He demonstrated these ideologies in his book published in 1957, A Natural Science of Society.

In 1906, one of Alfred's primary studies concerned the kinship and familial relations of Western Australians. Within these communities, he discerned distinct social organizations that proved that adaptation and fusion were essential in keeping the system functioning. The term "Structural Functionalism" would later be used to describe the idea that "the life of a society may be viewed as an active system of functionally consistent, interdependent elements".

=== Concept of function ===
Radcliffe-Brown has often been associated with functionalism, and is considered by some to be the founder of structural functionalism. Structural Functionalism, which can be traced back to sociologist Émile Durkheim, is the social theory that assumes societal institution (e.g. Government, school systems, family structures, etc.) play a role in its success. Through the two different group dynamics; Mechanical solidarity a "sentimental attraction of social units or groups that perform the same or similar functions" & Organic solidarity, which is relies on "interdependence based on differentiated functions and specialization", a society creates a web that allows a cohesive existence of heterogenous groups. Alfred developed these principles believing that studying social structures like kinship ties would be evidence enough for understanding how social structures affect the maintenance of a society, stating, "human beings are connected by a complex network of social relations. I use the term "social structure" to denote this network of actually existing relations". (On Social Structure, 190) He also clarifies that "We may define it as a condition in which all parts of the system work together with a sufficient degree of harmony or internal consistency, i.e., without producing persistent conflicts which can neither be resolved nor regulated". (On the Concept of Function in Social Science, 181). Nonetheless, Radcliffe-Brown vehemently denied being a functionalist, and carefully distinguished his concept of function from that of Malinowski, who openly advocated functionalism. While Malinowski's functionalism claimed that social practices could be explained directly by their ability to satisfy basic biological needs, Radcliffe-Brown rejected this as baseless. Instead, influenced by the process philosophy of Alfred North Whitehead, he claimed that the fundamental units of anthropology were processes of human life and interaction. Because these are by definition characterized by constant flux, what needs explaining is the occurrence of stability. Why Radcliffe-Brown asked, would some patterns of social practices repeat themselves and even seem to become fixed? He reasoned that this would at least require that other practices must not conflict with them too much; and that in some cases, it may be that practices grow to reinforce each other, a notion he termed 'coadaptation', deriving from the biological term. Functional analysis, then, was just the attempt to explain stability by discovering how practices fit together to sustain that stability; the 'function' of practice was just its role in sustaining the overall social structure, insofar as there was a stable social structure (Radcliffe-Brown 1957).

Malinowski has explained that he is the inventor of functionalism, to which he gave its name. His definition of it is clear; it is the theory or doctrine that every feature of culture of any people past or present is to be explained by reference to seven biological needs of individual human beings. I cannot speak for the other writers to whom the label functionalist is applied by the authors, though I very much doubt if Redfield or Linton accept this doctrine. As for myself I reject it entirely, regarding it as useless and worse. As a consistent opponent of Malinowski's functionalism I may be called an anti-functionalist.

=== Concept of social structure ===
While Lévi-Strauss (1958) claimed that social structure and the social relations that are its constituents are theoretical constructions used to model social life, Radcliffe-Brown only half-agreed:

to say we are studying social structures is not exactly the same thing as saying that we study social relations, which is how some sociologists define their subject. A particular social relation between two persons (unless they be Adam and Eve in the Garden of Eden) exists only as part of a wide network of social relations, involving many other persons, and it is this network which I regard as the object of our investigations.

I am aware, of course, that the term "social structure" is used in a number of different senses, some of them very vague. This is unfortunately true of many other terms commonly used by anthropologists. The choice of terms and their definitions is a matter of scientific convenience, but one of the characteristics of a science as soon as it has passed the first formative period is the existence of technical terms which are used in the same precise meaning by all the students of that science. By this test, I regret to say, social anthropology reveals itself as not yet a formed science.

In addition to identifying abstract relationships between social structures, Radcliffe-Brown argued for the importance of the notion of a 'total social structure', which is the sum total of social relations in a given social unit of analysis during a given period. The identification of 'functions' of social practices was supposed to be relative to this total social structure. Lévi-Strauss considered social structure as a model.

Radcliffe-Brown's research emphasized simple, non-literate societies. He believed kinship played a large role in these societies, and that patrilineages, clans, tribes and units all relate to kinship rules in society and are essential in political organization. Radcliffe-Brown claimed that all research on social structure is based on observations, what anthropologists see and hear about individual peoples.

Radcliffe-Brown also argued that the study of social structure encompassed culture, therefore there is no need for a separate topic dedicated to culture.

=== Evolutionism, diffusionism, and the role of social anthropology ===
A major opinion concerning tribal societies had been that all societies follow a unilineal cultural sequence ('evolutionism'), and that therefore 'primitive' societies could be understood as earlier stages of that sequence; conversely, 'modern' societies contained vestiges of older forms. Another opinion was that social practices tend to develop only once, and that therefore commonalities and differences between societies could be explained by a historical reconstruction of the interaction between societies ('diffusionism'). According to both of these opinions, the proper way to explain differences between tribal societies and modern ones was historical reconstruction.

Radcliffe-Brown rejected both of these opinions because of the untestable nature of historical reconstructions. Instead, he argued for the use of the comparative method to find regularities in human societies and thereby build a genuinely scientific knowledge of social life.

For social anthropology the task is to formulate and validate statements about the conditions of existence of social systems (laws of social statics) and the regularities that are observable in social change (laws of social dynamics). This can only be done by the systematic use of the comparative method, and the only justification of that method is the expectation that it will provide us with results of this kind, or, as Boas stated it, will provide us with knowledge of the laws of social development. It will be only in an integrated and organised study in which historical studies and sociological studies are combined that we shall be able to reach a real understanding of the development of human society

To that end, Radcliffe-Brown argued for a 'natural science of society'. He claimed that there was an independent role for social anthropology in that respect, separate from psychology, though not in conflict with it. This was because psychology was to be the study of individual mental processes, while social anthropology was to study processes of interaction between people (social relations). Thus he argued for a principled ontological distinction between psychology and social anthropology, in the same way as one might try to make a principled distinction between physics and biology. Moreover, he claimed that existing social scientific disciplines, with the possible exception of linguistics, were arbitrary; once our knowledge of society is sufficient, he argued, we will be able to form subdisciplines of anthropology concerning relatively isolated parts of the social structure. But without extensive scientific knowledge, it is impossible to know where the boundaries should be defined.

Radcliffe-Brown was often criticised for failing to consider the effect of historical changes in the societies he studied, in particular changes brought about by colonialism. Nevertheless, he is now considered, along with Bronisław Malinowski, as one of the founders of modern social anthropology.

=== Ethnography ===
Radcliffe-Brown performed extensive fieldwork in the Andaman Islands, Australia, and elsewhere. On the basis of this research, he contributed extensively to the anthropological ideas concerning kinship, and criticised Lévi-Strauss's Alliance theory. He also produced structural analyses of myths, including on the basis of the concept of binary distinctions and dialectical opposition, an idea later echoed by Lévi-Strauss.

=== Opinions concerning religion ===
According to Radcliffe-Brown, the function of religion is to install a sense of dependence on fear and other emotional strain on the human body into a society. Therefore, a major function of religion is to affirm and strengthen sentiments necessary for a society to continue. This idea was developed in Radcliffe-Browns book, The Andaman Islanders (Free Press 1963).

== Selected publications ==
- 1912, "The Distribution of Native Tribes in Part of Western Australia", Man, 12: 143–146.
- 1913, "Three Tribes of Western Australia", The Journal of the Royal Anthropological Institute of Great Britain and Ireland, 43: 143–194.
- 1922, The Andaman Islanders; a study in social anthropology.
- 1926, 'Arrangements of Stones in Australia', Man, 26: 204–205.
- 1931, Social Organization of Australian Tribes.
- Radcliffe-Brown, A. R. (July 1940). "On Joking Relationships". Journal of the International African Institute. 13 (3): 195–210. doi:10.2307/1156093. JSTOR 1156093. S2CID 11011777.
- 1957, A Natural Science of Society: based on a series of lectures at the University of Chicago in 1937 and posthumously published by his students
- Radcliffe-Brown, A. R. (1952). Structure and Function in Primitive Society: Essays and Addresses. Glencoe, Illinois: Free Press.
