= Celtic Thunder =

Irish band

- Origin: Ireland
- Genres: Folk; adult contemporary; world music; soft rock; Broadway; classical crossover
- Years active: 2007–present
- Labels: Decca, Verve, Legacy
- Members: Neil Byrne; Emmet Cahill; Damian McGinty; Ronan Scolard
- Past members: Paul Byrom; George Donaldson†; Daniel Furlong; Keith Harkin; Colm Keegan; Ryan Kelly; Michael O'Dwyer; Emmett O'Hanlon
- Website: Official website

Celtic Thunder is an Irish singing group and stage show known for its eclectic, theatrical style show. The group is backed by the Celtic Thunder Band on their concert tours, and their live shows are known for the use of dramatic set pieces (often invoking symbols of ancient Celtic mythology), visual effects, and highly choreographed staging.

Since the original group's formation in 2007, Celtic Thunder has released twelve albums as well as ten live performances on DVD, three of which were split into two releases.

== History ==
Celtic Thunder was conceived in the mind of producer Sharon Browne (Celtic Collections) who started the group in 2007. Celtic Thunder debuted in August 2007 at The Helix in Dublin, Ireland. They are accompanied by the Celtic Concert Orchestra under the direction of Phil Coulter, the musical director of the group.

In December 2008, 2009 and 2011, Billboard magazine named Celtic Thunder Top World Album Artist. Their first three albums also placed in the top 10 for World Albums.

In March 2009, Celtic Thunder opened the Saint Patrick's Day Parade in New York City.

On 28 November 2010, Celtic Thunder member Paul Byrom announced his resignation from the group to begin a solo career. He left the group when the 2010 concert tour was over.

In 2011, Damian McGinty (the group's youngest member) entered and won the Oxygen reality show The Glee Project. On 21 August 2011, McGinty announced on The Glee Project's Live Viewing Party, that he would be stepping down from Celtic Thunder due to his new role on Glee. McGinty returned to the group in 2015, and has been on their subsequent albums.

George Donaldson died of a heart attack on 12 March 2014 in his home in Glasgow.

== Members ==
=== Current members ===
- Neil Byrne
- Emmet Cahill
- Damian McGinty
- Ronan Scolard

=== Past members ===
- Paul Byrom
- George Donaldson (died 2014)
- Daniel Furlong
- Keith Harkin
- Colm Keegan
- Ryan Kelly
- Michael O'Dwyer
- Emmett O'Hanlon

=== Band ===
Current Members:

- Seamus Brett – keyboards, piano, assistant musical director
- Daniel Thompson – keyboards
- Kate Knudsvig – violin
- Meabh O’Donnell - pipes, whistles
- AJ Fullerton – guitars
- Forrest Raup – drums

Past Members:

- Muireann Ní She – pipes, whistles
- Tim Philpott - bass
- Alex Goldberg – bass
- Peter Sheridan – keyboards
- David Bakey - guitars
- Conal Early – guitars
- Seána Davey – harp, concertina
- Charlie Foley – bass
- Nicole Hudson – violin
- Laura Durrant – cello
- Ruth O'Leary (Sephira) – violin
- Joyce O'Leary (Sephira) – violin
- David Munro – piano, musical director
- Barry Kerr – pipes, whistles, bodhran, mandolin
- Declan O'Donoghue – percussion

=== Creative team ===
- Mark Jones – production director
- Ronan Scolard – music director
- Stuart McInnes – front-of-house audio engineer
- Thomas Gray - monitor engineer
- Jean Clancy – marketing manager
- Declan Browne – online merchandise manager
- Matthew Browne – tour merchandise manager

== Discography and videography ==
=== Studio albums ===
Title	Date of release	Media format	Featured soloists	Notes	Sales	Certifications
Celtic Thunder: The Show	18 March 2008	CD & DVD	Byrom, Donaldson, Harkin, Kelly, McGinty	Both 14-song and 28-song versions of the DVD have been released	US: 231,000	ARIA: 2× Platinum (DVD)
Celtic Thunder: Act Two	16 September 2008	CD	Byrom, Donaldson, Harkin, Kelly, McGinty		US: 193,000	
Celtic Thunder: Take Me Home	14 July 2009	CD & DVD	Byrom, Donaldson, Harkin, Kelly, McGinty			ARIA: Platinum (DVD)
Celtic Thunder: It's Entertainment!	9 February 2010	CD & DVD	Byrne, Byrom, Donaldson, Harkin, Kelly, McGinty			ARIA: 2× Platinum (DVD)
Celtic Thunder: Christmas	12 October 2010	CD & DVD	Byrne, Byrom, Donaldson, Harkin, Kelly, McGinty			ARIA: 2× Platinum (DVD)
Celtic Thunder: Heritage	22 February 2011	CD & DVD	Byrne, Byrom, Donaldson, Harkin, Kelly, McGinty			ARIA: Platinum (DVD)
Celtic Thunder: Storm	20 September 2011	CD & DVD	Byrne, Byrom, Donaldson, Harkin, Kelly, McGinty	Recorded in 2009		ARIA: Gold (DVD)
Celtic Thunder: Voyage	28 February 2012	CD & DVD	Byrne, Cahill, Furlong, Donaldson, Harkin, Kelly		US: 76,000	ARIA: Platinum (DVD)
Celtic Thunder: Voyage II	25 June 2012	CD & DVD	Byrne, Cahill, Furlong, Donaldson, Harkin, Kelly,	For online purchase only, re-released 2015 as New Voyage		
Celtic Thunder: Mythology	19 February 2013	CD & DVD	Byrne, Cahill, Donaldson, Harkin, Keegan, Kelly	Also available as 2 CD deluxe edition		ARIA: Platinum (DVD)
Celtic Thunder: Christmas Voices	11 October 2013	CD	Byrne, Cahill, Donaldson, Harkin, Keegan, Kelly	Re-released 2014 as Holiday Symphony, 2015 as The Classic Christmas Album		
The Very Best of Celtic Thunder	13 March 2015	CD	Byrne, Byrom, Cahill, Donaldson, Harkin, Keegan, Kelly, McGinty, O'Hanlon	Also features re-recorded tracks to include Keegan and O'Hanlon		
Celtic Thunder: Inspirational	29 September 2017	CD	Byrne, Byrom, Cahill, Donaldson, Furlong, Harkin, Kelly, McGinty, O'Dwyer	Features new tracks recorded May 2017 and a few old tracks		
Celtic Thunder X	2 March 2018	CD & DVD	Byrne, Cahill, Kelly, McGinty, O’Dwyer	A new show for 2018 to celebrate 10 Years of Celtic Thunder		
Celtic Thunder: Homeland	12 March 2021	CD & DVD	Byrne, Cahill, Donaldson, Harkin, Keegan, Kelly, McGinty, O'Dwyer, O'Hanlon	A new album and show celebrating the Irish music from the past 10 years of Celtic Thunder		
Celtic Thunder: Odyssey	24 November 2023 (CD) & 30 April 2024 (DVD)	CD & DVD	Byrne, Cahill, Kelly (CD), McGinty, Scolard (DVD)	A new show for 2023		
Celtic Thunder: The Live Experience	22 November 2024	CD	Byrne, Cahill, McGinty, Scolard	A live recording of Celtic Thunder: Odyssey		

In 2015 Legacy re-released the whole Celtic Thunder back-catalogue, including re-releases of Celtic Thunder, Celtic Thunder: Act Two, Take Me Home, It's Entertainment!, Christmas (with new art work), Heritage, Storm, Voyage, New Voyage (originally entitled Voyage II), Mythology and The Classic Christmas Album (originally entitled Holiday Symphony). Some of the songs originally sung by Paul Byrom got re-recorded by Emmett O'Hanlon or Colm Keegan. All tracklists were revised.

=== Compilations ===
Title	Date of release	Media format	Notes
Celtic Thunder: Ireland's Call	2010	CD	QVC bonus CD released along with It's Entertainment!; includes 5 tracks
Celtic Thunder: The Irish Collection	2011	CD	11-track compilation released along with Storm; includes 1 new recording
Celtic Thunder: Heartland	2012	CD plus DVD	15-track compilation
Celtic Thunder: Islands	2013	CD	12-track compilation released for Celtic Thunder Cruise 2013; includes 2 new recordings
Celtic Thunder: Home	2013	DVD	includes fan favourites from previous DVDs
Celtic Thunder: Myths & Legends	25 October 2013	CD plus DVD	Australian exclusive package; behind the scenes DVD plus 14-track CD Mythology leftovers
Celtic Thunder: My Land	18 April 2014	CD plus DVD	Australian exclusive package; documentary DVD plus 8-track CD including Mythology leftovers
George	2014	CD & DVD	16-track George Donaldson tribute album
Celtic Horizons	2014	CD	16-track compilation released for Celtic Thunder Cruise 2014
Celtic Thunder: Celtic Roots Myths & Legends	30 October 2015	3 CDs plus 3 DVDs	amazon.com exclusive set including the complete Mythology recording session
Celtic Thunder: Emmet Cahill's Ireland	2017	CD	13 track album featuring Emmet Cahill
Celtic Thunder: Ireland	2020	CD	15 track album

=== Live albums ===
Title	Date of release	Media format	Featured soloists	Notes	Certifications
Celtic Thunder: Live & Unplugged at Sullivan Hall New York	2013	CD & DVD	Byrne, Cahill, Donaldson, Harkin, Keegan, Kelly	filmed in December 2012	
Celtic Thunder: Legacy, Vol. 1	26 February 2016	CD, DVD, Blu-ray, Vinyl	Byrne, Harkin, Keegan, Kelly, McGinty, O'Hanlon	McGinty is credited as "special guest"	ARIA: Gold (DVD)
Celtic Thunder: Legacy, Vol. 2	12 August 2016	CD, DVD	Byrne, Harkin, Keegan, Kelly, McGinty, O'Hanlon	only available through PBS pledge drive until officially released in fall 2016	
