= John Egan (footballer, born 1937) =

Scottish footballer

Personal information
- Full name: John Egan
- Date of birth: 9 August 1937 (age 89)
- Place of birth: Kilsyth, Scotland
- Position: Left wing

Senior career*
Years	Team	Apps	(Gls)
- Dunipace
1957–1958	Ballymena United		
1958–1959	Stranraer	25	(5)
1959–1960	Stenhousemuir	4	(1)
1960	Halifax Town	5	(0)
1960	Accrington Stanley	1	(0)
1960–19??	Nelson		
Total		32	(2)
- * Club domestic league appearances and goals

John Egan (born 9 August 1937) is a Scottish retired professional footballer who played as a left winger in the Scottish League and the English Football League.
