= Colm Keegan =

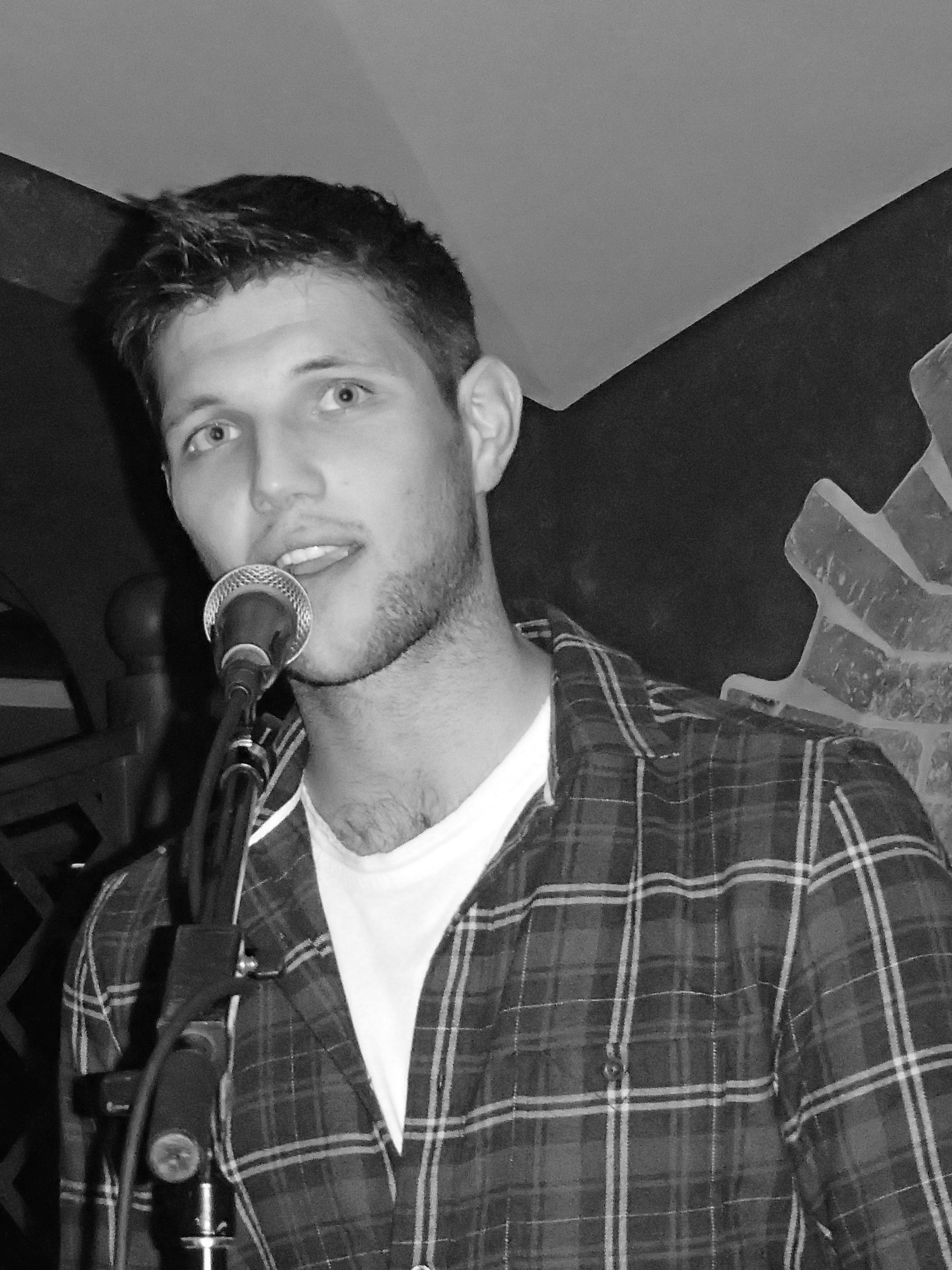
- Celtic Thunder Cruise 2014

Background information
- Born: Colm Joseph Keegan; 2 August 1989 (age 37); Dublin, Ireland
- Occupations: Singer; Songwriter; Teacher
- Instruments: Vocals; Piano; Guitar
- Years active: 2011–present
- Spouse: Laura Durrant
- Website: colmkeegan.com ckonlineteaching.com

Colm Keegan (born 2 August 1989) is a singer, songwriter and teacher from Dublin, Ireland. He is currently a part time principal singer with Irish music group, Celtic Thunder. He also previously performed with the likes of Celtic Woman, The Priests, and Irish tenor Peter Corry. He released his first solo album "I'll Never Be Alone" in the fall of 2016.

== Early life and education ==
In 2008–2009 and again in 2010–2011, Colm was awarded a singing scholarship with the Choral Scholars of University College Dublin under the direction of Dr Desmond Earley.

Colm was also offered a Scholarship position with Dublin Choral Foundation's Lassus Scholars and returned to singing with his former choir director of Dublin's Palestrina Choir, Ite O'Donovan.

Colm spent his weekends in university teaching singing in the Habemus Performing Arts School, also appearing as guest assistant musical director for a number of amateur musical productions, including West Side Story, HMS Pinafore and Pirates of Penzance.

== Career ==
=== Celtic Woman ===
Whilst still in college, Colm was invited to join the Aontas Choral Ensemble, the touring choir of Irish music group Celtic Woman. Colm recorded as a member of the choir for the "Songs From The Heart" CD and DVD Public Television special. Upon graduating from University College Dublin, he completed two European tours, a tour of Asia, the making of "Believe" CD and DVD, and a five-month North American tour with the production. Colm spent a year with the group before leaving to join Celtic Thunder.

=== Celtic Thunder ===
In May 2012, Colm was invited by producer Sharon Browne to join Celtic Thunder and first performed with the group in June of that year at Harrah's Resort and Casino in Atlantic City, New Jersey. Later that year, he filmed "Mythology", his debut DVD and CD as a principal member. He has subsequently toured the United States and Canada numerous times as a principal member of the group, including a special one-off 'unplugged' concert in New York during December 2012, which raised approximately $50,000 in aid of the victims of Hurricane Sandy. In 2014, Colm toured in Australia for the first time; He has also sailed on the Celtic Thunder Cruise in both 2013 and 2014 as one of the star performers. In early 2016, Keegan announced that he would be taking a year's break from Celtic Thunder to finish attending university.

=== Solo career ===
In mid 2014, Colm teamed up with Celtic Thunder cellist (and future wife) Laura Durrant to release a debut single of the Tony Arata song "The Dance". The song soon went to #1 on iTunes World Music Charts, #1 bestseller on Amazon and #1 on Hot New Releases on CD Baby.

Upon returning from his first tour of Australia with Celtic Thunder, Colm and Laura decided to tour together, and from there, CKonTour was born. In August 2014, the duo embarked on a two-week solo tour of the United States East Coast.

Early in 2015, Colm was voted Best New Irish Artist for 2014 in the Irish Music Awards (IMA). In, 2015 Colm released another single, this time recording with his brothers the Irish classic "Raglan Road", which rose to #1 on the iTunes World music charts.

On the back of releasing the music video for Colm's original song "Waves of Future", Colm and Laura took CKonTour on the road again, this time performing 22 dates across the United States, including headlining the Rocky Mountain Irish Festival in Colorado, and an online StageIt show which was streamed live around the world.

== Teaching ==
Keegan launched his newest project, CKonLine, an online teaching forum in July 2015.

== Personal life ==
Keegan married Laura Durrant on 26 July 2016. The couple had a baby boy, Oisín, in 2017. In November 2018, their daughter Isla was born. Keegan announced her birth on Instagram the next day

== Discography ==
Title	Artist	Role	Year	Notes
Songs From The Heart	Celtic Woman	Choir	2010	
Believe	Celtic Woman	Choir	2012	
Mythology	Celtic Thunder	Principal	2013	
Live & Unplugged	Celtic Thunder	Principal	2013	
Islands	Celtic Thunder	Principal	2013	
Myths & Legends	Celtic Thunder	Principal	2013	Australian Exclusive
Christmas Voices	Celtic Thunder	Principal	2013	
My Land	Celtic Thunder	Principal	2014	Australian Exclusive
Celtic Horizons	Celtic Thunder	Principal	2014	
Holiday Symphony	Celtic Thunder	Principal	2014	
The Very Best of Celtic Thunder	Celtic Thunder	Principal	2015	
It's Entertainment!	Celtic Thunder	Principal	2015	remake CD; songs by Damian McGinty were replaced with Keegan's voice.
Memories (EP)	Colm Keegan		2014	
The Dance (Single)	Colm Keegan		2014	
Raglan Road (Single)	Colm Keegan		2015	also featuring brothers John, Paul, Noel & Mark Keegan
Legacy	Celtic Thunder	Principal	2016	

== Filmography ==
Title	Artist	Role	Year	Notes
Songs From The Heart	Celtic Woman	Choir	2010	
Believe	Celtic Woman	Choir	2012	
Mythology	Celtic Thunder	Principal	2013	
Live & Unplugged	Celtic Thunder	Principal	2013	
Myths & Legends	Celtic Thunder	Principal	2013	Australian Exclusive
My Land	Celtic Thunder	Principal	2014	Australian Exclusive
Legacy- Volume 1	Celtic Thunder	Principal	2016	
Legacy- Volume 2	Celtic Thunder	Principal	2016	
