= Fred Eggan =

American anthropologist

Frederick Russell Eggan (September 12, 1906, in Seattle, Washington – May 7, 1991) was an American anthropologist best known for his innovative application of the principles of British social anthropology to the study of Native American tribes. He was the favorite student of the British social anthropologist A. R. Radcliffe-Brown during Radcliffe-Brown's years at the University of Chicago. His fieldwork was among Pueblo peoples in the southwestern U.S. Eggan later taught at Chicago himself. His students there included Sol Tax.

His best known works include his edited volume Social Anthropology of North American Tribes (1937) and The American Indian (1966).

His wife, Dorothy Way Eggan (1901–1965), whom he married in 1939, was also an anthropologist.

== Introduction ==
Frederick Eggan was a North American anthropologist in the 20th century and part of the anthropology department at the University of Chicago. He is a world-renowned social anthropologist, most famous for his works in the Southwest involving the Hopi Indians and many of the social changes that take place within the Western Pueblos. Ernest L. Schusky claims Fred Eggan is a founder of modern American anthropoly's eclectic approach, which combines the functionalism of Radcliffe-Brown with the historical approach of Franz Boas. In a paper titled “Among the Anthropologist,” Eggan answers a question posed by Margaret Mead: “Shouldn’t we all be branches of one human science?” Eggan states that anthropology should center on man and his works, while providing a spectrum of specialized fields which interlock with those of the social and behavioral sciences.

== Background ==
Frederick Eggan was born in Seattle, Washington, on September 12, 1906, to Alfred Eggan and Olive Smith. Eggan earned his master's degree in psychology with a minor in anthropology from the University of Chicago in the early 20th century. He received his PhD in anthropology from the same university several years later with a doctoral thesis entitled “Social Organization of the Western Pueblos” analyzing the social organization of Pueblo Indians in the Southwest. Fred was an active member in the discipline of anthropology at a critical time when new technologies and methods were being invented for archeological purposes. He mentions these innovations in his paper on “Social Anthropology and the Method of Controlled Comparison.” He speaks of the new aids to anthropological research such as radiocarbon dating, genetics, and the experimental method which are just a few of the many rapid technological advances that had taken place to aid the discipline in this time. Eggan married Dorothy Way in 1938; she was also an anthropologist of the Hopi. Fred died in his house in Santa Fe, New Mexico from heart failure on May 7, 1991; he was 84.

== Employment history ==
Fred Eggan served as chairman at the University of Chicago of the department of anthropology; he was also president of the American Anthropological Association. He was also employed as a professor of psychology, sociology, and history at Wentworth Junior College and Military Academy in Missouri before he obtained his PhD. Eggan also worked as a research assistant to Radcliffe-Brown at the University of Chicago, researching the social organization of Native American tribes. During his time teaching at the University of Chicago, Frederick held several positions. He was employed as an assistant professor (1940–1942), an associate professor (1942–1948), and professor (1948–1963). Fred retired from teaching in 1974. He addressed the connection between anthropology and the educational system in the following terms “Anthropology and education should have close working relations. Educators are occupied by the task of keeping the operations going, particularly in this period of changing models, and have little time or opportunity to step outside their educational institutions and them as a system in the society as a whole. He was also the director of the Philippine Studies Program at the University of Chicago. Eggan also held a prominent position for the Philippine government during World War II as chief of research.

== Awards and honors ==
Frederick Eggan was president of the American Anthropological Association from 1953 to 1954. He was also awarded the Weatherhead Resident Scholar in 1979 by the School for Advanced Research for his work entitled “The Great Basic Background of Hopi Culture History. He also received the Viking Fund medal in 1956. Towards the end of Frederick Eggan’s career in the 1960s, he was elected to the American Philosophical Society, American Academy of Arts and Sciences, as well as to the National Academy of Sciences.

== Key field work ==
Frederick Eggan has participated in several field studies at many different locations. Some of these sites include: Santa Fe where he lived with the Hopi Indians for a summer (1932), Mississippi and Oklahoma where his research was focused on primarily the Choctaw, Cheyenne, and Arapaho Indians (1933), and the Northern Philippines where he studied social changes in the Ifugao, Bontok, Tinguian, and Ilocano Indians (1934–1935).

== Research emphasis ==
Eggan’s research has been primarily focused on “Native American kinship and social systems”, making use of archeological, linguistic, and general ethnographic evidence. With his work in North America, Eggan attempted to create a theory to illuminate Boasian empiricism, which was a theory developed by Franz Boas that all knowledge was derived from sense-experience. Eggan's work in Santa Fe analyzed each Western Pueblo social structure and compared and contrasted them to the Eastern Pueblos. His most important contribution to archeology, and possibly anthropology in general, was his demonstrations how the variations currently observed in the Pueblo social structures are related to cultural adaptations to ecological niches. Eggan's time spent studying the Cheyenne and Arapaho served as a basis for one of his most famous works, “Social Anthropology and the Method of Controlled Comparison.” He demonstrated how it was possible for the Cheyenne to change from a predominantly agricultural based lineage type kinship system to a system that was predominantly nomadic involving a heavy dependence on hunting and gathering in bands to increase their efficiency. Eggan theorized from his extensive research that this was a result of being forced by other tribes onto the Plains out of their land, which was in present-day Minnesota. The result of Eggan's work in the Philippines can be found in his paper on “Cultural Drift and Social Change.” It is in this paper that he claims as one travels from the interior down to the coast, there are patterned series of changes in a definite direction in many important cultural institutions such as social, political, economic, and religious.

== Selected papers ==
- Eggan, Fred (1934). "The Maya Kinship System and Cross-Cousin Marriage". American Anthropologist. 36 (2): 188–202. doi:10.1525/aa.1934.36.2.02a00050. JSTOR 661687.
- Ed. Social Anthropology of North American Tribes. Chicago: University of Chicago Press.
- The Cheyenne and Arapaho kinship systems. In Social Anthropology of North American Tribes, ed. F. Eggan, pp. 35–95. Chicago: University of Chicago Press.
- Eggan, Fred (1937). "Historical Changes in the Choctaw Kinship System". American Anthropologist. 39 (1): 34–52. doi:10.1525/aa.1937.39.1.02a00040. JSTOR 662072.
- Eggan, Fred (1941). "Some Aspects of Culture Change in the Northern Philippines". American Anthropologist. 43 (1): 11–18. doi:10.1525/aa.1941.43.1.02a00030. JSTOR 662983.
- The Hopi and the lineage principle. In Social Structure: Studies Presented to A.R. Radcliffe-Brown, ed. M. Fortes, pp. 121–144. Oxford: Clarendon Press.
- Social Organization of the Western Pueblos. Chicago: University of Chicago Press.
- The ethnological cultures and their archaeological backgrounds. In Archaeology of the Eastern United States, ed. J. B. Griffin, pp. 35–45. Chicago: University of Chicago Press.
- Eggan, Fred (October 1954). "Social Anthropology and the Method of Controlled Comparison". American Anthropologist. 56 (5): 743–763. doi:10.1525/aa.1954.56.5.02a00020.
- Ed. Social Anthropology of North American Tribes. Chicago: University of Chicago Press. 2nd edition.
- Social anthropology: methods and results. In Social Anthropology of North American Tribes, ed. F. Eggan, pp. 485–551. Chicago: University of Chicago Press.
- Eggan, Fred (1956). "Ritual Myths among the Tinguian". The Journal of American Folklore. 69 (274): 331–339. doi:10.2307/536339. JSTOR 536339.
- With W. L. Warner. A. R. Radcliffe-Brown, 1881–1955. Am. Anthropol. 58:544–547.
- Glottochronology: a preliminary appraisal of the North American data. In Proceedings, 32nd International Congress of Americanists, pp. 645–653. Copenhagen: Munksgaard.
- With R. H. Lowie. Kinship terminologies. Encyclopædia Britannica vol. 13, pp. 407–409.
- Eggan, Fred (1963). "Cultural Drift and Social Change". Current Anthropology. 4 (4): 347–355. doi:10.1086/200393. JSTOR 2739890. S2CID 144853174.
- Alliance and descent in a western Pueblo society. In Process and Pattern in Culture, ed. R. Manners, pp. 175–184. Chicago: Aldine Press.
- The American Indian: Perspectives for the Study of Social Change. Chicago: Aldine Press.
- From history to myth: a Hopi example. In Studies in Southwestern Ethnolinguistics, ed. D. Hymes, pp. 33–53. The Hague: Mouton.
- Lewis Henry Morgan's Systems: a reevaluation. In Kinship Studies in the Morgan Centennial Year, ed. P. Reining, pp. 1–16. Washington, D.C.: Anthropological Society of Washington.
- Eggan, Fred (October 1974). "Among the Anthropologists". Annual Review of Anthropology. 3 (1): 1–20. doi:10.1146/annurev.an.03.100174.000245. S2CID 146647130.
- Pueblos: introduction. In Handbook of the North American Indians, Vol. 9: Southwest, ed. A. Ortiz, pp. 224–235. Washington, D.C.: Smithsonian Institution Press.
- With T. N. Pandey. Zuni history: 1850–1970. In Handbook of North American Indians, Vol. 9: Southwest, ed. A. Ortiz, pp. 474–484. Washington, D.C.: Smithsonian Institution Press.
- Beyond the bicentennial: the future of the American Indian in the perspectives of the past. J. Anthropol. Res. 34:161–180.
- Shoshone kinship structures and their significance for anthropological theory. J. Steward Anthropol. Soc. 11:165–193.
- Comparative social organization. In Handbook of North American Indians, Vol. 10: Southwest, ed. A. Ortiz, pp. 723–743. Washington, D.C.: Smithsonian Institution Press.
- Eggan, Fred (1941). "Some Aspects of Culture Change in the Northern Philippines". American Anthropologist. 43 (1): 11–18. doi:10.1525/aa.1941.43.1.02a00030. JSTOR 662983.
