= James Egan =

James Egan may refer to:

- Jamie Egan, American musician and member of Catch 22
- James Egan (artist) (1929–2017), Australian artist
- James Egan (engraver) (1799–1842), Irish engraver
- James J. Egan (1839–1914), Irish-American architect
- James Egan Moulton (1841–1909), English-born Australian Methodist minister and headmaster

== See also ==
- Jim Egan (disambiguation)
