= Kevin Eggan =

American Professor of Stem Cell and Regenerative Biology

- Born: 1974 (age 51–52); Normal, Illinois
- Known for: stem cell
- Scientific career
- Workplaces: Harvard University
- Doctoral advisor: Rudolf Jaenisch

Kevin Eggan (born 1974 in Normal, Illinois) is a Professor of Stem Cell and Regenerative Biology at Harvard University, known for his work in stem cell research (also known as "therapeutic cloning"), and as a spokesperson for stem cell research in the United States. He was a 2006 recipient of a MacArthur Fellowship (sometimes nicknamed the "genius grant"). In 2005, he was named to the MIT Technology Review TR35 as one of the top 35 innovators in the world under the age of 35. He joined Biomarin in 2020.

== Biography ==
=== Background and education ===
Eggan grew up in Normal, Illinois, the son of Chris and Larry Eggan and one of five children, his father being a math professor at Illinois State University.

After completing his bachelor's degree in microbiology at the University of Illinois Urbana-Champaign, he applied to medical school to become a doctor, but his doubts caused him to defer in favor of a two-year internship with drug company Amgen at the National Institutes of Health. In 1998 he applied to study for a Ph.D. in biology at the Massachusetts Institute of Technology, arriving there shortly after Dolly the Sheep gained worldwide attention as the world's first cloned domestic animal.

Eggan began to explore both this process and also the reasons that cloned animals often appeared to develop abnormally, with organ defects and immunological problems – his first contact with stem cell research. After finishing his PhD in 2002, Eggan split his time between a post-doctoral program with genetics pioneer Rudolf Jaenisch and a collaborative project with Richard Axel, a Nobel Prize–winning scientist at the Howard Hughes Medical Institute, as well as spending time at the University of Hawaiʻi.

=== Stem cell research ===
In August 2004, Eggan moved to Harvard University in Cambridge, Massachusetts, as a junior fellow, becoming an assistant professor of Molecular & Cellular Biology at their Stem Cell Institute ("HSCI") in 2005. At the time, stem cell research in the United States was threatened by political pressure due to concerns over the ethics of human embryo research, and research such as this was at risk of potentially being made illegal. Federal funding for stem cell research had recently been removed, and part of his role was to obtain private funding to replace it. Eggan took on a second role as the assistant investigator for Stowers Institute for Medical Research, a philanthropical medical research group in Kansas City, Missouri.

Eggan's research goals at Harvard were to understand how nuclear transplantation works, and to make stem cells that carry genes for specific diseases such as Parkinson's disease, amyotrophic lateral sclerosis (Lou Gehrig's disease), and Alzheimer's. In 2006, following "more than two years of intensive ethical and scientific review", two groups of scientists at HSCI were granted permission to explore Somatic Cell Nuclear Transfer techniques to create disease-specific stem cell lines as an approach to various currently incurable conditions. Eggan was in charge of one of these two groups and senior author of their results; a renowned co-director of HSCI ran the other. The groups initially collaborated in researching diabetes before Eggan's group switched to work on neurodegenerative diseases. Harvard President Lawrence Summers called the approvals "a seminal event".

Eggan also served as the Chief Scientific Officer of The New York Stem Cell Foundation.

=== Work to date ===
Eggan's work as of 2007 has succeeded in developing a technique of merging stem and skin cells that has obtained considerable public attention as a possible avenue to avoid moral objections regarding stem cell research in the context of serious illness. It suggests that ultimately, treatment of serious illnesses and understanding of stem cell development may be possible to obtain without recourse to human embryos – a highly desirable state of affairs politically, given the concurrent controversy over stem cell research in the United States.

Eggan's team reported that they had created cells similar to human embryonic stem cells without destroying embryos, a major step toward someday possibly defusing the central objection to stem cell research. These discoveries sparked extensive debate in the United States Congress, with opponents of the use of embryonic stem cells from fetuses arguing that these or similar methods of creating stem cells from skin might be eventually used instead to satisfy the conflicting demands of medical research and morals.

"Eggan's technique provides a window into exactly what happens to turn back the clock in cells during cloning--and, indeed, in the normal process of creating sperm, eggs and embryos. Somehow, aging is reversed, and old cells become young again. As Schatten puts it, the one-way freeway of life has an exit ramp. Understanding what happens when the cell is reprogrammed is one of the main goals of studying embryonic stem cells. But right now, the only way to solve that problem is to clone embryos, which is a difficult and expensive process.

Eggan himself is cautious about his team's work, with an early stage 2005 profile in Nature noting there was still much work to do:

The hybrids still contain two nuclei: one from a skin cell and one from an embryonic stem cell. So they have an abnormally high amount of DNA, and Eggan needs to work out how to remove the embryonic stem cell's DNA. Eggan adds that he has only just begun working with the hybrids, so it is not clear what they will or won't be able to do. "It's frustrating," Eggan says, "because they're implying that our work is a solution, which it is not yet. These are ideas in their most nascent stages."

=== Work as spokesperson ===
Forbes noted in Eggan's 2007 profile that:

"Eggan is also becoming one of science's more outspoken voices, defending the necessity of pursuing embryonic cell research through all available means as a way of understanding scourges [such as degenerative diseases]."

== Publications ==
Eggan's five most highly cited publications are:

- Humpherys, D; Eggan, K; Akutsu, H; Hochedlinger, K; Rideout, WM; Biniszkiewicz, D; Yanagimachi, R; Jaenisch, R. "Epigenetic instability in ES cells and cloned mice": Science, 293 (5527): 95-97 JUL 6 2001, Times Cited: 288
- Rideout, WM; Eggan, K; Jaenisch, R. "Nuclear cloning and epigenetic reprogramming of the genome. Science, 293 (5532): 1093-1098 (2001). Times Cited: 250
- Eggan, K; Akutsu, H; Loring, J; Jackson-Grusby, L; Klemm, M; Rideout, WM; Yanagimachi, R; Jaenisch, R. "Hybrid vigor, fetal overgrowth, and viability of mice derived by nuclear cloning and tetraploid embryo complementation," Proceedings of the National Academy of Sciences, 98 (11): 6209-6214, May 22, 2001. Times Cited: 191
- Humphreys, D; Eggan, K; Akutsu, H; Friedman, A; Hochedlinger, K; Yanagimachi, R; Lander, ES; Golub, TR; Jaenisch, R. "Abnormal gene expression in cloned mice derived from embryonic stem cell and cumulus cell nuclei." Proceedings of the National Academy of Sciences, 99 (20): 12889-12894 (2002). Times Cited: 157
- Bortvin, A; Eggan, K; Skaletsky, H; Akutsu, H; Berry, DL; Yanagimachi, R; Page, DC; Jaenisch, R. "Incomplete reactivation of Oct4-related genes in mouse embryos cloned from somatic nuclei" Development, 130 (8): 1673-1680 (2003) Times Cited: 143

== Awards ==
- Winner of Harold M. Weintraub Graduate Student Award in 2003 sponsored by the Basic Sciences Division of the Fred Hutchinson Cancer Research Center
- Honored in Popular Science's fourth annual "Brilliant 10" in 2005
- Technology Review Magazine's "Innovator of the Year" in 2005
- MacArthur Fellows Program 2006
- People Magazine's "Sexiest Genius" in 2006
