= Baothghalach Mór Mac Aodhagáin =

Irish poet

Baothghalach Mór Mac Aodhagáin (c. 1550–1600) was an Irish poet.

Reputedly from Duniry, he was of the Mac Aodhagáin clan of poets. In his lifetime, his family were keepers of Leabhar Breac. His poems were edited by Lambert McKenna in 1939.
