= Lavinia Hartwell Egan =

American writer (1863–1945)

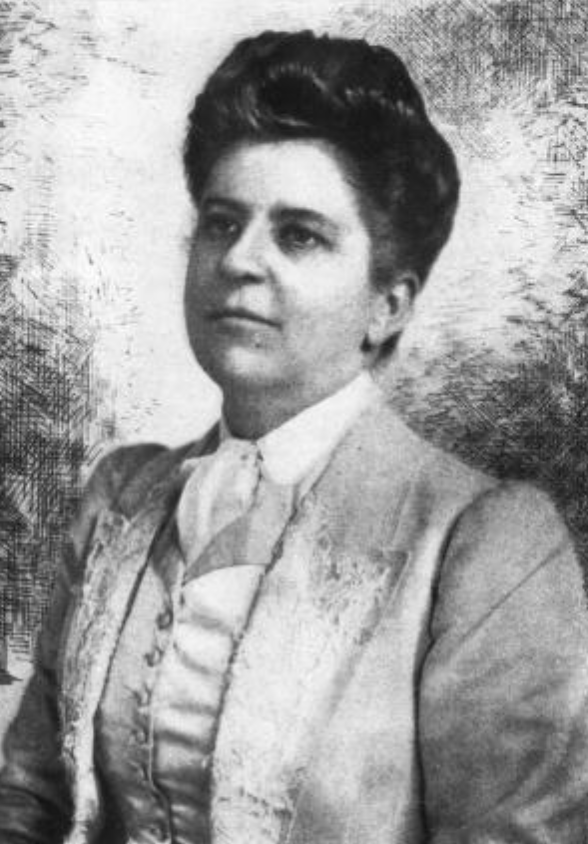
- Lavinia Hartwell Egan, from a 1904 publication
- Born: November 21, 1863; Fairfield, Texas, U.S.
- Died: March 19, 1945 (age 81); Mount Lebanon, Louisiana, U.S.
- Other names: Lavina H. Eagan, Patience Oriel
- Occupations: Writer, clubwoman, suffragist
- Relatives: William B. Giles Egan (uncle)

Lavinia Hartwell Egan (November 21, 1863 – March 19, 1945) was an American writer, clubwoman, educator, and suffragist from Louisiana.

== Early life and education ==
Egan was born in Texas and raised in Shreveport, Louisiana, the daughter of James C. Egan and Susan Rebecca Ardis Egan. Her father was a surgeon in the Confederate States Army during the American Civil War. Her Irish-born grandfather Bartholomew Egan and her brother William L. Egan were also prominent physicians in Louisiana. Her uncle William B. Giles Egan was a justice on the Louisiana Supreme Court. She studied at Ward Seminary in Nashville, Tennessee, and in Louisiana.

== Career ==
Egan was president of the Hypatia Club, a women's literary club, president of the Woman's Athletic Club, and president of the City Improvement League, both in Shreveport. She also taught school and sold real estate in Shreveport. She was president of the Louisiana State Federation of Women's Clubs, and chair of the federation's press committee. She was a member of the Board of Lady Managers at the 1904 Louisiana Purchase Exposition in St. Louis, appointed by Governor William Wright Heard. She was also a member of the United Daughters of the Confederacy.

Egan wrote a syndicated newspaper column under the pen-name "Patience Oriel". During World War I, she lived in Washington, D.C., and worked in the Office of Military Aeronautics, writing technical articles and press releases. She testified before a Congressional hearing on housing for women war workers during the 1918 flu pandemic. She became a member of the governing board of the National Woman's Party, and was a chair of the Woman's Suffrage Party of Louisiana. In spring 1919, she wrote a letter to The New York Times, suggesting that the United States Senate would be better able to do the work of government if they met outdoors, "In the light of God's glorious sunshine, with the breath of heaven to bring refreshment to their souls, the provincialism, the egoism, the befogged vision of the Senators would, no doubt disappear," she proposed.

After suffrage was won, she gave lectures to women's groups about the importance of women's votes, and about the Equal Rights Amendment. "Miss Egan is an ardent feminist," explained one 1921 newspaper report, "and is interested in seeing laws giving women full legal and civil rights written into the statute books of the State of Louisiana." Later in life she wrote local history articles for the Shreveport Journal.

== Publications ==
- A Bundle of Fagots (1895, collection of short stories)
- "The Future of the Negro in Fiction" (1895, essay)
- "The Prize Story" (1895, short story)
- "Prophetic" (1896, poem)
- "In the Back Parlor" (1897, short story)
- "The Old-Fashioned Valentine" (1898, short story)
- "The Great Exposition and the Home" (1904, article)
- "My Sweetheart Flower" and "Love's Immortality" (1905, poems)
- "The Nomination of Stephen Wingate" (1905, short story)
- "A Piece of Assurance" (1906, short story)
- "A Miracle" (1907, short story)
- "Distinctive Homes of Bienville Parish" (1935, article)
- "Mount Lebanon First Place in State to Grow Castor Beans" (1940, article)

== Personal life ==
Egan's personal style was considered symbolic of her "uncommon individuality and force of character", as she favored short hair and tailored suits with neckties. She died in 1945, at the age of 81, in Mount Lebanon, Louisiana. Her home in Louisiana, Wayside Cottage, was purchased by the Mt. Lebanon Historical Society in 2020, with plans to restore the building as a historic site.
