= John Egan (CPR) =

General Superintendent of the Canadian Pacific Railway's Western Division

John Egan was General Superintendent of the Canadian Pacific Railway's Western Division from 1882 to July 1886 with headquarters at Winnipeg, Manitoba. He was succeeded by William Whyte.

Formerly with the Chicago, Milwaukee and St. Paul Railway, Egan was hired by William Cornelius Van Horne to oversee the completion of the first transcontinental rail link in Canada. He was present at the driving of the last spike on 7 November 1885.

Egan returned to the United States where he held executive positions with the St Paul, Minneapolis & Manitoba Railway amongst others.
