= Thomas Egan =

Thomas or Tom Egan may refer to:

- Thomas Egan (gangster) (1874–1919), St. Louis politician and organized crime figure
- Thomas Egan (cricketer) (1906–1979), Australian cricketer
- Thomas C. Egan (1894–1961), United States federal judge
- Tom Egan (born 1946), former professional baseball player
- Thomas W. Egan (1836–1887), American Civil War general
- Thomas Egan (physician) (1752–1818), Irish physician
- Thomas Selby Egan (1814–1893), first cox to win the Boat Race for Cambridge University
- The fictional character Major Tommy Egan from the 2014 film Good Kill.
