= James Egan (engraver) =

Irish mezzotint engraver (1799–1842)

James Egan (1799–1842) was an Irish mezzotint engraver.

== Life ==
Egan was born in County Roscommon. He was employed by Samuel William Reynolds, the mezzotint engraver, at first as little more than an errand-boy, but later in laying his mezzotint grounds. Egan set up a business of ground-laying for engravers, while he studied in order to become an engraver himself. Becoming consumptive, he had eight years' struggle with declining health; and died at Pentonville, 2 October 1842, aged 43. Egan, who married young, left a family, for whom a subscription was raised by his friends.

== Works ==
His last plate was 'English Hospitality in the Olden Time,' after George Cattermole. Among his other engravings were 'Love's Reverie,' after John Rogers Herbert, 'Abbot Boniface,' after Gilbert Stuart Newton, 'The Morning after the Wreck,' after Charles Bentley, 'The Study,' after E. Stone, 'The Mourner,' after J. M. Moore, 'The Young Wife,' 'The Citation of Wycliffe,' 'The Tribunal of the Inquisition,' and other pictures after S. J. E. Jones, and a portrait of John Lodge, librarian at Cambridge, after Walmisley.
