= John Egan (chairman) =

John Egan (1750?-1810) was an Irish barrister, politician, and chairman of Kilmainham, County Dublin.

== Life ==
Egan was born around 1750 at Charleville, County Cork, where his father was a beneficed clergyman. Having entered Trinity College Dublin, as a sizar, he graduated there B.A. 1773, and LL.B. 1776; the degree of LL.D. (honoris causa) was conferred upon him in 1790.

He was called to the Irish bar in 1778, and, mainly through the friendship of Barry Yelverton, 1st Viscount Avonmore, chief baron of the exchequer, he made his way in the profession. In due course he received his silk gown; in 1787 he was elected a bencher of the King's Inns, Dublin; and for several years before his death he held the judicial office of chairman of Kilmainham.

He had taken a large share of business as a practising barrister, but a quarrel with Henry Grattan damaged him professionally. In the Irish House of Commons he for some years represented the borough of Tallaght, County Waterford, prominent on the question of the legislative union of Great Britain and Ireland. He died in 1810.
