= Nicholas Burke =

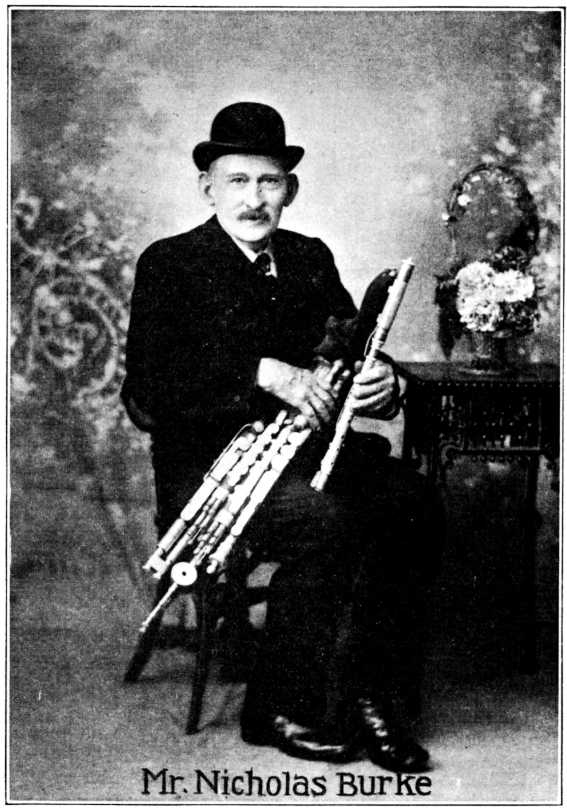
1912

Nicholas Burke (October 1837- 5 June 1919) was an Irish uilleann piper.

Burke was born in the parish of Annaghdown. He emigrated to the United States as a young man, settling in Brooklyn, New York. There he worked as a carpenter, "developed into a skilful draughtsman, and eventually became a successful and prosperous builder." He gained a reputation as a piper of distinction, playing the uilleann pipes primarily for himself, or "the entertainment of his friends, and invariably in his own home."

Captain Francis O'Neill relied heavily upon him as an informant for other Irish pipers of the 1800s, many of whom Burke was acquainted.

"On learning the nature of the purpose in view, Mr. Burke obligingly “took his pen in hand” and wrote out pages upon pages of interesting memoirs dealing with nearly a score of pipers about whom we knew practically nothing, besides giving supplementary information concerning many others already on our list. In fact Mr. Burke may aptly be termed the Plutarch of the pipers."

== See also ==
- Uilleann pipes
- Séamus Ennis (1919–1982), piper
- Martin O'Reilly (1829–1904), piper
- William Connolly (piper) (born 1839)
