= Chris Egan =

Chris or Christopher Egan may refer to:

- Chris Egan (footballer) (born 1986), Australian rules footballer
- Chris Egan (musician), British composer, orchestrator, conductor and musical director
- Chris Egan (tennis), tennis player of the 1990s
- Christopher Egan (born 1984), Australian actor
- Christopher F. Egan, American businessman and diplomat
