= Joe Egan =

Joe or Joseph Egan may refer to:

- Joe Egan (boxer), Irish boxer
- Joe Egan (musician) (1946–2024), Scottish musician
- Joe Egan (Paralympian) (born 1953), Australian Paralympian
- Joe Egan (rugby league) (1919–2012), English rugby league footballer and coach
- Joseph F. Egan (1917–1964), American lawyer and politician from New York
- Joseph V. Egan (born 1938), American politician from New Jersey
