= Richard Egan =

Richard Egan may refer to:

- Richard Egan (actor) (1921–1987), American film actor
- Richard Egan (businessman) (1936–2009), American businessman, co-founder of EMC Corporation, one-time Ambassador to Ireland
- Richard Egan (solicitor), British defence lawyer
- Dick Egan (American football), former professional American football player
- Dick Egan (infielder) (1884–1947), MLB infielder
- Dick Egan (pitcher) (born 1937), MLB pitcher
- Rich Egan, founder of Vagrant Records
