= Redwood Castle =

Castle in Ireland

Coordinates: 53°08′48.74″N 8°07′14.21″W

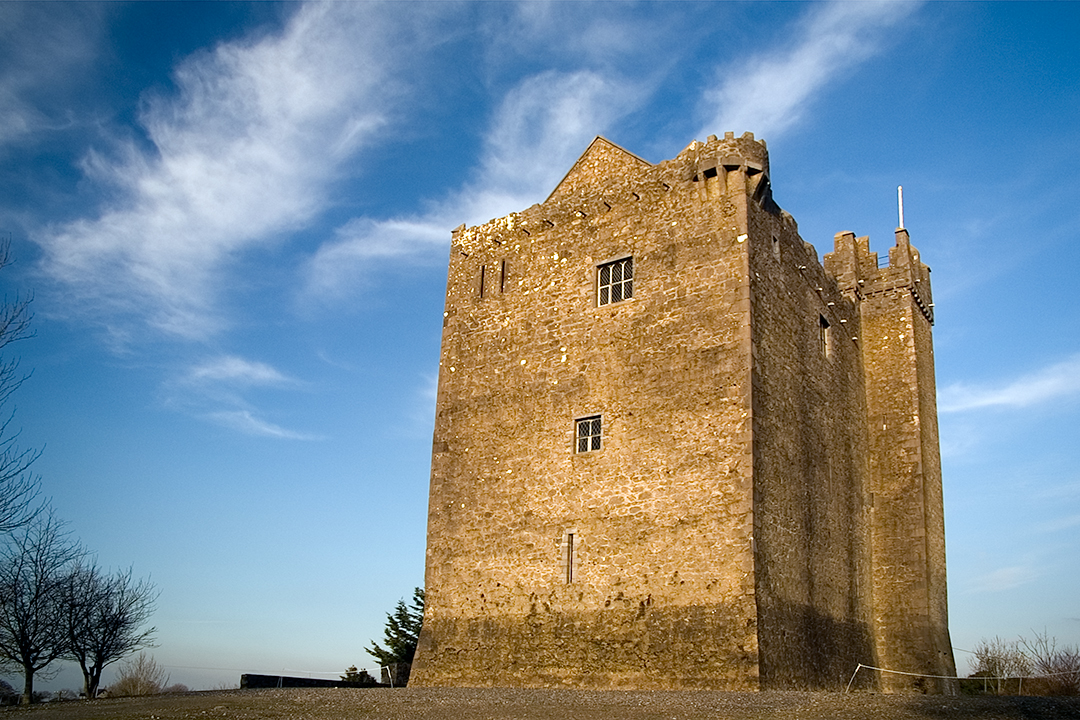
Redwood Castle Co. Tipperary

Redwood Castle (also known as Egan Castle or Caisleán Choillte Rua in Irish) is a Norman castle near Lorrha in County Tipperary, Ireland.

The castle was built by the Normans around 1200 AD, and was occupied by them until c. 1350, when the Mac Aodhagáin (MacEgan, Egan, Keegan) were installed on the lands.

As hereditary Brehons or lawyers, the Mac Aodhagáin clan established a school of learning here, which was patronised by the family for several hundred years.

The castle was enlarged and renovated several times, with considerable work from 1350. Aside from the original thick stone walls, the building has some architectural features common to Irish fortifications of the period including a murder-hole, and some less common features including a Sheela na gig.

The castle remained under continuous occupation and ownership by the (Mac)Egan families until c. 1650, when it was confiscated and burned at the time of the Cromwellian conquest of Ireland.

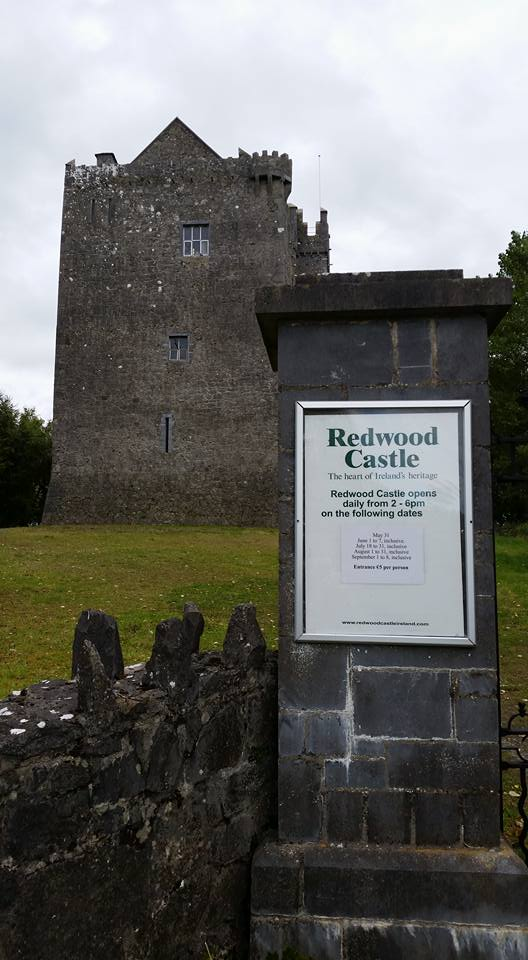
Castle gate

The site remained in ruin for over 300 years, with only the thick exterior walls standing, until Michael J. Egan, a County Mayo lawyer, purchased and renovated the building in 1972. While the castle remains a private residence, terms of the Department of Finance Heritage/Cultural Tax Relief require the castle to open to the public at times during the summer months. It is a protected structure (ref S329) on the North Tipperary list of protected structures.

Clan Egan holds rallies in different countries typically every two years; as of 2025 the 1996, 2000, 2004, and 2008 rallies in Ireland had had segments at Redwood Castle, described as the clan's ancestral home.
