= Michael Egan =

Michael Egan may refer to:

- Michael Egan (Australian politician) (1948–2024)
- Michael Egan (author) (born 1941), scholar of literature
- Michael Egan (Irish politician) (1866–1947), Irish trade unionist and Teachta Dála
- Michael Egan (playwright) (1895–1956), author of The Dominant Sex (1934)
- Michael Egan (Wisconsin politician), state senator, assemblyman and local official
- Michael Francis Egan (1761–1814), first Catholic bishop of Philadelphia
- Michael J. Egan (1926–2016), Georgia (U.S. state) politician
