= William Egan =

William Egan may refer to:

- William Egan (footballer) (1872–1946), Welsh international footballer
- William Egan (gangster) (1884–1921), St. Louis politician and organized crime figure
- William Egan (hurler) (born 1990), Irish hurler
- William A. Egan (1914–1984), American Democratic politician; Governor of Alaska, 1959–1966 and 1970–1974
- William B. Giles Egan (1824–1878), Justice of the Louisiana Supreme Court
- William Bradshaw Egan (1808–1860), Irish American physician and politician
- William F. Egan (1936–2012), American electrical engineer
- William Henry Egan, member of parliament for Birkenhead West, 1923–1924 and 1929–1931
- William P. Egan, American businessman and investor
