= Elgin =

Elgin may refer to:

== Places ==
=== Scotland ===
- Elgin, Moray, Scotland, the administrative and commercial centre for Moray, from which Elgins elsewhere derive their names

=== Canada ===
- Elgin County, Ontario
- Elgin Settlement, a 19th-century community for freed slaves located in present-day North Buxton and South Buxton, Ontario
- Elgin, a village in Rideau Lakes, Ontario
- Elgin, Manitoba
- Elgin Parish, New Brunswick
  - Elgin, New Brunswick, a community in Elgin Parish
- Elgin, Nova Scotia
- Elgin, Quebec
- Port Elgin, New Brunswick, Canada
- Port Elgin, Ontario, Canada

=== United States ===
- Elgin, Alabama
- Elgin, Arizona
- Elgin, Illinois, the most populous place with the name
- Elgin, Iowa
- Elgin, Kansas
- Elgin, Minnesota
- Elgin (Natchez, Mississippi), listed on the NRHP in Mississippi
- Elgin, Missouri
- Elgin, Nebraska
- Elgin, Nevada
- Elgin (Warrenton, North Carolina), listed on the NRHP in North Carolina
- Elgin, North Dakota
- Elgin, Ohio
- Elgin, Oklahoma
- Elgin, Oregon
- Elgin, Pennsylvania
- Elgin, Kershaw County, South Carolina
- Elgin, Lancaster County, South Carolina
- Elgin, Tennessee
- Elgin, Texas
- Elgin, Utah
- Elgin Township (disambiguation)

=== Elsewhere ===
- Elgin, Western Australia, a locality in the Shire of Capel
- Elgin, New Zealand, a suburb of Gisborne
- Elgin, Western Cape, South Africa, a large valley famous for deciduous farming
- The Elgin–Franklin fields, natural gas fields in the North Sea

== Constituencies and electoral districts ==
=== Canada ===
- Elgin (federal electoral district) (1935–1997), a federal electoral district in the province of Ontario
- Elgin (provincial electoral district), a provincial riding in Ontario, Canada, that was merged into the riding of Elgin-Middlesex

=== United Kingdom ===
- Elgin (Parliament of Scotland constituency), a pre-1707 constituency
- Elgin Burghs (UK Parliament constituency), a District of Burghs constituency from 1708 to 1918
- Elginshire (UK Parliament constituency), a county constituency from 1708 to 1832

== People ==
- Elgin (name)

== Brands and enterprises ==
- Elgin (automobile), manufactured by Elgin Motor Car Corporation (1916–1923) and Elgin Motors, Inc. (1923–1924)
- Elgin National Watch Company (1864–1968), an American watch company
- Glen Elgin, a single malt whisky from Speyside
- Elgin American Company, first sponsor of the American game show You Bet Your Life

== Buildings ==
- Elgin Theatre (disambiguation)
- The Elgin, Darjeeling, the summer residence of the Maharaja of Cooch Behar, converted to a hotel
- The Elgin, Ladbroke Grove, a public house in Notting Hill, London

== Music ==
- Elgin (album), a 2011 album by American R&B singer and songwriter Ginuwine
- The Elgins, a Motown group active from 1962 to 1967
- "The Elgins", an early name used by The Temptations in their pre-David Ruffin era

== Schools ==
- Elgin Academy, Moray, Elgin, Scotland, a high school
- Elgin Academy (Elgin, Illinois), United States, an independent, coeducational, college-preparatory school
- Elgin High School (disambiguation)
- Elgin Park Secondary School, a high school in Surrey, British Columbia, Canada

== Transportation ==
- Elgin Street (disambiguation)
- Elgin Avenue, a street in Maida Vale, London
- Elgin Crescent, a street in Notting Hill, London
- Elgin railway station, Elgin, Moray, Scotland
- Elgin station (Illinois), a train station in Elgin, Illinois, United States

== Other uses ==
- Earl of Elgin, a title in the Peerage of Scotland
- Elgin Formation, a geologic formation in Minnesota, United States
- Elgin Marbles, Greek bas-reliefs housed at the British Museum
- Elgin Museum (disambiguation)
- Elgin tablets, a name for a tablet
- Elgin-style butter, another name in the United States for the "Eastern-pack" butter stick size, named for the Elgin Butter Company of Elgin, Illinois

== See also ==
- Elginia, a turtle-like parareptile of the Late Permian period
- Lady Elgin (disambiguation)
- Eglin (disambiguation)
- Egin (disambiguation)
- Elgi
- Elg (disambiguation)
- Éire, cognate with the presumed etymon of "Elgin"
