= Egin =

Egin may refer to:

- Egin (newspaper), a defunct bilingual Basque-Spanish newspaper
- Eğin, the name for the town of Kemaliye, Turkey, until about 1923
- Egin, Idaho, United States, an unincorporated community
- Yuri Egin, an anime-only character of the manga Blue Exorcist

== See also ==
- Egan (disambiguation)
- Egen (disambiguation)
- Egin (disambiguation)
- Eagan (disambiguation)
