= Eglin =

Eglin may refer to:

- Eglin (surname)
- Eglin Air Force Base, a United States Air Force base located southwest of Valparaiso, Florida
- Federal Prison Camp, Eglin, a Federal Bureau of Prisons minimum security prison on the grounds of Eglin Air Force Base
- Eglin steel, a high-strength, high-performance, low-alloy, low-cost steel

== See also ==
- Elgin (disambiguation)
