= Egan =

Egan may refer to:

== People ==
- Egan (surname)
- Egan (given name)

== Places in the United States ==
- Egan, Illinois, an unincorporated community
- Egan, Louisiana, an unincorporated community and census-designated place
- Egan, South Dakota, a city
- Egan, Tennessee, an unincorporated community
- Egan, Texas, an unincorporated community
- Egan Range, a mountain range in Nevada

== Other uses ==
- Egan Center, a convention center in Fairbanks, Alaska, United States
- Egan Junior High School, Los Altos, California
- Charles Egan Gallery, New York
- Redwood Castle, also known as Egan Castle, a Norman castle in County Tipperary, Ireland

== See also ==
- Egan v Canada, a 1995 civil rights of the Supreme Court of Canada
- Egan v Willis, a decision of the High Court of Australia
- Eagan (disambiguation)
