= Egen =

Egen is a surname. Notable people with the surname include:

- Joseph L. Egen Jr, American World War II flying ace
- Kanzan Egen (1277–1360), Japanese Buddhist monk, founder of Myōshin-ji Temple
- Markus Egen (1927–2021), German ice hockey player
- Nurbek Egen (born 1975), Kyrgyz and Russian film and TV director and screenwriter
- Uli Egen (born 1956), German ice hockey player

== See also ==
- Gert van Egen (c. 1550–1612), Flemish sculptor
- Egan (disambiguation)
- Eagan (disambiguation)
