= Eglin (surname) =

Eglin is a surname. Notable people with the surname include:

- Colin Eglin (1925–2013), South African politician
- Frederick I. Eglin (1891–1937), career officer in the United States Army Air Service and United States Army Air Corps
- Manfred Eglin (1935–2001), German footballer
