= St. John in the Wilderness Church (Dharamshala) =

Anglican church in Dharamshala, Himachal Pradesh, India

Coordinates: 32°14′50″N 76°18′39″E

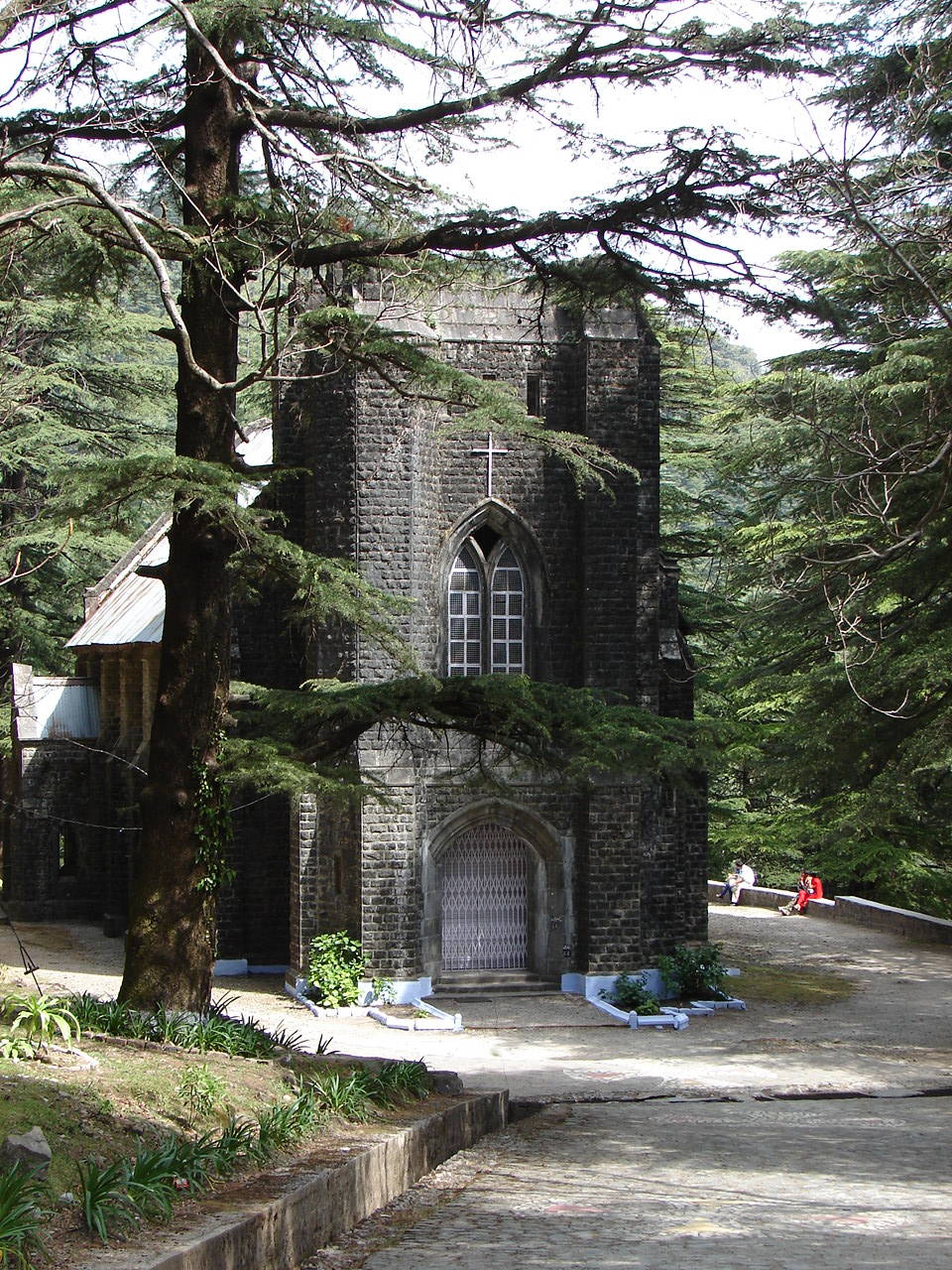
St. John in the Wilderness

St. John in the Wilderness is a Protestant church dedicated to John the Baptist. It was built in 1852 and is located near Dharamshala, India, on the way to McLeod Ganj, at Forsyth Gunj. Set amidst deodar forest, and built in neo-Gothic architecture, the Church is known for its Belgian stained-glass windows donated by Lady Elgin (Mary Louisa Lambton), wife of Lord Elgin. The Church is under Diocese of Amritsar. Rev.Raj Kumar is the presbyter in charge of this church

Though the church structure survived the 1905 Kangra earthquake, which killed close to 19,800 people, injured thousands in the Kangra area, and destroyed most buildings in Kangra, Mcleod Ganj and Dharamshala; its spire, Bell tower, was destroyed. Later, a new bell, cast in 1915 by Mears and Stainbank, was brought from England and installed outside in the compound of the church.

== Memorial ==
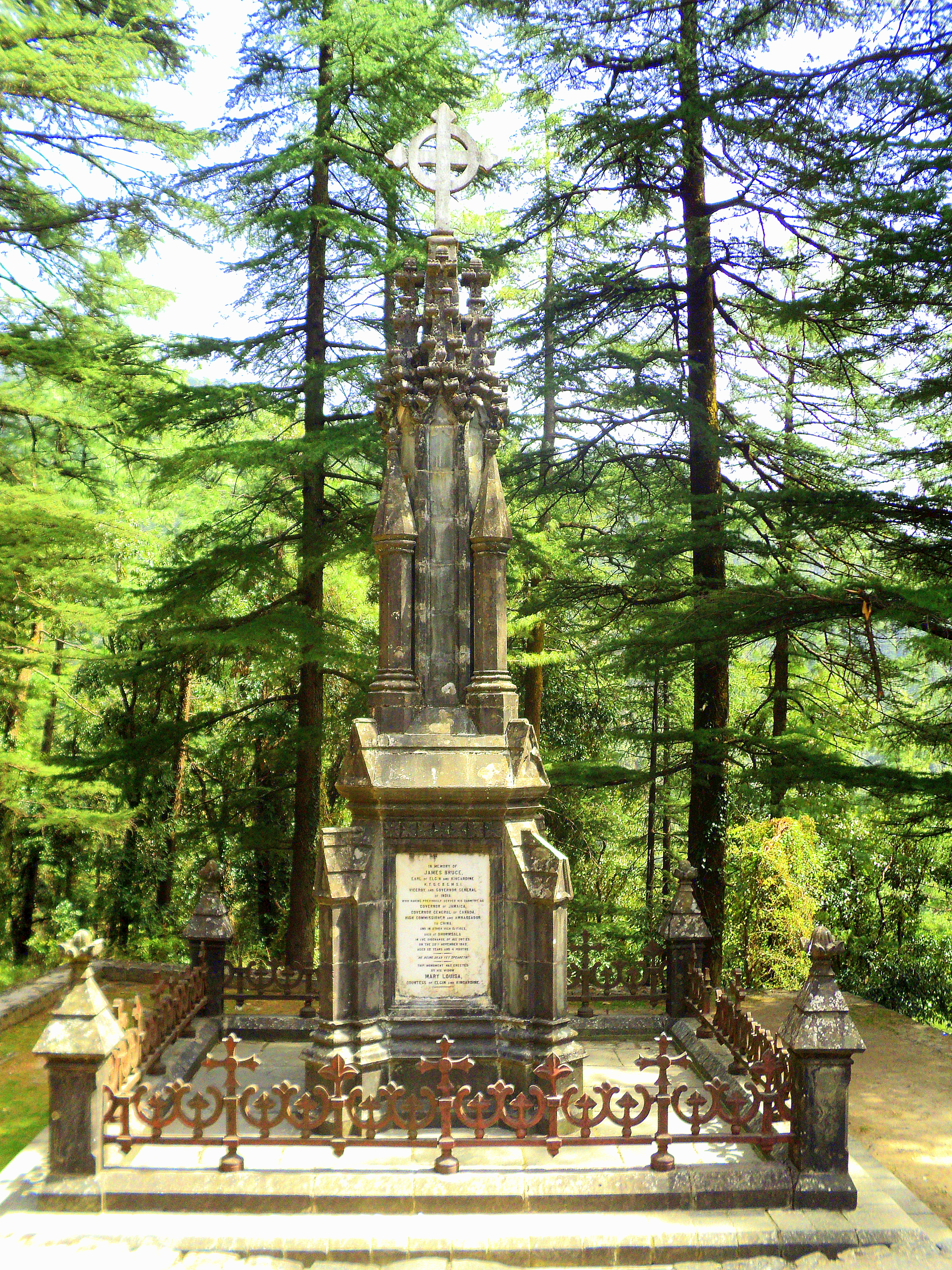
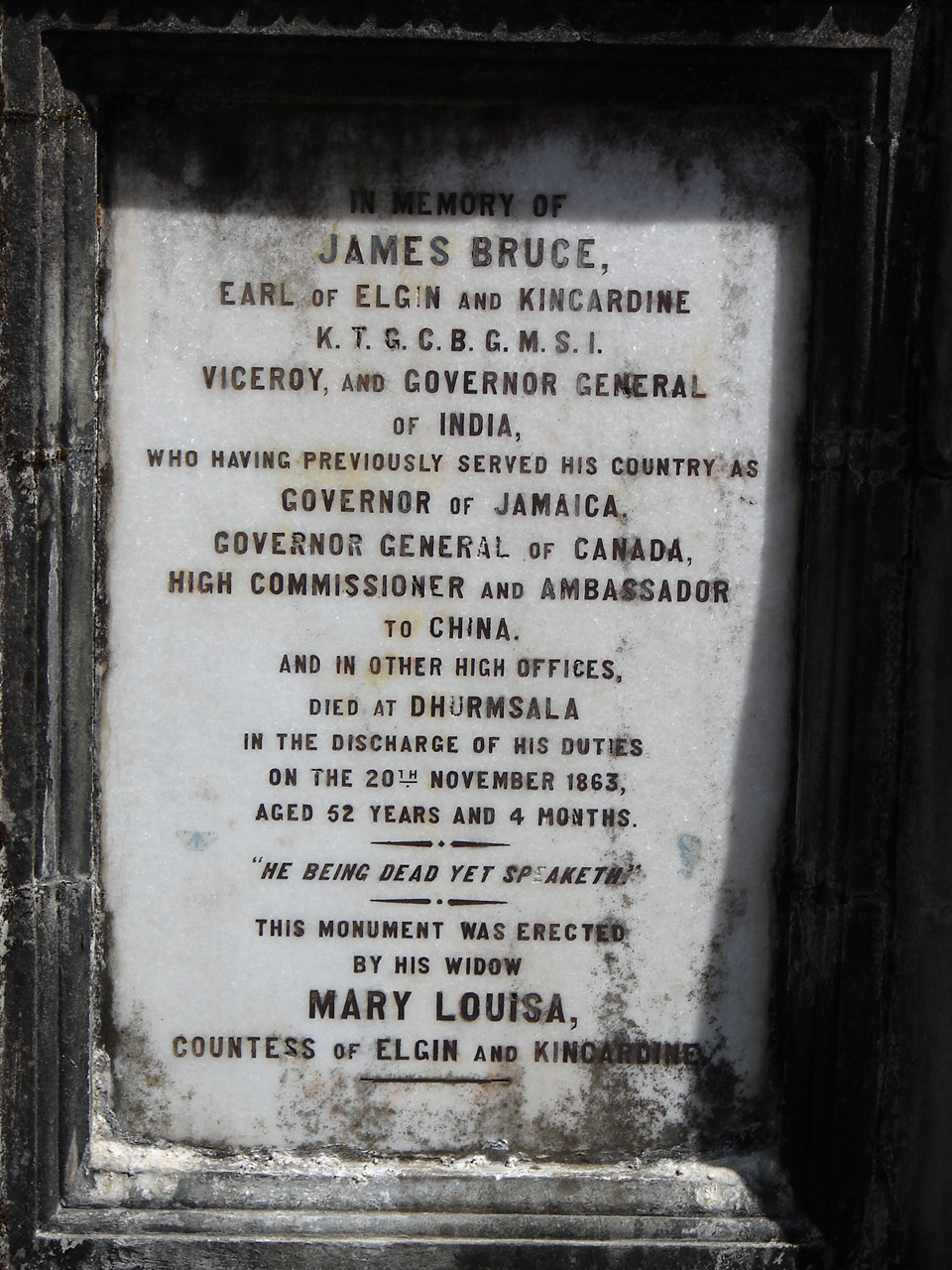
Grave memorial of James Bruce, 8th Earl of Elgin, Viceroy of India (1862–1863) at the church

Its churchyard is the final resting place of Lord Elgin, who served as Governor General of the Province of Canada, oversaw the creation of responsible government in Canada, and later, while in China, ordered the complete destruction of the Old Summer Palace. He became Governor-General & Viceroy of India in 1861 during the British Raj, though he soon died at Dharamshala on 20 November 1863, and was buried there.

== Gallery ==
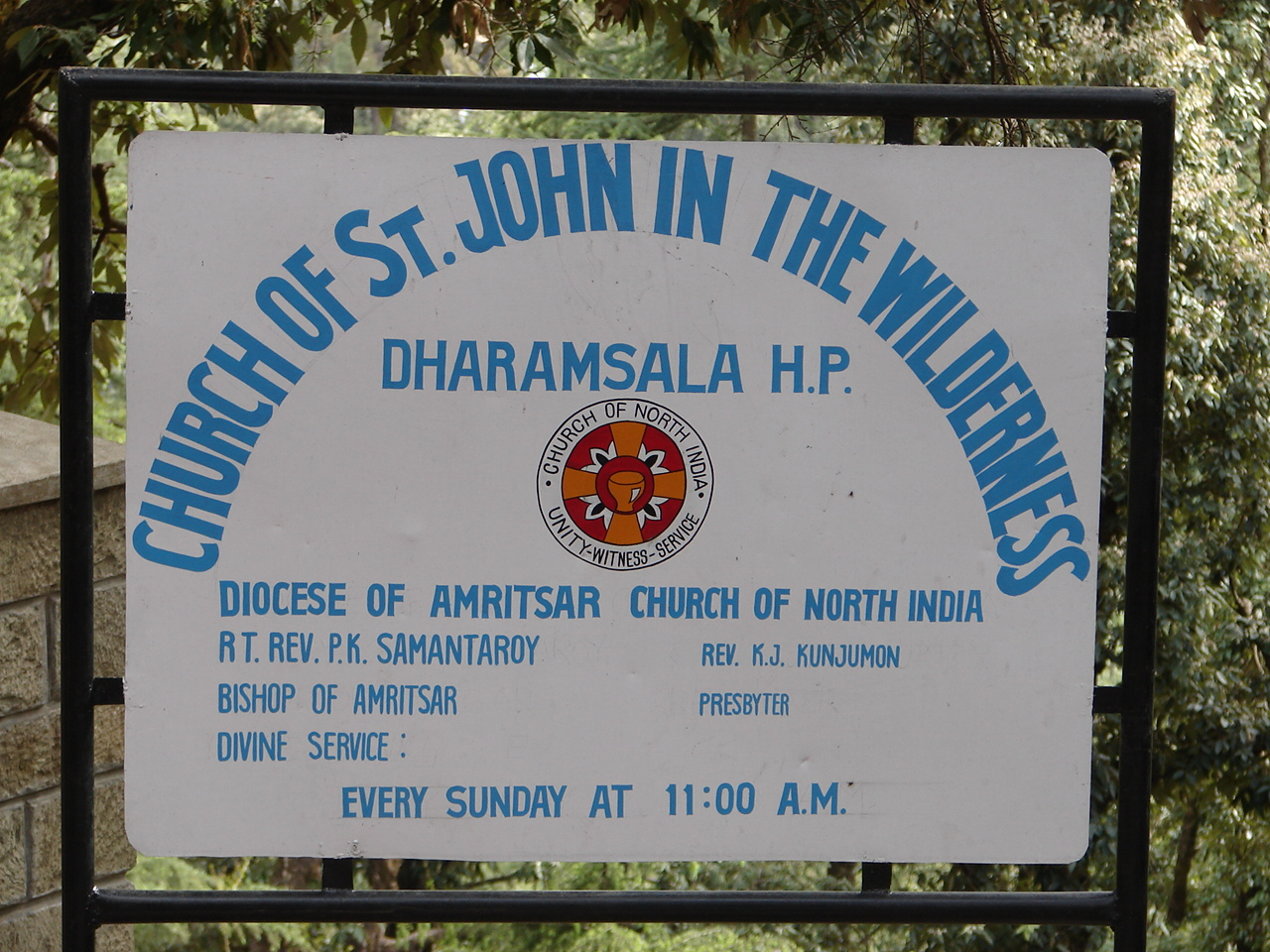
Church of St. John in the Wilderness.

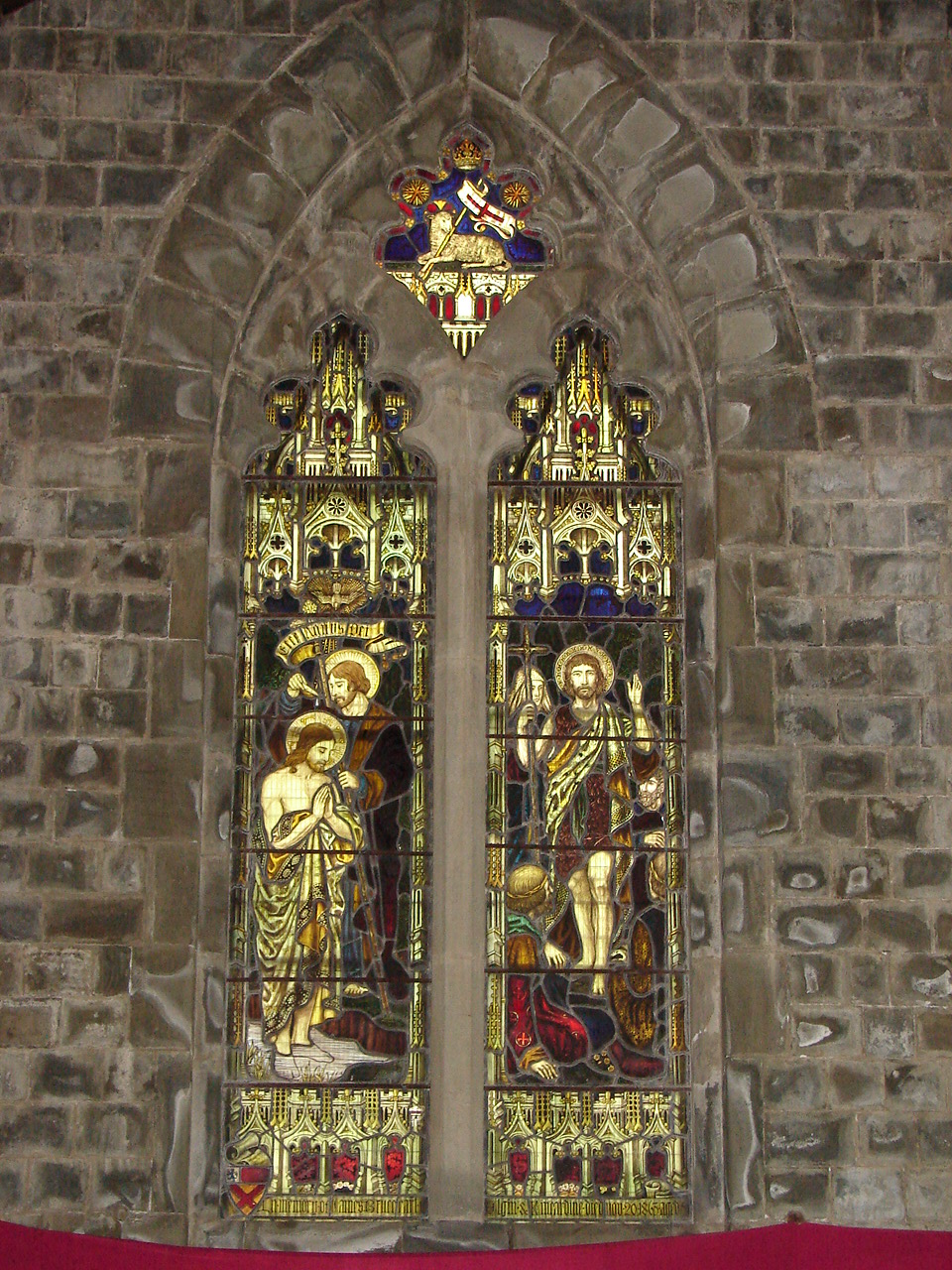
Stained glass window inside the church

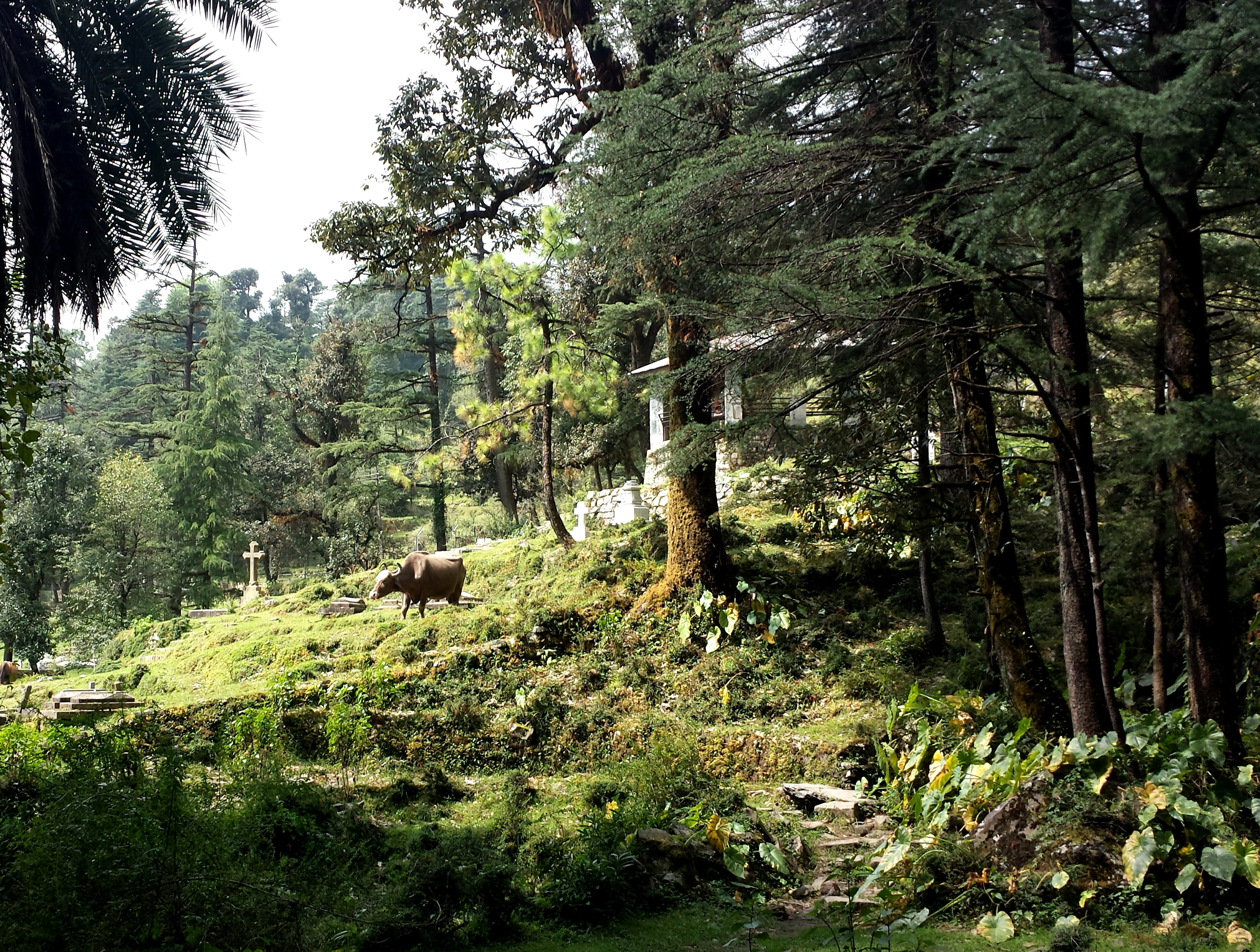
The churchyard

== Other church ==
There is a church by the same name in Nainital as well, built in 1844.
