= Eagan =

Eagan may refer to:

== People ==
- Charles Eagan (1921-2010), Canadian scientist
- Daisy Eagan (born 1979), American actress
- Dennis Eagan (1926–2012), British field hockey player
- Eddie Eagan (1897–1967), American sportsman
- Edmund Eagan, Canadian composer and musician
- James Eagan (1926-2000), American politician from Missouri
- John J. Eagan (politician) (1872–1956), American politician from New Jersey
- John J. Eagan (industrialist), American industrialist and co-founder of the American Cast Iron Pipe Company
- Kevin Eagan (born 1954), American soccer defender
- Margery Eagan (born 1954), American talk radio host
- Mireille Eagan (born 1982), Canadian arts writer and curator
- Truck Eagan (1877–1949), American baseball infielder
- James Eagan Holmes (born 1987), American mass murderer

== Places ==
- Eagan, Minnesota, United States, a suburb of Minneapolis-Saint Paul
- Eagan, Tennessee, United States, an unincorporated community
- Eagan, Kyle of Lochalsh, Scottish mountain

== See also ==
- Aegan
- Egan (disambiguation)
- Egen (disambiguation)
- Eagan (disambiguation)
