= James Bruce, 8th Earl of Elgin =

British colonial administrator and diplomat (1811–1863)

His Excellency The Right Honourable The Earl of Elgin KT GCB KSI PC FSA Scot
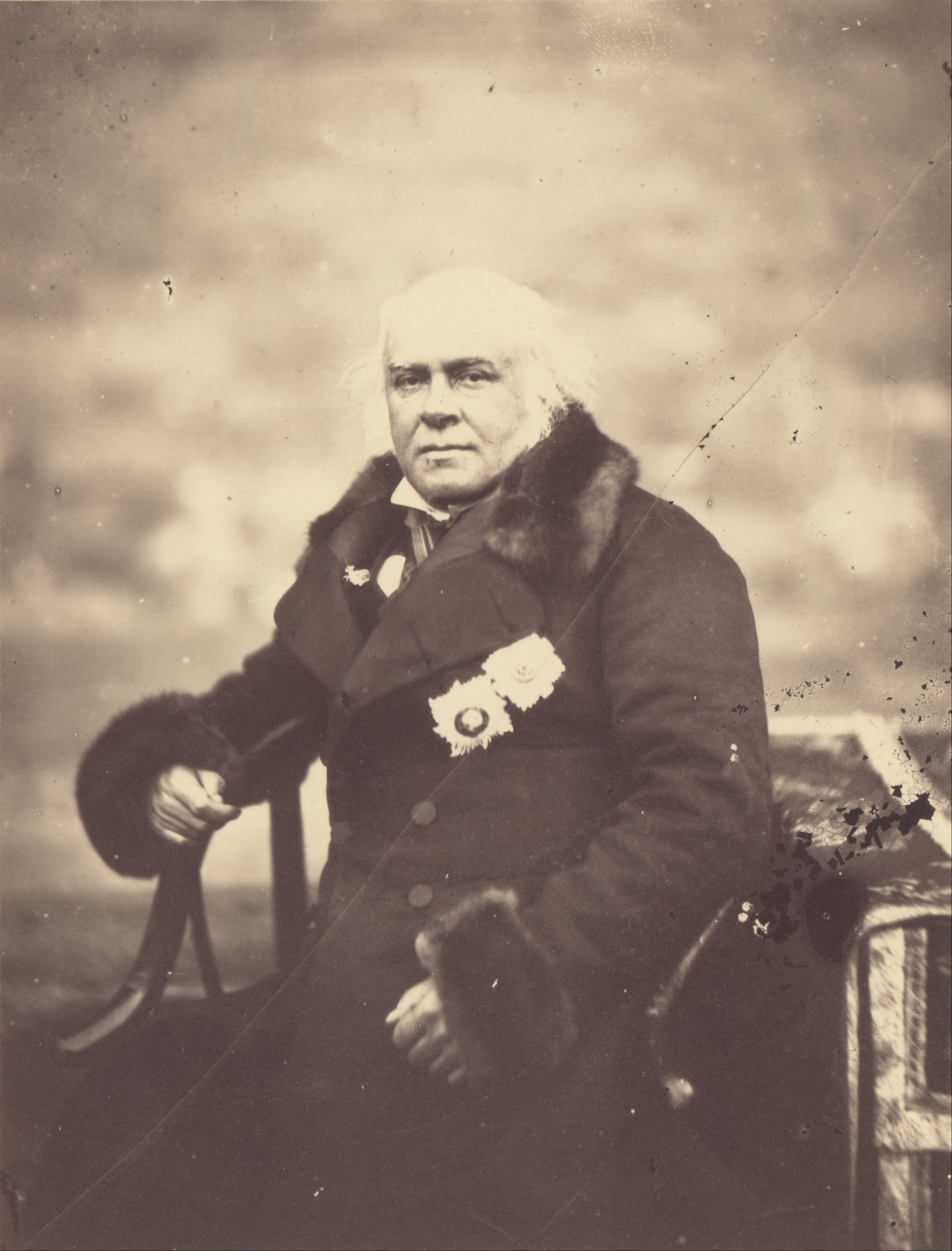
- The 8th Earl of Elgin, c. 1860

Viceroy and Governor-General of India
- In office 21 March 1862 – 20 November 1863
- Monarch: Victoria
- Preceded by: The Earl Canning
- Succeeded by: Sir Robert Napier; As Acting Governor-General

Governor General of the Province of Canada
- In office 1847–1854
- Monarch: Victoria
- Preceded by: The Earl Cathcart
- Succeeded by: Sir Edmund Walker Head

Governor of Jamaica
- In office 1842–1846
- Monarch: Victoria
- Preceded by: Sir Charles Metcalfe
- Succeeded by: George Berkeley; As Acting Governor

Personal details
- Born: 20 July 1811 London, England
- Died: 20 November 1863 (aged 52) Dharamshala, Punjab, British India
- Resting place: St. John in the Wilderness Church, Punjab, British India
- Spouses: Elizabeth Cumming-Bruce (m. 1841; died 1843); Lady Mary Lambton (m. 1846)
- Children: Victor Bruce, 9th Earl of Elgin
- Parents: Thomas Bruce, 7th Earl of Elgin (father); Elizabeth Oswald (mother)
- Education: Christ Church, Oxford

James Bruce, 8th Earl of Elgin and 12th Earl of Kincardine, KT, GCB, KCSI, PC, FSA Scot (20 July 1811 – 20 November 1863) was a British colonial administrator and diplomat. He served as Governor of Jamaica (1842–1846), Governor General of the Province of Canada (1847–1854), and Viceroy of India (1862–1863). He is also noted for his role during the Second Opium War.

In 1857, he was appointed High Commissioner and Plenipotentiary in China and the Far East to assist in the process of opening up China and Japan to Western trade. In 1860, during the Second Opium War in China, he ordered the destruction of the Old Summer Palace in Beijing, an architectural wonder with immeasurable collections of artworks and historic antiques, inflicting incalculable loss of cultural heritage. Subsequently, he compelled the Qing dynasty to sign the Convention of Peking, adding Kowloon Peninsula to the British crown colony of Hong Kong.

== Early life and education ==
Coats of arms of James Bruce

Lord Elgin was born in London on 20 July 1811, the son of the 7th Earl of Elgin and 11th Earl of Kincardine and his second wife, Elizabeth Oswald. He shared his birthday, 20 July, with his father. He had six brothers and sisters, and three half-sisters and one half-brother from his father's first marriage. Lord Elgin's father was reportedly impoverished by his acquisition of the Elgin Marbles; it had cost him a large amount of money to transport them, and he sold them to the British government at a significant loss.

James Bruce was educated at Eton College and Christ Church, Oxford, graduating with a first in Classics in 1832. While at Oxford, he became friends with William Ewart Gladstone.

== Career ==
He was elected at the 1841 general election as a Member of Parliament for Southampton, but the election was declared void on petition. He did not stand in the resulting by-election. In November 1841, on the death of his father, he succeeded as 8th Earl of Elgin.

=== Jamaica ===
James Bruce became Governor of Jamaica in 1842, During an administration of four years he succeeded in winning the respect of all. He improved the condition of the Afro-Caribbean workers, and conciliated the white planters by working through them.

=== Canada ===
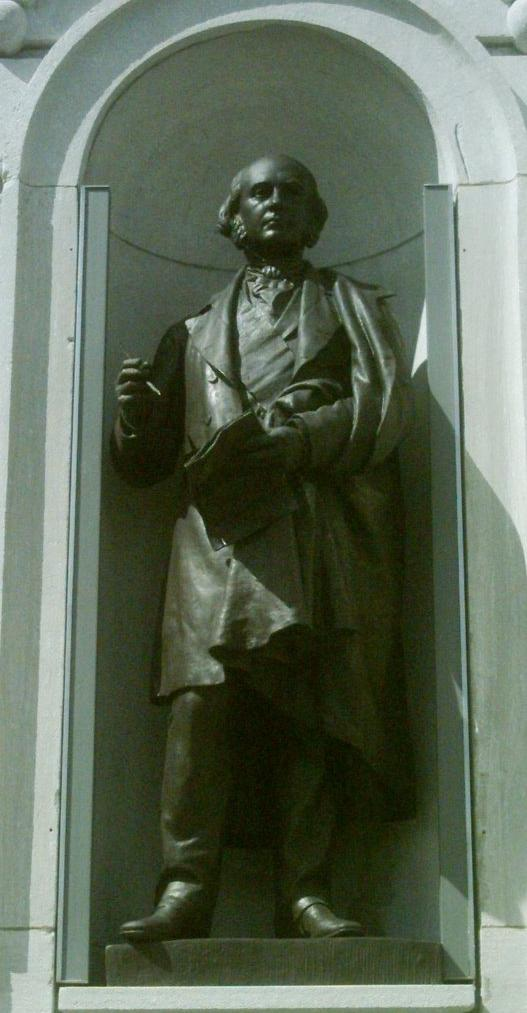
Statue of Elgin in front of the Parliament Building in Quebec

In 1847 he was appointed Governor General of the Province of Canada by the Secretary of State for War and the Colonies, Henry Grey, 3rd Earl Grey, in the administration of Lord John Russell. Under Lord Elgin, the first real attempts began at establishing responsible government in Canada. Lord Elgin became the first Governor General to distance himself from the affairs of the legislature. Since then, the Governor-General has had a largely symbolic role with regards to the political affairs of the country. As Governor-General, he wrestled with the costs of receiving high levels of immigration in the Canadas, a major issue in the constant debate about immigration during the 19th century.

In 1849 the Baldwin-Lafontaine government passed the Rebellion Losses Bill, compensating French Canadians for losses suffered during the Rebellions of 1837. Lord Elgin granted royal assent to the bill despite heated Tory opposition and his own misgivings over how his action would be received in England. The decision sparked the Burning of the Parliament Buildings in Montreal by an English-speaking mob. Elgin was assaulted. Instead of calling in the military, he withdrew his family to their country residence and allowed civil authorities to restore order. Due to his relations with the United States, his support of the self-government and defence of the colony, and his settlement of the free-trade and fishery questions, he was raised to the peerage as Baron Elgin in 1849.

Also in 1849, the Stony Monday Riot took place in Bytown on Monday 17 September. Tories and Reformists clashed over the planned visit of Lord Elgin, one man was killed and many sustained injuries. Two days later, the two political factions, armed with cannon, muskets and pistols faced off on the Sappers Bridge. Although the conflict was defused in time by the military, a general support for the Crown's representative triumphed in Bytown (renamed Ottawa by Queen Victoria in 1854). In 1854, Lord Elgin negotiated the Reciprocity Treaty with the United States in an attempt to stimulate the Canadian economy. Later that year, he granted royal assent to the law that abolished the seigneurial system in Quebec, and then resigned as Governor-General.

Elgin supported the Bagot Report, which was published in 1847 by Governor General Charles Bagot, and which is seen as the foundational document for the Canadian Indian residential school system. Elgin had been impressed by industrial schools he had seen while in the West Indies.

Soon after his return to England in 1854, Lord Palmerston offered him a seat in the cabinet as Chancellor of the Duchy of Lancaster, which he declined.

=== China and Japan ===
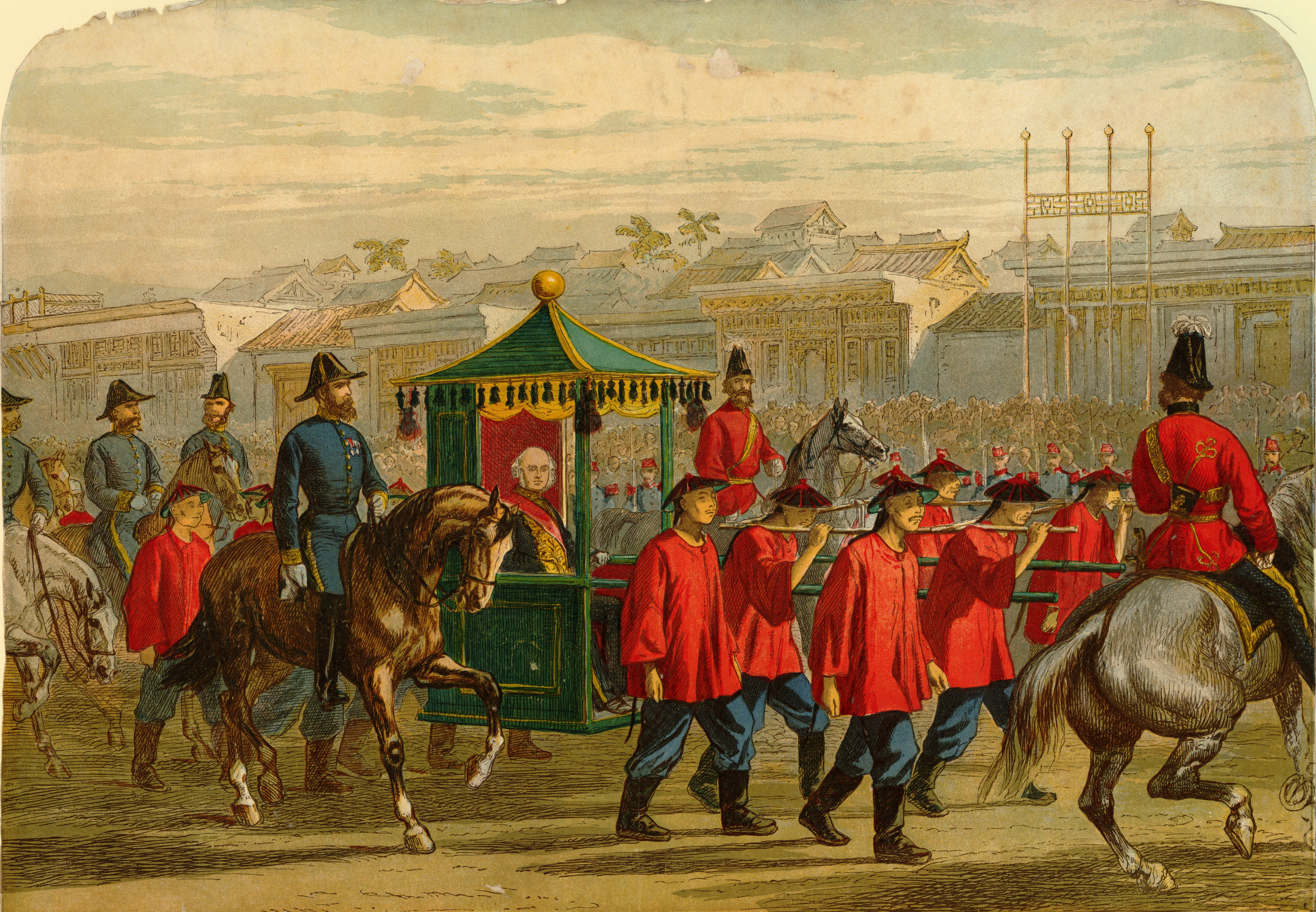
Entry of Lord Elgin into Peking, 1860

In 1857, Lord Elgin was appointed High Commissioner and Plenipotentiary in China and the Far East to assist in the process of opening up China and Japan to Western trade. During the Second Opium War, he ordered the bombardment of Canton (Guangzhou).

In 1858, while passing through Nanjing, Lord Elgin was presented a poetic message by Hong Xiuquan, in which the self-styled Heavenly King referred to him as "our foreign younger brother of the Western Seas." Hong invited Lord Elgin to join his rebellion: "Let us together serve God and our Elder Brother, and destroy the hateful insects." Lord Elgin saw the invitation as a "strange document," and furthermore noted it would "be awkward for me to have any intercourse with the rebel chiefs"; he did not land.

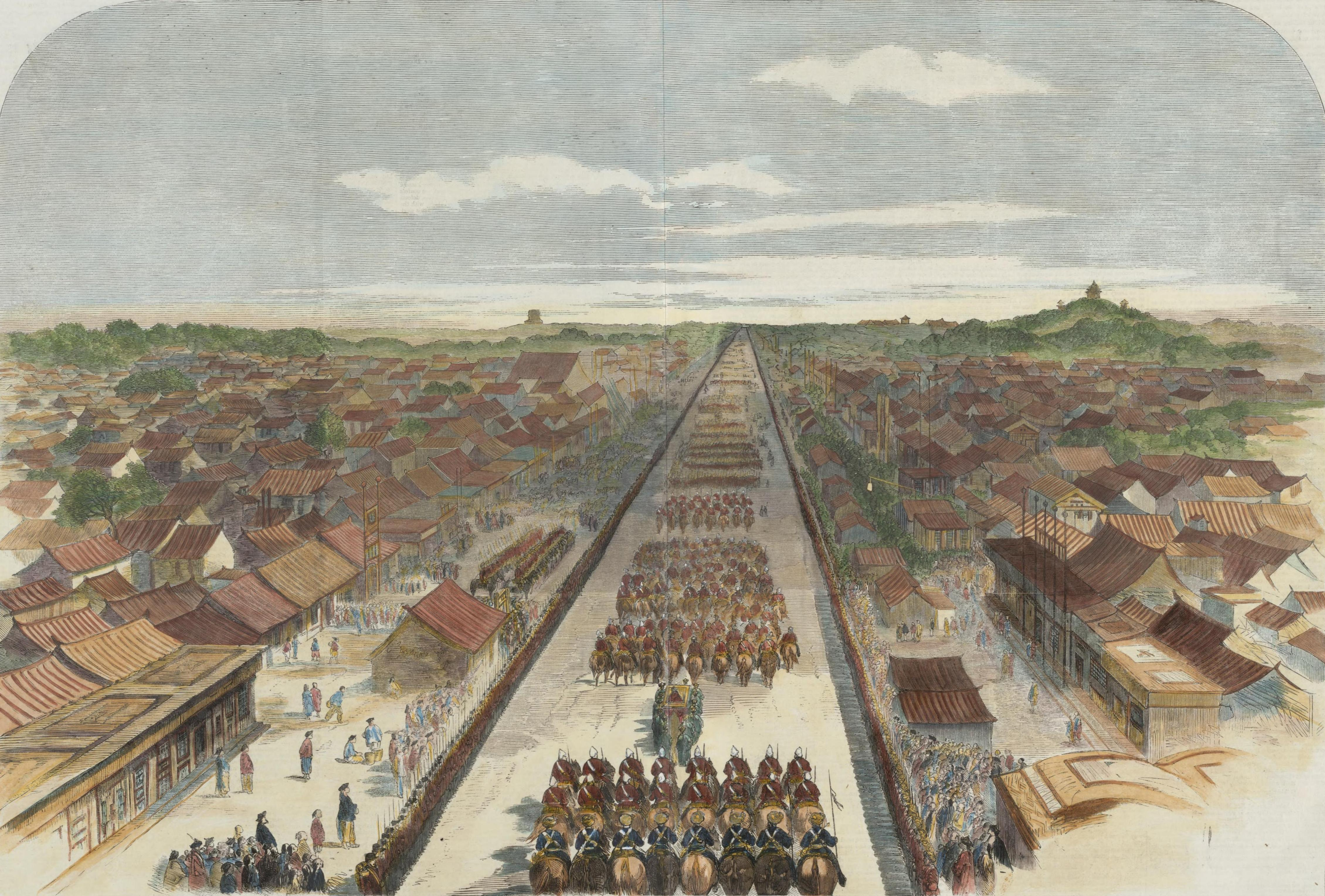
Lord Elgin's procession in Peking.

Lord Elgin oversaw the end of the Second Opium War. He signed the Treaty of Tientsin (Tianjin) on 26 June 1858. However, Chinese troops continued to attack British positions in 1859. So Lord Russell sent Lord Elgin back to China as ambassador extraordinary to demand an apology for these attacks, the execution of the treaty, and an indemnity for the military and naval expenditure. In June 1860, Lord Elgin arrived in China to direct additional British attacks, accompanied by his brother Frederick as principal secretary. On 18 October 1860, not having received the Chinese surrender and wishing to spare the imperial capital of Peking (Beijing), he ordered the complete destruction of the Old Summer Palace (Yuanming Yuan) outside the city in retaliation for the torture and execution of almost twenty European and Indian prisoners, including two British envoys and The Times journalist Thomas Bowlby. The Old Summer Palace was a complex of palaces and gardens eight kilometres northwest of the walls of Beijing; it had been built during the 18th and early 19th centuries, and was where the emperors of the Qing dynasty resided and handled government affairs. An alternative account says that Lord Elgin had initially considered the destruction of the Forbidden City. However, fearing that this act might interfere with the signing of the Convention of Peking, which was where it was being negotiated, he opted for the destruction of the Old Summer Palace instead.

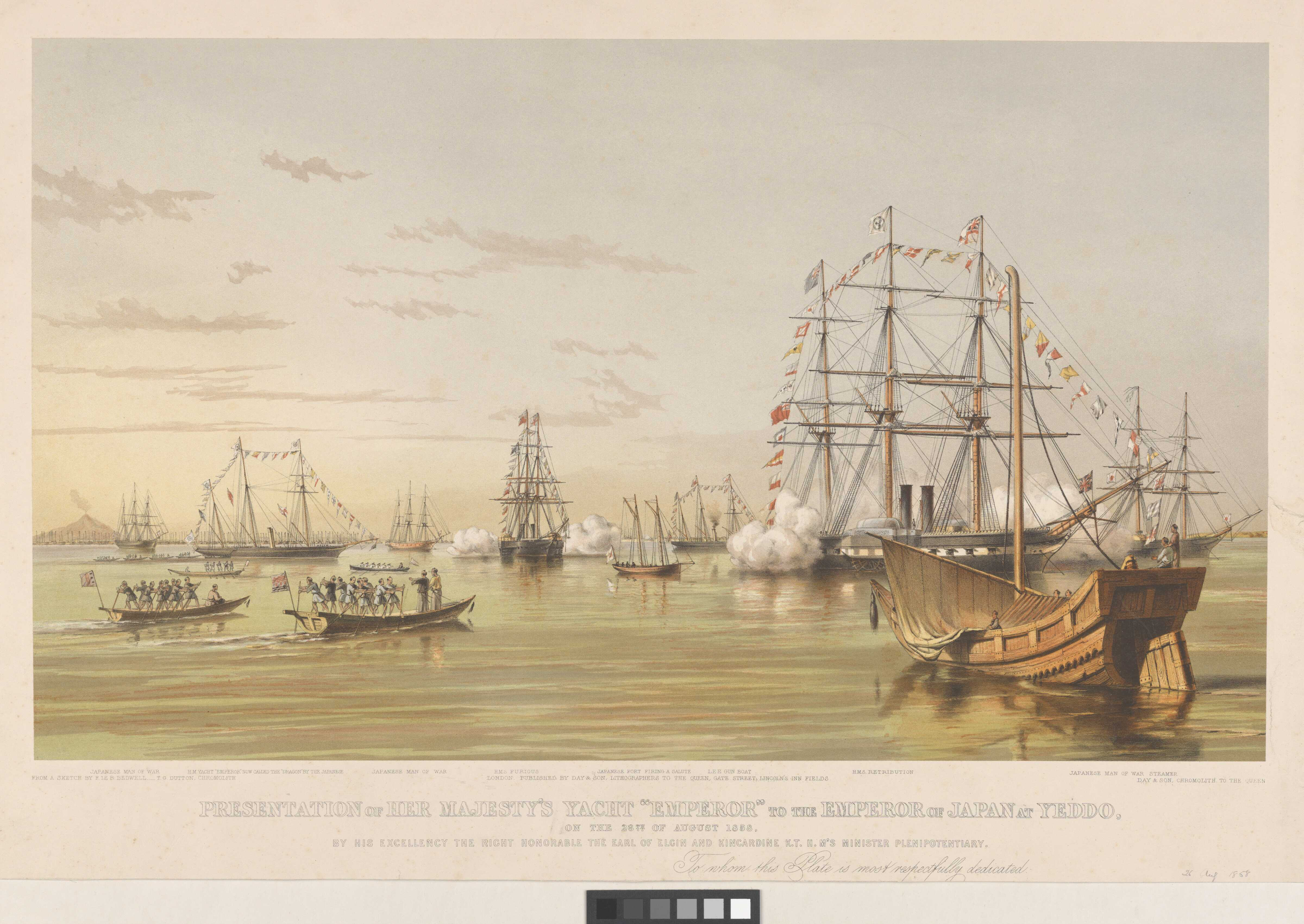
Presentation of HMY Emperor

The Old Summer Palace was set ablaze by a force of Anglo-French troops. The troops hurriedly looted the imperial collections in the palace before it finished burning. Attacks on the nearby Summer Palace (Qingyi Yuan) were also made, but the extent of destruction was not as great as to the Old Summer Palace. On 24 October 1860, Lord Elgin signed the Convention of Peking, which stipulated that China was to cede part of Kowloon Peninsula and Hong Kong in perpetuity to Britain. According to historian Olive Checkland, Lord Elgin "was ambivalent about the British imperial policy of forcing trade on the peoples in China and Japan. He deplored what he called the 'commercial ruffianism' which effectively determined British policy responses." In a letter to his wife, in regard to the bombing of Canton, he wrote, "I never felt so ashamed of myself in my life."

In between Lord Elgin's two trips to China, he had visited Japan. In August 1858, he signed the Treaty of Amity and Commerce, whose negotiation was much eased by the recent Harris Treaty between Japan and the United States. He would also present the Tokugawa administration the HMY Emperor, a modern and luxuriously appointed steam powered yacht as a present for the Shōgun from Queen Victoria to commemorate the signing of the treaty.

=== India ===
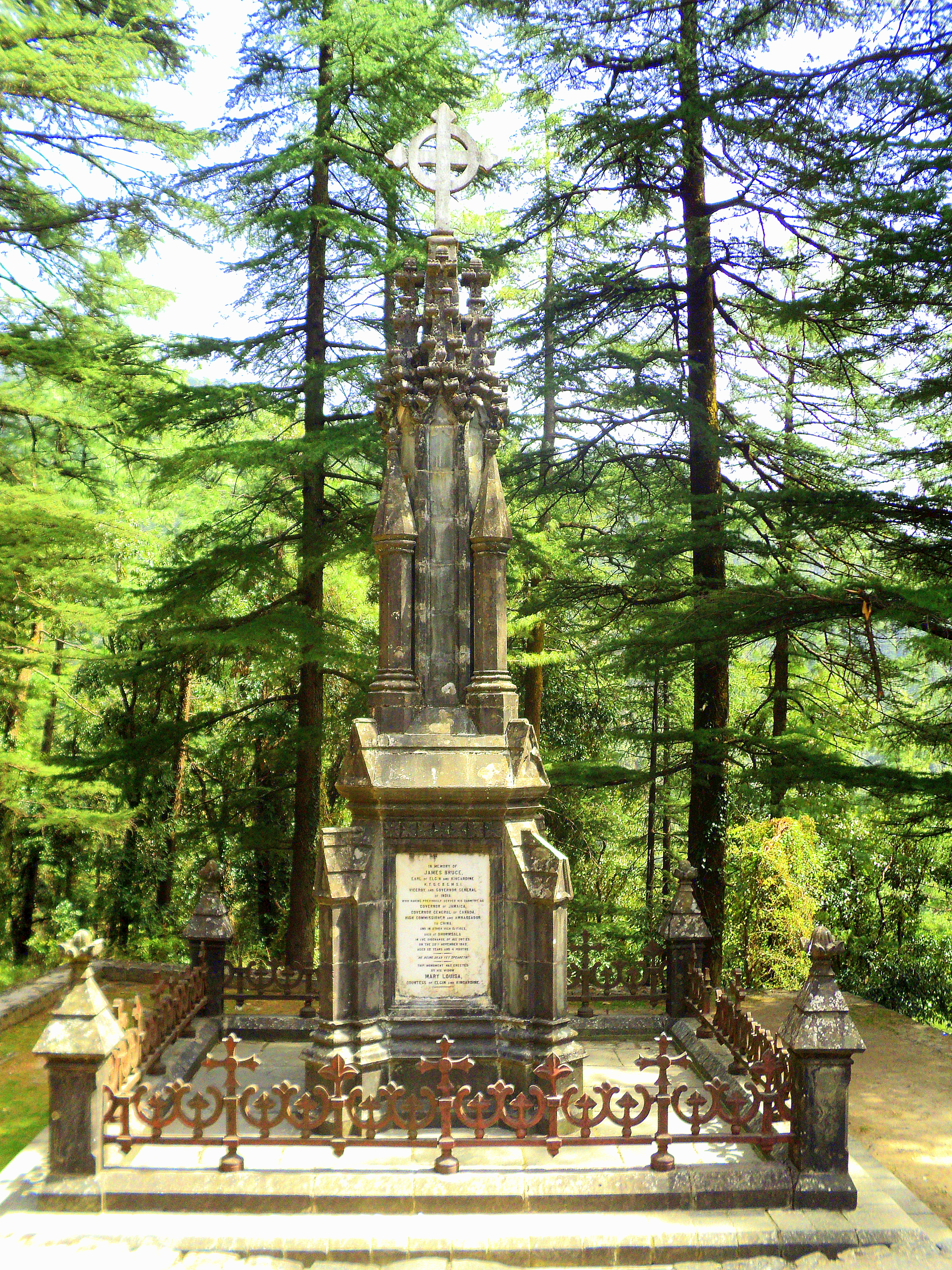
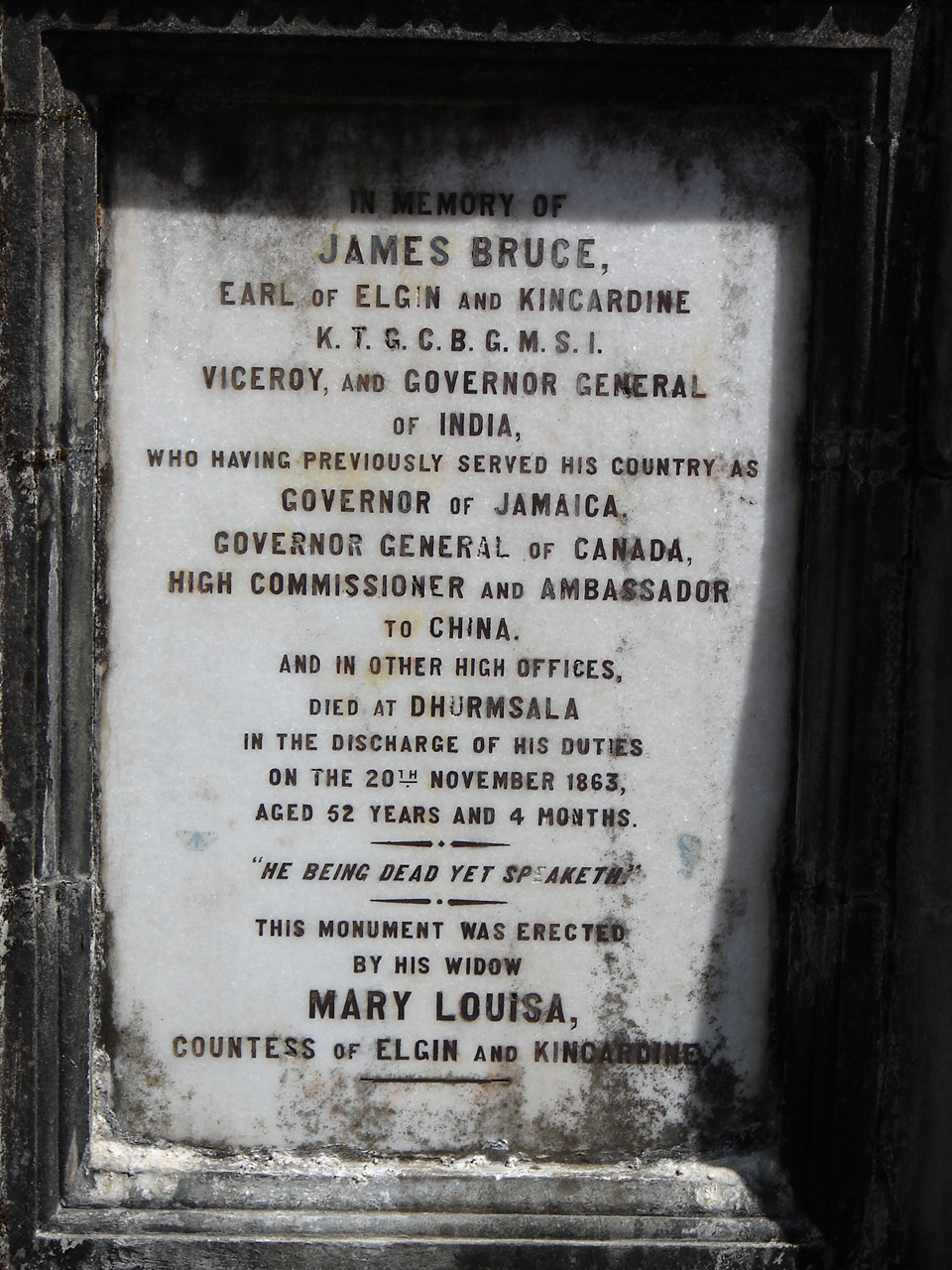
Grave memorial at St. John in the Wilderness church in Dharamsala

Within a month of Elgin's return to England, Lord Palmerston selected him to be viceroy and governor-general of India. He became viceroy in 1862, the first viceroy directly appointed by the Crown, and as subject to the Secretary of State for India. Elgin tried to hold the Dutch in Sumatra in check, and marched a force to the Peshawar border to enforce earlier treaties.

He was the first to use Peterhoff, Shimla as the official residence of the Viceroy. In 1863, he was travelling from there to Sialkot, an arduous journey at a high elevation which exhausted him. He died in 1863 of a heart attack while crossing a swinging rope and wood bridge over the river Chadly, on the lap between Kullu and Lahul. He was buried in the churchyard of St. John in the Wilderness in Dharamshala.

== Marriage and issue ==
Elgin married Elizabeth Mary Cumming-Bruce, the only child of MP Charles Lennox Cumming-Bruce, on 22 April 1841. The marriage was short lived, his wife dying shortly after the birth of their second daughter on 7 June 1843 in Jamaica. They had, along with another daughter:

- Lady Elma Bruce (1842–1923), married in 1864 the 5th Baron Thurlow.

On 7 November 1846, Elgin married Lady Mary Louisa Lambton, daughter of the 1st Earl of Durham, a prominent author of the Report on the Affairs of British North America (1839) (as well as Governor General of the Canadas), and niece of the Colonial Secretary the 3rd Earl Grey (who was uncle to Albert Grey, 4th Earl Grey, later Governor General of Canada). They had four sons and a daughter:

- Victor Bruce, 9th Earl of Elgin (1849–1917)
- Hon. Robert Preston Bruce (1851–1893), MP for Fife and W. Fife
- Hon. Frederick John Bruce (1854–1920), Page of Honour to Queen Victoria 1869–71, married in 1879 Katherine Bruce Fernie, and had four sons and four daughters.
- Lady Louisa Elizabeth Bruce (1856–1902), unmarried

== Legacy ==
In Ontario, the towns of Mount Elgin, Kincardine, Port Elgin, and Bruce Mines, along with Bruce County and Elgin County are named for the 8th Earl. The long Bruce Peninsula into Lake Huron, and the communities of Elgin, New Brunswick, and Elgin, Nova Scotia, are also named for him. There are numerous Elgin Roads and Elgin Streets in Canada and in India.

The Elgin Bridge in Singapore, and Elgin Street, Carlton, State of Victoria, and Elgin Street, Hong Kong, are also named for Bruce, as is the Lord Elgin Hotel in Ottawa.

Elgin's legacy in Canada was the subject of a National Film Board of Canada short docudrama, Lord Elgin: Voice of the People (1959), directed by Julian Biggs.

While China has opened up to French relations, the sale of Chinese art and artifacts in British auctions remains a point of tension between London and Beijing. However, all zodiac animal heads from the Summer Palace that have been found have been returned to the Beijing Poly Museum.

== See also ==
- Anglo-Chinese relations
- Anglo-Japanese relations

== Sources ==
- Narrative of the Earl of Elgin's Mission to China and Japan, 1857-8-9 (2 volumes), Laurence Oliphant, 1859 (reprinted by Oxford University Press, 1970) {No ISBN}
- Checkland, S.G. (1988). The Elgins 1766-1917: A Tale of Aristocrats, Proconsuls and Their Wives. Aberdeen: Aberdeen University Press. ISBN 0-08-036395-4.
- Harris, David; Van Slyke, Lyman P. (2000). Of Battle and Beauty: Felice Beato's Photographs of China. University of California Press. ISBN 0-89951-100-7.
- Hevia, James L. (2003). English Lessons: The Pedagogy of Imperialism in Nineteenth-Century China. Durham: Duke University Press.
- "Moving Here, Staying Here:" The Canadian Immigrant Experience, Library and Archives Canada, A letter from Lord Elgin, Governor General of the Canadas, to the Colonial Office
- Morison, John Lyle (1928). The Eighth Earl of Elgin : A Chapter in Nineteenth-century Imperial History. London: Hodder and Stoughton.
- Morton, W. L. (1976). "Bruce, James, 8th Earl of Elgin and 12th Earl of Kincardine". In Halpenny, Francess G. (ed.). Dictionary of Canadian Biography. Vol. IX (1861–1870) (online ed.). University of Toronto Press.
- Newsinger, John (June 2002). "Elgin in China". The New Left Review.
- Wrong, George M. (1906). The Earl of Elgin. Toronto: G.N. Morangi. Also digitized by Canadian Institute for Historical Microreproductions, 2003.

Parliament of the United Kingdom
Preceded by Abel Rous Dottin; Viscount Duncan	Member of Parliament for Southampton; 1841–1842; With: Charles Cecil Martyn	Succeeded by Humphrey St John-Mildmay; George William Hope
Political offices
Preceded by The Lord Colchester	Postmaster General; 1859–1860	Succeeded by The Lord Stanley of Alderley
Government offices
Preceded by Sir Charles Metcalfe, Bt	Governor of Jamaica; 1842–1846	Succeeded by George Berkeley (acting)
Preceded by The Earl Cathcart	Governor General of the Province of Canada; 1847–1854	Succeeded by Sir Edmund Walker Head, Bt
Preceded by The Earl Canning	Viceroy of India; 1862–1863	Succeeded by Sir Robert Napier (acting)
Honorary titles
Preceded by James Erskine Wemyss	Lord Lieutenant of Fife; 1854–1863	Succeeded by James Hay Erskine Wemyss
Academic offices
Preceded by The Earl Cathcart	Chancellor of King's College; 1847–1849	Succeeded by Peter Boyle de Blaquière (as Chancellor of the University of Toronto)
Preceded by The Lord Lytton	Rector of the University of Glasgow; 1859–1862	Succeeded by The Viscount Palmerston
Peerage of Scotland
Preceded by Thomas Bruce	Earl of Elgin; Earl of Kincardine; 1841–1863	Succeeded by Victor Bruce
Peerage of the United Kingdom
New creation	Baron Elgin; 1849–1863	Succeeded by Victor Bruce
