= Egan (given name) =

Egan is a masculine given name which is borne by:

- Egan (Paiute), American name of Northern Paiute Indian leader Pony Blanket (died 1878)
- Egan Adams (born 1959), American former tennis player
- Egan Bernal (born 1997), Colombian road cyclist
- Egan Butcher (born 2000), Australian rugby league footballer
- Egan Chambers (1921–1994), Canadian politician
- Egan Frantz (born 1986), American Artist
- Egan Walker (born 1961), American lawyer and judge
