= Elgin Township =

Elgin Township may refer to the following townships in the United States:

- Elgin Township, Kane County, Illinois
- Elgin Township, Wabasha County, Minnesota
- Elgin Township, Antelope County, Nebraska
