= Elgin, Nova Scotia =

Community in Nova Scotia, Canada

Coordinates: 45°25′23.79″N 62°40′12.18″W

Elgin in Nova Scotia

Elgin (Scottish Gaelic: Eilginn) is a community in the Canadian province of Nova Scotia, located in Pictou County. It is named after James Bruce, 8th Earl of Elgin, and the city of Elgin in Scotland.
