= Elg =

Elg or ELG may refer to:

== People ==
- Danette Elg (1952–1984), American murder victim
- Jarno Elg (born 1975), Finnish convict
- Taina Elg (1930–2025), Finnish-American actress and dancer
- Øivind Elgenes (born 1958), Norwegian singer

== Transportation ==
- El Golea Airport, in Algeria
- Elgin railway station, in Scotland
- Alpi Eagles, an Italian airline

== Other uses ==
- Effluent limitation guidelines
- ElGamal encryption
