= Egan Walker =

American judge

Egan K. Walker

Judge for the Second Judicial District Court of Nevada (7th Department)
- Incumbent
- Assumed office December 29, 2017
- Appointed by: Brian Sandoval
- Preceded by: N. Patrick Flanagan III

Presiding Judge for the Second Judicial District Court of Nevada (2nd Department)
- In office March 10, 2011 – December 29, 2017
- Appointed by: Brian Sandoval
- Preceded by: David A. Hardy
- Succeeded by: Dixie R. Gossman

Personal details
- Born: Egan Kirk Walker; November 21, 1961 (age 64) Independence, Missouri, U.S.
- Education: University of Nevada, Reno (BSN); University of the Pacific (JD)

Military service
- Branch/service: United States Army
- Years of service: 1981-1990
- Rank: Sergeant (enlisted); Second Lieutenant (commissioned)
- Unit: California Army National Guard; Nevada Army National Guard; Army Reserve; Army Nurse Corps; 1150th Medical Evacuation Unit

Egan Kirk Walker (born November 21, 1961, in Independence, Missouri) is an American lawyer and judge from Nevada. He is a judge in the General Jurisdiction of the Second Judicial District Court of the State of Nevada. He was appointed to this role by Governor Brian Sandoval on December 20, 2017. Prior to this appointment he had served in the family division of the same court for nine years.

== Early life and career ==
Born in Missouri in 1961, Judge Walker attended high school in Stockton, California before joining the Army National Guard and Army Reserve in 1982, where he worked primarily as a flight medic. Upon completing a BSN at the University of Nevada, Reno in 1986, he then worked as an RN in critical care while attending the McGeorge School of Law.

Upon receiving a J.D. in 1991, he then worked as a deputy district attorney in Carson City, Nevada. In 1995, he moved to the Washoe County District Attorney's office and served there as part of the county's Major Violators unit.

From 2000 to 2008, Judge Walker worked in private legal practice in Reno, NV. During this time he successfully participated in securing a $590 million verdict against convicted murderer Darren Mack on behalf of his victims' family.

== Judicial career ==
From 2009 to 2011, Judge Walker was appointed and served as a Family Court Master. In 2011, after Judge David Hardy was appointed to Department 15, Nevada Governor Brian Sandoval appointed Judge Walker to the vacancy in the Family Division of the Second Judicial District Court in Department 2. He ran unopposed for this seat in 2012 and 2014 respectively.

== Family Court Service ==
While working in the Family Division, Judge Walker was responsible for juvenile delinquency and dependency cases, guardianship and divorce cases, and custody and child support issues.

Judge Walker is a member of numerous state and national judicial boards, and has worked on several state commissions on subjects such as guardianship and the Nevada Children's Commission. In 2017, he was elected to the NCJFCJ (National Council of Juvenile and Family Court Judges) as secretary of the board of directors.

== General Jurisdiction Court Service ==
Following the death of Judge Patrick Flanagan, Governor Sandoval appointed Judge Walker to fill the now empty seat in Department 7 on December 29, 2017.

== Personal life ==
Judge Walker is married and has 6 children. He has been a resident of Reno, Nevada since 1991.
