= Frederick I. Eglin =

United States Army officer (1891–1937)

Frederick Irving Eglin
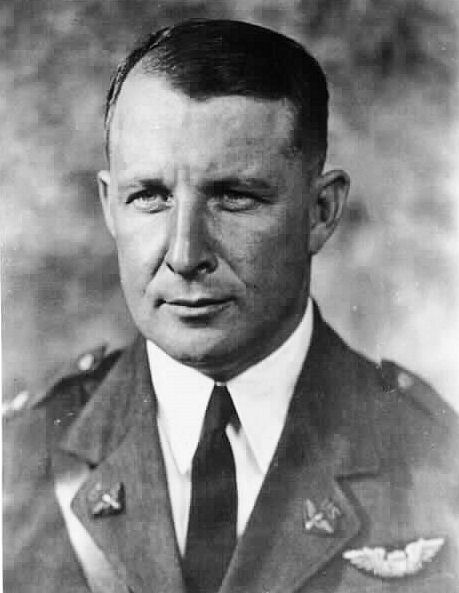
- Frederick I. Eglin
- Born: February 23, 1891; New York, New York, U.S.
- Died: January 1, 1937 (aged 45); Cheaha Mountain, Alabama, U.S.
- Burial place: Arlington National Cemetery
- Military career
- Allegiance: United States
- Branch: United States Army Air Corps
- Service years: 1916-1937
- Rank: Lieutenant colonel

Frederick Irving Eglin (February 23, 1891 – January 1, 1937) was a career officer in the United States Army Air Service and United States Army Air Corps. He was killed in an air crash on January 1, 1937, and Eglin Field (later Eglin Air Force Base), Florida, was named in his honor on August 4, 1937.

Eglin joined the Indiana National Guard in 1911 while a student at Wabash College, and first began federal service in June 1916, serving on the U.S. border with Mexico. In 1917 he was commissioned in the Indiana Guard after the United States entered World War I and was assigned to pilot training. After earning his rating as a pilot and a commission in the Aviation Section, U.S. Signal Corps, Eglin remained at the school as a flying instructor. Eglin received a regular commission in the Air Service on July 1, 1920, and commanded several squadrons in the United States and the Philippines.

He served three years as a senior instructor and commander at the Advanced Flying School at Kelly Field, Texas, after which he studied at both the Air Corps Tactical School (ACTS) and the Command and General Staff College. After a four-year tour at the ACTS as an instructor and department director, Eglin was promoted to lieutenant colonel and assigned to the headquarters of the GHQ Air Force, where he was serving as a staff officer at the time of his death.

== Early years ==
Eglin, born in New York City on February 23, 1891, was orphaned at a young age. He was educated through high school in New York, but was admitted to Wabash College in Crawfordsville, Indiana, through the intercession of a Wabash alumnus. He was a multi-sport college athlete, playing halfback in football, forward in basketball, and the middle infield in baseball. He also became a member of Delta Tau Delta fraternity during his time at Wabash. Among his friends were classmate Kent Lambert, a Crawfordsville native who became a career Army officer, and his brother Ward Lambert, who became head basketball coach at Purdue University. Eglin graduated from Wabash with the class of 1914, took up residence in Crawfordsville, and became Wabash's athletics director.

During his freshman year at Wabash, Eglin enlisted in the Indiana National Guard, advancing while a student from private to sergeant in Company B, 2nd Indiana Infantry, a unit that traced its history to the Battle of Tippecanoe. In 1914, shortly before graduation, he was appointed Regimental Sergeant Major on March 4, 1914, serving in that capacity until his commissioning in 1917.

He also met and married Mary Lucille Oda, also of Crawfordsville. They had two children, Frederick Junior, born November 19, 1922, and Harriet Jane, born in 1925. Lucille Eglin was an artist known to many in the Air Corps as the unofficial "Artist of the Air Corps" from the landscapes and official portraits she painted over the signature "MO Eglin" at their varied duty stations. Lucille Eglin perished in a house fire in Washington D.C. two years to the day after her husband's death and was buried next to him at Arlington National Cemetery. Their daughter is buried with them in Arlington.

Eglin's son, Frederick Eglin Jr. graduated from West Point in 1944, became a pilot in the United States Army Air Forces, and flew Boeing B-17 Flying Fortresses with the 401st Bomb Group in England during World War II.

== Service during World War I ==
As previously noted, while a student at Wabash College, Eglin had enlisted and served in the National Guard. When the United States entered World War I in April 1917, Eglin earned a Reserve commission in the U.S. Army as a Second Lieutenant and was sent off to pilot training. Awarded his wings, he was subsequently tendered a Regular commission in the U.S. Army Air Service. However, like many American military fliers during the war years, he was unable to get a combat assignment to Europe prior to the November 1918 Armistice and remained stateside as an instructor pilot.

== Death ==
On January 1, 1937, Eglin was flying a Northrop A-17 Nomad attack bomber from Langley Field, Virginia, to Maxwell Field, Alabama when his flight path took him into heavy rain and fog. Eglin could not have known it, but he was headed straight for the 2,407-foot (734 m) peak of Cheaha Mountain, the highest in Alabama.

The A-17 crashed through a half-mile of treetops, slammed into the mountain, and burst into flames. Eglin died instantly, as did his backseater, Army 1st Lieutenant Howard E. Shelton. Eglin's remains were subsequently interred at Arlington National Cemetery with full military honors.

Because of Eglin's reputation as a top pilot and the tragic nature of his passing, the Air Corps moved swiftly to honor him, naming the Florida base that would become today's Eglin AFB as “Eglin Field” in August 1937.
