= Elgin (name) =

Elgin is both a surname and a given name. Notable people with the name include:

== Surname ==
- Catherine Elgin (born 1948), American philosopher
- Duane Elgin (born 1943), American author, speaker, educator, consultant, and media activist
- Dwayne Elgin (born 1976), Guyanese-born Sint Maartener cricketer
- Michael Elgin (born 1986), professional wrestler
- Michail Elgin (born 1981), Russian tennis player
- Mike Elgin (born 1983), offensive guard for the New England Patriots
- Neriman Elgin (1921–1994), Turkish female politician
- Sarah Elgin, American biochemist and geneticist
- Suzette Haden Elgin (1936–2015), science fiction author and linguist

== Given name ==
=== First name ===
- Elgin Baylor (1934–2021), American basketball player, coach and executive
- Elgin Cook (born 1993), American basketball player
- Elgin Davis (born 1965), American football player
- Elgin Gates (1933–1988), American hunter and firearms technician
- Elgin James, American filmmaker and musician
- Elgin Lessley (1883–1944), American cinematographer
- Elgin Rogers Jr., American politician

=== Middle name ===
- Horace Elgin Dodge (1868–1920), American businessman
