= Elgin Theatre =

The Elgin Theatre can refer to:

- Elgin Theatre (Ottawa) in Ottawa, Ontario, Canada, a former movie cinema that was the first twin cinema in North America
- Elgin and Winter Garden Theatres, in Toronto, Ontario, Canada
- Elgin Theater, a former movie cinema in New York City, USA, substantially renovated in the 1980s and now known as the Joyce Theater
