= Elgin Street =

Elgin Street is the name of the following roads:

- Elgin Street (Ottawa), Ontario, Canada
- Elgin Street, Hong Kong
- Elgin Street, former name of Haiphong Road in Tsim Sha Tsui, Kowloon, Hong Kong
- Elgin Street, Bacup, Lancashire, UK, one of the world's shortest streets

== See also ==
- Elgin Avenue, a street in Maida Vale, London
- Elgin Crescent, a street in Notting Hill, London
