= Lady Elgin =

Lady Elgin may refer to:

- Lady Elgin, the wife of the Earl of Elgin
  - Mary Louisa Bruce, Countess of Elgin, the second wife of James Bruce, 8th Earl of Elgin
- PS Lady Elgin, a steamship named in honour of Mary Louisa Lambton
