= Egan v Willis =

Judgement of the High Court of Australia

- Court: High Court of Australia
- Full case name: Egan v Willis
- Decided: 19 November 1998
- Citation: [1998] HCA 71

Court membership
- Judges sitting: Gaudron, McHugh, Gummow, Kirby, Hayne, Callinan JJ

Case opinions
- The New South Wales Legislative Council has the implied power to require one of its members, who is a Minister, to produce State papers to the House, together with the power to counter obstruction where it occurs. (per Gaudron, McHugh, Gummow, Kirby, Hayne) dissenting Callinan J

Egan v Willis is a decision of the High Court of Australia.

The Court found that legislative chambers in Australia have an implied power to compel their members to produce papers to the house, together with an implied power to counter obstruction where it occurs. In particular, the New South Wales Legislative Council had the power to compel Michael Egan to produce certain documents to the chamber, and when he refused to do so; the forced removal of him from the chamber by the Usher of the Black Rod did not constitute a trespass.

== Facts ==
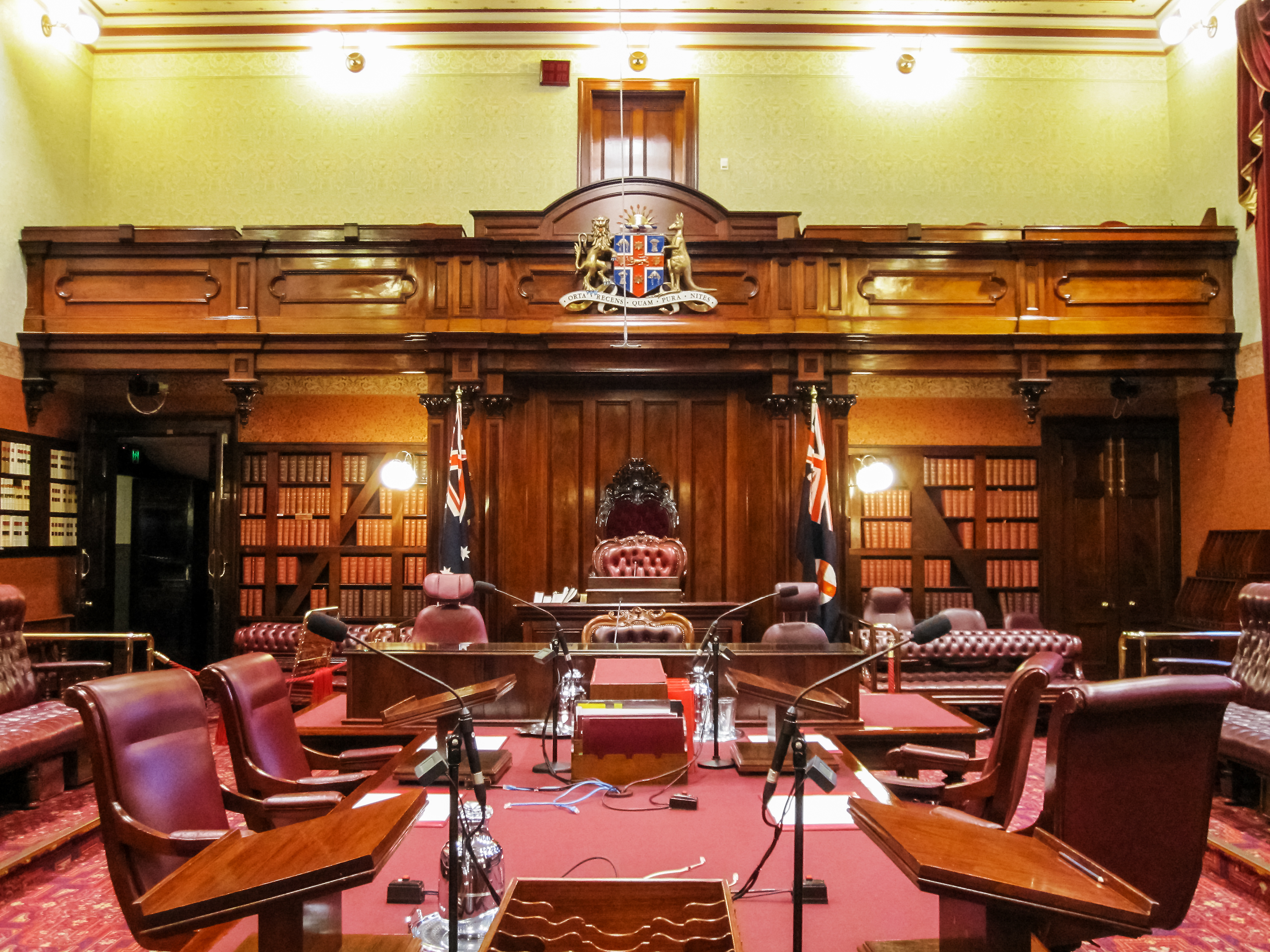
Pictured: The legislative council chamber of the Parliament of New South Wales

In 1995 the NSW Legislative Council passed a resolution that there be tabled in the house, documents relating to various activities of the Government. In 1996 a further resolution was passed stating that it would be a sufficient compliance 'for the Minister to table the documents required by delivering them to the Clerk of the House'. Six days later the NSW Cabinet decided that they would decline to comply with the resolution.

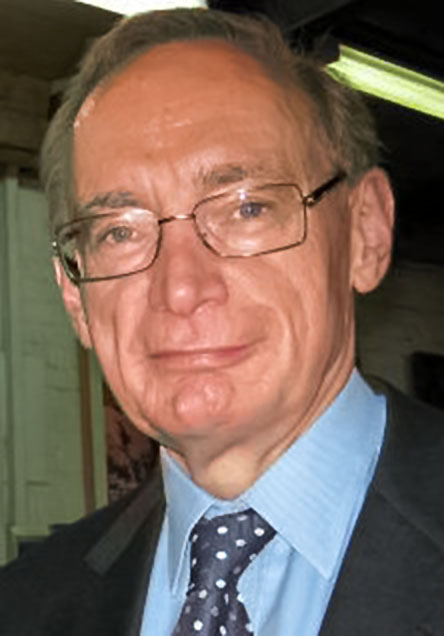
Bob Carr, former Premier of New South Wales. His cabinet had instructed its member, Michael Egan to not cooperate with the motion passed by the Legislative Council

Michael Egan, a Member of the Legislative Council, had in his possession at least four documents capable of falling within the 1996 resolution. He asserted that the Legislative Council was unable to compel compliance with their resolution. He was ejected from the chamber for refusing compliance, and in response sued in trespass. The central question of the appeal was whether there was any justification for the trespass constituted by his removal from the chamber; a question which presented an issue as to the powers of the Legislative Council with respect to its 1996 resolutions.

== Decision ==
The Court found that 'If a member will not produce documents sought by the House there may be some limits to the steps it may take in response', and that '... one of the steps that the House may undoubtedly take is to resolve that the member be suspended for a limited time from the service of the House, and that is what happened here.'

== Significance ==
The case is notable for having established that the powers and proceedings of Australia's legislative chambers are justiciable issues for the courts. Politically the case is notable as a significant embarrassment at the time for the Carr Government. Law professor Gerard Carney described the 'constitutional significance' of the case as 'profound', as it serves to 'judicially confirm the fundamental role of each House of Parliament to scrutinize the activities of the Executive Branch'.
