= Elgin High School =

Elgin High School may refer to one of several high schools:

In Canada:

- Central Elgin Collegiate Institute — St. Thomas, Ontario
- Elgin Park Secondary School — Surrey, British Columbia

In Scotland:

- Elgin High School (Scotland) — Elgin, Moray
- Elgin Academy, Scotland — Elgin, Moray

In the United States:

- Elgin High School (Illinois) — Elgin, Illinois
- Elgin High School (Minnesota) — Elgin, Minnesota
- Elgin High School (Nebraska) — Elgin, Nebraska
- Elgin High School (Ohio) — Marion, Ohio
- Elgin High School (Oklahoma) — Elgin, Oklahoma
- Elgin High School (Oregon) — Elgin, Oregon
- Elgin High School (North Dakota) — Elgin, North Dakota
- Elgin High School (Texas) — Elgin, Texas
- Lugoff-Elgin High School in Lugoff, South Carolina
- South Elgin High School — South Elgin, Illinois
