= Charles Eagan =

Canadian scientist

- Born: Charles Joseph Eagan; 1921; Tottenham, Ontario, Canada
- Died: March 11, 2010 (aged 88–89); Ottawa, Ontario, Canada
- Scientific career
- Fields: Cold weather physiology

Charles Eagan (1921 – March 11, 2010) was a Canadian scientist working in cold weather physiology, known primarily for advancing the wind chill formula.

Antarctic explorers Paul Siple and Charles Passel had created their original formula for wind chill measurements in 1939 by drawing on data that showed how long it took water to freeze in a cylinder under various wind and temperature conditions. While conducting research for the U.S. Air Force in Fairbanks, Alaska in 1964, Eagan recognized it would be more accurate if the equation took into account the fact people normally walk outdoors and don't spend a great deal of time at a standstill or in a windless environment. When Eagan included walking speed (1.8 metres per second) into the formula, wind chill temperatures warmed.

Eagan served with the air force as a radio operator in Gander, Newfoundland and Labrador during the Second World War. Upon his return he attended the University of Western Ontario and earned a master's in biophysics. After graduating, he went on to develop clothing that allowed soldiers to work through the cold. In 1959 in Fort Wainwright, Alaska, he worked with the U.S. Air Force Arctic Aeromedical Laboratory to help pilots and crews maximize their effectiveness in cold conditions. Eagan worked with mountain climbers at 14,300 feet on the flank of Mount McKinley to test their adaptability to altitude and cold.

Eagan spent six years as an associate professor at Colorado State University. He settled in Ottawa in 1973, where he was employed as head of the physiology section of what was then the Department of National Health and Welfare. Here he examined the impact of coal mining on the respiratory health of people in Sydney, Nova Scotia. He finished his career with the Department of National Defence, returning to his work on protecting soldiers from the cold.

Eagan died on March 11, 2010, at the Pearley Rideau Veterans' Health Centre in Ottawa.
