= The Elgin, Darjeeling =

Heritage hotel in Darjeeling, India

The Elgin Hotel, Darjeeling

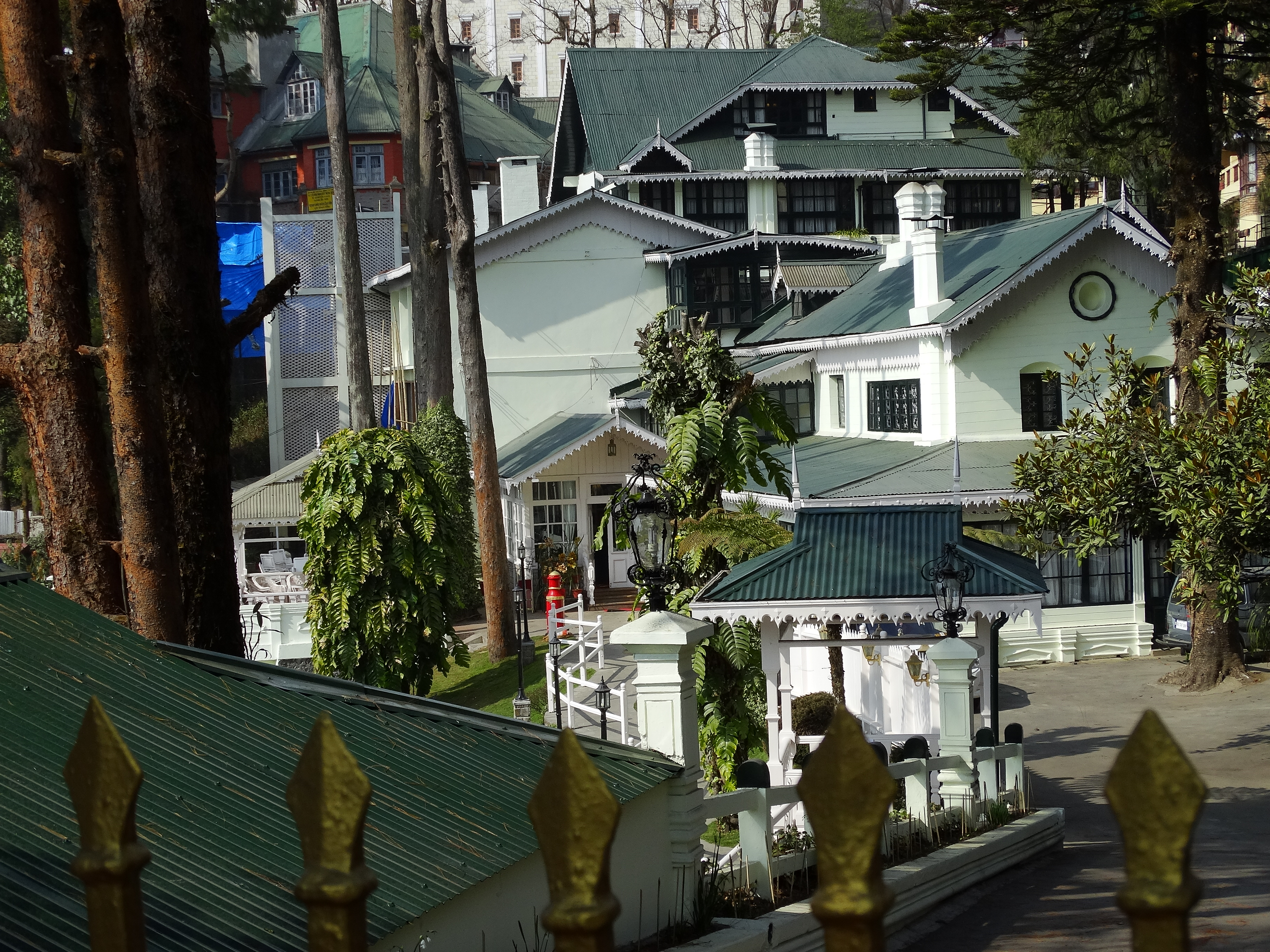
- View of The Elgin Hotel, Darjeeling.

General information
- Location: India, Darjeeling; H. D. Lama Road, 734 101
- Owner: Elgin Hotels and Resorts

Other information
- Number of rooms: 25 double rooms
- Number of suites: 3
- Number of restaurants: 3

Website
- elginhotels.com

The Elgin Hotel, formerly known as The New Elgin, is a luxury five-star heritage hotel located in Darjeeling, West Bengal, India. It is owned by Elgin Hotels and Resorts.

== History ==
Built in 1887 around a garden, the property was initially the summer residence of the Maharaja of Cooch Behar and was later leased to British families such as the Pavion and the Oakley family.

In 1965, Kuldip Chand Oberoi of the Oberoi family of hoteliers bought the hotel with his entire life savings of INR 40,000 where his lessee, Nancy Oakley, was running it as a guest house. When Oakley departed for England in 1968, a sole proprietorship firm named "New Elgin Hotel" was established and registered, with Oberoi as its sole proprietor.

In 1975, the sole proprietorship firm transitioned into a partnership firm, adopting the name "New Elgin Hotel" with three directors: Mr. Kuldip Chand Oberoi, his wife Mrs. Shanti Devi Oberoi, and his son Mr. Diamond Oberoi.

Subsequently, in 1995, the partnership firm "New Elgin Hotel" evolved into a private limited company, leading to the establishment of "Elgin Hotels Private Limited" with three directors: Mr. Diamond Oberoi, Mrs. Nimmi Oberoi, and Mr. Viraj Oberoi, a structure that remains unchanged to this day.

== Preservation efforts ==
The hotel, designed in the style of a royal manor house, has undergone extensive refurbishment to reclaim its former grandeur while preserving its rich history.

This includes the incorporation of etchings by Goray Douglas, lithographs by William Daniell, period Burma teak furniture, oak floorboards, paneling, and original fireplaces.

== Notable guests ==
This hotel has played host to dignitaries like the US Ambassador, the Crown Prince of Sikkim Palden Thondup Namgyal, French author Dominique Lapierre, British journalist and writer Mark Tully, ghazal singer Pankaj Udhas, and former Minister of External Affairs Jaswant Singh, and model-actor Milind Soman.
