= Elgin Museum =

Elgin Museum could refer to:

- The Elgin Public Museum in Elgin, Illinois, USA
- The Elgin Museum (Moray) in Elgin, Moray, Scotland
- The Elgin Museum (Oregon) in Elgin, Oregon, USA
- The Elgin Military Museum in St. Thomas, Ontario, Canada
- The Elgin Museum (North Dakota) in Elgin, North Dakota
