= Walter de Lacy, Lord of Meath =

Lord of Meath in Ireland

Walter de Lacy
- Lord of Meath
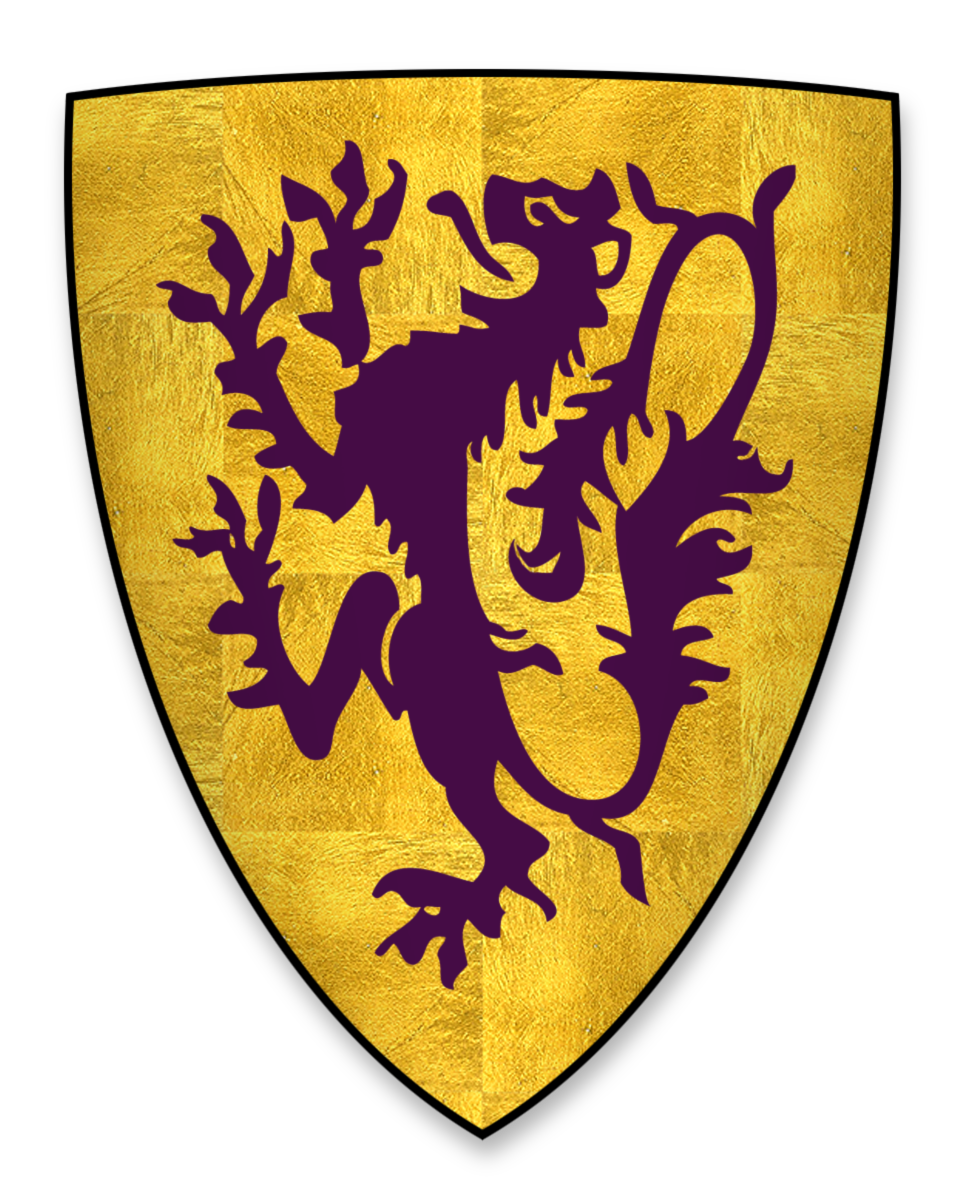
- Born: 1172
- Died: 1241 (aged 68–69)
- Spouse: Margaret de Braose
- Issue: Pernel; Egidia; Gilbert
- Father: Hugh de Lacy
- Mother: Rohese of Monmouth

Walter de Lacy (c. 1172 – 1241) was lord of Meath in Ireland. He was also a substantial landowner in Weobley, Herefordshire, in Ludlow, Shropshire, in Ewyas Lacy in the Welsh Marches, and several lands in Normandy. He was the eldest son of Hugh de Lacy, a leading Cambro-Norman baron in the Norman invasion of Ireland, and Rohese of Monmouth.

== Life ==
With his father he built Trim Castle (Irish: 'Caisletheán Bhaile Atha Troim) in Trim, County Meath.

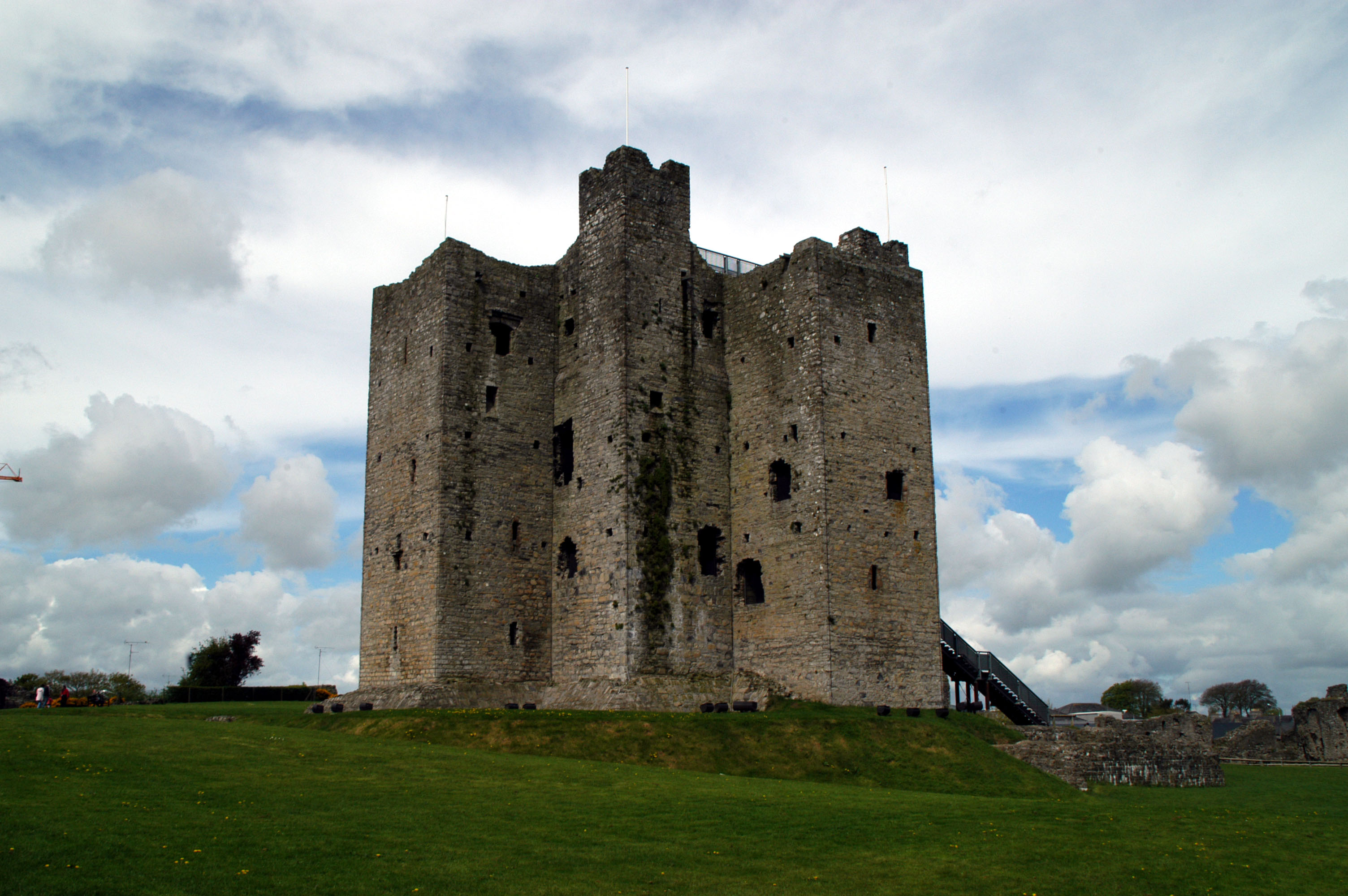
The keep of Trim Castle

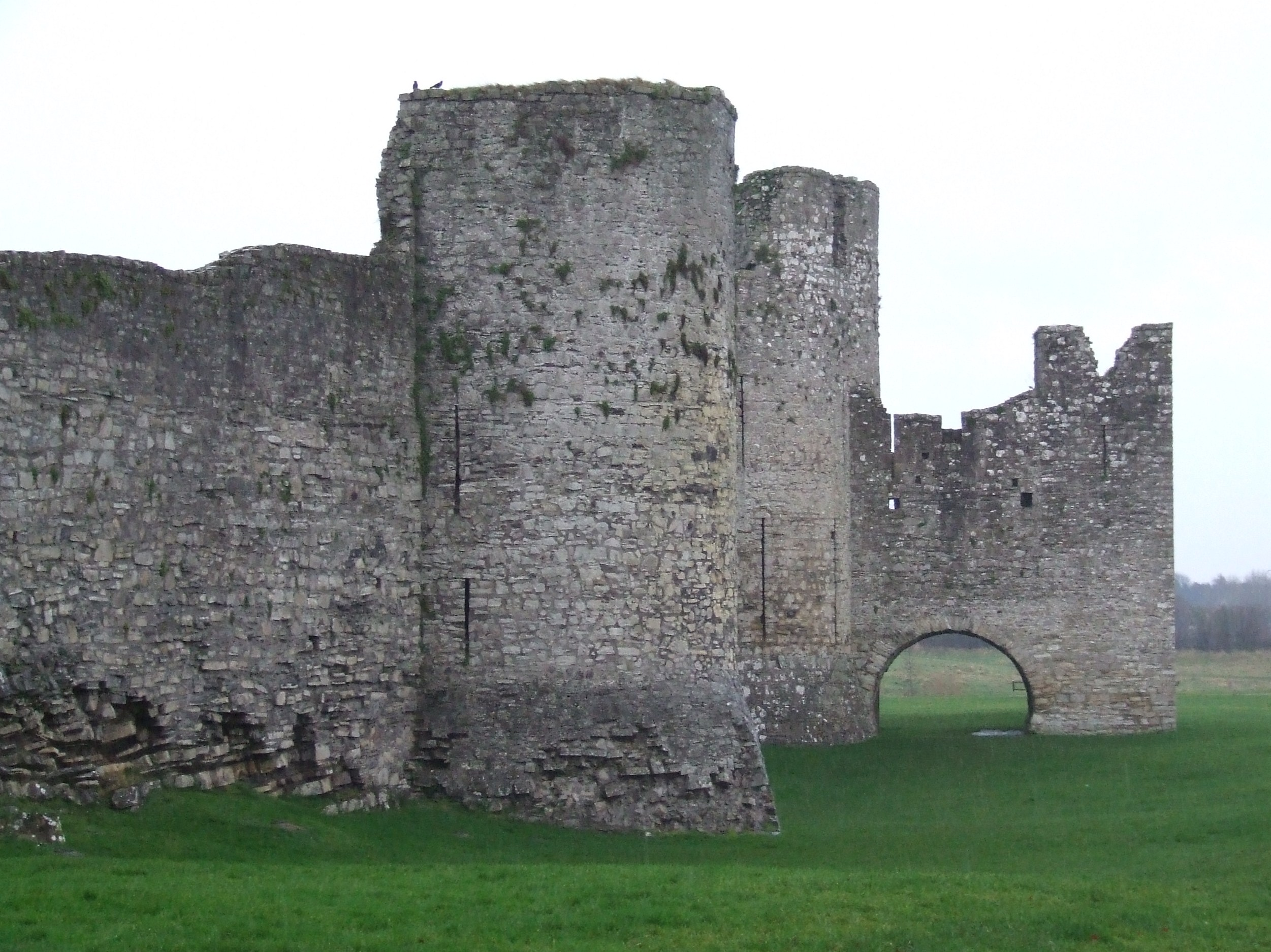
Trim Castle's barbican

During the revolt of Prince John "lackland", Lord of Ireland, against his brother, King Richard "the lionheart", in 1193–94, Walter de Lacy joined with John de Courcy to support Richard. De Lacy apprehended some knights loyal to John along with Peter Pipard, John's justiciar in Ireland.

De Lacy did homage to Richard for his lands in Ireland in 1194, receiving his lordship of Meath. After mounting the throne of England in 1199, Prince John wrote to his justiciar in Ireland to complain that de Courcy and de Lacy had destroyed his land of Ireland. Walter had made John his enemy.

In 1203, John granted custody of the city of Limerick to de Lacy's father-in-law, William de Braose, 4th Lord of Bramber. As de Braose was an absentee, de Lacy served as de Braose's deputy in Limerick.

In 1206–07, de Lacy became involved in a conflict with Meiler Fitzhenry, Justiciar of Ireland, and de Lacy's feudal tenants for lands in Meath; Fitzhenry had seized Limerick. King John summoned de Lacy to appear before him in England in April 1207. After de Lacy's brother Hugh de Lacy, 1st Earl of Ulster, had taken Fitzhenry prisoner, John in March 1208 acquiesced in giving Walter de Lacy a new charter for his lands in Meath. Upon his return to Ireland later in 1208, de Lacy may have acted as Justiciar of Ireland in lieu of the deposed Meiler Fitzhenry. By this time, John had begun his infamous persecution of de Lacy's father-in-law, de Braose, who fled to Ireland.

On 20 June 1210, King John landed in Crook, now in County Waterford, with his feudal levy and a force of Flemish mercenaries; John marched north through Leinster. When John reached Dublin on 27 or 28 June, de Lacy attempted to throw himself on John's mercy, sending five of his tenants to Dublin to place his lands in Meath back in the king's hand, and disclaiming any attempt to shelter his brother Hugh from John's wrath. John attacked eastern Meath, and was joined by 400 of de Lacy's deserting followers. John would hold de Lacy's lands in Meath for five years.

In 1211 de Lacy erected the castle on Turbet Island in the abortive Anglo-Norman attempt to gain control of West Ulster.

Attempting to secure support in Ireland against the brewing revolt that would lead to Magna Carta, John began negotiations to restore de Lacy to his lands in Meath in the summer of 1215.

De Lacy was Sheriff of Herefordshire from 1218 to 1222. In 1230 he joined with Geoffrey de Marisco and Richard Mór de Burgh to subdue Aedh mac Ruaidri Ó Conchobair, King of Connacht.

He was a benefactor to the abbeys of Llanthony and Craswall (Herefordshire) and also founded the abbey of Beaubec in Ireland.

On his death, his estate was divided between his granddaughters Margery and Maud.

== Ancestry ==
Ancestors of Walter de Lacy, Lord of Meath

Walter de Lacy
Roger de Lacy
Emma or Emmelina
Gilbert de Lacy
Hugh de Lacy, Lord of Meath
Agnes
Walter de Lacy, Lord of Meath
Baderon
William fitzBaderon
Baderon of Monmouth
Hawise of Monmouth
Rohese (Rose) de Monmouth
Richard fitz Gilbert
Sir Gilbert Fitz Richard, Lord of Clare
Rohese Giffard
Rohese de Clare
Hugh I, Count of Clermont-en-Beauvaisis
Adeliza/Alice de Clermont
Margaret de Roucy

== Family, marriage and issue ==
He married Margaret de Braose, the daughter of William de Braose, 4th Lord of Bramber and Maud de St. Valery and had issue.

- Pernel de Lacy (c. 1201 – after 25 November 1288), married Sir Ralph VI de Toeni, Lord of Flamstead, son of Sir Roger IV de Toeni, Lord of Flamstead and Constance de Beaumont.
- Egidia de Lacy (also called Gille) who married Richard Mór de Burgh, Lord of Connaught and Strathearn. Together they had many notable descendants, including David II of Scotland, the Earls of Clanricarde, Jane Seymour, Margaret de Clare, the Earls of Ormond, English kings Edward IV and Richard III, and many other British monarchs.
- Gilbert de Lacy of Ewyas Harold, Herefordshire was taken hostage for his father in August 1215. He predeceased his father before 25 December 1230. Gilbert married Isabel Bigod, daughter of Sir Hugh Bigod, 3rd Earl of Norfolk (Magna Carta surety) and Maud Marshal. They had a son and two daughters:

- Walter de Lacy, who married Rohese le Botiller but had no issue. De Lacy died between 1238 and 1241.
- Margery (Margaret) de Lacy, who married Sir John de Verdun, Lord of Westmeath, the son of Theobald le Botiller, 2nd Chief Butler of Ireland and Roesia de Verdun.
- Maud de Lacy, who married Lord Geoffrey de Geneville, Justiciar of Ireland, the son of Simon of Joinville, Seneschal of Champagne, and Beatrix of Burgundy. Together Geoffrey and Maud had at least three children: (Note: Geoffrey de Geneville and Maud de Lacy possibly had two additional sons, Gautier and Jean.)

- Geoffrey de Geneville (died 1283)
- Sir Piers de Geneville, of Trim and Ludlow (born 1256, died shortly before June 1292), who in his turn married in 1283 Jeanne of Lusignan by whom he had three daughters, including Joan de Geneville, 2nd Baroness Geneville
- Joan de Geneville, married Gerald FitzMaurice FitzGerald (died 1287)

== Sources ==
- A general and heraldic dictionary of the peerages of England, Ireland, and Scotland by John Burke
- Ancestral Roots of Certain American Colonists Who Came to America Before 1700 by Frederick Lewis Weis, Lines: 70-29, 75A-30, 98–28, 177A-7

Political offices
Preceded by Hugh de Lacy, Lord of Meath	Lord High Constable of Ireland; 1186–1241	Succeeded by Sir John de Verdun, Lord of Westmeath
