= Gilbert fitzBaderon =

- Died: about 1189
- Parents: Baderon of Monmouth; Rohese de Clare
- Relatives: Rohese of Monmouth (sister)

Gilbert fitzBaderon of Monmouth (died about 1189) was one of the two sons of Baderon fitzWilliam by his wife Rohese de Clare. When Baderon died, at some date between 1170 and 1176, Gilbert succeeded him as lord of Monmouth and holder of Monmouth Castle. Gilbert is best known as a patron of literature and it was under Gilbert's patronage that the poet Hugh of Rhuddlan wrote his verse romance Ipomedon, which was among the most popular works in its genre in medieval England. The original text in Anglo-Norman (a variant of Old French spoken and written in Norman England and Wales) was translated at least three times into Middle English under the variant title Ipomadon. Hugh afterwards wrote a sequel, Protheselaus, which he dedicated to his patron Gilbert fitzBaderon.

Around 1170 Gilbert acted as witness when his sister Rohese of Monmouth and his brother-in-law Hugh de Lacy, Lord of Meath, made a donation to Monmouth Priory. On his death Gilbert was succeeded as lord of Monmouth by John of Monmouth.

== Sources ==
- Meale, Carol M., ed. (1996). Women and Literature in Britain, 1150-1500. Cambridge University Press.
