= Rohese of Monmouth =

Anglo-Norman noblewoman

- Born: about 1135/1140
- Died: in or near 1180
- Other names: Rohese de Monemue
- Known for: Patronage of Monmouth Priory
- Spouse: Hugh de Lacy, Lord of Meath
- Children: Walter de Lacy, Lord of Meath; Hugh de Lacy, 1st Earl of Ulster; Six others
- Parents: Baderon of Monmouth; Rohese de Clare
- Relatives: Gilbert fitzBaderon (brother)

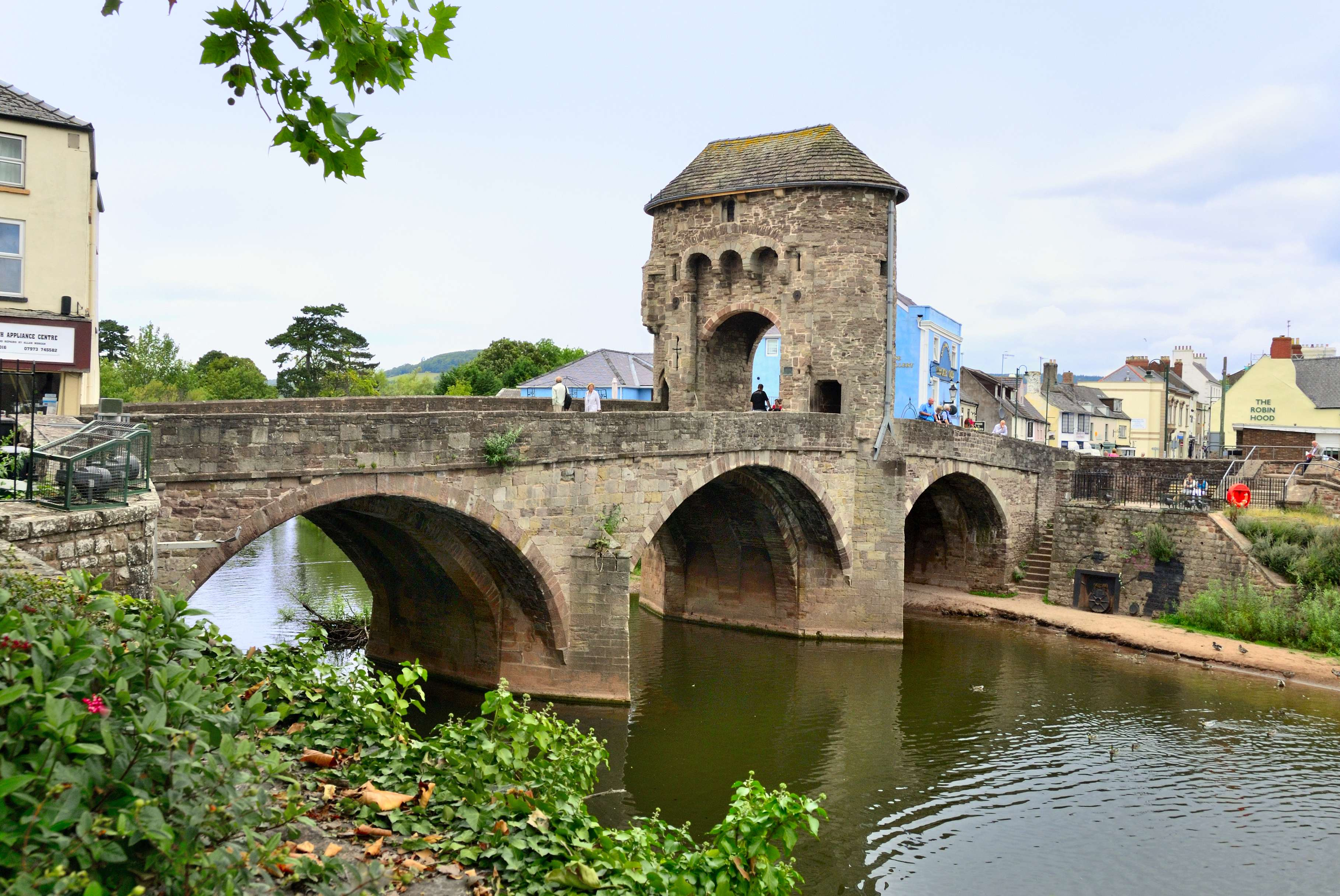
Monnow Bridge is a medieval bridge over the namesake river Monnow in the town of Monmouth, Wales. The existing bridge was completed in the late 13th century. It is the only remaining medieval fortified bridge in Britain.

Rohese of Monmouth (Rohese de Monemue in Anglo-Norman; born about 1135/1140; died in or near 1180) was a member of the wealthy and powerful Anglo-Norman families in the Welsh Marches.

== Early life ==
She was the daughter of Baderon fitzWilliam, lord of Monmouth, and of his wife Rohese de Clare. Rohese's paternal grandfather was William fitzBaderon (c. 1060/65? – before 1138) an Anglo-Norman nobleman of Breton descent, lord of Monmouth c. 1082-1125, mentioned in the 1086 Domesday Book as in charge of Monmouth Castle and parts of the surrounding region. In 1101, Fitzbaderon ensured the consecration of the Monmouth Priory, established in 1075 by his uncle Withenoc, Lord of Monmouth who became a monk. Her paternal great grandmother Rohese Giffard was one of the few women mentioned in the 1086 Domesday Book as holding land in her own right.

Rohese's maternal grandparents were Gilbert Fitz Richard de Clare (c. 1066–c. 1117) and Adeliza de Clermont. Her grandfather had been an influential Anglo-Norman baron who was granted the Lordship of Cardigan, in Wales c. 1107–1111.

== Marriage ==
About the year 1155 Rohese married Hugh de Lacy, Lord of Meath. They had eight recorded children.

- Walter de Lacy, born about 1172, who succeeded his father as Lord of Meath
- Hugh de Lacy, born about 1176, who was created 1st Earl of Ulster
- Gilbert de Lacy
- Robert de Lacy, who died young
- William de lacy, who was captured in Ireland in 1210 by King John and died in captivity
- Elaine de Lacy, who married Richard de Beaufo
- Alicia de Lacy, who married Roger Pipard and afterwards Geoffrey de Marisco (sometimes called Geoffrey de Mareys), Justiciar of Ireland, son of Jordan de Marisco, Justiciar of Ireland.
- an unnamed daughter, who married William FitzAlan, 1st Lord of Oswestry and Clun, son of Sir William FitzAlan, Lord of Oswestry, and his first wife Christiana.

== Legacy ==
Rohese is notable for the gift that she made, jointly with her husband and her son Robert, to Monmouth Priory. The Priory had benefited for more than half a century from her family's generosity, and it was clearly at her persuasion that this donation took place. Three shillings were to be given to the priory each year on St Michael's Day from the revenues of the town of Lydney in Gloucestershire. Rohese's brother Gilbert, otherwise known as a patron of literature, was among the witnesses to this donation.

Rohese died around 1180 and Hugh married for a second time to Princess Rose Ní Conchobair, daughter of King of Ireland, Ruaidrí Ua Conchobair. There were two further children, William 'Gorm' de Lacy and Ysota de Lacy from this marriage. William fought alongside Rohese's sons Walter and Hugh junior in their struggles to gain power in Ireland.
