= John of Monmouth (disambiguation) =

John of Monmouth (c.1182–1248) was an Anglo-Norman feudal lord.

John of Monmouth or John de Monmouth may also refer to:

- John of Monmouth (died 1257), Anglo-Norman feudal lord, son of John of Monmouth (c.1182–1248)
- John of Monmouth (bishop) (died 1323), bishop of Llandaff
- John de Monmouth (MP) for Gloucester (UK Parliament constituency)
