= Lordship of Meath =

The Lordship of Meath was an extensive seigneurial liberty in medieval Ireland that was awarded to Hugh de Lacy by King Henry II of England by the service of fifty knights and with almost royal authority. The Lordship was roughly co-extensive with the medieval kingdom of Meath. At its greatest extent, it included all of the modern counties of Fingal, Meath (which takes its name from the kingdom), Westmeath as well as parts of counties Cavan, Kildare, Longford, Louth and Offaly. The Lordship or fiefdom was imbued with privileges enjoyed in no other Irish liberty, including the four royal pleas of arson, forestalling, rape, and treasure trove.

== Background ==
Following the Norman invasion of Ireland, King Henry II visited Ireland in 1171 to establish his authority over both Norman adventurers and the native Irish. He failed, however, to bring the country under a single, centralised control. Henry only claimed the title "Lord of Ireland", which he passed to his son, John "Lackland". John and his successors remained as Lords of Ireland until the 16th century. Instead of a central government, the royal policy was to promote individual lordships. As a secondary objective, Henry aimed to break the power of Richard de Clare, 2nd Earl of Pembroke (commonly called "Strongbow") and to divide the Geraldines. He recognised that he was unable to curb their ambitions but wished to avoid any one baron having such a base of power as might one day threaten his own realm. He therefore awarded offices and the lands of the newly created lordships to new men – his own loyalists. Consistent with this plan, he kept the major ports of Waterford, Cork and Dublin in his own hands, as well as a strip of the Wicklow coast. He replaced Maurice FitzGerald as "Keeper of Dublin" with Hervey de Clare, Lord of Montmorency who was FitzGerald's brother-in-law and Strongbow's uncle. Montmorency also took over command of Strongbow's forces from Raymond le gros who was recalled to Wales by the King. He also took another prime mover in the invasion – Miles de Cogan – to Wales. In March 1172, the King granted the Lordship of Meath to Hugh de Lacy by service of fifty knights. On John de Courcy he bestowed Ulster "if he could conquer it." These lords were reliant on their own aggression for laying claim to their lands and for securing them. Castles, by virtue of their defensive and offensive capabilities as well as their symbolic status, were indispensable for dominating the area of the lordship.

== Grant to de Lacy ==
The grant of Meath was not accepted by Tighearnán Ó Ruairc, King of Bréifne, who ruled it at that time. Following a confrontation at the Hill of Ward in early 1172, Ó Ruairc was slain and de Lacy assumed control.

King Henry preferred Hugh de Lacy over Strongbow in the positions of Justiciar and of Constable of Dublin Castle. The grant was on the basis of grand serjeanty for his services as bailiff to the King. De Lacy chose the barons Robert Fitz-Stephen, Maurice FitzGerald, Meiler Fitzhenry and Miles FitzDavid to garrison the city. This kept them apart from Strongbow. On 17 April 1172, Henry sailed from Ireland never to return. Hugh also returned to England in late 1172 and spend much of the following year fighting for Henry in France. He was sent over to Ireland as procurator-general in 1177, Richard de Clare having died shortly before. The grant of Meath was now confirmed, with the addition of Offelana, Offaly, Kildare, and Wicklow. This left Hugh in possession of most of the over-kingdom of Leinster, in addition to the Kingdom of Meath, with exception of the city of Dublin and the southern principalities of Ossory and Hy-Kinsellagh (Irish: Uí Ceinnselaig) (centred on the modern county of Wexford).

In 1181, he was recalled from his government for having married Rose Ní Conchobair, the daughter of Ruaidrí Ua Conchobair, King of Connaught without leave of Henry. The following year he was restored to his offices.

After Hugh's death in 1186, the lordship passed, after a period of wardship, to his son, Walter. A charter from 1191, shows Walter exercising lordship in Meath. As Lord of Ireland, John deprived de Lacy of Meath in 1192. This action was overturned by King Richard the Lionheart upon the latter's return from the Third Crusade in 1194.

By letters patent from John, King of England, the prescriptive barony was granted to Walter de Lacy and his heirs in perpetuity in 1208. The grant describes the scope of administrative responsibility, and the limits of powers delegated:

"Grant and confirmation to Walter de Lascy, on his petition, of his land of Meath; to hold of the King in fee by the service of 50 knights; and of his fees of Fingal, in the vale of Dublin; to hold in fee by the service of 7 knights; saving to the King pleas of the Crown, appeals of the peace, & c., and crociae, and the dignities thereto belonging; the King’s writs to run throughout Walter’s land. Further grant to Walter of the custody of his fees, although the lords thereof hold elsewhere in capite; saving to the King the marriages of the heirs of those fees."

Walter de Lacy married Margaret de Braose who was the daughter of William de Braose, 4th Lord of Bramber and Maud de Braose. William, Maud and their son William were declared traitors to the Crown by King John. Maud and her son fled to Ireland to the protection of her daughter Margaret. In 1210, they were again obliged to flee but were apprehended on the Antrim coast. Imprisoned in the dungeon of Corfe Castle, Dorset, they were left to starve to death. As punishment for having harboured traitors within his castle, Walter de Lacy's estates were forfeited to the Crown. By 1215, Walter and Margaret were back in the King's favour and Walter's confiscated estates were restored to him. Together Walter and Margaret had at least six children including Gilbert de Lacy. As Gilbert predeceased his father on 25 December 1230, Walter's vast estates in Ireland and England passed to Gilbert's daughters, Margery and Maud.

=== Settlements c. 1200 ===
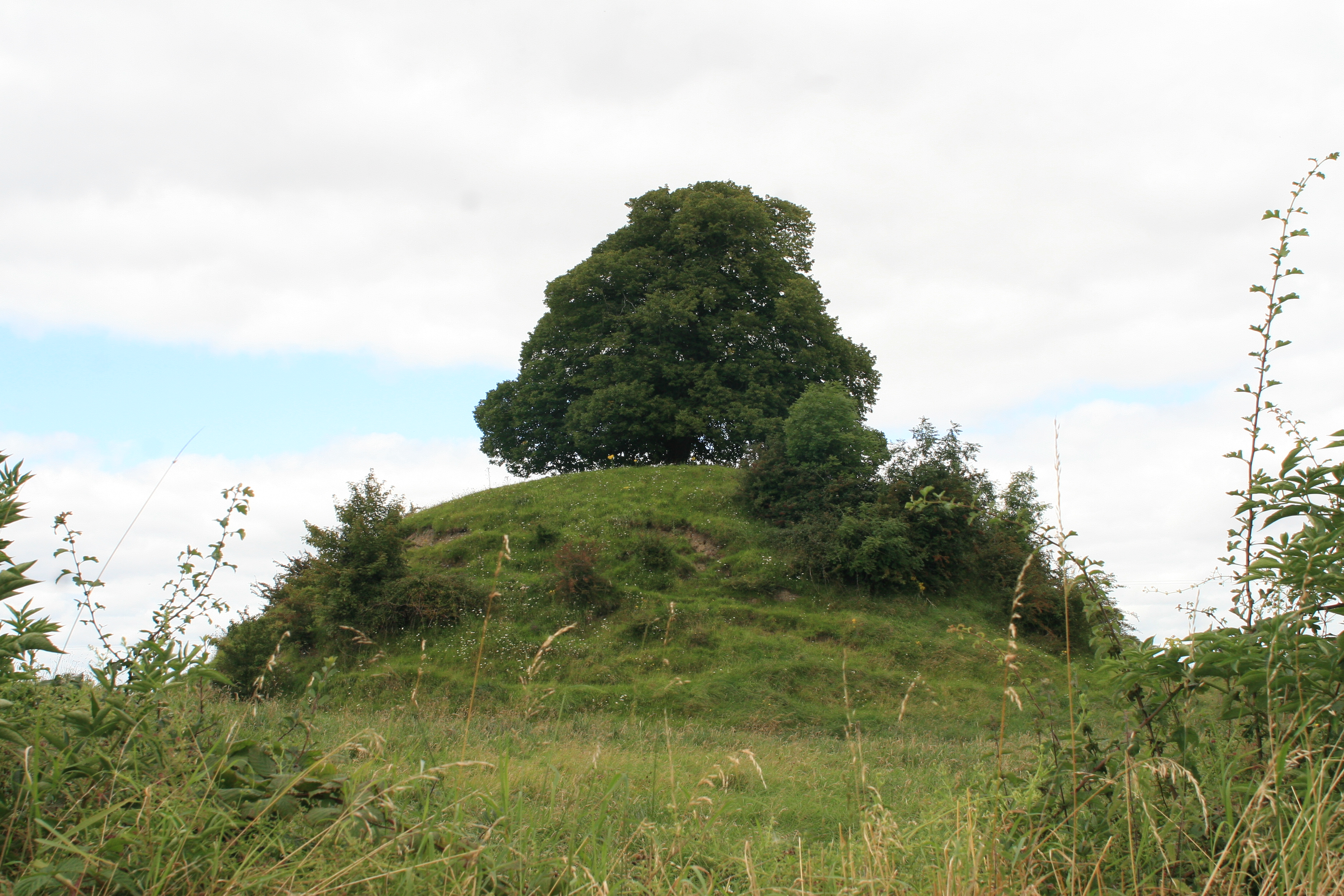
Motte-and-bailey built by Hugh de Lacy at Clonard, Co Meath

Henry II granted Hugh de Lacy "the land of Meath in as full a measure as Murchadh...or anyone before or after him held it.". By this grant, de Lacy's power was equal to that of the king himself, the only reservation being that the king could dispose of Church lands anywhere. A person with this jurisdiction was known as a Count and the territory over which he ruled was called a county. As the ruler of a county palatine he created his own feudal baronies, held directly from himself in capite. His vassals were commonly called "De Lacy's Barons".

Known as a great builder of castles, by c. 1200, de Lacy had settlements all over the lordship, either in his own hands or the hands of his barons. With his son Walter (1180–1240) he built Trim Castle and Kilkea Castle. Some time after 1196, Walter, granted "the whole land of Rathtowth" to his younger brother, Hugh. This sub-division, named the Barony of Ratoath, was perhaps the first instance of the use of the term barony in Ireland for a division of a county.

According to The Song of Dermot and the Earl (a 12th-century Norman French poem), the land may have been divided among the following barons :

- In Fingal: Hugh Tyrrel, who obtained the barony of Castleknock and whose stronghold was Castleknock Castle
- In County Louth: the castle and borough of Drogheda (in his own hands)
- In County Meath.

- Gilbert de Angulo (or Gilbert de Nangle), who became Baron of Navan and obtained the barony of Morgallion. His son Jocelin also obtained Navan. Their stronghold was the castle of Nobber.
- Adam de Feypo (or Adam de Phepoe), who obtained Skreen by charter.
- Hugh de Hose (or Sir Hugh Hussey Kt.), who became Baron of Galtrim with castles at Galtrim and Derrypatrick (which lie between Trim and Dunshaughlin).
- Adam Dullard (or Adam Dollard) whose stronghold was at Dollardstown (which lies between Slane and Navan).
- Gilbert de Nugent, Baron of Delvin and later Earl of Westmeath whose stronghold was at Nugentstown, south of Kells.
- William le Petit; who obtained Castlebrack, Magherdernon and Rathkenny;
- Other castles are located at Kells, Slane, Duleek, Athboy and Clonard.
- The county also contained boroughs at Kells, Skreen, Trim, Ratoath and Greenogue (on the Broadmeadow water).

- In County Westmeath.

- Risteárd de Tiúit, who received the Barony of Moyashel centred on Dysart, Mullingar and Rathconel (from west to east)
- Robert de Lacy, who obtained Rathwire.
- Geoffrey de Constantine, who obtained 'good and fine land' near Rathconrath and Kilbixy (near Lough Iron).
- Meiler Fitz Henry, who obtained Ardnorcher or Horseleap (on the border of County Offaly).
- Other castles are located at Fore (near Lough Lene), Delvin, Ballymore (near the Hill of Uisneach), Killare.

- In County Offaly: the castle at Durrow
- In County Longford: Risteárd de Tiúit also built Granard Motte. It was one of the largest Motte-and-bailey castles in Ireland. In 1556–7, the hereditaments, castles, churches, messuages, lordships, chapels, fisheries of Granard in the Annaly which later became the County Longford are granted to Baron Delvin who is Sir Richard Nugent in capite by knight's service.
- Other barons mentioned in "The Song of Dermot and the Earl", without naming their strongholds are William de Misset, Gilbert FitzThomas, Hussey, Thomas Fleming and Richard de Lachapelle.

== The Lordship split ==
Upon the death of Walter, the 2nd Lord of Meath, the lordship was split between his granddaughters; the western part was awarded to Margery while the eastern part, centred on Trim, was awarded to Maud.

=== Western Meath ===
The western part passed to Margery's husband, John de Verdun (circa 1226 – 21 Oct 1274) on their marriage sometime before 1244. He was the son of Theobald le Botiller, 2nd Chief Butler of Ireland by his second wife, Rohesia de Verdun (circa 1204 – 10 February 1247). The de Verdun family was already a substantial landholder in what is now County Louth. Rohesia's grandfather, Bertram de Verdun, was part of John's first expedition to Ireland. Upon her husband's sudden death, she returned to the de Verdun lands and commissioned the building of Castle Roche. She completed the work on the main buildings in 1236. Her son John completed work on the Great Hall several years later. They had issue Nicholas (circa 1244), John (circa 1246), Theobald (circa 1248), William (circa 1250), Thomas (circa 1252) and Agnes (circa 1254).

Theobald was created 1st Lord de Verdun and also held the hereditary title "Constable of Ireland. He married Margery de Bohun, daughter of Sir Humphrey de Bohun and Eleanor de Braose, before 6 November 1276. He died on 24 August 1309 at Alton, Staffordshire. They had a son, also called Theobald (b. 8 Sep 1278, d. 27 Jul 1316). The 2nd Lord de Verdun had no male heirs. In 1317, the de Lacy heirs, based in Rathwire were defeated and exiled by Roger Mortimer, who was their relation by marriage. This resulted in the re-unification in the Lordship.

=== Eastern Meath ===
When Maud married for the second time, the lordships of Trim and Ludlow passed to her husband, Geoffrey de Geneville, 1st Baron Geneville by right of his marriage to her. King Henry III of England granted Geoffrey and Maud, and their heirs rights in the land of Meath held by her grandfather, by charter dated 8 August 1252. On 18 September 1254, the king granted them all the liberties and free customs in Meath which her grandfather had held; and they might issue their own writs in Meath according to the law and custom of Ireland. On 21 September 1252, they had livery of Trim Castle and a moiety of forty marcates of lands as the inheritance of Maud. They made Trim Castle their chief residence. Maud and Geoffrey jointly ruled and administered their estates together in an equal partnership. They later donated property to Dore Abbey.

They had issue Geoffrey (died 1283), Piers (died 1292) and Joan (died 1287). Geoffrey, having outlived his children, left his estate to his granddaughter, Joan, the daughter of his eldest son, Piers. Joan succeeded as the suo jure 2nd Baroness Geneville on 21 October 1314. She was the wife of Roger Mortimer, 1st Earl of March. In mid-November 1308, when Mortimer received the lordship from Joan's grandfather, he had only just come of age. For six of the following twelve years (1308–09, 1310–13, 1315, 1317–18, 1319–20), Roger resided in Ireland, establishing his lordship against his wife's relatives, the de Lacys of Rathwire. In November 1316, he was appointed Lord Lieutenant of Ireland. Following his rebellion against King Edward II of England in 1321–22, all his lands in England and Ireland were forfeited. However, the King was forced to abdicate on 24 January 1327 leaving the government in the hands of Queen Isabella and Mortimer who acted as regents for the Edward who was aged 14 years at the time. Rich estates and offices of profit and power were now heaped on Mortimer. In September 1328 he was created Earl of March and launched a spree of acquisition in Ireland, gaining custody of the western half of Meath during the minority of the de Verdun heiresses, with liberty status. This reestablished the Lordship of Meath.

This state of affairs lasted until October 1330 when Edward III began to assert his independence. Mortimer and Isabella were seized by Edward and his companions from inside Nottingham Castle. Mortimer was accused of assuming royal power and of various other high misdemeanours, condemned without trial and ignominiously hanged at Tyburn on 29 November 1330. Once again, his vast estates forfeited to the crown. Mortimer's widow Joan received a pardon in 1336 and survived till 1356. She was buried beside Mortimer at Wigmore Abbey.

== List of Lords ==
- Hugh de Lacy, Lord of Meath

- Walter de Lacy, Lord of Meath. Walter's son, Gilbert de Lacy, predeceased his father. Gilbert was married to Isabel Bigod and they had two daughters who were joint heirs to their grandfather. The lordship was split between them; the western part was awarded to Margery while the eastern part, centred on Trim, was awarded to Maud de Lacy.

=== List of lords of Trim ===
- Geoffrey de Geneville, 1st Baron Geneville in right of his marriage to Maud.

- Roger Mortimer, 1st Earl of March in right of his marriage to Joan de Geneville, 2nd Baroness Geneville, granddaughter of the 1st Baron Geneville. He was accused of assuming royal power and was executed in 1330. It is probable that his Irish titles lapsed at his death. His grandson Roger Mortimer, 2nd Earl of March regained his English estates and titles. Upon the death of his grandmother, Joan de Geneville, he also regained her estates, both in England and Ireland. However, it is not known if the Lordship of Meath was also restored.

=== List of lords of West Meath ===
- John de Verdun in right of his marriage to Margery.

- Theobald, 1st Lord de Verdun

- Theobald de Verdun, 2nd Baron Verdun, son of the 1st Lord. As he had no male heirs, the lordship was re-absorbed into the original Lordship of Meath.
