= John's first expedition to Ireland =

Visit of Prince John of England to Ireland in 1185

John's First Expedition to Ireland
- Part of Norman invasion of Ireland
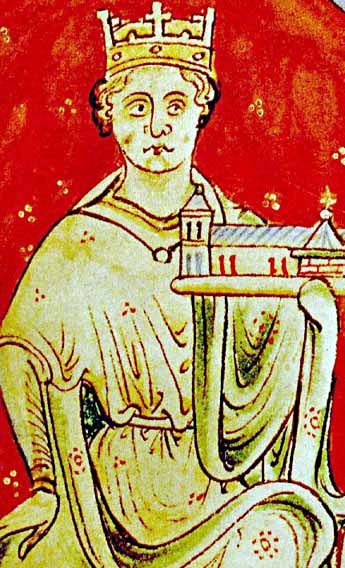
- John as King of England, painted c. 1250–1259 by Matthew Paris in his Historia Anglorum
Date	25 April 1185 – December 1185
Location	Ireland
Result	John returns to England. Hugh de Lacy falls out of royal favour.

Belligerents
Kingdom of England: Lordship of Ireland	Lordship of Meath; Gaelic Ireland

Commanders and leaders
John of England; Theobald Walter; William de Burgh	Hugh de Lacy; Domhnall Mór Ó Briain

In 1185, Prince John of England visited the island of Ireland as part of a campaign to secure the influence of the House of Plantagenet and the Crown of England, which planned to set up a Kingdom of Ireland within the Angevin Empire. John was himself a future king of England, the son of Henry II of England, and had been declared Lord of Ireland by his father at the Council of Oxford in 1177. Despite his own ambitions for the Kingdom of Jerusalem, John Lackland was sent west to Ireland by his father and landed at Waterford in April 1185.

The inexperienced young prince managed to offend the customs of the Irish Gaels who had met him diplomatically. John (who struggled to pay his own men) attempted to promise knights who traveled with him with Gaelic lands, which further irritated the natives. Aside from these concerns, he grew an intense dislike of the powerful Viceroy of Ireland, Hugh de Lacy, who held the Lordship of Meath, following his conquest of the Gaelic Kingdom of Meath. Following the Norman invasion of Ireland, the Plantagenets were repeatedly concerned with Norman barons, nominally loyal to them, becoming too powerful in Ireland and this was the case with the successful (militarily and diplomatically) de Lacys.

John returned to England in December 1185 and complained bitterly to his father about the influence of de Lacy in Ireland. Much to the relief of the Plantagenets, the following year, de Lacy himself was assassinated at Durrow by an Irishman, Giolla Gan Mathiar Ó Maidhaigh. Plans were made for John to return to Ireland and the new Pope Urban III was more favourable than his predecessors to granting him the title King of Ireland. However, this was cancelled due to the death of John's brother Geoffrey II, Duke of Brittany. John would later return to Ireland for a second time in 1210 while King of England, as part of a campaign to crush a rebellion by a section of Norman lords; this time he was far more successful.

== Preparation ==
The subject of John going to Ireland first came into question under the reign of his father, Henry II, specifically with the Council of Oxford in 1177. This council dismissed William FitzAldelm as Deputy of Ireland and agreed to have John made King of Ireland. This would appear to have been a strategy of Henry II's to divide his Angevin possessions between his four sons. The approval of Pope Alexander III was sought to have John crowned King of Ireland. Disagreements with first Alexander III and then his successor Pope Lucius III caused this to be delayed and instead John went as only Lord of Ireland.

In 1184 arrangements were made for John's departure with the sending of John Cumin and Philip of Worcester to prepare the ground for John's arrival. John arrived in Ireland in April 1185, landing at Waterford with around 300 knights and numerous foot soldiers and archers.

== Progress ==
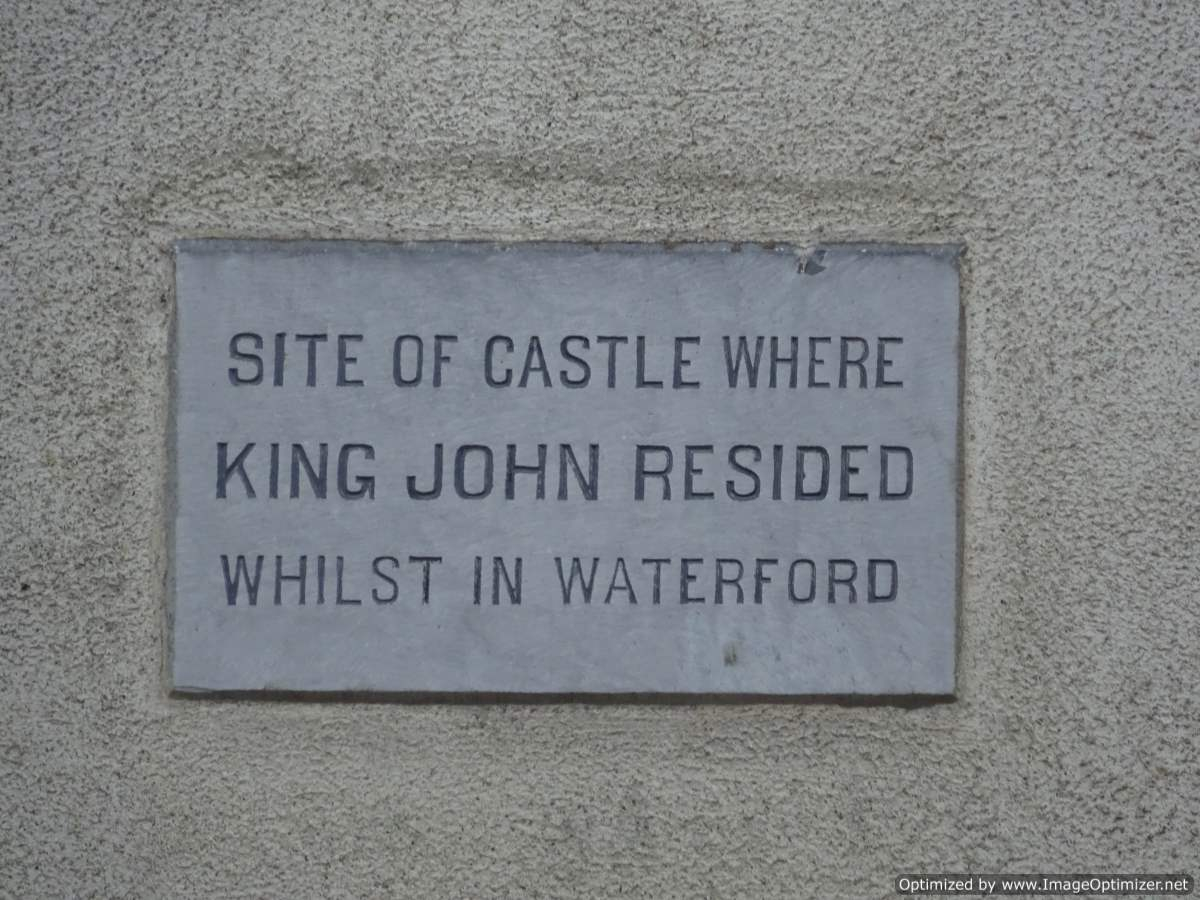
Plaque in Waterford marking the site of the castle where John stayed.

Upon his arrival in Ireland, John and his retinue were greeted by numerous unnamed Gaelic Irish leaders. It is said that upon seeing these strange long bearded Kings, John and his retinue laughed and pulled them about by their beards. Gerald of Wales said that the Irish then complained to their overlords — men such as Domhnall Mór Ó Briain — of how John was "an ill-mannered child... from whom no good could be hoped". Aside from upsetting these rulers, John also at this time engaged in a vigorous program of extending land grants to trusted royal administrators such as Theobald Walter, William de Burgh, Gilbert Pipard and Bertram de Verdun as well as other minor land grants to lesser figures. Their Hiberno-Norman descendants, such as Walter's Butler dynasty, would long remain influential.

During his stay in Ireland, John largely followed the route his father Henry II had taken in 1171–72, landing in Waterford and ending up in Dublin. John's expedition built two significant castles along the way, being Ardfinnan Castle and Lismore Castle on the borders of South Tipperary and West Waterford. At Ardfinnan Castle he issued several royal charters, self titling himself “King of Limerick”. He also established the foundations of administration and law which he later expanded upon in his second expedition in 1210.

== Departure ==
John alienated many of the island's resident elites (Irish and English), lost most of his army in battle or through desertion, and returned to England less than a year after arriving. Scholars have largely agreed that this was most likely to do with the presence of Hugh de Lacy but it is also likely that John ran out of money. It has been suggested that his departure was a setback in much broader plan to set up administrative structures in Ireland in order to control the unruly Barons via loyal, royalist forces such as Walter, De Burgh and De Verdon and that when De Lacy began to threaten his position, he escaped back to the safety of England.

Upon his departure, his father Henry granted the office of justiciar to the Baron John de Courcy, who had massive influence in Ulster. In 1186 Hugh De Lacy was assassinated by an Irishman and plans were made to send John back to Ireland. However, the death of his brother, Geoffrey II, Duke of Brittany, in France cancelled these plans and John did not return to Ireland until his second expedition in 1210.

== Historiography ==
The expedition has attracted much historical debate due to the lack of government records available and the subsequent reliance on sources such as the Irish Annals and the writings of Gerald.
