= Róis Ní Chonchobair =

Irish princess fl.1180 – 1224

Róis Ní Chonchobair, (also Rose O'Connor) Princess of Connacht and Ireland, Lady of Meath, (fl. 1180 – 1224).

== Early life ==
Róis was one of some thirteen children of King of Ireland, Ruaidrí Ua Conchobair (anglicised as Rory O'Connor). Her mother may have been Dubchoblaig, a daughter of Tigernán Ua Ruairc. This would have given her descent from Ua Ruairc kings of Bréifne and, via Princess Derbforgaill, the Ua Máel Sechnaill kings of Meath.

== First marriage – the de Lacy family ==
About 1180 she was married to Hugh de Lacy, Lord of Meath (before 1179 to 1186). The Dublin annals of Inisfallen, Trinity College Dublin (MS. 1281) written c. 1180, record "Rois ingean Rughruidhe h Conchubhair do posad do Hugo de Lacy". This marriage angered King Henry II of England, as it had been undertaken without his permission. Henry II may have feared that De Lacy was gaining too much power, and might, with this marriage, be planning to succeed Ruaidrí Ua Conchobair as king of Ireland. To curtail this possibility, Henry II recalled De Lacy to England, twice, in 1179 and 1181. Marriage to Róis gave Hugh de Lacy a family connection and alliance with the high-king of Ireland, as well as familial connections with the territories, Meath and Bréifne, which he was keen to gain control of.

De Lacy had five sons and two daughters by his first wife Rohese of Monmouth (sometimes called Rose de Monmouth). Róis Ní Chonchobair was the mother of two further children, William Gorm de Lacy and Ysota de Lacy. William later married Gwenllian, daughter of Llywelyn ap Iorwerth, Prince of Gwynedd and Tangwystl ferch Llywarch Goch.

Róis's name is thought to be the first recorded instance of the name amongst the native Irish population. As a result of this, it has been suggested that the author of the annals might have mixed her given name up with that of her husband Hugh de Lacy's first wife, Rohese, who was sometimes recorded as Rose.

At Hugh’s death in 1186, Róis' children were still very young but they seem to have been considered a key part of the de Lacy family and the network of kin and alliances they sought to build in Ireland. Walter de Lacy, her eldest stepson became lord of Meath in succession to his father, and inherited much of his father’s lands in England, Wales and Normandy. He was married to Margaret de Braose, the daughter of Maud de St. Valery and William de Braose, 4th Lord of Bramber (d. 1211), who held Limerick in Ireland amongst his territories. The de Lacy family also built their influence through strategic marriages, so by the time Róis' children reached adulthood, the de Lacy's were the leading Anglo Norman clan in Ireland. Hugh de Lacy the younger had control of Ulster by 1204.

== Second marriage ==
Róis married for a second time some time after Hugh's death, to an Anglo-Norman named le Blund. Róis is believed to have had a number of children in this marriage, including Thomas, Henry, and an unnamed son, all with the surname le Blund.

In 1224, Cathal Crobderg Ua Conchobair, King of Connacht, died. He was succeeded by his son Aedh Ua Conchobair who began a campaign against the de Lacy family. His first target was Róis' stepson Walter de Lacy. Aedh attacked and destroyed his castle at Lissardowlan, Co. Longford, in May, killing everyone there ‘both Foreigners and Irish’. On 19 June, William Marshal, 2nd Earl of Pembroke, recently appointed Justiciar of Ireland, ordered a successful attack on William Gorm, killing one of his le Blund half-brothers, presumed to be a son of Róis. William was forced to flee onto a moor, where he threw himself "on the mercy of the Irish". As a result of this defeat, Róis, her daughters in law Gwenllian and the unnamed wife of Thomas le Blund, took refuge in William’s castle on Ua Ragallaig’s crannog. Cathal Ua Ragallaig, an ally of Aedh Ua Conchobair convinced William Marshal to support him in taking the caslte at the crannog and it eventually fell from de Lacy control to a combined force of Anglo-Norman and Irish troops. Róis was captured. Just a day later Kilmore castle fell and its constable, another of Róis’ sons, Henry le Blund, was ousted.

== Diplomatic negotiation ==
The military action by Aedh Ua Conchobair was judged to be in breach of the king’s peace, as Walter de Lacy was under the king's protection. However, Aedh was an important player in the power struggle in the area and his goodwill was required by King Henry III as part of his control over Ireland. Consequently Róis, captured at Ua Ragallaig’s crannog, was pressed into action as a diplomatic go between. She sat at the centre of a complex web of intermarried Irish and Norman families who were warring for control of Ireland. Not only was she mother of William de Lacy and Walter's step mother, but she was also first cousin to Aedh, albeit born into the different branch of the Uí Chonchobair extended family. William Marshal gave Róis fifteen days to convince Aedh to return to holding the king’s peace or she and her daughters in law would be imprisoned. She succeeded in persuading him of the case.
