= Hanning =

Hanning is a surname. Notable people with the surname include:

- August Hanning (born 1946), German civil servant
- Loy Hanning (1917–1986), American Major League Baseball pitcher
- Reinhold Hanning (1921–2017), German SS guard at Auschwitz concentration camp
- Rob Hanning, American television writer and producer
- Robert W. Hanning, American medievalist

== See also ==
- Hann function, a discrete window function
- John Hanning Speke (1827–1864), English explorer and officer
