= Baderon of Monmouth =

- Born: c. 1100
- Died: 1176
- Other names: Baderon fitzWilliam
- Known for: Lord of Monmouth
- Spouse: Rohese de Clare
- Children: Gilbert fitzBaderon; Rohese of Monmouth; Payn; Robert
- Parent(s): William fitzBaderon; Hawise of Monmouth
- Relatives: John of Monmouth (grandson)

Baderon of Monmouth (c. 1100–1176), also known as Baderon fitzWilliam, was lord of Monmouth between about 1125 and 1176.

== Biography ==
Baderon succeeded his father, William fitzBaderon, as lord of Monmouth in about 1125, when his father either died or retired to become a monk. Baderon confirmed the possessions of the Priory at Monmouth granted by his predecessors, and extended them. His sister Margaret, whose son Robert became prior of Monmouth, and whose second husband, Hugh fitzRichard, was a landowner in Worcestershire, made further grants of land to the priory. Baderon also became responsible for Goodrich Castle, which he is believed to have developed and extended.

At some point after 1130 Baderon married Rohese de Clare (or Rohesia), the daughter of Gilbert fitzRichard de Clare, and the sister of Gilbert de Clare, who was the lord of Striguil (or Chepstow) and later became Earl of Pembroke. The marriage took place at Chepstow, and brought together the families of the two neighbouring, and sometimes rival, lordships. Baderon and Rohese had two sons, James and Gilbert, and at least one daughter, Rohese of Monmouth, who married Hugh de Lacy, Lord of Meath, before 1155.

He was a contemporary and possible kinsman of Geoffrey of Monmouth, who was born in the same town at around the same date. Baderon died in 1176. He was succeeded as lord of Monmouth by his son Gilbert, who was in turn succeeded by his own son, John of Monmouth, in 1190.
