= Romance of Thebes =

French romance composed around 1150

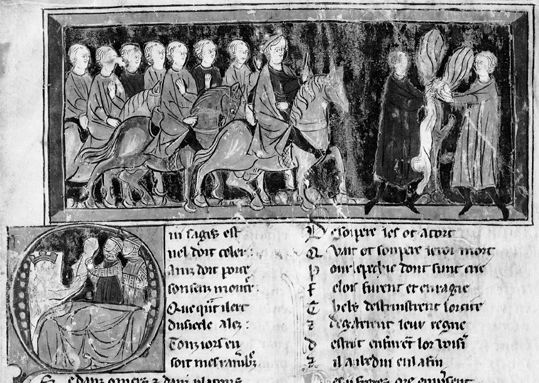
Romance of Thebes

The Romance of Thebes (Le Roman de Thèbes) is a poem of some 10,000 lines that appears to be based on an abridged version of the Thebaid of Statius. This view is supported by the omission of incidents and details which, in spite of the altered conditions under which the poem was composed, would naturally have been preserved in any imitation of the Thebaid, while again certain modifications of the version of Statius can hardly be due to the author's invention but point to an ancient origin.

As in other poems of the same kind, the marvellous disappears; the Greeks adopt the French methods of warfare and the French code of chivalric love. The Roman dates from the 12th century (c. 1150-55), and is written, not in the tirades of the chansons de geste, but in octosyllabic rhymed couplets. It was once attributed to Benoît de Sainte-Maure; but all that can be said is that the Thebes is prior to the Roman de Troie, of which Benoît was undoubtedly the author.

The Thebes is preserved also in several French prose redactions, the first of which, printed in the 16th century under the name of Edipus, belongs to the early years of the 13th century, and originally formed part of a compilation of ancient history, Histoire ancienne jusqu'à Caesar. The first volume of Les histoires de Paul Crose traduites en français contains a free and amplified version of the Thebes.

== Influence ==
The Siege of Thebes, translated from a French redaction of the Roman de Thebes in about 1420 by John Lydgate was a supplementary Canterbury Tale, that was printed by Wynkyn de Worde about 1500.

From the Roman de Thebes also were possibly derived the Ipomedon and its sequel Protheselaus, two romans d'aventures written about the end of the 12th century by Hugh of Rhuddlan, an Anglo-Norman poet who lived in Credenhill, near Hereford. The author asserts that he translated from a Latin book lent him by Gilbert Fitz-Baderon, 4th lord of Monmouth, but in reality he has written romances of chivalry on the usual lines, the names of the characters alone being derived from antiquity.
