= Ipomedon =

Romance in Anglo-Norman verse by Hugh of Rhuddlan

Ipomedon is a romance composed in Anglo-Norman verse by Hugh of Rhuddlan in the late 12th century at Credenhill near Hereford. In the sequel Protheselaus, which must have been composed slightly later, Hugh acknowledges as his patron Gilbert fitzBaderon, lord of Monmouth. Gilbert's death in or just before 1191 gives an approximate terminus ante quem to both romances.

Ipomedon is comparatively rich in references to the real world in which the poet lived. He names himself in full Hue de Rotelande (line 33 and two other places) and confirms that his house was at Credenhill: A Credehulle a ma meisun (line 10571). He mentions the siege of Rouen by King Louis VII of France in 1174 (lines 5351-5352), and also names a Welsh king called "Ris", almost certainly Rhys ap Gruffydd (line 8942). He has a backhanded compliment for the well-known writer Walter Map, evidently a friend or rival: Sul ne sai pas de mentir l'art: Walter Map reset ben sa part ("I am not the only one who knows the art of lying: Walter Map is equally good at it" (lines 7185-7186). A certain "Huge de Hungrie" who appears in the poem as a seducer of women is generally thought to represent Hugh, canon of Hereford, another friend or rival.

Many of the names of characters are inspired by the Roman de Thebes ("Romance of Thebes"), a medieval retelling of the ancient mythological tales of Thebes composed around 1150 by a French poet in the court of Henry II of England and Eleanor of Aquitaine. The story of Ipomedon cannot be traced to this, or to the romances of Chrétien de Troyes as argued by Kölbing, or to any other single source. It is essentially a new story, in which the knight Ipomedon, in love with a princess, conceals his identity and serves her as cupbearer. He departs to show his knightly prowess in overseas adventures; returns to take part in a three-day tournament under three different disguises; defends his heroine from three monsters, still disguised; then, finally, reveals his identity and triumphantly marries her. The style is often parodic and burlesque, sometimes also erotic. This is the only known text that provides the Anglo-Norman form of what is now an English four-letter word:

Quant si beaus out les membres tuz,
K'en dites vus de cel desuz,
Ke nus apelum le cunet?
Je quit qe asez fut petitet: (lines 2267-2270).

"If all the parts of her body were so beautiful, what do you say of the part underneath that we call 'cunt'?" "I think it was nice and small."

Ipomedon was widely popular. It is known from several manuscripts, and there is one surviving fragment of a version in which the Anglo-Norman dialect has been converted to continental Old French. At least three translations into middle English exist (see Ipomadon). A prose version entitled The Life of Ipomydon, translated by Robert Copland, was published by Wynkyn de Worde at the end of the 15th century.

== Bibliography ==
Editions of the Anglo-Norman text

- A. J. Holden, ed., Ipomedon: poème de Hue de Rotelande (fin du XIIe siècle). Lutetiae: Klincksieck, 1979
- E. Kölbing, E. Koschwitz, eds, Ipomedon, ein französischer Abenteuerroman. Breslau, 1889

Translations

- Neil M. R Cartlidge; Judith Weiss, trans., Ipomedon: A Twelfth-Century Romance in the French of England (Cambridge, 2025)

Further reading

- William Calin, "The Exaltation and Undermining of Romance: Ipomedon" in Norris J. Lacy and others, eds, The Legacy of Chrétien de Troyes
- Lucy M. Gay, "Hue de Rotelande's Ipomédon and Chrétien de Troyes" in PMLA vol. 32 (1917) pp. 468-491
- Walther Hahn, Der Wortschatz des Dichters Hue de Rotelande. Berlin, 1910
- Robert W. Hanning, "Engin in Twelfth Century Romance: An Examination of the Roman d'Enéas and Hue de Rotelande's Ipomedon" in Yale French Studies no. 51 (1974) pp. 82-101
- Dominica Legge, Anglo-Norman Literature and its Background (Oxford, 1963)
- Charles H. Livingston, "Manuscript Fragments of a Continental French Version of the Roman d'Ipomedon in Modern Philology vol. 40 (1942) pp. 117-130
- André de Mandach, Naissance et développement de la chanson de geste en Europe, IV: Chanson d'Aspremont (Geneva: Droz, 1980) pp. 18-27
- Adolfo Mussafia, "Sulla critica del testo del romanzo in francese antico Ipomedon" in Sitzungsberichte, Kaiserliche Academie der Wissenschaften: Philosophisch-historische Classe (Vienna, 1890)
