= Rohese de Clare =

Anglo-Norman noblewoman (died before 1166)

- Died: bef. 1166
- Other name: Rohese de Monemue
- Spouse: Baderon of Monmouth
- Children: Gilbert fitzBaderon; Rohese of Monmouth; Payn; Robert
- Parents: Gilbert Fitz Richard (father); Adeliza de Clermont (mother)
- Relatives: Gilbert de Clare, 1st Earl of Pembroke (brother); Walter fitzGilbert de Clare (brother)

Rohese de Clare (bef. 1166) was a member of the wealthy and powerful Anglo-Norman de Clare family, and a strong patron of Monmouth Priory.

== Life ==
Rohese was a daughter of Gilbert Fitz Richard de Clare (c. 1066–c. 1117) and Adeliza de Clermont. Her father was an influential Anglo-Norman baron who was granted the Lordship of Cardigan, in Wales c. 1107–1111. Her paternal grandmother Rohese Giffard was one of the few women mentioned in the 1086 Domesday Book as holding land in her own right.

Around 1130, Rohese married Baderon fitzWilliam of Monmouth. Her father being already dead by that date, the wedding was celebrated at Striguil Castle (Chepstow), the stronghold of her brother Gilbert Fitz Gilbert de Clare, who gave the bride away.

Rohese is most notable for her generosity to Monmouth Priory beginning soon after her marriage. As a married woman she acted through her husband, who records in the charter that the gifts were made "by myself and my wife, at her request ... at the Feast of All Saints on the same day on which she was married to me at Striguil". The gift was put into effect "on the Feast of St. Martin next following" at a ceremony at Monmouth attended by Rohese's brothers Walter and Gilbert and by Gilbert's wife Isabel de Beaumont (a former mistress of Henry I). The gift consisted of a tithe of the regular revenues of the town of Monmouth, to be paid in installments three times each year. In 1144, Rohese and Baderon made further donations to Monmouth Priory.

== Family ==
Together Rohese and Baderon had four recorded children. Gilbert fitzBaderon succeeded his father as lord of Monmouth. Rohese of Monmouth married Hugh de Lacy, Lord of Meath about 1155 and had eight children. She continued her mother's support of Monmouth Priory. Less is known about their sons Payn (fl. 1144) and Robert (fl. 1144).
