= Meiler Fitzhenry =

Lord Chief Justice of Ireland

Meiler FitzHenry (sometimes spelled Meilyr; died 1220) was a Cambro-Norman nobleman and Lord Chief Justice of Ireland during the Lordship of Ireland.

== Background and early life ==
Meilyr FitzHenry was the son of Henry FitzHenry, an illegitimate son of King Henry I, by Nest, daughter of Rhys ap Tewdwr, the last king of Deheubarth (South Wales). He was thus related to the noblest Norman and native families of South Wales. Robert Fitz-Stephen, Maurice FitzGerald, David FitzGerald, bishop of St. David's, and William FitzGerald of Carew were his uncles. Meilyr's cousins included Raymond le Gros, Gerald of Wales, prince Rhys ap Gruffydd, the famous Lord Rhys, as well as Henry II.

In 1158 his father, Henry FitzHenry, was killed in battle during Henry II's campaign in Wales. Meilyr, Henry's oldest son, succeeded to his father's possessions of Narberth and Pebidiog, the central and north-eastern parts of the modern Pembrokeshire.

== In Ireland ==
In 1169 he accompanied his uncle Robert FitzStephen on his first expedition to Ireland, arriving in May 1169. During the initial stages of the Anglo-Norman conquest of Ireland, FitzHenry gained a reputation for bravery that bordered on foolhardiness.

He first distinguished himself in the invasion of Ossory along with his cousin Robert de Barry, older brother of Giraldus Cambrensis in 1169. FitzHenry played a prominent role in this campaign led by Diarmait mac Murchada, King of Leinster, against Domnall mac Gilla Pátraic, King of Osraige, in Laois. Following this campaign, FitzHenry was then part of his uncle Robert FitzStephen's expedition to aid Domnall Mór Ua Briain, King of Thomond.

In 1171, FitzHenry was part of the group of Anglo-Normans that broke the Siege of Dublin by the attacking army led by Ruaidrí Ua Conchobair, King of Connacht. In 1172, he was assigned to the garrison of Hugh de Lacy by the king.

In 1173, the return of Richard de Clare, 2nd Earl of Pembroke, named Strongbow, to England threw Ireland into revolt. Meilyr was then in garrison at Waterford, and made a rash sortie against the Irish. He pursued them into the woods, and was surrounded. But he cut a way through them with his sword, and arrived back at Waterford with three Irish axes in his horse and two on his shield.

In 1174 he returned with his cousin, Raymond le Gros to Wales, but le Gros and FitzHenry both returned back to Ireland in 1174. On his return to Ireland, FitzHenry was granted a cantred in Kildare around Carbury, but was deprived of this grant by King John's representatives John de Lacy and Richard de Pec. Instead, the king was granted a densely forested region of Laois, which was seen as a more fitting place for him. In October 1175 he accompanied Raymond le Gros in his expedition against Limerick, was second to swim over the River Shannon, and with his cousin David stood the attack of the Irish until the rest of the army had crossed over.

He was one of the band of Geraldines who under Raymond met the new governor, William FitzAldhelm, at Waterford, and at once incurred his jealousy. Hugh de Lacy, the next Justice, took away Meilyr's Kildare estate, but gave him Leix in exchange, a marcher district. In 1182 de Lacy again became Chief Justice, built a castle on Meilyr's Leix estate at Timahoe, and gave him his niece as a wife. It seems probable that Meilyr had already been married, but he hitherto had no legitimate children. This childlessness was, in Giraldus's opinion, God's punishment to him for the want of respect to the church.

== Under King John ==
Around 1198, FitzHenry was appointed justiciar of Ireland by John, Lord of Ireland (future King of England). He was reappointed by John, now King, in June 1200. In June 1200 Meilyr was in attendance with King John in Normandy, and on 28 October of that year received a grant of two cantreds in Kerry, and one in Cork. About the same time he was appointed to Ireland as Lord Chief Justice, the King reserving to himself pleas touching the crown, the mint, and the exchange. During his six years' government Meilyr had to contend against the factiousness of the Norman nobles. John de Courci, the conqueror of Ulster, was a constant source of trouble to him. The establishment of Hugh de Lacy as Earl of Ulster (29 May 1205) was a great triumph for FitzHenry. Before long, however, war broke out between Lacy and FitzHenry.

Another lawless Norman noble was William de Burgh who was now engaged in the conquest of Connaught. But while De Burgh was devastating that region, FitzHenry and his assessor, Walter de Lacy, led a host into de Burgh's Munster estates (1203). De Burgh lost his estates, though on appeal to King John he ultimately recovered them all, except those in Connaught. FitzHenry had similar troubles with Richard Tirel and other nobles. Walter de Lacy, at one time his chief colleague, quarrelled with him in 1206 about the baronies of Limerick.

In 1204 he was directed by the king to build a castle in Dublin to serve as a court of justice, as well as a means of defence. He was also to compel the citizens of Dublin to fortify the city itself. In 1207 FitzHenry was given the land of Offaly by King John, taken from under the lordship of William Marshal, 1st Earl of Pembroke, thereby incurring hatred from the fellow barons of Ireland and head families. Those dissatisfied with King John's decision to hand over Offaly petitioned for its return, from which they received a strong rebuke from John Marshal, William Marshal's nephew, who had been named marshal of Ireland by King John. King John summoned Meiler FitzHenry, William Marshal, and other men to discuss the matter, during which FitzHenry instructed his men to attack Leinster, the land held by William Marshal who was also FitzHenry's lord. Receiving minor punishment, FitzHenry was allowed to return to Ireland with three letters that summoned to England the officers that were protecting Leinster for William Marshal. These men refused to leave their lord's land unprotected and so fought off the attacks by FitzHenry and his men. Ultimately, Meiler FitzHenry and his men were captured, their first born sons, or whatever children were available, demanded as a sign of good behavior. FitzHenry held the justiciarship until 1208, at the conclusion of Offaly being returned to William Marshal. The last writ addressed to him in that capacity is dated 19 June 1208. John Thomas Gilbert stated that he was superseded between 1203 and 1205 by Hugh de Lacy, but many writs are addressed to him as Justice during these years. On several occasions assessors or counsellors were associated with him in his work, and he was directed to do nothing of exceptional importance without their advice (e.g. Hugh de Lacy in 1205).

FitzHenry remained one of the most powerful of Irish barons, even after he ceased to be Justiciar. About 1212 his name appears immediately after that of William Marshal, 1st Earl of Pembroke in the protest of the Irish barons against the threatened deposition of John by the Pope, and the declaration of their willingness to live and die for the king. Several gifts from the king marked John's appreciation of his administration of Ireland. But it was not till August 1219 that all the expenses incurred during his viceroyalty were defrayed from the exchequer. He must by that date have been a very old man. Already in 1216 it was thought likely that he would die, or at least retire from the world into a monastery.

== Death ==
There is no reference to his acts after 1219, and he died in 1220. He was buried in the chapter-house at Great Connell Priory in County Kildare.

== Legacy ==
He founded in 1202 Great Connell Priory in County Kildare, which he handed over to the Austin canons of Llanthony, near Gloucester. This he endowed with large estates, with all the churches and benefices in his Irish lands, with a tenth of his household expenses, rents, and produce.

== Family ==
By the niece of Hugh de Lacy, Meilyr fathered a son, also named Meilyr, who in 1206 was old enough to dispossess William de Braose of Limerick, and whose forays into Tyrconnell had already spread devastation among the Irish. FitzHenry's older brother, Robert Fitzhenry, had died around 1180.
