= Hugh of Rhuddlan =

Cambro-Norman poet

- Occupations: Poet; Cleric
- Years active: Late 12th century

Hugh of Rhuddlan (Anglo-Norman: Hue de Rotelande) was an important Cambro-Norman poet writing in the Anglo-Norman language at the end of the 12th century. He has been described as one of 'Angevin England's most mercurial literary figures'.

== Life ==
Hugh was a cleric and a native of Rhuddlan. He wrote in Credenhill, Herefordshire. Gilbert de Monmouth Fitz Baderon, a grandson of Gilbert Fitz Richard, was his patron.

== Works ==
His works are Ipomedon and Protheselaus, two long metrical romances from the 1180s of over 10,000 lines, in octosyllables. The names, at least, were from the mid-century Le Roman de Thèbes; the romances are set in Italy. Protheselaus has been poorly regarded for its lack of narrative. The story describes the heroes journeys after hearing that Medea had rejected him as an admirer. He risks death, serves at the court of Medea and in imprisoned, but he is eventually reunited with Medea and they marry.

Several Middle English translations (Ipomadon, cited as Ippomedon in Thomas Warton, The History of English Poetry) were made.

A sixteenth century translation The Life of Ipomydon was made by Robert Copland and printed by Wynkyn de Worde.
