= Richard Hyrde =

Richard Hyrde or Hirt (died 1528) was an English humanist scholar, translator and tutor. He was closely associated with the household of Thomas More, and with the contemporary discussion of female education.

He graduated at the University of Oxford in 1518, possibly having been supported in his education by More. He worked in the 1520s on the English translation of the Latin work De institutione foeminae Christianae by Juan Luis Vives, commissioned by Catherine of Aragon. Hyrde's translation was printed later (around 1540) as The Instruction of a Christen Woman [sic]. It became a popular conduct book. One aspect of the teaching of Vives was the restriction of women's reading of romances. To the list of texts Vives supplied, none in English, Hyrde added others: "Parthenope, Genarides, Hippomadon, William and Melyour, Libius and Arthur, Guye, Beuis and others".

He also contributed an introduction to the translation Treatise upon the Pater Noster by Margaret Roper (More's daughter) of a Latin work Precatio Dominica of Erasmus. There he argues for the entitlement of women to a scholarly education. More himself was involved in both of Hyrde's works, revising the Vives translation before it saw print, and dealing with the formal publication permission of his daughter's work via Thomas Wolsey.

R. W. Chambers states that he was a physician, connecting this vocation with the knowledge of Greek Hyrde advocates. In 1528 he was part of a diplomatic mission to Pope Clement VII, led by Stephen Gardiner and Edward Foxe (attached, Chambers says, as physician). He died in 1528 in Italy of an infectious disease.
