= Lord High Constable of Ireland =

The office of Lord High Constable of Ireland was used during coronations of the monarch of the United Kingdom after the Acts of Union 1800. The office was abolished after the creation of the Irish Free State in 1922.

== Medieval holders ==
- Hugh de Lacy, Lord of Meath (died 1186) "the Constable of Ireland, as he is named in the "Annals of the Four Masters""
- Walter de Lacy, Lord of Meath (died 1241)
- Sir John de Verdun, Lord of Westmeath (son of Theobald le Botiller, 2nd Chief Butler of Ireland and Roesia de Verdun) and husband of Margaret, daughter of Gilbert de Lacy and coheir of the last-mentioned Walter de Lacy (died 1278) "[Margaret de Lacy] married John de Verdon, who thereby obtained the moiety of Meath, and also the office of Constable of Ireland."
- Theobald de Verdon, 1st Baron Verdon (died 24 August 1309)
- Theobald de Verdun, 2nd Baron Verdun (died 27 July 1316)

The Barony of Verdon fell into abeyance on the death of Theobald in 1316.

- John Talbot, 1st Earl of Shrewsbury and Waterford, husband of Maud Nevill, 6th Baroness Furnivall, great-granddaughter of Joan de Verdun, daughter of the above-mentioned Theobald, described himself as "Senescallus ac Constabularius Hiberniae" or "Steward and Constable of Ireland"
- George Talbot, 4th Earl of Shrewsbury and Waterford, great-grandson of the 1st Earl of Shrewsbury, was described as "Senescallus ac Constabularius Hiberniae" or "Steward and Constable of Ireland" in a deed of 2 July, 24 Henry VII and in two deeds of 19 July, 13 Henry VIII (1521)

== Lords High Constable of Ireland at Coronations ==
At this point, the office merged with the Crown and was revived only for coronations. It was held at coronations by the following individuals:

Name	Year	Notes	Sources
Henry Petty-Fitzmaurice, 3rd Marquess of Lansdowne	1821	Coronation of King George IV	
Augustus FitzGerald, 3rd Duke of Leinster	1831	Coronation of King William IV and Queen Adelaide	
Augustus FitzGerald, 3rd Duke of Leinster	1838	Coronation of Queen Victoria	
James Hamilton, 2nd Duke of Abercorn	1902	Coronation of King Edward VII and Queen Alexandra	
James Hamilton, 2nd Duke of Abercorn	1911	Coronation of King George V and Queen Mary	

== See also ==
- Lord High Constable of England
- Lord High Constable of Scotland
