= Protheselaus =

Protheselaus is a verse romance composed in Anglo-Norman by Hugh of Rhuddlan at the end of the 12th century. Hugh lived at Credenhill near Hereford, according to his earlier poem Ipomedon. Protheselaus is dedicated to Hugh's patron Gilbert fitzBaderon, lord of Monmouth. Gilbert died in or just before 1191: that date is a terminus ante quem for the completion of Protheselaus.

It is a sequel to Ipomedon in the same sense in which sequels were composed to the chansons de geste: Protheselaus is introduced as the son of Ipomedon, he has adventures that are similar to his father's, and faces similar problems. He is deprived of his inheritance. He is in love with Medea and believes (wrongly, it appears) that she hates him. With the help of Dardanus and Melander he attempts to conciliate her and travels through distant lands to prove his knightly prowess, then returns and enters her service in disguise. He travels to Burgundy, defends Ismeine, is made prisoner by the "Maiden of the Isle" (Pucele de l'Isle), finally escapes, recovers his inheritance and marries Medea.

Although Protheselaus is a continuation of the story of Ipomedon it has a different atmosphere In Ipomedonte auctor. In place of the satire, burlesque and occasional eroticism of Ipomedon the characters in Protheselaus -- especially the hero himself and his friends Dardanus and Melander -- are virtuous, selfless, and motivated by concern for the wellbeing of others. By contrast with Ipomedon, Protheselaus attracted relatively few readers in later times and was not translated into other languages.

== Bibliography ==
Editions of the Anglo-Norman text

- Franz Kluckow, ed., Hue de Rotelande: Protheselaus. Göttingen, 1924
- A. J. Holden, ed., Protheselaus by Hue de Rotelande. London: Anglo-Norman Text Society. 3 vols

Further reading

- William Calin, "The Exaltation and Undermining of Romance: Ipomedon" in Norris J. Lacy and others, eds, The Legacy of Chrétien de Troyes
- Walther Hahn, Der Wortschatz des Dichters Hue de Rotelande. Berlin, 1910
- F. Lecoy, "Un episode du Protheselaus et le conte du mari trompé" in Romania vol. 76 (1955)
- Dominica Legge, Anglo-Norman Literature and its Background (Oxford, 1963) pp. 86-95
- André de Mandach, Naissance et développement de la chanson de geste en Europe, IV: Chanson d'Aspremont (Geneva: Droz, 1980) pp. 18-27
- R. M. Spensley, "Form and Meaning in Hue de Rotelande's Protheselaus" in Modern Language Review vol. 67 (1972) pp. 763-774
