= Council of Oxford =

Council during the reign of Henry II

The Council of Oxford was a historical council where Henry II of England granted Cork and Limerick to English barons, provided for the administration of Leinster, and made his son John the Lord of Ireland. It was established in the 1170s and lasted until 1258, when the Oxford Parliament (also known as the "Mad Parliament") ended the council during the reign of Henry III of England.
