= Geoffrey de Marisco =

Justiciar of Ireland (died 1245)

- Died: 1245; France
- Occupation: Justiciar of Ireland

Geoffrey de Marisco (died 1245) was the justiciar of Ireland. He held considerable power in Ireland during the reign of King John and the early reign of Henry III. Among his activities were helping to prosecute wars against the native Irish rulers. In 1245 he was accused of treason and executed shortly thereafter.

== Name and background ==
His name, which, translated, is simply Marsh, was as common in England in the Middle Ages as the marshes from which it was derived (Monumenta Franciscana, vol. i. Pref. p. lxxvii), and the compilers of the pedigrees of the family of Mountmorres, or Montmorency, have caused much confusion by importing into their schemes the names of all persons of any note who were known by that common appellation, or by one at all like it [see under Mount-Maurice, Hervey de]. Nothing seems certain about Marisco's parentage further than that he was a nephew of John Comyn (d. 1212), archbishop of Dublin (Documents, No. 276), a fact which may account for his rise to wealth and power in Ireland; and that his mother was alive in 1220 (Royal Letters, Henry III, i. 128).

== Career ==
=== Under King John ===
Marisco was powerful in the south of Munster and Leinster, and appears to have received large grants of land in Ireland from King John. He was with the king at Ledbury, Gloucestershire, in 1200 (Documents, No. 137), and received a grant of 'Katherain' in exchange for other lands in Ireland, together with twenty marks, to fortify a house there for himself (ib. No. 139). When war broke out among the English in Leinster, the lords and others who were discontented with the government of the justiciar Hugh de Lacy seem to have looked on Marisco as their leader. He was joined by a number of the natives, seized Limerick (Annals of Worcester, p. 396), and inflicted a severe defeat on the justiciar at Thurles in Munster (Annals of the Four Masters, iii. 15, 171; Annals ap. Chartularies of St. Mary's Abbey, ii. 311). For this he obtained the king's pardon (Gilbert, ut supra, p. 66), and in 1210 made successful war against the Irish of Connaught (Annals of Loch CS, i. 239, 245). When Innocent III was threatening, in or about 1211, to absolve John's subjects from their allegiance, he joined the other magnates of Ireland in making a protestation of loyalty (Documents, No. 448). In the summer of 1215 he was with the king at Marlborough, and on 6 July was appointed justiciar of Ireland, giving two of his sons as pledges for his behaviour (ib. Nos. 604, 608).

=== Henry III's demands ===
On the accession of Henry III he advised that Queen Isabella, or her second son, Richard, should reside in Ireland (Gilbert, ut supra, p. 80). He built a castle at Killaloe, co. Clare, in 1217, and forced the people to accept an English bishop, Robert Travers, apparently one of his own relatives (Annals of the Four Masters, iii. 90; Documents, Nos. 1026, 2119). In 1218 he was ordered to raise money to enable the king to pay Louis, the son of the French king, the sum promised to him, and to pay the papal tribute. He was ordered in 1219 to pay the revenues of the crown into the exchequer at Dublin, and to present himself before the king, leaving Ireland in the care of Henry of London, archbishop of Dublin.

=== Crusade and return ===
Having already taken the cross he received a safe-conduct to make a pilgrimage to the Holy Land (Calendar of Patent Rolls, 3 Hen. Ill, n. 12), and went to England. There in March 1220 he entered into an agreement with the king at Oxford, in the presence of the council, with reference to the discharge of his office, pledging himself to pay the royal revenues into the exchequer, and to appoint faithful constables for the king's castles, and delivering one of his sons to be kept as a hostage by the king (Fœdera, i. 162). On his return to Ireland he was commanded to resume the demesne lands that he had alienated without warrant (Documents, No. 949). Complaints were made against him to the king by the citizens of Dublin, and in July 1221 the king wrote to the council in Ireland, declaring that he had received no money from that country since he came to the throne, and that Marisco, who had while in England made a fine with him to satisfy defaults, had not obeyed his wishes. Henry therefore desired that he should give up his office (ib. No. 1001). Marisco resigned the justiciarship on 4 October, was thanked for his faithful services, quit-claimed of 1,080 marks, part of the fine made with the king, and received a letter of protection during the king's minority, and the wardship of the heir of John de Clahull (ib. Nos. 1015 sqq.)

During the absence of the justiciar, William, the earl-marshal, in 1224, Marisco had charge of the country, and carried on war with Aedh O'Neill. He was reappointed justiciar on 25 June 1226, and, being then in England, received on 4 July a grant of 580l. a year, to be paid out of the Irish exchequer as salary (ib. Nos. 1383, 1413; Fœdera, i. 182). This seems to be the first time that a salary was appointed for the viceroy of Ireland. On his return to Ireland he wrote to the king informing him that Theobald FitzWalter, who had married Marisco's daughter, was refractory, and had garrisoned Dublin Castle against the king. He advised that Theobald should be deprived of the castle of Roscray, and promised that he would use every effort to punish the king's enemies (Royal Letters, i. 290 sqq.) He endeavoured to detain the person of Hugh, or Cathal, O'Conor, king of Connaught; but Hugh was delivered by the intervention of William, the earl-marshal. In revenge, his son Aedh surprised William, the justiciar's son, near Athlone, and made him prisoner; nor could his father obtain his release, except on terms that were highly advantageous to the Connaught people (Annals of the Four Masters, iii. 245). Marisco built the castle of Ballyleague, in the barony of South Ballintober, co. Roscommon, about this time. While Hugh O'Conor was at the justiciar's house, one of Marisco's men slew him, on account of a private quarrel, and Marisco hanged the murderer (ib. p. 247). He resigned the justiciarship at his own wish in February 1228 (Documents, No. 1572). He was reappointed justiciar in 1230, and in July inflicted, with the help of Walter de Lacy and Richard de Burgh, a severe defeat on the Connaught men, under their king, Aedh, who was taken prisoner (Wendover, iv. 213). He resigned the justiciarship in 1232 (Royal Letters, i. 407).

=== Accusation of treason and execution ===
In common with Maurice FitzGerald, then justiciar, and other lords, Marisco in 1234 received a letter written by the king's counsellors, and sealed by him, directing that should Richard, the earl-marshal, come to Ireland he should be taken alive or dead. Marisco accordingly joined the magnates of Ireland in their conspiracy against the marshal, who went to Ireland on hearing that his lands there had been ravaged. As soon as he landed Marisco joined him, and treacherously urged him to march against his enemies, promising him his aid. Acting by his advice, the earl, at a conference with the magnates at the Curragh, Kildare, refused to grant them the truce that they demanded. When they set the battle against him Marisco deserted the earl, who was wounded, taken prisoner, and soon afterwards died (Paris, iii. 273–9). Marisco fell into temporary disgrace with the king for his share in the business, but on 3 August 1235 Henry restored him his lands (Documents, No. 2280). In this year his son William, it is said, slew, at London, a clerk named Henry Clement, a messenger from one of the Irish magnates, and was consequently outlawed (ib. No. 2386). A man who was accused of an intent to assassinate the king at Woodstock in 1238 was said to have been instigated by William de Marisco; his father, Marisco, was suspected of being privy to the scheme, and his lands in Ireland being distrained upon, he fled to Scotland, where he was, with the connivance of Alexander II, sheltered by Walter Comyn, no doubt his kinsman. Henry was indignant with the king of Scots for harbouring him, and made it a special ground of complaint. After the treaty of July 1244 Alexander sent Marisco out of his dominions. He fled to France, where he died friendless and poor in 1245, at an advanced age, for he is described as old in 1234.

Meanwhile, his son had taken refuge on Lundy Island, which he fortified. There he was joined by a number of broken men, and adopted piracy as a means of sustaining life, specially plundering ships laden with wine and provisions. Strict watch was kept, in the hope of taking him, and in 1242 he was taken by craft, carried to London, and there drawn, handed, and quartered, sixteen of his companions being also hanged. In his dying confession he protested his innocence of the death of Clement, and of the attempt on the king's life (Paris, iv. 196). He had married Matilda, niece of Henry, archbishop of Dublin, who gave her land on her marriage (Documents, Nos. 2528, 2853). William had also received a grant of land from the king for his support in 1228 (ib. No. 1640). Marisco appears to have been vigorous and able, a successful commander, and on the whole a just and skilful ruler. Like most of the great men of Ireland at the time, he did not scruple to act treacherously. To the king, however, he seems to have been a faithful servant. The accusation of treason brought against him and his son William is extremely improbable, and their ruin must be considered as a result, of the indignation excited by the fate of the earl-marshal. Marisco founded an Augustinian monastery at Killagh, co. Kerry, called Beaulieu (Monasticon Hibernicum, p. 304), and commanderies of knights hospitallers at Any and Adair, co. Limerick. An engraving of a tomb in the church of Any, which is said to be Marisco's, is in the 'Genealogical Memoir of Montmorency.'

== Marriage and descendants ==
Marisco married Eva de Bermingham (Documents, Nos. 817, 1112), and apparently, for his second wife, a sister of Hugh de Lacy (Wendover, iv. 304; Paris, iii. 277), named Matilda (Documents, No. 2853). Marisco told Richard, the earl-marshal, that his wife was Hugh de Lacy's sister, but the genealogists assert that his second wife was Christiania, daughter of Walter de Riddlesford, baron of Bray, and sister of Hugh de Lacy's wife, Emmeline (Genealogical Memoir, Pedigree, p. ix). This is an error, for Christiania de Riddlesford married Marisco's son Robert (d. 1243), by whom she was the mother of Christiania de Marisco, an heiress of great wealth (Documents, No. 2645 and other numbers; comp. also Calendarium Genealogicum, i. 171). Of Marisco's many sons, William, Robert, Walter, Thomas, Henry, John, and Richard appear in various public records (see Documents passim). He is also said to have had an eldest son Marisco, who settled in Tipperary and died without issue; William was reckoned as his second son; a third and eldest surviving son, named Jordan, married the daughter of the lord of Lateragh, and continued his line; his youngest son was named Stephen (Genealogical Memoir, Pedigree, pp. x, xi, App. p. xl); a daughter is assigned to him named Emmeline, who is said to have married Maurice FitzGerald, 'earl of Desmond' (ib. and App. p. clxvii). The first Earl of Desmond, however, lived much later [see under FitzThomas, Maurice, d. 1356], and the genealogist seems to take for a daughter of Geoffrey de Marisco, Emmeline, daughter and heiress of Emmeline de Riddlesford, wife of Hugh de Lacy, and Stephen Longespee, who married Maurice FitzMaurice (see under FitzGerard, Maurice FitzMaurice, 1238?–1277; Kildare, Earls of Kildare, p. 17). Marisco had a daughter who married Theobald Fitz Walter. The assertion (Genealogical Memoir, Pedigree, p. x) that his son John was viceroy of Ireland in 1206 is erroneous. The father of the viceroy was Geoffrey FitzPeter. Geoffrey the justiciar had nephews named Richard, John Travers, and William FitzJordan (Documents, No. 2119).
