= John of Monmouth (died 1257) =

Feudal lord in the Welsh Marches, died 1257

John of Monmouth (died 1257) was a feudal lord in the Welsh Marches.

== Life ==
He was the son of John of Monmouth and his second wife Agnes, daughter of Walter de Muscegros.

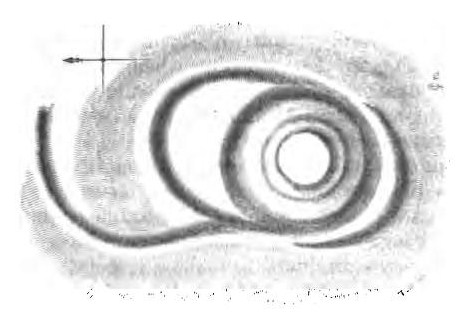
Tumulus near Penrhos, Monmouthshire, possible site of a short-lived disputed castle.

Penrhos Castle was the focus of a sharp dispute the younger John of Monmouth had with William III de Cantilupe. There are official records showing that John was appointed custos of the castle in 1251, and William was pardoned the following year for demolishing it. On the basis of documentary evidence, the castle and the dispute it created lasted from 1248 to 1253.

== Family and legacy ==
John of Monmouth died, according to the Victoria County History of Dorset, without issue. He left Monmouth Castle to Prince Edward. His heirs were Albretha de Boterell and Joan de Nevil, an aunt on his mother's side, and a first cousin.

A recent scholarly source identifies another John of Monmouth, later hanged for murder, to whom this John of Monmouth left property, as a half-brother. It is stated that John of Monmouth married a daughter of David, Earl of Huntingdon.
