= Hugh I of Clermont-en-Beauvaisis =

Hugh I, Count of Clermont-en-Beauvaisis (1030 – 1101), son of Renaud I of Clermont (1010–1088), son-in-law of Baldwin II of Clermont, the second known Count of Clermont. Hugh was an early founder of the House of Clermont.

Hugh married Marguerite de Ramerupt, daughter of Hilduin IV, Count of Montdidier, and his wife Alice de Roucy. Hugh and Marguerite had eight children:

- Renaud II, Count of Clermont-en-Beauvaisis, married Adele of Vermandois
- Gui, who died imprisoned in Rouen in 1119
- Hugues (d. after 1099)
- Ermentrude, married to Hugh d'Avranches, 1st Earl of Chester; many of their offspring and other relatives died in the White Ship disaster of 1120.
- Adelise (Alix), married to Gilbert Fitz Richard, Lord of Clare, whose issue were prominent nobles in England
- Marguerite, married to Gilbert de Gerberoy
- Richilde, married to Dreux II, Sire de Mello
- Emme (Béatrice), Dame de Luzarches, married to Mathieu I, Count of Beaumont-sur-Oise.

Upon his death, Hugh was succeeded as Count of Clermont-en-Beauvaisis by his son Renaud.

== Sources ==
- Guenée, Bernard (1978). "Les généalogies entre l'histoire et la politique: la fierté d'être Capétien, en France, au Moyen Age". Annales. Histoire, Sciences Sociales (in French). 33e Année, No. 3 (May - Jun.): 450–477.
- Johns, Susan M. (2003). Noblewomen, Aristocracy and Power in the Twelfth-Century Anglo-Norman Realm (Gender in History). Manchester University Press.

Prime, Temple, Note on the County of Clermont, Notes Relative to Certain Matters Connected with French History, De Vinne Press, New York, 1903 (available on Google Books)
