= Ipomadon =

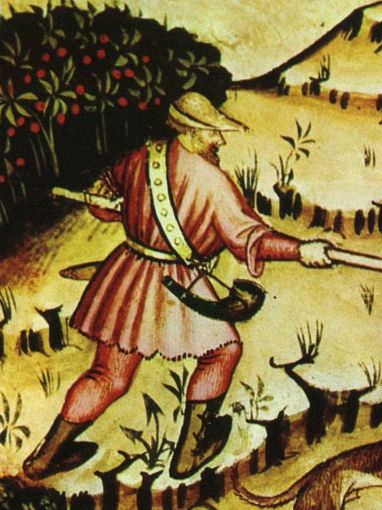
'Ipomadon's favourite pursuit was hunting, and to see his greyhounds run. He would not listen to stories of chivalry and this troubled the 'Proud' very much.'

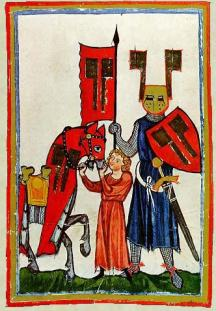
'Jason, greet your lady for me and tell her that you have spoken to me when I was a white knight, and now a red knight—for I cannot stay.'

Ipomadon is a Middle English translation of Hugh of Rhuddlan's Anglo-Norman romance Ipomedon composed in tail-rhyme verse, possibly in the last decade of the fourteenth century. It is one of three Middle English renditions of Hugh's work: the other two are a shorter verse Lyfe of Ipomydon and the prose Ipomedon, both of the fifteenth century. Each version is derived independently from the Anglo-Norman Ipomedon, which Hugh wrote 'not long after 1180', possibly in Herefordshire. It is included in a list of the popular English romances by Richard Hyrde in the 1520s.

The earliest Middle English version is found uniquely in MS Chetham 8009 (Manchester), probably composed in West Yorkshire in the north of England. The tale of Ipomadon is "packed with elaborate description and detail" and follows the adventures of a young knight, Ipomadon, who has a passion for hunting and who chooses to hide his identity from the lady he loves for much of the romance, culminating at the end of the tale in a scene where the hero, having defeated a knight in battle, then claims for a while to be the very knight he has defeated.

== Manuscripts and printed versions ==
Ipomedon in Middle English is found in three versions, all of them probably deriving independently from the late-twelfth century Anglo-Norman original.

The earliest of these surviving versions in Middle English is Ipomadon and occurs in the manuscript Chetham 8009 (Manchester), which contains a unique copy of an 8,891-line tail-rhyme romance, dating in composition to "anywhere between the last decade of the fourteenth century and the middle of the fifteenth century" This version of the tale follows Hugh of Rhuddlan's story quite closely, although abridging it somewhat by cutting battle details and most of Hugh's rather coarse or prosaic narrative intrusions. Composed in a dialect that suggests that it was originally written by a West Yorkshireman in his native West Yorkshire, in the north of England, the manuscript copy itself dates to the late-fifteenth century, is from a London Scriptorium and contains clues that the work from which this copy was taken had itself been re-copied, somewhere down the line, in the southwest of England.

The insistence of the hero Ipomadon, in this Middle English version, to conceal his identity from his lady love, even when he has won her fairly and unambiguously whilst fighting in disguise, at a tournament that has been put on especially for the purpose of selecting a husband for this young queen whom he loves, is treated slightly differently from its source. The anonymous author of this Middle English poem chooses to try to rationalise this behaviour, where the original author Hugh of Rhuddlan is happy to point to its irrationality. However, the "lack of motivation for the hero's deception and delay does not detract significantly from the poem."

A fifteenth century, 2,346-line couplet version of the tale, called The Lyfe of Ipomydon, is found in MS Harley 2252 and also in two printed copies by Wynkyn de Worde, one of them incomplete. Studies of this version, as well as the tail-rhyme romance in MS Chetham 8009 (Manchester), suggest that these poems may have been composed principally for reading aloud to an assembled audience, rather than solely for private reading.

There is also a Middle English prose version of Ipomedon, dating to the fifteenth century and found (incomplete) in the fifteenth century vellum MS Longleat 257.

== Plot ==
(This summary is based upon the tail-rhyme romance Ipomadon found in MS Chatham 8009 (Manchester).)

The majority of the character's names in this medieval romance are taken from Ancient Greece, via the mid-twelfth century Old French Roman de Thèbes, and the action takes place in southern Italy; once Magna Graecia or Megálē Hellás, "Great Greece". King Melyagere (Meleager) of Sicily has a niece who has assumed power in Calabria at the age of fifteen, and has vowed, to the amused indulgence of her noblemen, to marry a man only if he has proved himself to be the finest knight in the world. Soon, a young man named Ipomadon, who is the son of Ermagynes (Hermogenes), King of Apulia, takes his tutor Talamewe (Ptolomy) with him to the lady's court, having already fallen in love with her from afar. She is known only as 'The Proud' but despite this formidable title, she treats Ipomadon kindly and soon falls in love with him. Ipomadon, however, displays more interest in hunting deer than in warfare and jousting, a fact that is not lost on the other noblemen at her court who begin to make fun of him. She tries to shame him into taking an interest in more manly pursuits, but her rebuke backfires and Ipomadon secretly leaves her court early the next morning with all his baggage. He has been known during his stay simply as the "straunge valete", or the 'strange or unknown young man', and the Proud realises to her horror that she knows nothing about him, neither his name nor where he is from, and so has little hope of ever finding him again.

That same day, Ipomadon is told that his mother is dying; he returns to Apulia and learns from her on her deathbed that he has a half-brother. Much later in the tale we learn that the name of this half-brother is Cabanus and there is a grand recognition scene between Ipomadon and his brother at the very end of the story. Cabanus is living at King Meleager's court in Sicily, who, you will remember, is the Proud's uncle, and, following his abrupt departure from this proud teenager's queenly court and a season of jousting in far-flung corners of Christendom, Ipomadon arrives in Sicily and to King Maleager's court, becoming known at once as the queen's favourite, perhaps even her lover. But he again becomes a figure of fun among the other noblemen for his (feigned) dislike of jousting in favour of hunting.

Meanwhile, the Proud has fallen into despondency and her noblemen, concerned that she must find a suitable husband, at last persuade her to agree to hold a tournament and to marry the knight who proves himself to be the strongest at the fighting. The tournament is announced, King Meleager's court hears of it and the king and queen of Sicily take Ipomadon with them to Calabria to take part in the jousting.

Whilst in Calabria, Ipomadon takes on a number of disguises. As far as the King of Sicily's queen is concerned, her darling, whom she loves, hunts all day and, to the derision of her ladies-in-waiting, brings back nothing more honourable in the evening than venison to give to the king, who is engaged in the tournament. In reality, however, Ipomadon has been fighting at the tournament all day, winning horses for himself, and it is his tutor Ptolomy who has been hunting. Ipomadon fights on the first day in white armour, having changed into it deep in the forest, and wins the acclaim of all. On the second day he fights in red armour and on the third day, in black. Every day he wins the prize and the Proud is devastated when the winning knight does not show up the next morning; particularly so since she learns from her cousin Jason every evening that the victorious knight has been none other than her 'strange or unknown young man'. Ipomadon has been careful to seek out this cousin every evening after the fighting to declare his identity. Well, not quite his complete identity. Having won the fighting on three successive days, Ipomadon leaves secretly again, leaving the Proud once again distraught at his departure.

Ipomadon travels the world, fighting in tournaments, becomes King of Apulia following his father's death, and hears one day that the Proud is being besieged in her city by a knight called Lyoline. This ugly knight is threatening to take her away with him to India. Ipomadon makes his way to King Maleager's court once again, just in time to witness the arrival of the Proud's messenger, begging for some assistance for her lady. But curiously, Ipomadon has chosen to arrive at King Maleager's court in such a way that he is not recognised, not even by the queen. He pretends to be a fool, and the reader (or listener) is treated to a comic scene in which the fool Ipomadon is first ridiculed and then accepted by the knights and noblemen, little knowing who he really is. Cabanus is conveniently absent from court on this occasion. The maiden who has been sent as a messenger by the Proud is mightily unimpressed that a fool should wish to take on the challenge, but since nobody else in the court seems at all inclined to offer their services, the king allows Ipomadon the fool to take it up.

Ipomadon follows the maiden and her dwarf, with the maiden hurling insults and telling him in no uncertain terms to go away, in much the same way as a maiden representing the imprisoned lady of Synadoun will do to the hero of Thomas Chestre's fourteenth century Middle English Arthurian romance Libeaus Desconus. At last, having defeated many hostile knights along the way, Ipomadon, the maiden and her dwarf arrive near the city where the Proud is being besieged. Lyoline is on horseback outside the city wall, shouting great boasts. Ipomadon removes himself to a forest nearby, while the maiden enters the city. Ipomadon sends his cousin out to discover what colour armour Lyoline is wearing. He is wearing black armour and is riding a black horse. Ipomadon dons black armour and rides out on a black horse, to challenge Lyoline to single combat for the hand of the Proud.

The battle is long and hard, goes on for hundreds of lines, but at last, Ipomadon is victorious. Lyoline lies dead at his feet. But now a very curious thing happens, and one that Hugh of Rhuddlan is happy to remain inexplicable, although the author of this Middle English tail-rhyme romance tries to convince us that it is through a lingering uncertainty on Ipomadon's part, a lack of certainty that he has truly accorded with the Proud's vow. Ipomadon goes to Lyoline's tent, takes up his banner and declares that Lyoline is victorious! Since their horses were slain from under them, we are told, nobody in the city has had any idea which knight is which:

"He [Ipomadon] wold no lengur byde,
To wallys gan he ryde
And cryed lowed on hight:
'Haue done and dight you, damysell,
Now may ye se yourself full well
That Lyolyne ys wyght!
Wete ye well I am hee;
Tomorowe into Yndde ye shall wyth me
For I haue slayne youre knight!'"

It is only with the arrival of Cabanus, who is intent upon rescuing the Proud himself, that Ipomadon is made to abandon this ludicrous disguise, to reveal his true self and to learn to his joy who Cabanus really is—his long lost brother. And on this joyful note, the romance ends with the Proud and her champion Ipomadon, her 'strange young man', at last in one another's arms.

== Late-medieval influences upon the Anglo-Norman Ipomedon ==
Ipomedon was written by Hugh of Rhuddlan in around 1180 or 1190. He states that he translated it out of a Latin manuscript, which is generally regarded as a hoax on his part. It was at one point believed to be inspired by a Byzantine source, but now appears to be an invented tale, but one nevertheless showing many motifs common to the romance genre.

=== Sir Lancelot ===
In the 1170s Chretien de Troyes wrote a romance called The Knight of the Cart in which an unknown knight, only much later revealed to be Sir Lancelot, travels into a land to which the only access is via a 'Sword Bridge' and an 'Underwater Bridge'. Near the end of this tale, having achieved the release of many people from King Arthur's court who had been held prisoner in this land, including Queen Guinevere, Lancelot attends a tournament in disguise, wearing a red shield. He is invincible but then, following secret instructions from Queen Guinevere, he behaves like an incompetent fool, then he as an invincible knight once again, before leaving the tournament without anybody except the queen knowing who it is.

Following his mother's death, Ipomadon travels widely, winning the prize at every tournament. But he wishes not to be known:

"Men covthe not calle hym there he came,
But 'the worthy knyghte that had no name'
In cuntres fere and nere."

Men had no choice but to call him 'the worthy knight who has no name', wherever he appeared.

Sir Lancelot, in the early-thirteenth century pre-cyclic Old French romance Lancelot, spends almost the entire length of the romance incognito, taking on a dozen or more knightly disguises before the end of the tale, in an effort not to be recognised. He even arrives at the royal court where his return should be welcomed, disguised as a fool; a court where there is a growing romantic attachment between himself and the queen, although she does not recognise him. In this case, of course, the queen is Guinevere.

One noticeable deviation from the courtly love presented in Lancelot's story is that Ipomadon and his beloved are united in marriage and have children, and even described as lovers after their marriage—a deviation from the original formulation of courtly love that grew common in romances of this era.

=== Tristan ===
Thomas of Britain's twelfth century romance Tristan, reworked into Middle High German by Gottfried von Strassburg, contains a lot of episodes where Tristan assumes a disguise, both before and after Isolde becomes the queen to King Mark of Cornwall, Tristan's uncle.

=== Folktale ===
The tournament where the hero fights in disguise and claims to have been busy is a fairy tale commonplace (such as in The Golden Crab or The Magician's Horse, or in Little Johnny Sheep-Dung and The Hairy Man, where it is actual battle), and from there passed into such romances as Robert the Devil, Sir Gowther, and Lanzelet. The episode is so closely related to the one in Lanzelet that it suggests that Hugh knew the French original of that romance, but it contains, in addition, that the knight won a bride by this, which suggests familiarity with a folktale with such a motif.

== Medieval English derivatives from the tale of Ipomedon ==
"The three different Middle English versions of the Anglo-Norman Ipomedon attest to the popularity of this text in England" and its influence can be seen in other works.

=== Thomas Chestre's tale of the Fair Unknown ===
Thomas Chestre wrote an Arthurian romance Lybeaus Desconus in the late-fourteenth century in which a young man arrives at King Arthur's court not knowing his own name, having been brought up in seclusion in the forest by his mother. Despite his inexperience at fighting, he asks, like the fool Ipomadon, that the first request to the king for a champion be given to him. King Arthur, like King Meleager, complies with this odd request, having named the young man the Fair Unknown. Soon afterwards, a maiden called Ellyne appears asking for a champion to defeat her mistress's enemies. Like Ipomadon, the Fair Unknown reminds the king of his promise, and to the consternation of the damsel and her dwarf, is allowed to set off with her. Only by proving himself in combat during the journey, like Ipomadon when he follows the angry maiden Imayne disguised as a fool, does the Fair Unknown stem the scorn, derision and verbal abuse heaped upon him by a far from happy maiden. Like Imayne too, Ellyne falls in love with her knight as he begins to prove himself in combat. At the end of the journey, of course, they both rescue their respective ladies.

=== Sir Gowther ===
In an anonymous fifteenth century Middle English romance called Sir Gowther, the eponymous anti-hero is given a penance by the Pope only to eat food that has been in the mouth of a dog. Sir Gowther eats under the table of a great lord in the guise of 'Hob tho fole' – Hob the fool – but when Saracens attack, the lowly Hob fights in the field on three successive days in black armour, red armour and finally in white armour, all miraculously provided for him. At the end of each day these arms mysteriously vanish away and no one knows who the invincible knight has been.

=== Roswall and Lillian ===
This Scottish romance, "certainly as early as the sixteenth century and perhaps [belonging] to the fifteenth", is found only in printed editions, the earliest dating to 1663. Unjustly robbed of his princely identity in a foreign land, Roswell becomes very friendly with the daughter of the king of that land. She, believing him to be of humble origins (and receiving not the slightest hint from him to the contrary), urges him to attend a tournament that has been arranged in order to find a suitable husband for her. On each of the three days of this tournament, Roswall, like Ipomadon, goes into the forest to hunt. On each occasion, however, he is approached by a knight in armour who exchanges his gear with the hero, so allowing Roswall to perform magnificently, though anonymously, at each day's jousting; first in white arms on a milk-white horse, then in red arms on a grey horse, and finally in green and red armour.

=== Sir Thomas Malory ===
"The influence of some version of Ipomadon" may also be traceable in the tale of Sir Gareth of Orkney, in Sir Thomas Malory's fifteenth century Arthurian epic Le Morte d'Arthur:

'Damesell,' seyde sir Beawmaynes, 'sey to me what ye woll, yet woll nat I go fro you whatsomever ye sey, for I have undirtake to kynge Arthure for to encheve your adventure, and so shall I fynyshe hit to the ende, other ellys I shall dye therefore.'

'Fy on the, kychyn knave!'
