= Robert W. Hanning =

- Awards: Guggenheim Fellowship (1972)

Academic background
- Education: Columbia University (BA, PhD); University of Oxford (BA)

Academic work
- Discipline: Medieval Literature
- Institutions: Bread Loaf School of English; Columbia University

Robert W. Hanning is an American medievalist. He is an emeritus professor of English and Comparative Literature at Columbia University.

== Biography ==
Hanning received his B.A. from Columbia University in 1958. He then received a Kellett Fellowship to study at the University of Oxford. Hanning obtained a PhD from Columbia University in 1964. From 1961 to 2004, Hanning taught English and comparative literature at Columbia. His scholarship focused on medieval English literature.

Hanning taught at the Bread Loaf School of English and directed the program at Lincoln College, Oxford in 1980, 1984, 1986.

Hanning received a Guggenheim Fellowship in 1972 as well as an ACLS, NEH, and Rockefeller Fellowship. He was elected a fellow of the Medieval Academy of America and a trustee of the New Chaucer Society.
