= John of Monmouth =

Anglo-Norman feudal lord of Breton ancestry

- Born: c 1182; Monmouth
- Died: 1248; Monmouth
- Occupation: nobleman
- Known for: Lord of Monmouth 1190-1248
- Spouses: Cecilia de Waleran; Agnes de Musgros
- Children: 4
- Father: Gilbert fitzBaderon

John of Monmouth (c. 1182 – 1248) was an Anglo-Norman feudal lord of Breton ancestry, who was lord of Monmouth between 1190 and 1248. He was a favourite of both King John and his son, Henry III, and one of the most powerful royal allies in the Welsh Marches.

== Life ==
He was born in Monmouth, the son of Gilbert fitzBaderon, and the great-grandson of William fitzBaderon who had been lord of Monmouth at the time of the Domesday Book in 1086. John's father died in about 1189, and, being under age, he was made the ward of his uncle, William de Braose, 4th Lord of Bramber, Sheriff of Herefordshire and a court favourite. He was still a ward of de Braose at the time of King John's accession to the throne of England in 1199, but, by 1201, he had married Cecilia de Waleran and paid the king 120 marks and two Norway hawks for his share of her father's property. Like William de Braose, he had a close relationship with the king, who visited Monmouth in 1213 on a hunting expedition. When the king died in 1216, John of Monmouth was present at his bedside, and was one of the executors of his will. He was also involved in the coronation of John's son and successor, Henry III.

He was appointed as Constable of St Briavels, and as a Justice in Eyre with responsibility for the law in royal forests. He became one of the most powerful figures in the southern Marches, serving as an advisor to the king on Anglo-Welsh affairs. In 1226, he established the Abbey of Grace Dieu, a few miles outside Monmouth, but the abbey faced constant attacks from the Welsh who claimed that John had seized Welsh land unlawfully; it was forced to relocate several times. John was also one of King Henry's allies in fighting the rebellions by the Welsh prince Llywelyn ab Iorwerth and Richard Marshal, Earl of Pembroke. However, he reportedly fled the Battle of Monmouth in 1233, when Richard Marshal's forces defeated the defenders of the town led by Baldwin III, Count of Guînes, and thereafter devastated the surrounding countryside. John returned to Monmouth afterwards, and over the next few years increased the extent of his control. He was made chief bailiff of South Wales in 1242, and at one point had control of Chepstow, Usk, Caerleon, Carmarthen, Builth and Cardigan as well as Monmouth.

== Marriages and issue ==
John's first marriage, in 1201, was to Cecily, the daughter of Walter de Waleran (c. 1143–1200), of Shaftesbury, Dorset. They had three daughters and a son, William. Cecily died in 1222. His second marriage, in about 1223/24, was to Agnes, the daughter of Walter de Muscegros. They had three sons: John, who became lord of Monmouth upon his father's death, Walter and Richard.

== Death and aftermath ==
He died in 1247 or 1248, and was buried at Monmouth. His tomb was destroyed in the rebuilding of the Priory Church of St Mary in 1737.

His son John, who had been born in about 1225, fell heavily into debt and surrendered his estates, including the lordship of Monmouth, to the crown in 1256. He died in 1274.

== See also ==
- John of Monmouth (died 1257)
