= Hugh de Lacy, Lord of Meath =

Anglo-Norman landowner and official (d. 1186)

Hugh de Lacy 4th Baron de Lacy
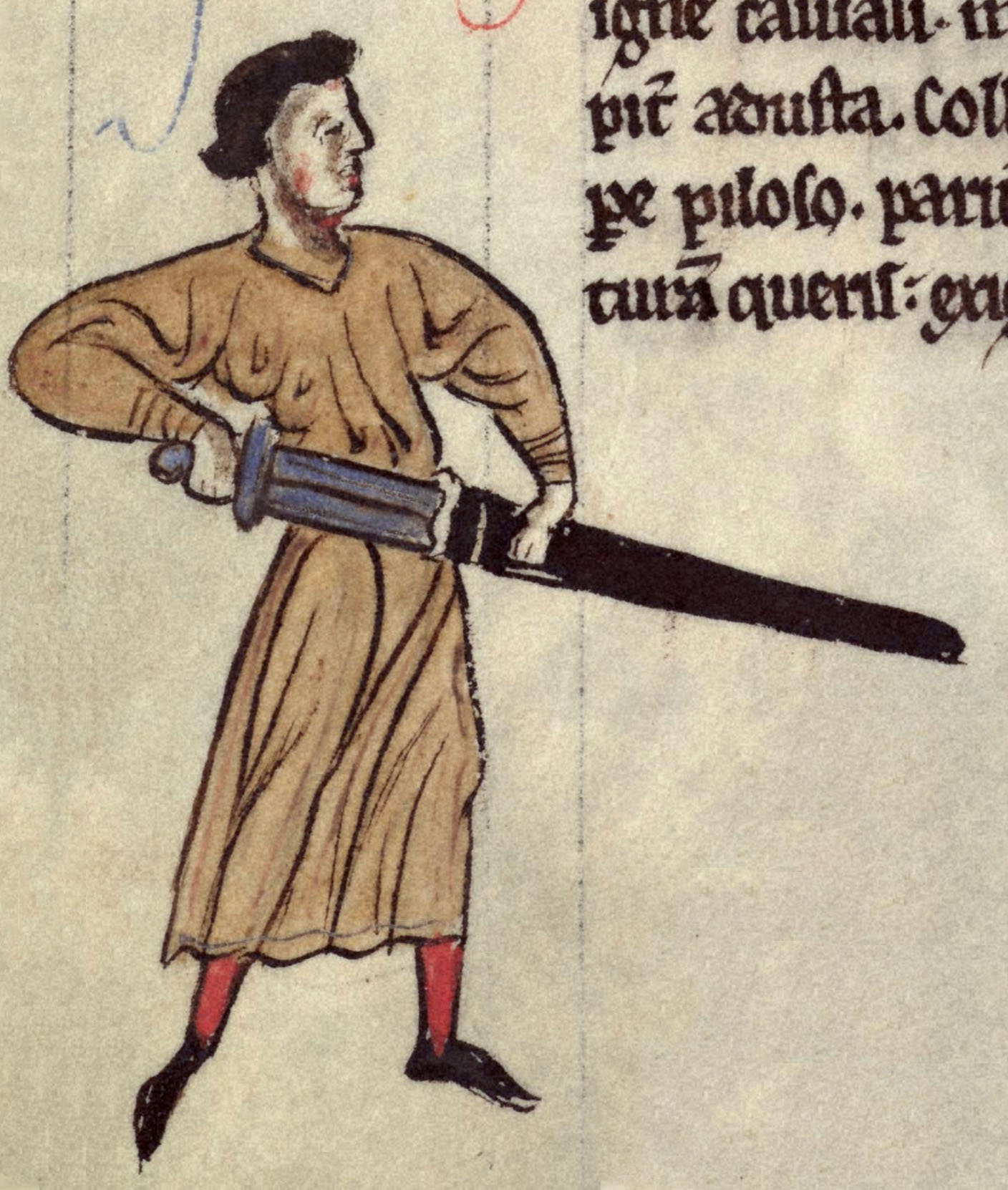
- Drawing of de Lacy by Gerald of Wales

1st Viceroy of Ireland
- In office 1172–1173
- Monarch: Henry II
- Succeeded by: William FitzAldelm
- In office 1177–1181
- Preceded by: William FitzAldelm
- Succeeded by: John fitz Richard

1st Lord of Meath
- In office March 1172 – 25 July 1186
- Succeeded by: Walter de Lacy

Personal details
- Born: before 1135 Herefordshire, England
- Died: 25 July 1186 Durrow, Ireland
- Spouse(s): Rohese of Monmouth (d. before 1180); Róis Ní Chonchobair
- Children: 10, including Walter and Hugh
- Parent(s): Gilbert de Lacy; Agnes de Lacy

Hugh de Lacy, Lord of Meath, 4th Baron Lacy (Anglo-Norman: Huge de Laci; before 1135 – 25 July 1186), was an Anglo-Norman landowner and royal office-holder. He had substantial land holdings in Herefordshire and Shropshire. Following his participation in the Anglo-Norman invasion of Ireland, he was granted, in 1172, the lands of the Kingdom of Meath by the Anglo-Norman King Henry II, but he had to gain control of them. The Lordship of Meath was then the most extensive liberty in Ireland.

== Early life ==
Hugh de Lacy was the son of Gilbert de Lacy (died after 1163) of Ewyas Lacy, Weobley, and Ludlow. He is said to have had a dispute with Josce de Dinan as to certain lands in Herefordshire in 1154. He was in possession of his father's lands before 1163, and in 1165–66 held fifty-eight and three-quarters knight's fees, and had nine tenants without knight service.

== Career in Ireland ==
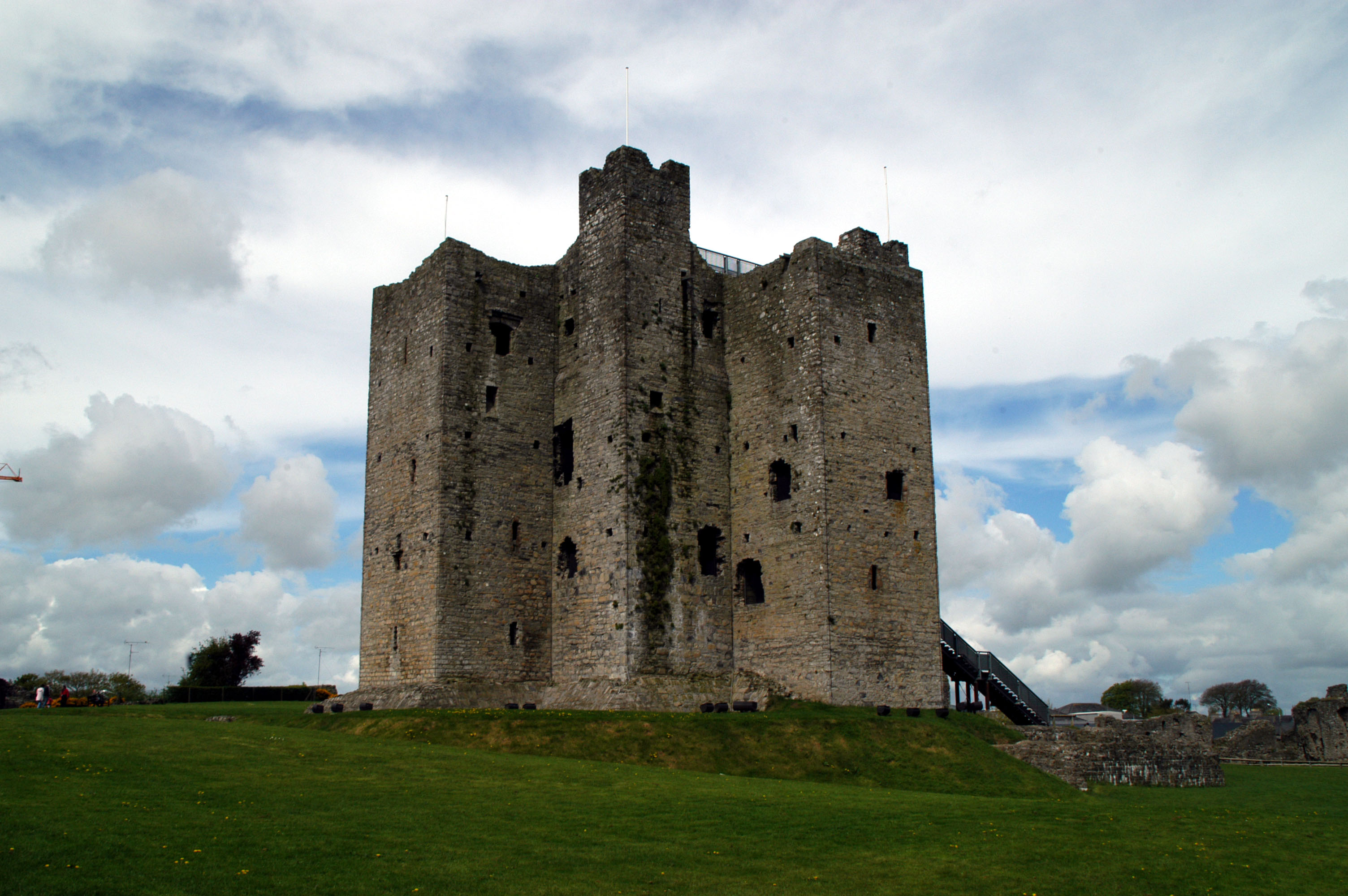
The keep of Trim Castle

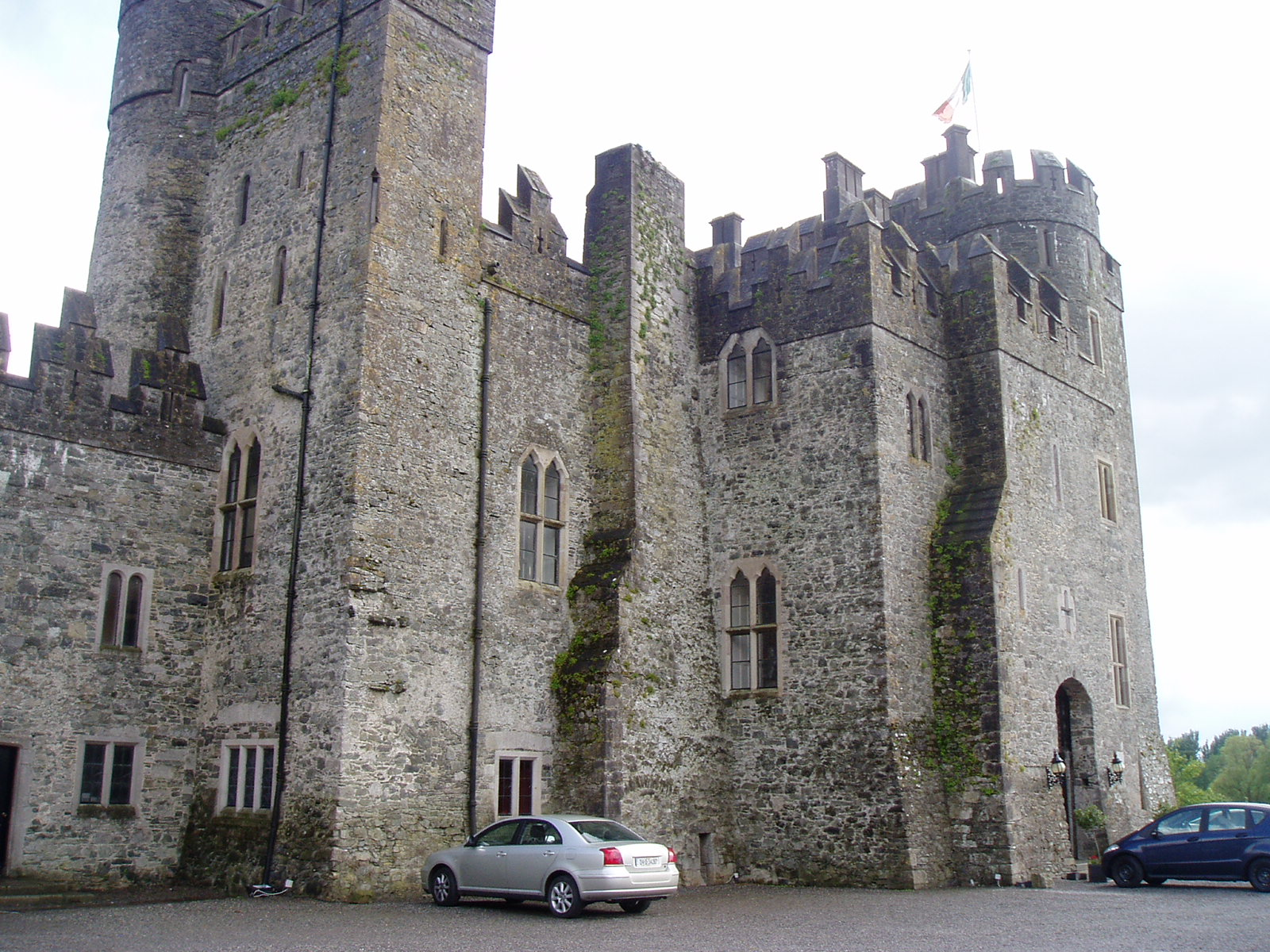
Kilkea Castle (Front)

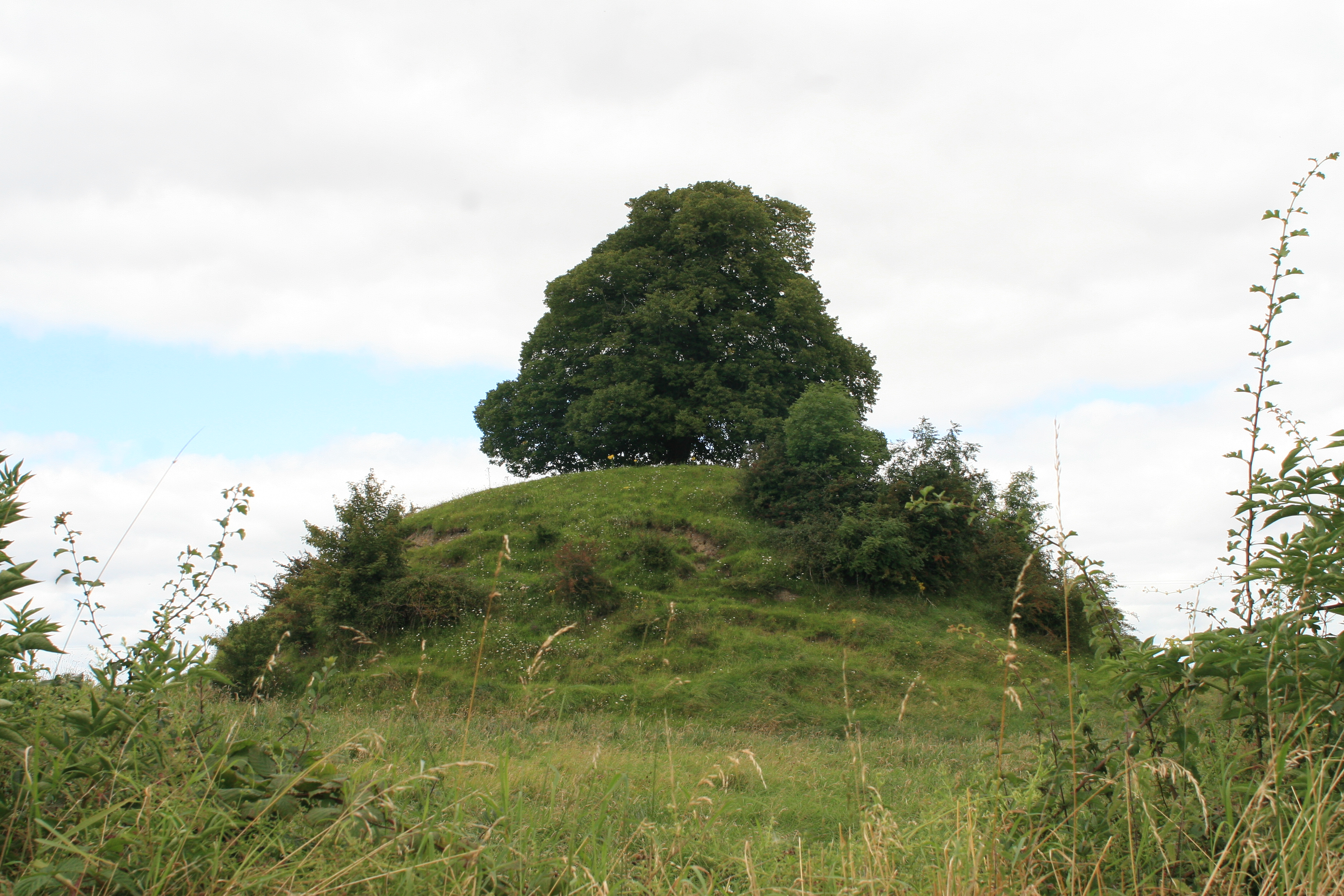
Motte-and-bailey built by de Lacy at Clonard, County Meath

In October 1171 Lacy went over with Henry II as part of an Anglo-Norman force to invade Ireland, and early in 1172 he was sent to receive the submission of Rory, High King of Ireland. Before Henry's return to England about the end of March 1172, Lacy was granted Meath by the service of fifty knights and with almost royal authority; he was also put in charge of Dublin Castle. As such, it is generally accepted that Lacy was de facto the first Viceroy of Ireland, a position he was to hold three times (in 1172, 1179, and c. 1180), the third time jointly with the Bishop of Salisbury.

King Henry's ostensible grant of Meath to Lacy was not accepted by Tighearnán Ó Ruairc, King of Bréifne, who ruled it at that time. Ó Ruairc refused to concede, but parleyed with Lacy on the Hill of Ward, in Meath. After negotiations stalled, a dispute ensued in which an interpreter was killed by a blow aimed at Lacy, who fled; Ó Ruairc was killed by a spear-thrust as he mounted his horse, and he was decapitated. His head was impaled over the gate of Dublin Castle and was later sent to Henry II. The Annals of the Four Masters say that Ó Ruairc was treacherously slain. From the account given by Gerald of Wales, it would appear that there was a plot to destroy Ó Ruairc.

Gerald of Wales also related the following legend of Féchín and Hugh de Lacy:

" Chapter LII" (Of the mill which no women enter)

- "There is a mill at Foure, in Meath, which St. Fechin made most miraculously with his own hands, in the side of a certain rock. No women are allowed to enter either this mill or the church of the saint; and the mill is held in as much reverence by the natives as any of the churches dedicated to the saint. It happened that when Hugh de Lacy was leading his troops through this place, an archer dragged a girl into the mill and there violated her. Sudden punishment overtook him; for being struck with infernal fire in the offending parts, it spread throughout his whole body, and he died the same night".

== Lordship of Meath ==
Lacy only escaped from Dublin with difficulty; he seems to have left the city in the charge of Richard de Clare by the king's orders, and to have commenced securing Meath by the construction of castles. Among these was Trim Castle, which was put in charge of Hugh Tyrrel. The Song of Dermot and the Earl states, "And Skryne he then gave by charter to Adam de Feypo he gave it", and he built his castle there.

After this Lacy went back to England. On 29 December 1172 he was at Canterbury, where, according to a story preserved by Giraldus, he reproved Archbishop Richard of Dover for his boastful language. Next year he was fighting for King Henry in France and held Verneuil against Louis VII for a month; but at the end of that time, the town was forced to capitulate.

Lacy was sent back to Ireland as procurator-general in 1177, soon after the death of Richard de Clare. The grant of Meath to Lacy was now confirmed, with the additions of Offaly, Kildare, and Wicklow.

As governor of Ireland Lacy secured Leinster and Meath, building numerous castles, while leaving the Irish in possession of their lands. There were accusations that he intended to seize the sovereignty of the island for himself. The author of the Gesta Henrici, however, says that Lacy lost his favour with Henry in consequence of complaints of his injustice by the Irish.

In 1181, Lacy was recalled from his royal post for having married Róis Ní Chonchobair, the daughter of Ruaidrí Ua Conchobair, King of Connacht and deposed High King of Ireland, without the permission of Henry. He was sent back the following winter, although with a co-adjutor, Robert of Shrewsbury, one of the royal clerks. Early in 1185, Henry sent his son John over to Ireland, who complained to his father that Lacy would not permit the Irish to pay tribute. This led to renewed disapproval, but Lacy remained in Ireland and occupied himself as before with castle-building.

== Death, aftermath and legacy ==
In 1186 Hugh de Lacy was killed by Gilla-Gan-Mathiar O'Maidhaigh, while he was supervising the construction of a Motte castle at Durrow at the instigation of An tSionnach and O'Breen (O'Briain). Prince John was promptly sent over to Ireland to take possession of his lands.

Lacy's body was initially buried at Durrow Abbey. In 1195, the Archbishops of Cashel and Dublin disinterred his body and reinterred his remains at Bective Abbey in Meath and his head in St Thomas's Abbey, Dublin. A long controversy was then carried on between the two abbeys for his body, settled only in 1205 when it was disinterred again and reburied in St Thomas's Abbey, in the tomb of Lacy's first wife.

Lacy was a benefactor of Llanthony Priory and also of many churches in Ireland, including the abbey of Trim.

== Marriage and issue ==
Hugh de Lacy was married twice.

Before 1155 Hugh married Rohese of Monmouth (also known as Rose of Monmouth or Roysya de Monemue). She was the granddaughter of Gilbert Fitz Richard. Strongbow was another grandchild of Fitz Richard. Hugh and Rohese had at least 8 children, 4 sons and 4 daughters:

- Walter de Lacy (1166–1241)
- Hugh de Lacy, 1st Earl of Ulster (bef.1179–1242)
- Gilbert de Lacy
- Robert de Lacy (died young)
- Elayne (Elena) de Lacy, who married Richard de Beaufo (Belfou)
- Alice de Lacy, who married Roger Pipard, then married Geoffrey de Marisco, Justiciar of Ireland, son of Jordan de Marisco, Justiciar of Ireland.
- a daughter, given name unknown, who married Sir William FitzAlan, son of Sir William FitzAlan, Lord of Oswestry, and his first wife Christiana.

Rohese died before 1180.

Hugh married secondly Princess Rose Ní Conchobair, daughter of King of Ireland, Ruaidrí Ua Conchobair.
They had at least 2 children, a son and a daughter:

- William Gorm de Lacy (declared illegitimate by Henry II of England)
- Ysota de Lacy

== Ancestry ==
Ancestors of Hugh de Lacy, Lord of Meath

Hugh, Lord of Lassy, Normandy
Walter de Lacy
Roger de Lacy
Gilbert de Lacy
Hugh de Lacy, Lord of Meath
Agnes

Political offices
New title	Lord High Constable of Ireland ?–1186	Succeeded by Walter de Lacy, Lord of Meath
