= Gilbert Fitz Richard =

Anglo-Norman baron in Wales (1066–1117)

- 2nd feudal baron of Clare; 2nd Lord of Tonbridge; Lord of Cardigan

Hereditary
- Lord of the Honor of Clare: 1090–1117
- Predecessor: Richard fitz Gilbert
- Successor: Richard Fitz Gilbert de Clare
- Born: 1066; Clare, Suffolk, England
- Died: 1117 (aged 50–51)
- Buried: Tonbridge Priory
- Family: de Clare
- Spouse: Adeliza de Clermont
- Issue: Walter de Clare; Adelize de Clare; Margaret de Clare; Richard Fitz Gilbert de Clare; Hervey de Clare; Gilbert Fitz Gilbert de Clare; Baldwin Fitz Gilbert de Clare, Lord of Bourne; Rohese de Clare
- Father: Richard fitz Gilbert
- Mother: Rohese Giffard
- Occupation: Peerage of England

Gilbert Fitz Richard (c. 1066–c. 1117), 2nd feudal baron of Clare in Suffolk, and styled "de Tonbridge", was a powerful Anglo-Norman baron who was granted the Lordship of Cardigan, in Wales c. 1107–1111.

== Life ==
Gilbert, born before 1066, was the second son and an heir of Richard Fitz Gilbert of Clare and Rohese Giffard. He succeeded to his father's possessions in England in 1088 when his father retired to a monastery; his brother, Roger Fitz Richard, inherited his father's lands in Normandy. That same year he, along with his brother Roger, fortified his castle at Tonbridge against the forces of William Rufus. But his castle was stormed, Gilbert was wounded and taken prisoner. However he and his brother were in attendance on king William Rufus at his death in August 1100. He was with Henry I at his Christmas court at Westminster in 1101.

It has been hinted, by modern historians, that Gilbert, as a part of a baronial conspiracy, played some part in the suspicious death of William II. Frank Barlow points out that no proof has been found he had any part in the king's death or that a conspiracy even existed.

In 1110, King Henry I took Cardigan from Owain ap Cadwgan, son of Cadwgan ap Bleddyn as punishment for a number of crimes including that of the abduction of Nest, wife of Gerald de Windsor. In turn Henry gave the Lordship of Cardigan, including Cardigan Castle to Gilbert Fitz Richard. He founded the Clunic priory at Stoke-by-Clare, Suffolk. Gilbert died in or before 1117.

== Family ==
About 1088, Gilbert married Adeliza/Alice de Clermont, daughter of Hugh, Count of Clermont, and Margaret de Ramerupt. Gilbert and Adeliza had at least eight children:

- Richard Fitz Gilbert de Clare, d. 1136.
- Gilbert Fitz Gilbert de Clare, d. 1148, 1st Earl of Pembroke.
- Baldwin Fitz Gilbert de Clare, d. 1154, m. Adeline de Rollos.
- Adelize/Alice de Clare, d. 1163, m. (ca. 1105), Aubrey II de Vere, son of Aubrey I de Vere and Beatrice. She had 9 children and in her widowhood was a corrodian at St. Osyth's, Chich, Essex.
- Hervey de Clare, Lord of Montmorency.
- Walter de Clare, d. 1149.
- Margaret de Clare, d. 1185, m. (ca. 1108), Sir William de Montfitchet, Lord of Stansted Mountfitchet.
- Rohese de Clare, d. 1149, m. (ca. 1130), Baderon of Monmouth
