= Hugh de Lacy, 1st Earl of Ulster =

Anglo-Norman soldier and peer (d. 1242)

Coat of arms of Hugh de Lacy, Or, a lion rampant purpure

Arms of Hugh de Lacy, 1st Earl of Ulster, as recorded by Matthew Paris: Vert, a bordure or

Hugh de Lacy, 1st Earl of Ulster (c. 1176 – after 26 December 1242) was an Anglo-Norman soldier and peer. He was a leading figure in the Norman invasion of Ireland in the 12th century, and was created Earl of Ulster in 1204 by King John of England.

De Lacy was the younger son of Hugh de Lacy, Lord of Meath, a descendant of Walter de Lacy, who went to England after the Norman conquest. Around 1189, he was appointed Viceroy of Ireland, a position previously held by his father. He was replaced in 1190 by Guillaume la Petil. He was later reappointed to serve as viceroy from 1205 to 1210.

== Carlow motte and bailey ==
He erected a motte in the 1180s in Carlow, on the site of which Carlow Castle was built in the 13th century. When Carlow Castle was excavated in 1996, a series of post-holes was found to lie under the walls of the towered keep, indicating that they pre-dated the keep.

== Capture of John de Courcy and Earldom of Ulster ==
De Lacy was for a time a coadjutor with John de Courcy in Leinster and Munster. In 1181, de Courcy was created Earl of Ulster by patent from King Henry II. Later, he was also created Lord of Connaught, becoming a rival of the De Lacys. De Courcy began aggressively seizing more land in Ireland without permission, drawing the ire of King John. Hugh de Lacy accused de Courcy of neglecting to pay homage to John. The king sent a letter to the feudal barons of Ulster — allies of de Courcy – informing them that if they did not convince their lord to pay proper homage, all their land would be seized. In 1203, Hugh de Lacy, along with a contingent of English soldiers, marched on Ulaid and expelled de Courcy. In 1204, his lands and title were forfeited, and de Lacy was created the Earl of Ulster with the transfer of de Courcy's rights.

Hugh continued the conquest of the north-eastern over-kingdom of Ulaid, building on de Courcy's success, with the earldom spanning across the modern counties of Antrim and Down and parts of Londonderry. He tried, without much success, to reduce the O'Neill of Tyrone to submission. In 1207, war broke out between Hugh de Lacy and Meiler Fitzhenry, the Lord Chief Justice of Ireland.

In 1208, William de Braose, 4th Lord of Bramber in England, fell out of favour with King John and fled to Ireland where he took refuge with Hugh's brother Walter de Lacy, Lord of Meath, who was married to his daughter Margaret de Braose. Enraged, John raised an army to bring to Ireland to punish Walter de Lacy, take de Lacy lands, and capture de Braose. John's force landed in Waterford in 1210 and marched north. Walter de Lacy quickly submitted, but Hugh resisted and was defeated. He fled to Scotland. Exiled by King John, Hugh took part in the Albigensian Crusade for 13 years.

On his return to Ireland in 1223, he allied himself with O'Neill against the English. He invaded Ulster and besieged Carrickfergus but was forced to surrender to William Marshal, 2nd Earl of Pembroke, who had been sent to Ireland to put down the rebellion. In 1226, his lands in Ulster were handed over to his brother Walter de Lacy by King Henry III, but were restored to him in the following year, after which he appears to have loyally served the king, being more than once summoned to England to give advice about Irish affairs. He died at Carrickfergus in 1242 or 1243.

== Family ==
De Lacy married first Lescaline, daughter of Bertram de Verdun; secondly, Emeline, daughter of Walter de Ridlesford. He had at least two sons, Walter and Roger, both of whom predeceased him. Although he had several daughters his earldom of Ulster reverted to the crown after his death. In 1263, Edward I granted the earldom to Hugh de Lacy's great-nephew, Walter de Burgh, grandson of Walter de Lacy of Meath.
