= Putley =

Village in Herefordshire, England

Coordinates: 52.033644°N 2.523336°W

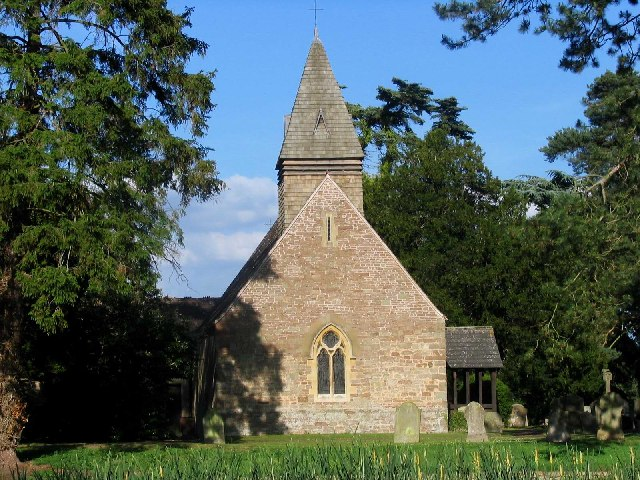

- Location within Herefordshire
- Area: 4.4868 km^{2} (1.7324 sq mi)
- Population: 245 (2011 census)
  - Density: 55/km^{2} (140/sq mi)
- OS grid reference: SO642374
- Civil parish: Putley
- Unitary authority: County of Herefordshire
- Ceremonial county: Herefordshire
- Region: West Midlands
- Country: England
- Sovereign state: United Kingdom
- Post town: Ledbury
- Postcode district: HR8
- Police: West Mercia
- Fire: Hereford and Worcester
- Ambulance: West Midlands
- UK Parliament: North Herefordshire
- Website: www.putley.org.uk

Putley is a village and civil parish 8 miles (13 km) east of Hereford, in the county of Herefordshire, England. In 2011 the parish had a population of 245. The parish borders Aylton, Woolhope, Pixley, Much Marcle and Tarrington.

== Features ==
There are 49 listed buildings in Putley. Putley has a parish hall and a church. Putley also possibly had a castle called Putley Castle.

== History ==
The name "Putley" means 'Putta's wood/clearing' or 'hawk wood/clearing'. Putley was recorded in the Domesday Book as Poteslepe. Pulley is also recorded as a name for "Putley". On the 25th of March 1885 two cottages at Mainswood Houses, a part of Ashperton parish, Bull's Grove and Hazle Farms Houses, a part of Munsley parish and Hatsford, &c Houses, a part of Woolhope parish was transferred to the parish, a part near Beans Bulls was transferred to Woolhope parish.

In October 2026 the Archbishop of Canterbury went to Putley church for a harvest service.
