= Hawise of Monmouth =

- Years active: early 12th century
- Known for: First woman resident of Monmouth whose name is recorded
- Spouse: William fitzBaderon
- Children: Baderon of Monmouth; Two daughters: Iveta and Advenia

Hawise or Hadewis of Monmouth (lived early 12th century), is the first woman resident of Monmouth whose name is recorded in the written record.

Hawise's origin and parentage are unknown. She was the wife of William fitzBaderon, (d. before 1144) who held Monmouth, Wales and lived in Monmouth Castle from the year 1082 on the orders of King William I of England. Monmouth was previously held by William's paternal uncle, Withenoc, Lord of Monmouth, between 1075 and 1082. Withenoc was of Breton origin, never married and had no heirs. He retired from his military responsibilities to become a monk, having been responsible for the founding of Monmouth Priory. Hawise and her family would continue to support the priory.

Hawise and William fitzBaderon had at least two daughters and one son, Iveta (also recorded as Juveta/Judith), Advenia and Baderon. A second son, Richard Walensis has also been suggested. Either Iveta or Advenia married a member of the de Cormeilles family. The children of this marriage, grandsons to Hawise and William, were Richard, Robert and Alexander de Cormeilles. Baderon fitzWilliam was their son and heir. He was his father's successor as lord of Monmouth and held the lordship until about 1170/1176.

In 1101, when William presented the newly completed St Mary's Priory Church and the attached Monmouth Priory to the parent Abbey of Saint-Florent de Saumur, along with the revenues of several local churches, the donation was formally confirmed by Hawise, Iveta and Advenia. On 18 March 1101 or 1102 the Priory Church was consecrated by Hervey le Breton, bishop of Bangor, in the presence of abbot William of Saint-Florent de Saumur and of Bernard, King Henry I's chaplain. On this occasion Hawise and her two daughters made crosses that were used in the ceremonial proceedings.
