= William fitzBaderon =

Anglo-Norman nobleman

- Born: c 1060/65? possibly La Boussac, Brittany
- Died: between 1125 and 1138 unknown
- Occupation: nobleman
- Known for: Lord of Monmouth c.1082-1125
- Spouse: Hawise of Monmouth
- Children: Baderon of Monmouth

William fitzBaderon (c. 1060/65? – before 1138) was an Anglo-Norman nobleman of Breton descent, who was lord of Monmouth between about 1082 and 1125. He was mentioned in the Domesday Book as being responsible for Monmouth Castle and ten other manors in the surrounding region, and was responsible in 1101 for the consecration of the town's Priory which had been established in 1075 by his uncle Withenoc.

== Life ==
He was the son of Baderon, a nobleman of La Boussac, near Dol in Brittany. Baderon was the son of Caradoc de la Boussac, a nobleman with estates near Dol in Brittany. Baderon's brother Withenoc (or Gwithenoc) was appointed lord of Monmouth by King William after the disgrace of Roger de Breteuil in 1075, and founded the Priory at Monmouth. The pious Withenoc then gave up his secular responsibilities in about 1082 to become a monk at Saumur, and, because his own son Raterius and his brother Baderon were also monks, the responsibilities fell on Baderon's son, William. Withenoc's responsibilities initially passed for a short time to Ranulf de Colville, perhaps because William had not yet reached adulthood.

In any event, by the time of the Domesday Book in 1086, William had become a major landowner. Besides his castle at Monmouth, he was also lord of Huntley, Longhope, Ruardean, and Siddington, in Gloucestershire; and of Ashperton, Hope Mansell, Munsley, Stretton Grandison, Walsopthorne and Whitwick, in Herefordshire. At Monmouth, he may have been responsible for completing the rebuilding of the original wooden motte and bailey castle in stone.

He and his family, together with his vassals, their wives, and Withenoc, were present when Monmouth Priory was consecrated in 1101. William was of sufficient eminence to attract to the ceremony such notables as King Henry's chaplain, Bernard. William granted, to the abbey of Saint Florent at Saumur, the Priory Church of St Mary at Monmouth, "and all their churches, and the tithes of all their lands and of all their tenants, namely, of grain, of stock, of honey, of iron, of mills, of cheeses, and of whatever is tithed. They also gave, near the castle of Monemuda (Monmouth) the land of three ploughs and the mill of Milebroc (?), and a meadow at Blakenalre (?), and land at St. Cadoc (Llangattock-Vibon-Avel), and a meadow beneath their castle, and a virgate of land, namely, Godric's, and at Siddington a hide of land, and in all their woods pannage for swine of the monks' demesne. They also gave all wood required by the monks or their men for building. Lastly, [he] granted seven burgesses in their market-place, free from all toll and from all dues, save offences deserving corporal penalty."

William married Hawise (or Hadwise), and was succeeded as lord of Monmouth by his eldest son, Baderon fitzWilliam of Monmouth, in about 1125. It is not known whether he died at that time, or retreated to a monastic life.
