= Monmouth Cemetery =

Municipal cemetery in Monmouth, Wales

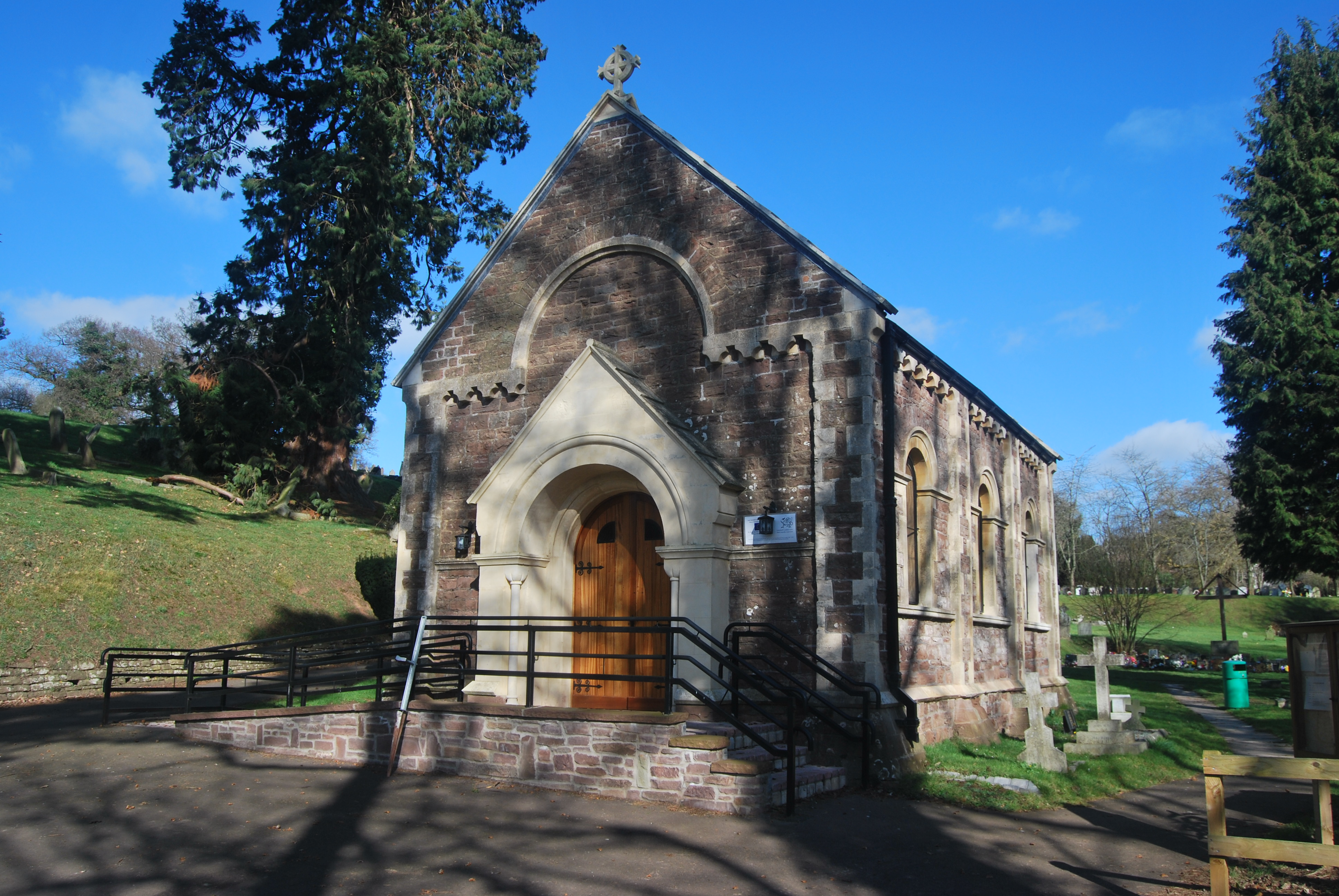
- The former chapel of rest, 1851
- Interactive map of Monmouth Cemetery

Details
- Established: 1 December 1851
- Location: Osbaston Road, Monmouth
- Country: Wales
- Coordinates: 51.8196°N 2.7150°W
- Owned by: Monmouthshire Council
- Size: 7 acres (2.8 ha)

Monmouth Cemetery is a cemetery situated on Osbaston Road in Monmouth, Wales. It was open for burials from 1852 until 2012.

== History ==
Monmouth Cemetery was opened on 1 December 1851. The ground was consecrated on 23 June 1852 by the Bishop of Llandaff, together with the vicar of Monmouth, the Reverend E. F. Arney. The first burial took place on 25 June 1852. The first cremated ashes to be interred, in February 1930, were those of the Reverend Kean Mottram Pitt, who had died aged 70 on the Isle of Wight; they were placed in the grave of his parents.

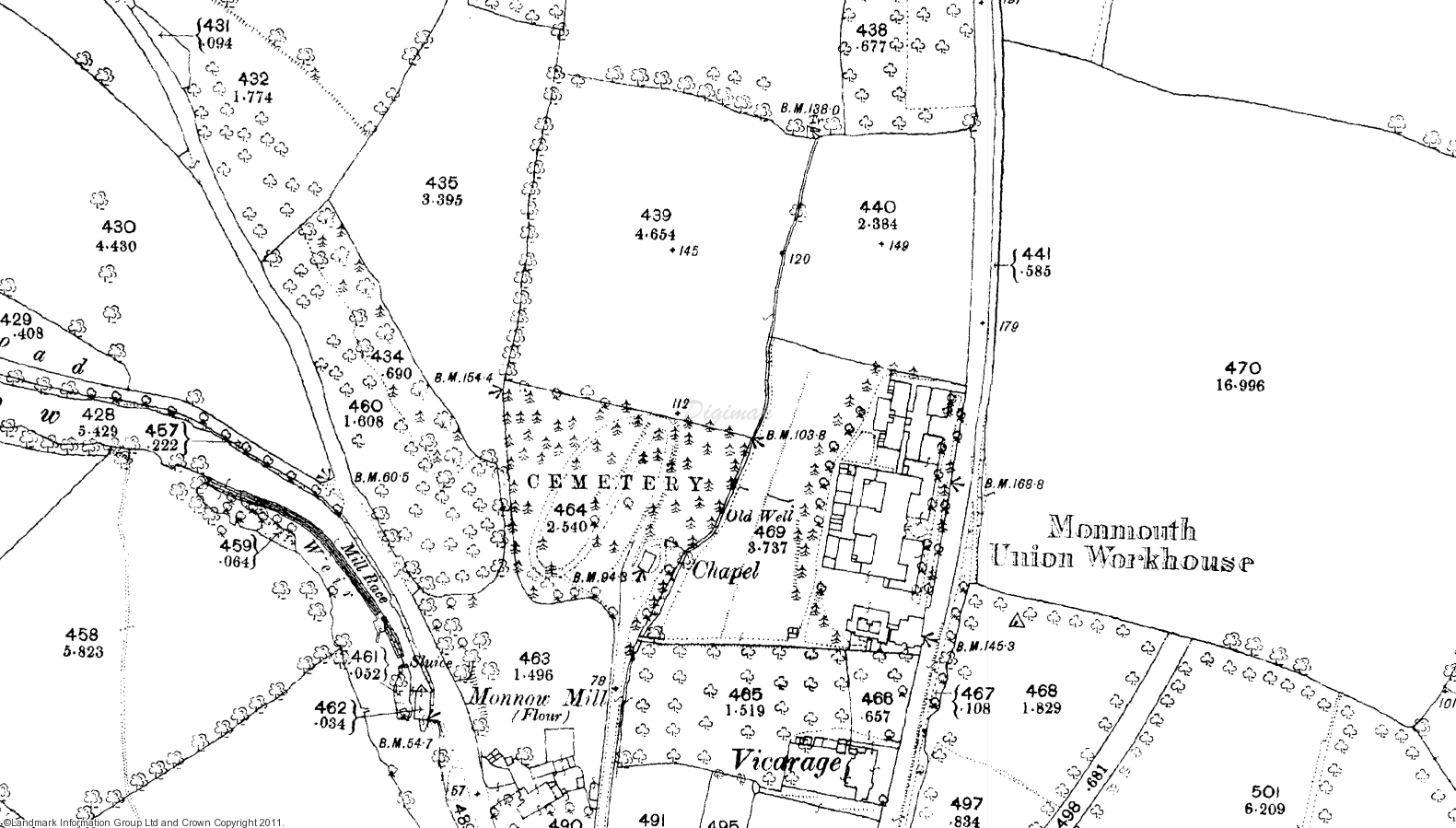
Map of Monmouth Cemetery, 1880

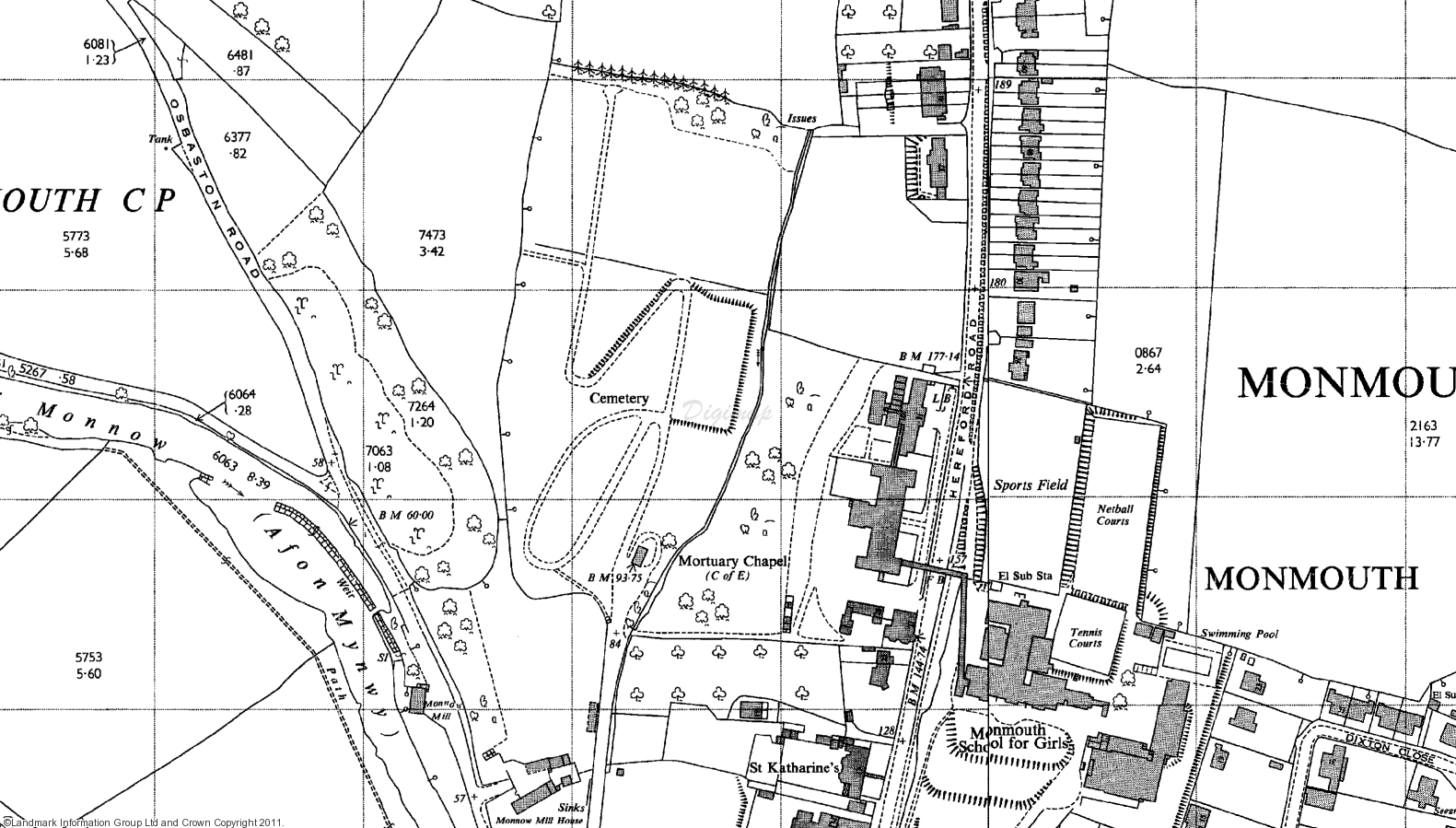
Map of Monmouth Cemetery, 1960, showing the expansion into the field to the north

The cemetery was established after Monmouth Council resolved to close St Mary's Churchyard to further burials, on the grounds that decaying human remains were emerging above the surface. This had been caused by the raised level of the churchyard. Residents of neighbouring Whitecross Street suffered a high mortality rate as a consequence, and unpleasant odours from the churchyard were also evident.

Henry Somerset, 7th Duke of Beaufort, sold the land to the council for use as the new cemetery. The cemetery has been enlarged several times and now covers approximately 7 acres (2.8 ha). Monmouth Union Workhouse (opened 1870) and Haberdashers' Monmouth School for Girls (1897) stand nearby. Owing to its proximity to the workhouse, an area of the cemetery, now used for cremated remains, was set aside for the burial of paupers. These paupers' graves are mostly unmarked; however, in 1909 a hooded wooden cross was set in a stone base and unveiled. It bears a Latin inscription, Ave Crux Spes Unica, meaning "Hail, O Cross, Our Only Hope". The site is now owned and maintained by Monmouthshire County Council.

There is a small former chapel of rest at the cemetery, designed by the Reverend M. Wyatt and built by Charles Jackson in 1851. It was closed to the public around 1969, but was restored in 2010 and, following a celebratory opening on 26 June of that year, now serves as a genealogy centre.

The cemetery is accessible at all times, with open access and parking. Its hillside position means that some of its paths are rather steep. In 2012, the cemetery was closed to new burials owing to a lack of space.

== Facilities ==
- Three water points, situated at intervals along the path network
- Limited parking at the chapel, midway up the cemetery, and at the top

== Notable interments ==
- William Wilson Allen VC (1843–1890), veteran of the Battle of Rorke's Drift; died of influenza on 12 March 1890
- Mary Ellen Bagnall Oakeley (1834–1904), local artist and antiquarian
- Dr Alfred Edwin Monahan (1877–1945), third Bishop of Monmouth; died 10 August 1945
- The Commonwealth War Graves Commission maintains and registers the war graves of eight British service personnel of the First World War (seven of whom were soldiers of the Royal Monmouthshire Royal Engineers) and six of the Second World War.

== Gallery ==
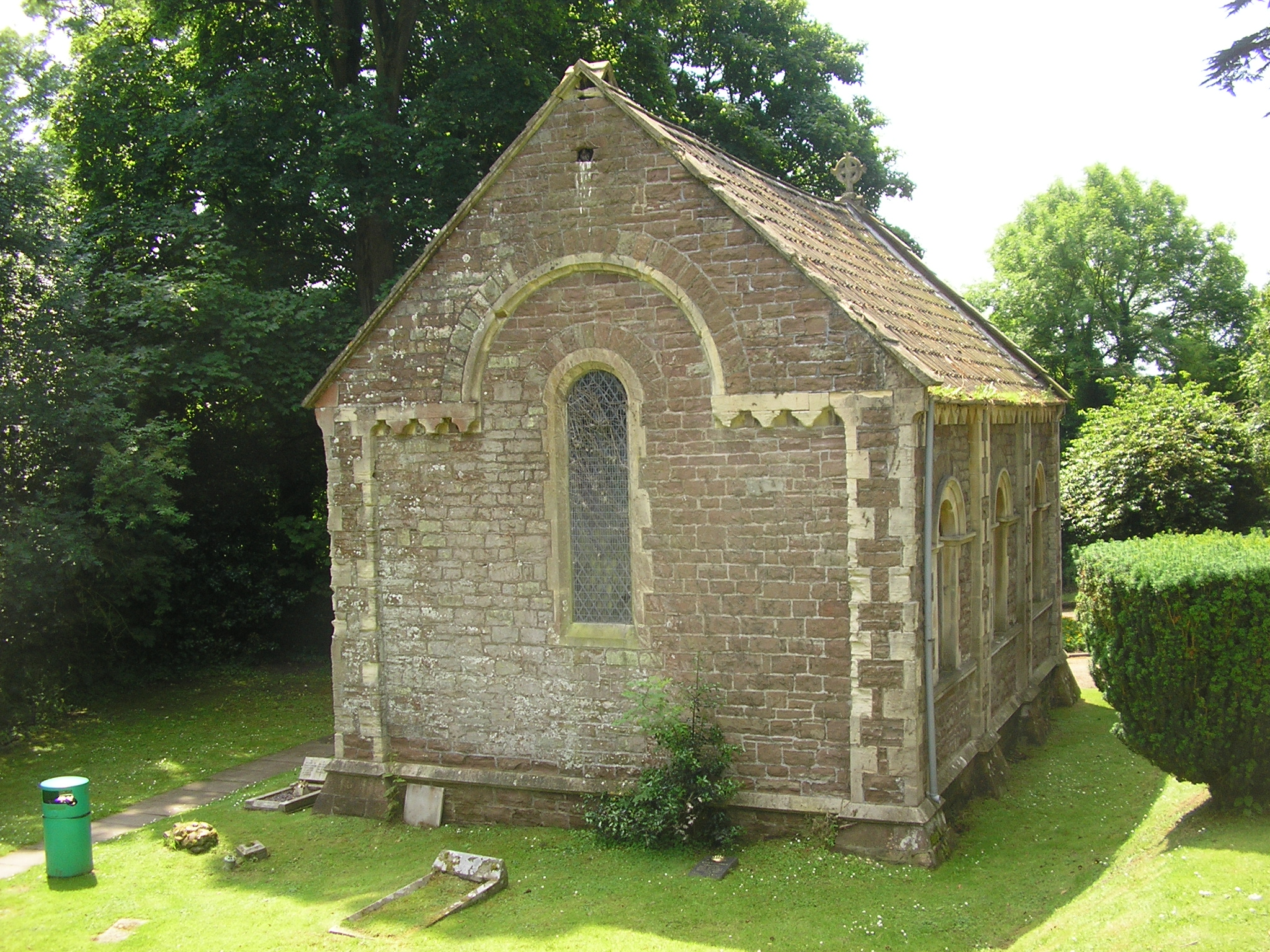
Rear of the chapel

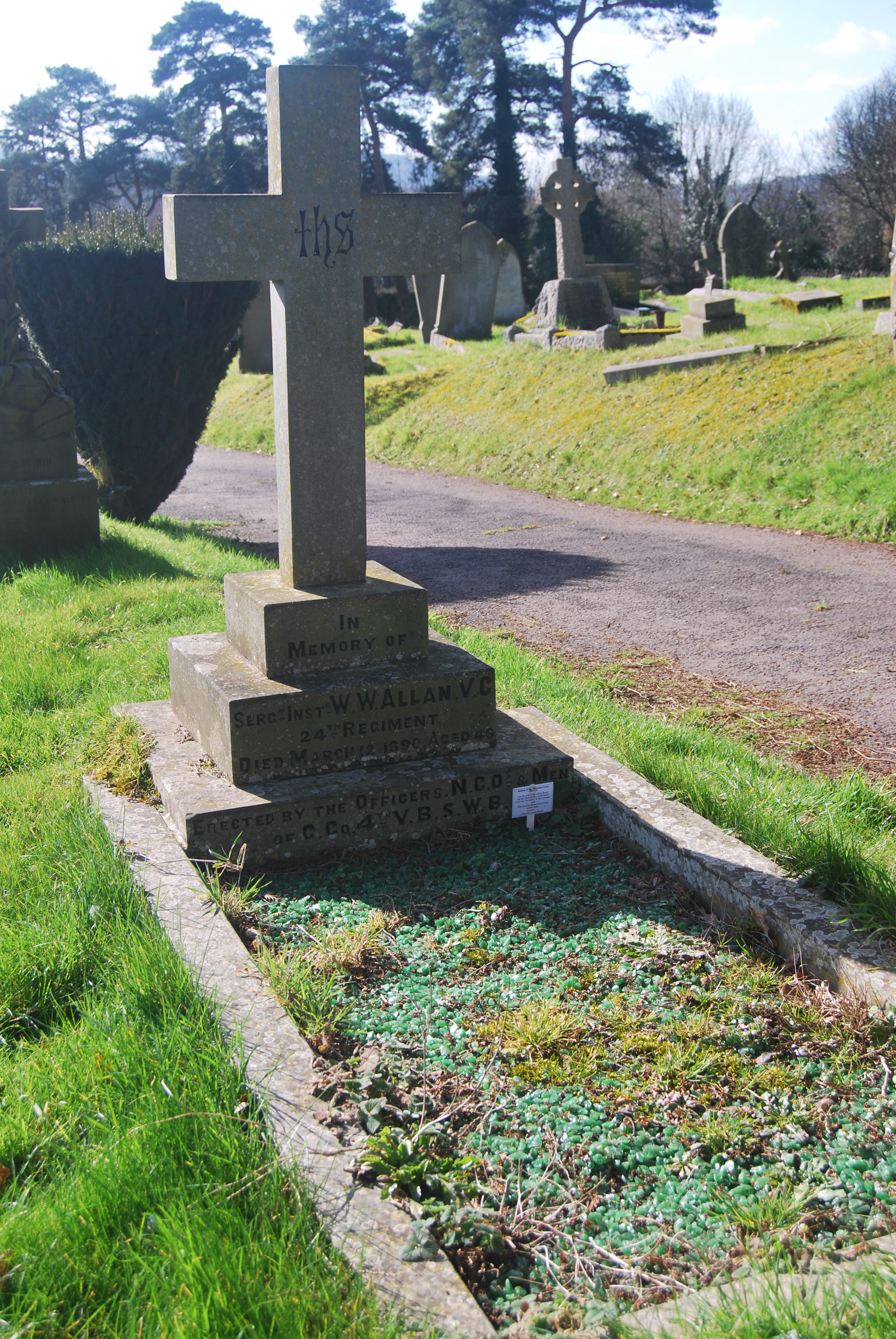
Grave of William Wilson Allen VC

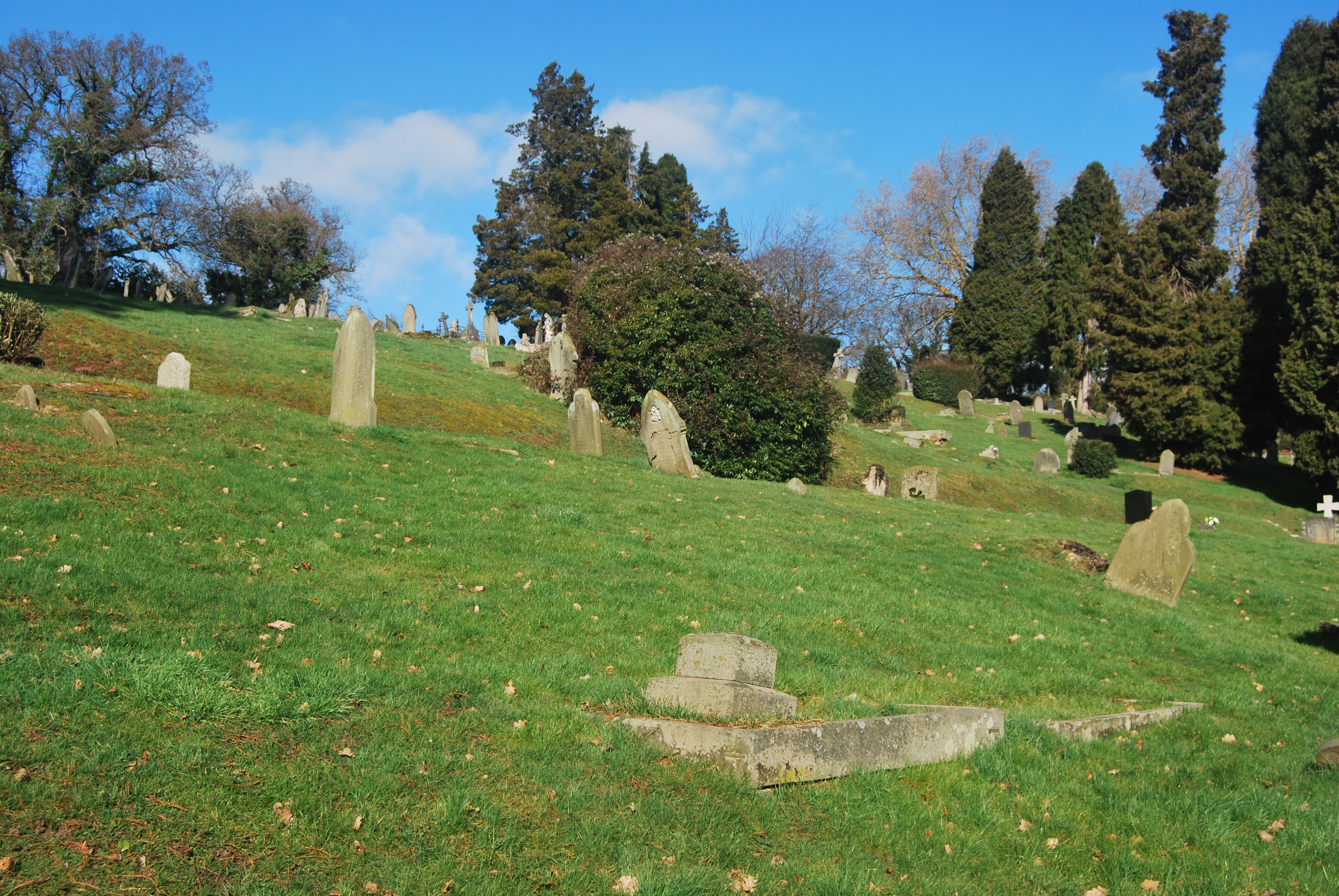
View of the cemetery from the lower road

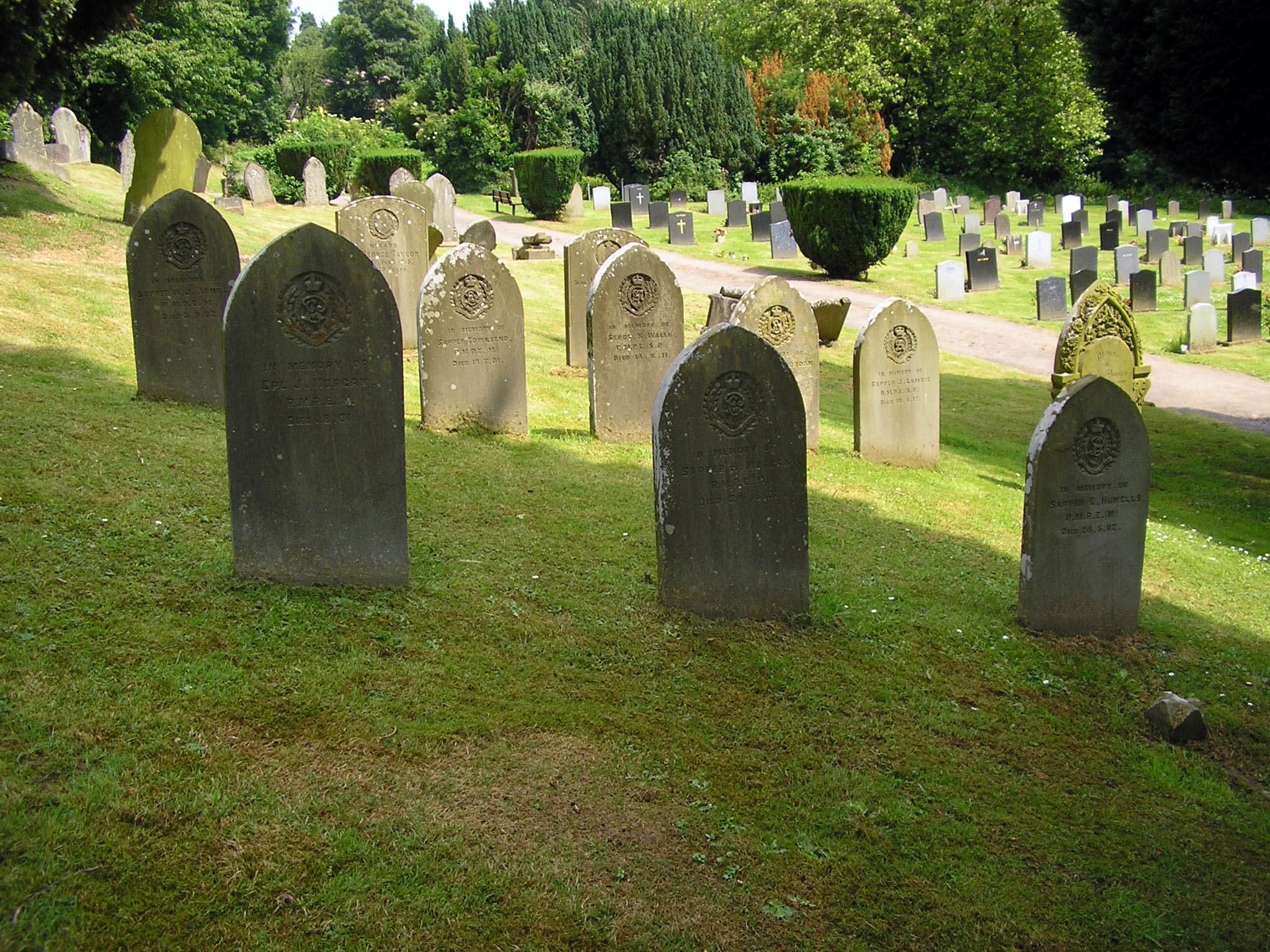
Sloping land sold to the council; the foreground headstones are those of soldiers of the Royal Monmouthshire Royal Engineers who served in the First World War

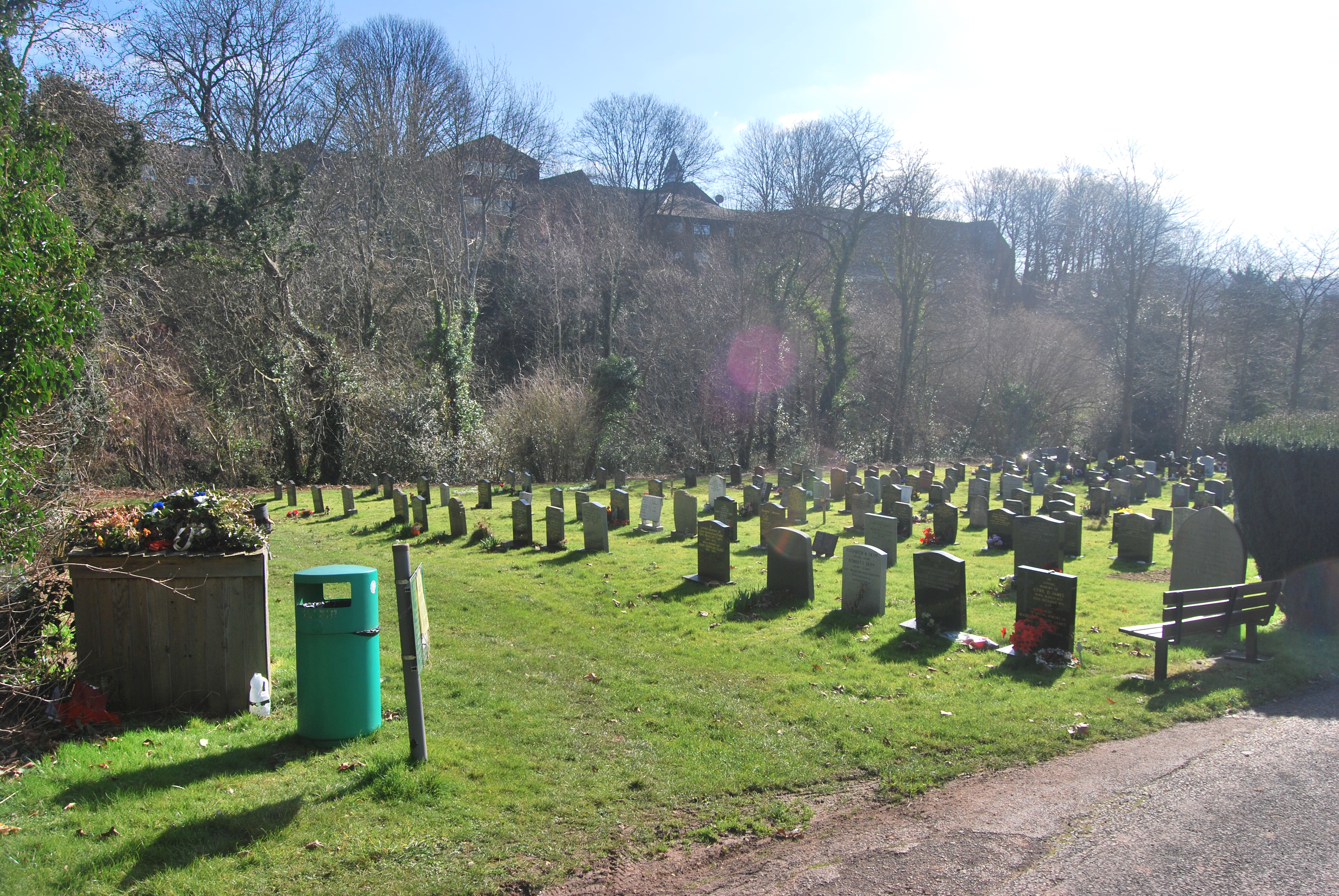
View towards the former workhouse on the hill

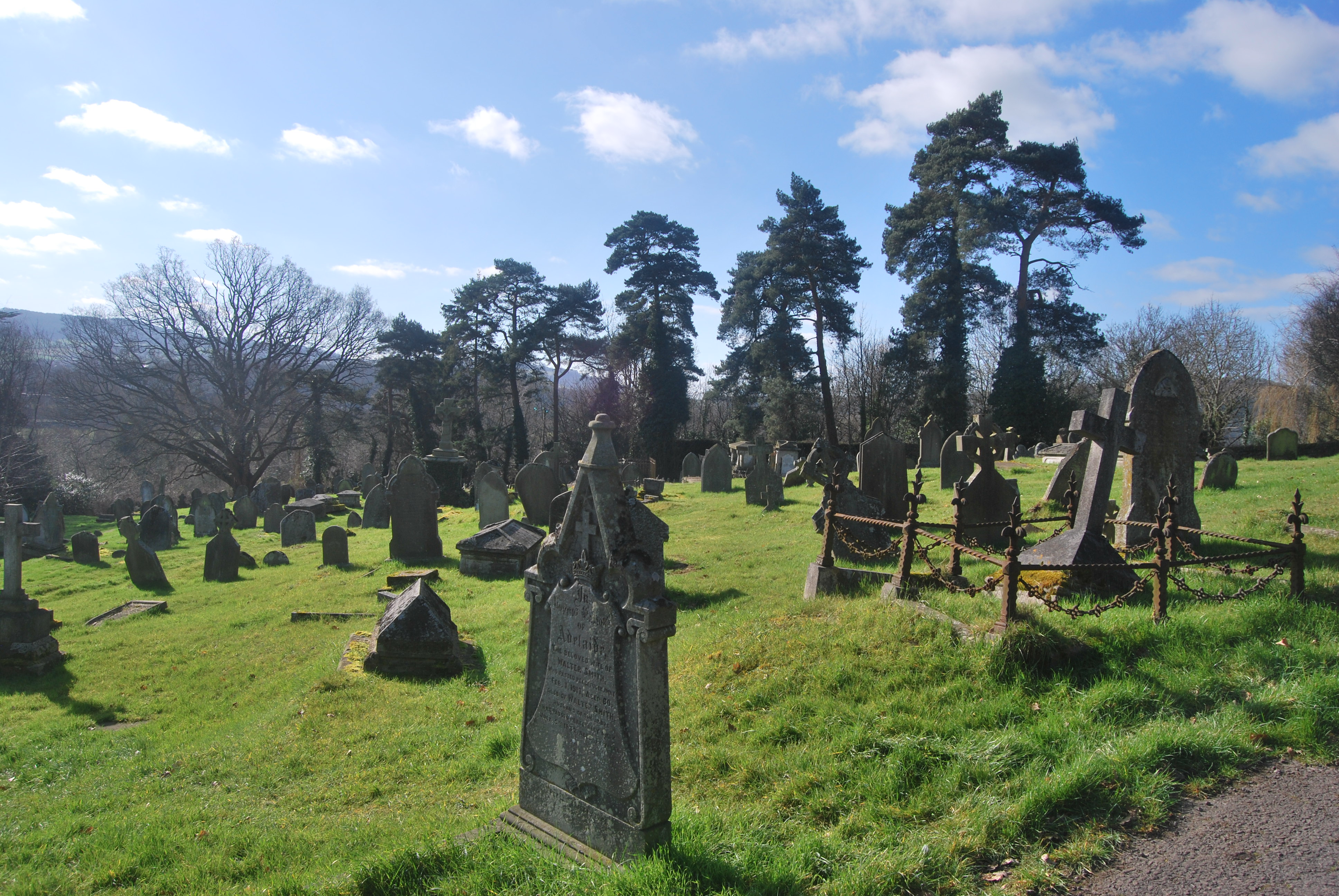
View towards the town from near the top

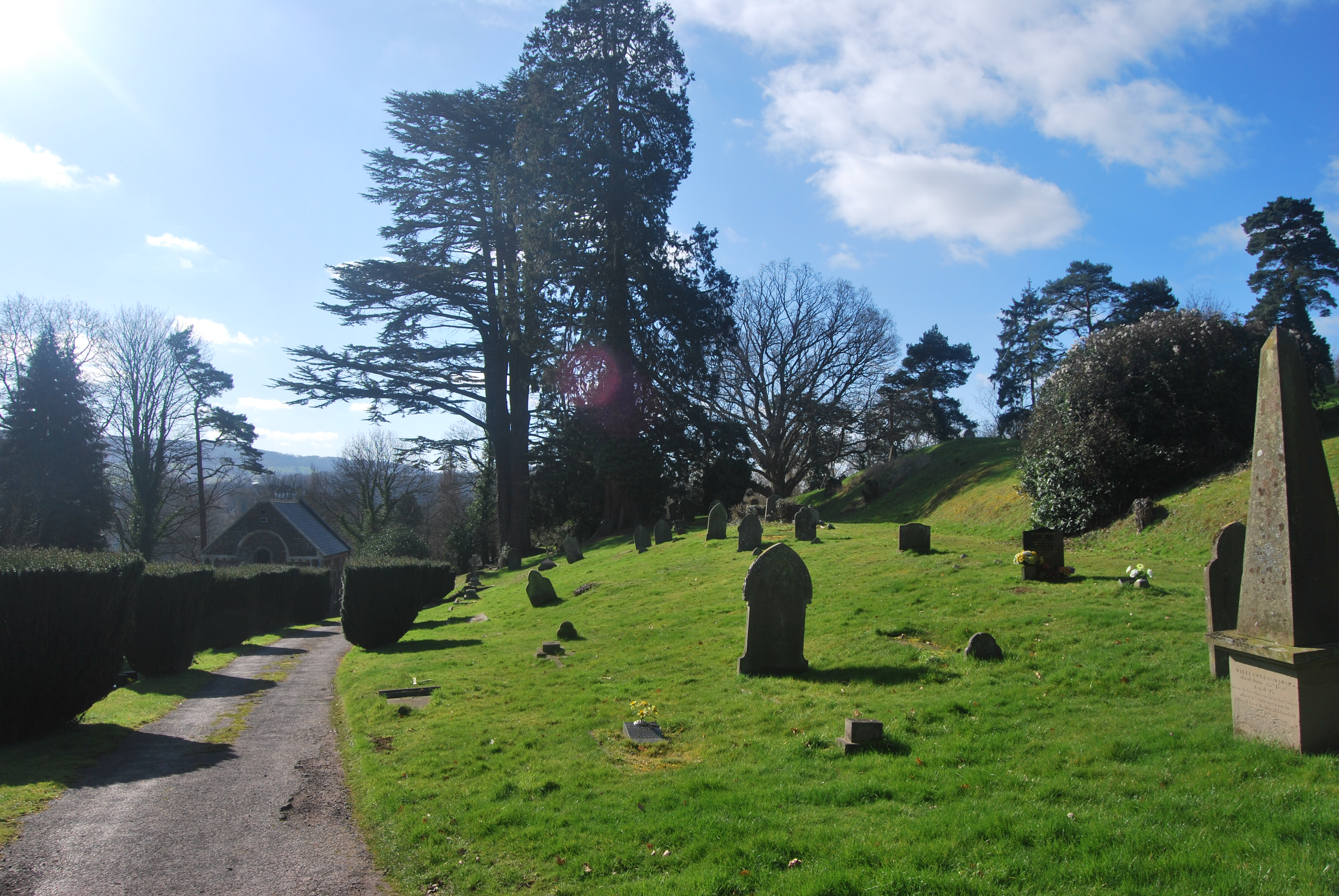
View towards the town from near the bottom

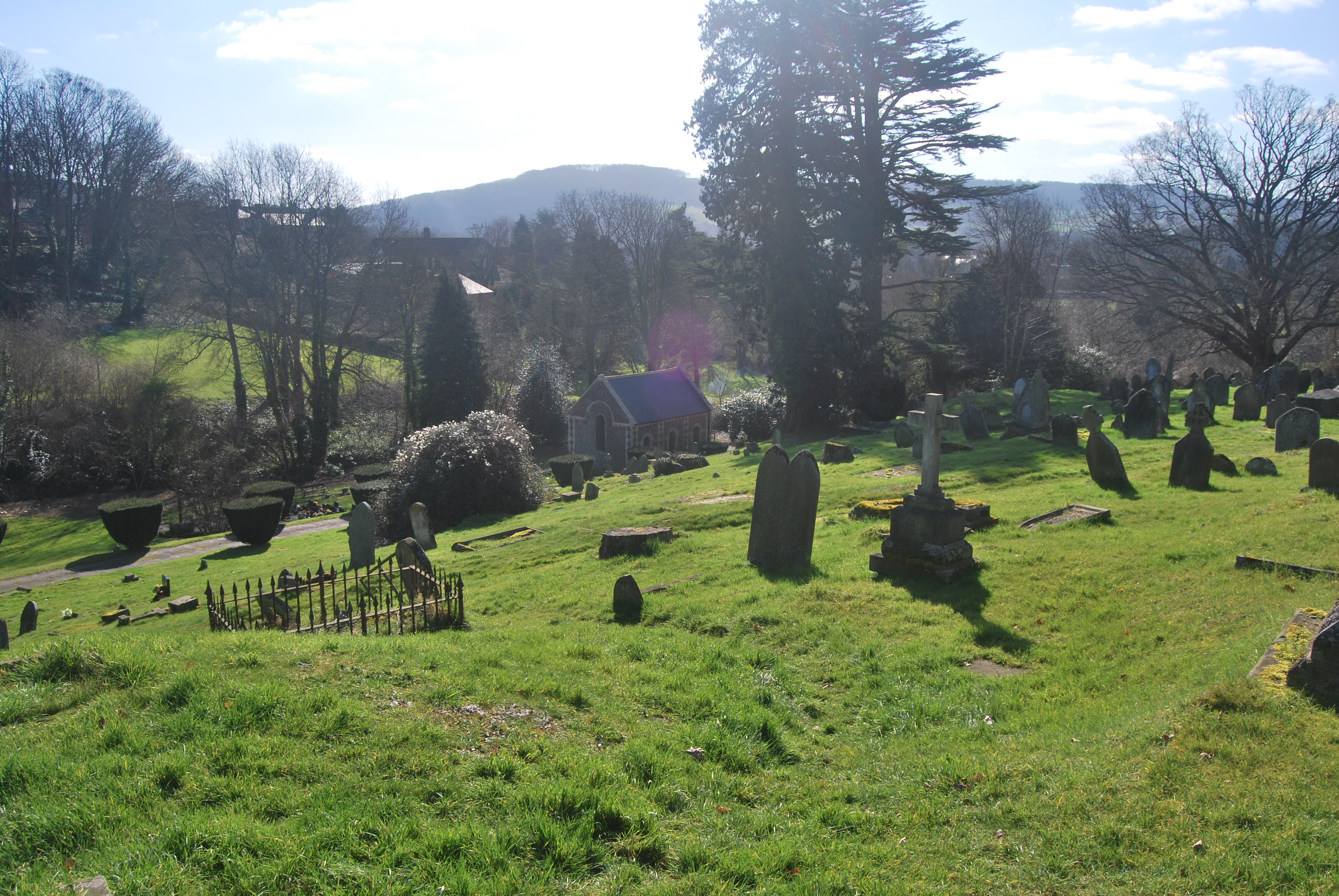
View towards the chapel from halfway up the hill

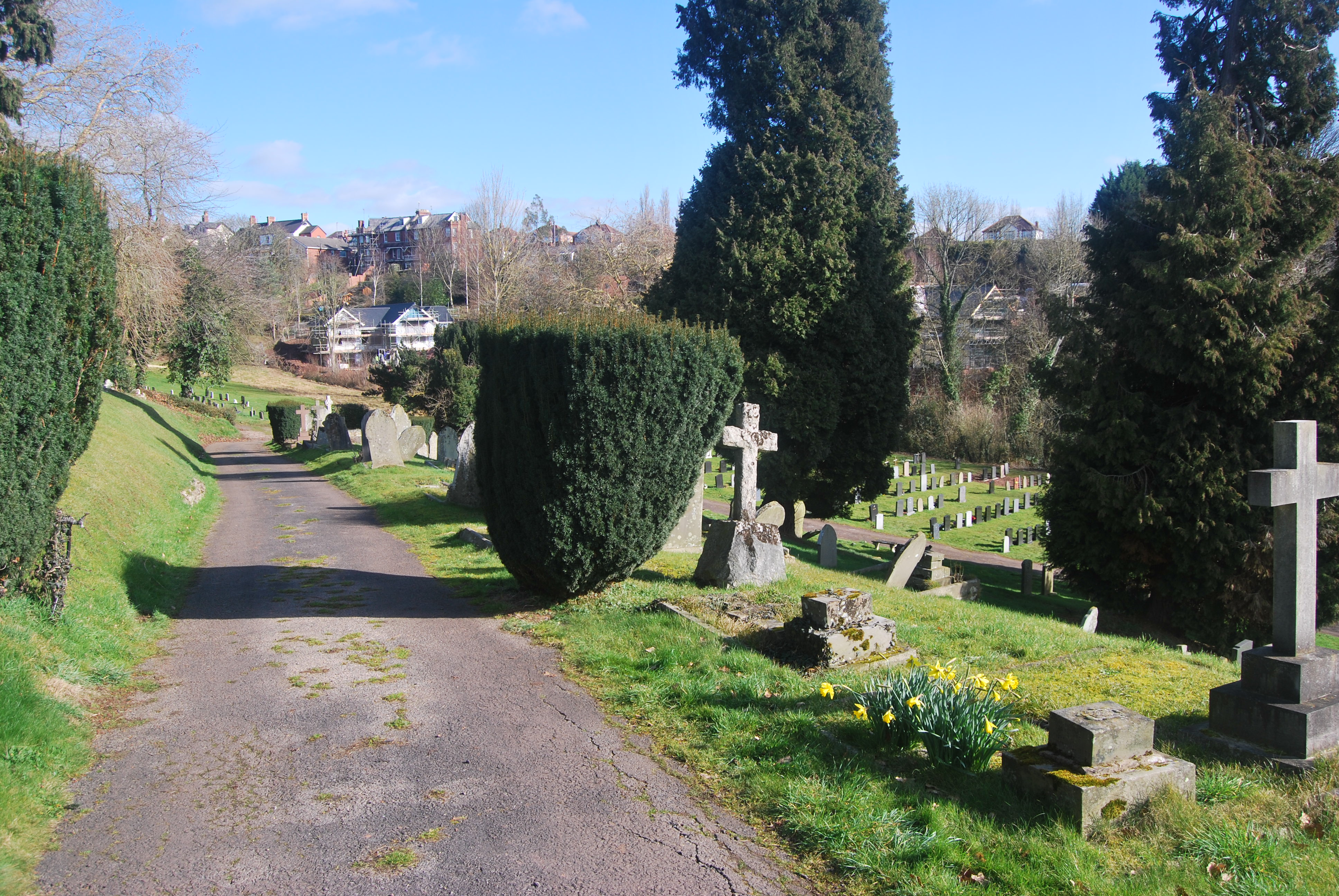
View towards the north east, towards Hereford Road
