= Tarrington, Virginia =

Unincorporated community in Virginia, United States

- Unincorporated community
- Interactive map of Tarrington, Virginia
- Coordinates: 37.544796°N 77.647867°W
- Country: United States
- State: Virginia
- County: Chesterfield
- Named for: Tarrington, England, United Kingdom

Population (2010)
  - Total: 2,840
- Time zone: UTC−5 (Eastern (EST))
  - Summer (DST): UTC−4 (EDT)
- ZIP codes: 23113

Tarrington, also known as Tarrington on the James, is an upper-middle class neighborhood located in Midlothian, a part of Chesterfield County, Virginia, United States. The community is located between Virginia State Route 711 (Robious Road).

The community is also the home of James River High School and is adjacent to Robious Landing Park.

Tarrington began construction in the mid-2000s and finished construction in the mid-2010s. The planned community contains 710 homes.
