= Little Marcle =

Village in Herefordshire, England

Coordinates: 52.025124°N 2.4849575°W

- St Michael & All Angels church

- Location within Herefordshire
- Area: 5.053 km^{2} (1.951 sq mi)
- Population: 152 (2011 census)
  - Density: 30/km^{2} (78/sq mi)
- Civil parish: Little Marcle
- Unitary authority: County of Herefordshire
- Shire county: Herefordshire
- Region: West Midlands
- Country: England
- Sovereign state: United Kingdom
- Police: West Mercia
- Fire: Hereford and Worcester
- Ambulance: West Midlands

Little Marcle is a village and civil parish 10 miles (16 km) east of Hereford, in the county of Herefordshire, England. In 2011 the parish had a population of 152. The parish touches Aylton, Dymock, Ledbury and Much Marcle. Little Marcle shares a parish council with Aylton, Munsley and Pixley called "Pixley and District Parish Council".

== Landmarks ==
There are 18 listed buildings in Little Marcle. Little Marcle has a church called St Michael & All Angels. There was previously another church on the site of All Angels which may have been part of Little Marcle deserted medieval village.

== History ==
The name "Marcle" means 'Boundary wood/clearing', the "Little" part to distinguish from Much Marcle. Little Marcle was recorded in the Domesday Book as Merchelai.
