= Munsley =

Village in Herefordshire, England

Coordinates: 52.064249°N 2.4919602°W

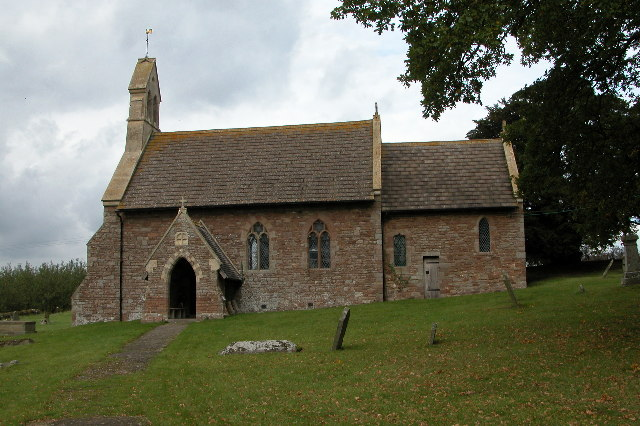

- Location within Herefordshire
- Area: 6.020 km^{2} (2.324 sq mi)
- Population: 96 (2001 census)
  - Density: 16/km^{2} (41/sq mi)
- Civil parish: Munsley
- Unitary authority: County of Herefordshire
- Shire county: Herefordshire
- Region: West Midlands
- Country: England
- Sovereign state: United Kingdom
- Police: West Mercia
- Fire: Hereford and Worcester
- Ambulance: West Midlands

Munsley is a village and civil parish 9 miles (14 km) east of Hereford, in the county of Herefordshire, England. In 2001 the parish had a population of 96. The parish touches Ashperton, Aylton, Bosbury, Canon Frome, Ledbury and Pixley. Munsley shares a parish council with Aylton, Little Marcle, Munsley and Pixley called "Pixley and District Parish Council".

== Landmarks ==
There are 8 listed buildings in Munsley. Munsley has a church called St Bartholomew.

== History ==
The name "Munsley" means 'Mul/Mundel's wood/clearing'. Munsley was recorded in the Domesday Book as Moneslai/Muleslage/Muneslai. On 25 March 1885 Mainstone Court were transferred to Munsley parish from Ashperton, the transferred area had 9 houses in 1891 and Bull's Grove and Hazle Farms was transferred from Putley on 25 March 1885, in 1891 the transferred area had 2 houses. Local legend has it that William Shakespeare’s Hamlet is buried here.
