= Ashperton =

Village in Herefordshire, England

Coordinates: 52.07°N 02.52°W

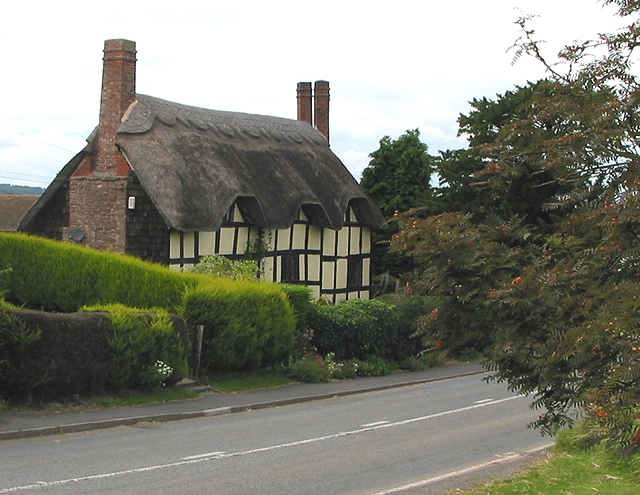
- Thatched cottage in Ashperton

- Location within Herefordshire
- Population: 226 (2011)
- OS grid reference: SO6441
- Shire county: Herefordshire
- Region: West Midlands
- Country: England
- Sovereign state: United Kingdom
- Post town: Ledbury
- Postcode district: HR8
- Police: West Mercia
- Fire: Hereford and Worcester
- Ambulance: West Midlands

Ashperton is a small village, parish and former manor about twelve miles east of the City of Hereford, in Herefordshire, England. The village is on the A417 road, the route of a Roman road from the City of Gloucester, in rolling countryside. Villages nearby include Monkhide, Tarrington and Canon Frome.

== History ==
The manor of Ashperton is listed in the Domesday Book of 1086, following the order of Radlow hundred in Herefordshire. The lord of the manor was William fitzBaderon, who held several other manors in Herefordshire including Ruardean, Whitwick, Munsley and Walsopthorne. The text is translated as follows:

The same William holds Ashperton; Wulfwig held it of Earl Harold and could go where he would. There are five and a half hides paying geld. In demesne are four ploughs and six villans and two bordars with three ploughs and thirteen slaves and twenty acres of meadow. There is woodland one league square. It was and is worth 110 shillings.

On 3 May 1292 William de Grandisson (d.1335) received a licence to crenellate his manor house at Ashperton. It was the birthplace of his younger son and eventual heir John de Grandisson (died 1369), Bishop of Exeter in Devon, who was heir to his elder brother Piers de Grandisson (d.1358). The parish church was originally a chapel of ease to the parish of Stretton Grandison situated 3 miles to the north-west, also held by that family.

== Notable features ==
The village contains the site of a Norman castle and moat and the Church of St Bartholomew, the parish church. The disused Hereford and Gloucester Canal runs nearby. The village has a mix of black and white cottages and 1970s housing.
