= William Allen (VC 1879) =

Recipient of the Victoria Cross (c.1843–1890)

William Wilson Allen VC
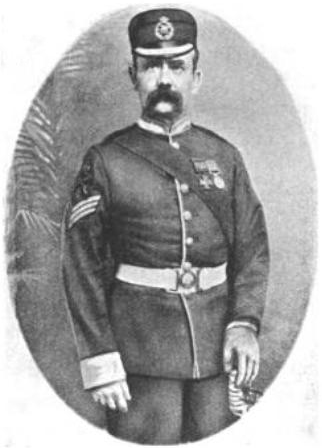
- Born: c. 1843; Kyloe, Northumberland, England
- Died: 12 March 1890 (aged 46–47); Monmouth, Monmouthshire, Wales
- Burial place: Monmouth Cemetery; 51°49′10.17″N 2°42′53.29″W
- Military career
- Allegiance: United Kingdom/British Empire
- Branch: British Army
- Rank: Sergeant
- Units: 24th Regiment of Foot
- Conflicts: Anglo-Zulu War; Rorke's Drift
- Awards: Victoria Cross; South Africa Medal

William Wilson Allen VC (c. 1843 – 12 March 1890) was an English recipient of the Victoria Cross (VC) for his actions at the Battle of Rorke's Drift in January 1879, the highest and most prestigious award for valour in the face of the enemy that can be awarded to British and Commonwealth forces.

== Military career ==
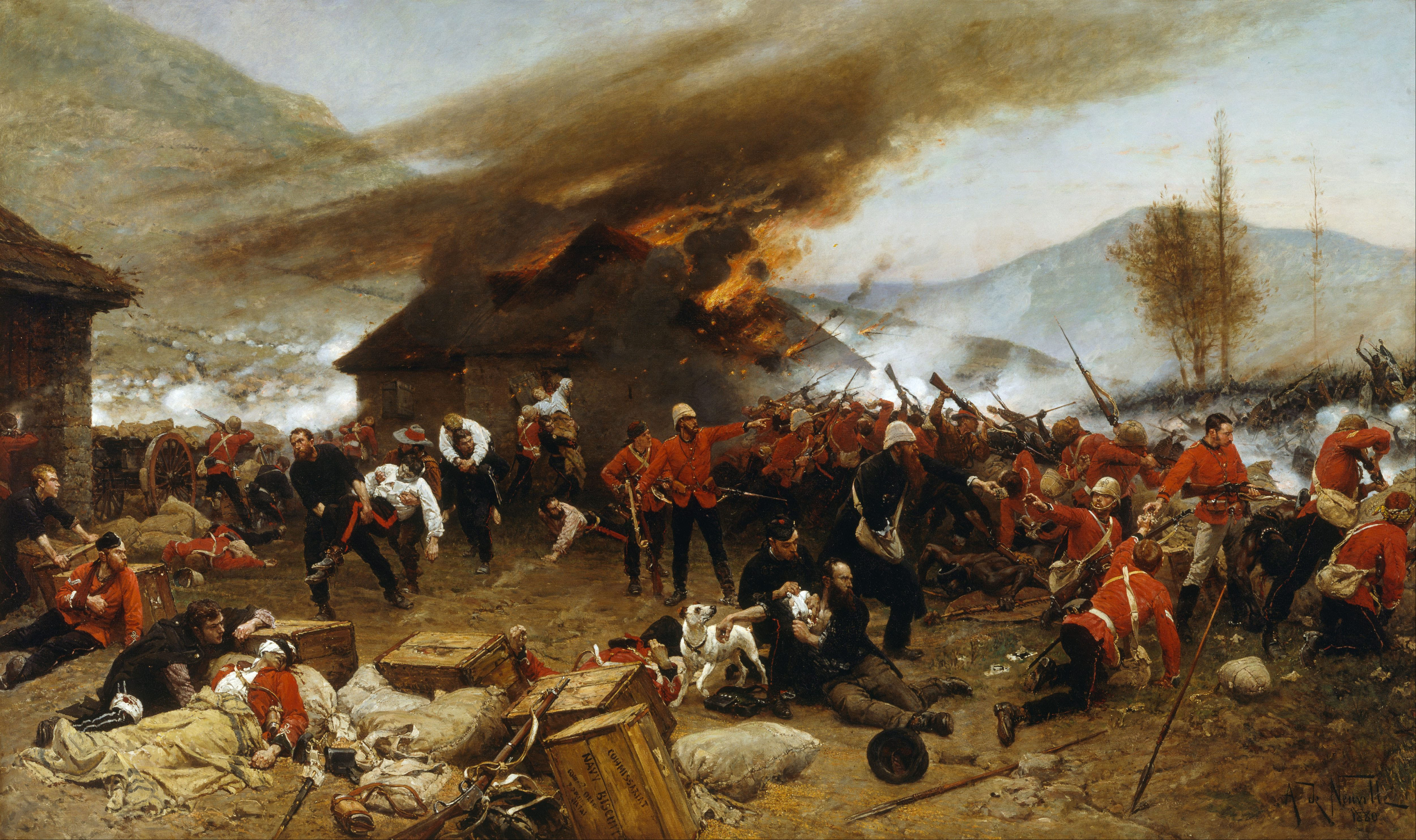
Depiction of the Defence of Rorke's Drift by Alphonse de Neuville; Corporal William Allen, VC [right foreground] handing cartridges to Lt Chard

Allen had joined the 24th Regiment at Aldershot in 1859. He was about 35 years old, a sergeant who had recently been reduced in rank to corporal for being drunk on duty. He was in the 2nd Battalion, 24th Regiment of Foot (later The South Wales Borderers), British Army during the Zulu War when the following deed took place for which he was awarded the Victoria Cross for gallantry in action.

On 22 and 23 January 1879 at Rorke's Drift, Natal, South Africa, Corporal Allen and another man (Frederick Hitch) kept communication with the hospital open, despite being severely wounded. Their determined conduct enabled the patients to be withdrawn from the hospital, and when incapacitated by their wounds from fighting, they continued, as soon as their wounds were dressed, to serve out ammunition to their comrades during the night.

He later achieved the rank of sergeant for the second time.

== Death ==
Allen died of pneumonia in the 1889–1890 flu pandemic on 12 March 1890 at 85 Monnow Street, Monmouth at the age of 46. His body was buried at Monmouth Cemetery, Monmouthshire, with the cost of the grave and the headstone being provisioned by the South Wales Borderers Regiment. A posthumous charity fund was set up to assist his family, his wife, Sarah Ann and his seven children.

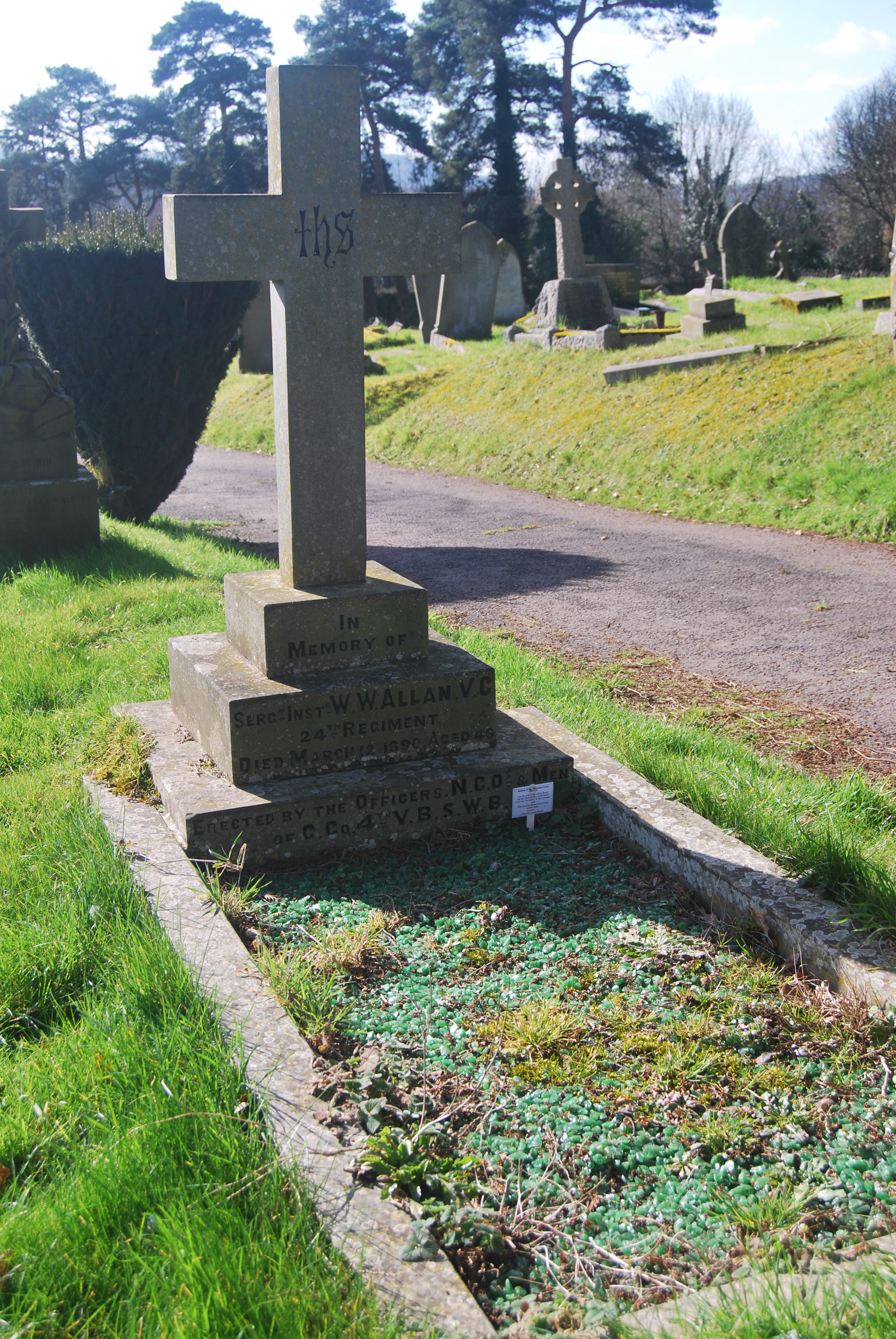
Grave of William Wilson Allen VC

== Legacy ==
His Victoria Cross medal is displayed at the Regimental Museum of The Royal Welsh at Brecon.

Allen was portrayed by the actor Glynn Edwards in the 1964 cinema film Zulu.
