= St Mary's Priory Church, Monmouth =

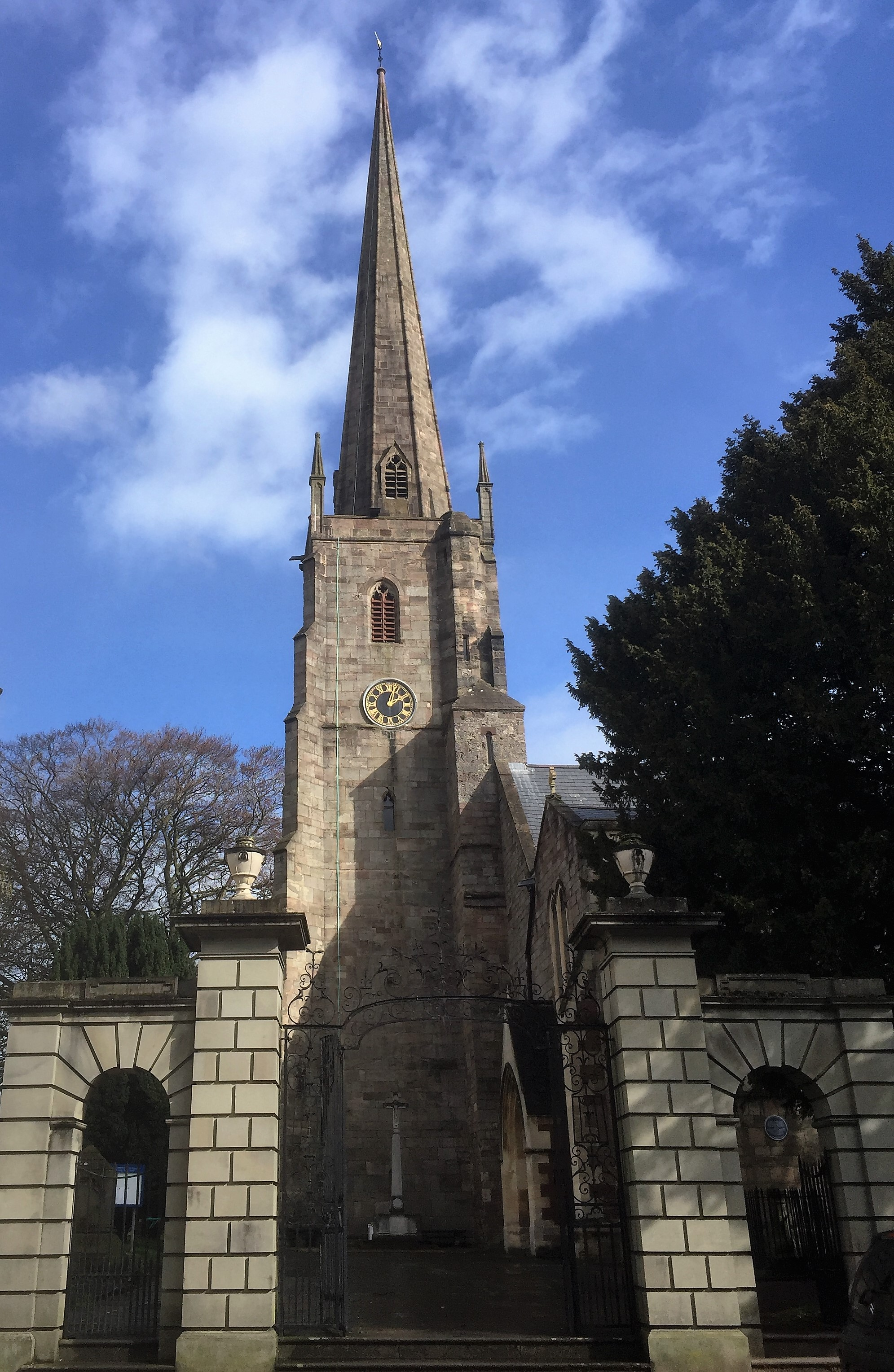
- Entrance to the church on Whitecross Street
- St Mary's Priory Church, Monmouth
- 51.8132°N 2.714°W
- Location: Monmouth, Monmouthshire
- Country: Wales
- Denomination: Anglican
- Website: Monmouth Parishes: St Mary's Priory Church

History
- Status: Church in Wales parish church
- Founder: Withenoc (or Gwethenoc)
- Dedication: Saint Mary the Virgin

Architecture
- Functional status: Active
- Heritage designation: Grade II*
- Designated: 27 June 1952
- Architects: Francis Smith of Warwick; George Edmund Street

Specifications
- Materials: Old Red Sandstone (tower)

Administration
- Diocese: Diocese of Monmouth
- Deanery: Newport and Monmouth
- Parish: Monmouth

Clergy
- Vicar: Rev. Timothy Dack

St Mary's Priory Church, in Whitecross Street, Monmouth, Monmouthshire, Wales, is an Anglican church founded as a Benedictine priory in 1075. The current church dates mostly from the 18th and 19th centuries. It was designated a Grade II* listed building in 1952. It is one of 24 buildings on the Monmouth Heritage Trail.

== History and architecture ==
=== Exterior ===
The priory church was founded by Withenoc (or Gwethenoc), a Breton who became lord of Monmouth in 1075 after Roger de Breteuil, the son of William fitzOsbern, was disgraced for allowing his sister to wed the Earl of Norfolk against the wishes of King William. There is evidence in the Book of Llandaff of an earlier 8th-century Celtic church at Aper Menei, which is interpreted to be Monmouth, and it has been tentatively suggested that this may have been on the site of the later priory.

The priory was granted to the Abbey of St Florent at Saumur, and was consecrated in the presence of William fitzBaderon in 1101. It was extended and became the parish church later in the twelfth century. Few traces of the early building remain, other than a short section of Norman wall.

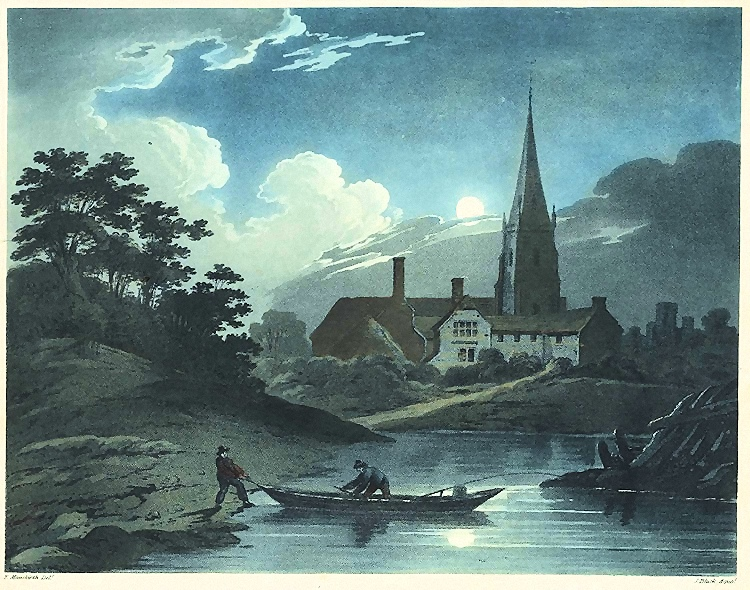
1799 aquatinted print by R. Ackermann

The tower, of Old Red Sandstone with three stages, dates from the fourteenth century. The building deteriorated after the Dissolution of the Monasteries in 1536. By 1730, the church was described as ruinous and decayed. Significant rebuilding was undertaken in 1736-7 by Francis Smith of Warwick, who constructed an entirely new nave, but this work has also mostly gone. In 1743 a new spire rising to a height of 60 metres (200 ft), was constructed to the designs of Nathaniel Wilkinson of Worcester. In the late nineteenth century, the church was almost completely rebuilt by George Edmund Street. Street's structural report of 1879 was dismissive: "it might be said to have no style at all, at any rate it [is] extremely unattractive and uninteresting." His original intention was complete demolition and rebuilding, but the estimated cost of £22,000 was too high and he was limited to reconstruction, in which the tower and the steeple were retained.

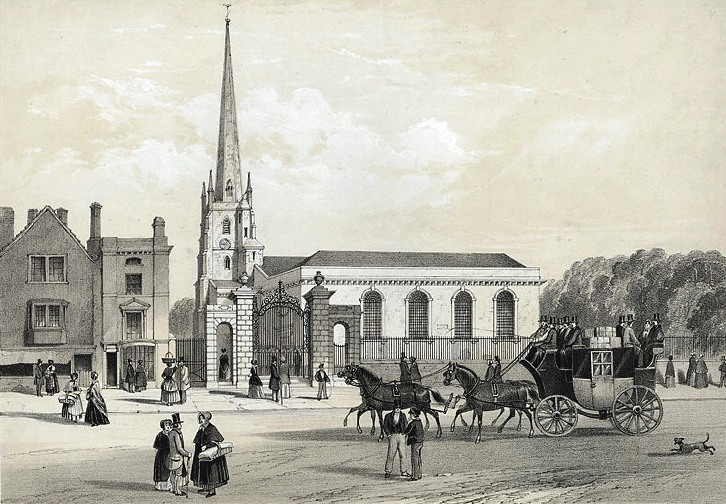
St Mary's Church by E.Heath, in about 1865

The church is the tallest building in Monmouth, with the gilded cockerel weather vane some 205 ft (62 m) above the ground. The cockerel was restored after a lightning strike in 2007 and reinstated following repair to the spire around 2010. It was again restored in 2023 following storm damage. (Note: The cockerel was designed by John Rudge, a metal worker from Ross-on-Wye, and constructed at the Vivian metalworks at Swansea. Another such example is atop the spire of the Church of St Giles, Goodrich.) The church is a Grade II* listed building.

=== Interior ===
The interior dates from 1882 and was designed to accommodate 1,000 people, but many pews have now been removed. There are two chapels, but these were later additions. The rood was originally plain wood and has only recently been coloured. Part of the rood screen has been moved to the rear of the church to form a narthex or vestibule. The Lady Chapel contains an English Altar with four riddel posts each with an unusual brass base and wrought iron capital supporting a newly gilded angel. The screen features the ironwork and woodwork of Letheren and Martin (the latter of whom made the Speaker's Chair in the House of Commons and the pulpit of St Paul's Cathedral).

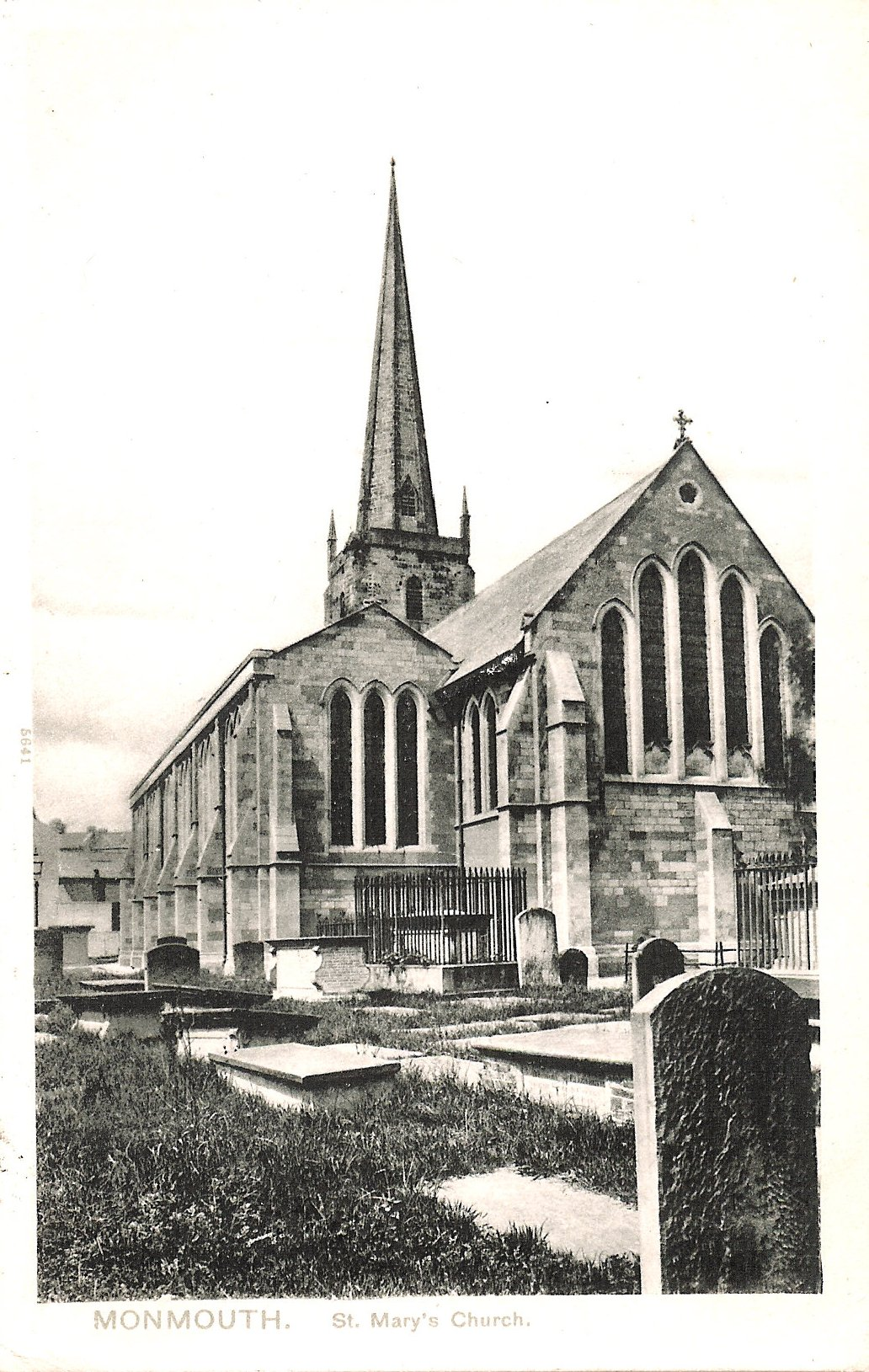
St Mary's Church, 1905

The interior stained glass is mainly by Charles Eamer Kempe, of the 1880s. The Four Rivers of Paradise window is particularly fine, depicting the Pishon, Gihon, Tigris and Euphrates. The window was donated by Charles Henry Crompton-Roberts, of Drybridge House, a local business man and landowner who was a substantial benefactor to the town. After Kempe's death, his company also undertook the Four Edwards Window on the South wall, completed in 1911. It features Edward VII, a close friend of Lord Llangattock of The Hendre, a local landowner, as well as Edward the Confessor, Edward I and Edward, the Black Prince. In the South aisle is a window designed in 1938 by the church curate, B. F. L. Clarke, showing Gwethenoc, Geoffrey of Monmouth, and the church's architects Francis Smith and G. E. Street. The North chapel has screens by William Douglas Caroe. The reredos, a large altar painting entitled The Adoration of the Magi, is by James Watney Wilson, RA, and dates from 1888. The architectural historian John Newman, in his Gwent/Monmouthshire Pevsner, describes it as "large and austere." The church contains several notable memorials, including one to Philip Fisher, architect of the Shire Hall, and Philip Meakins Hardwick, responsible for the monuments on The Kymin.

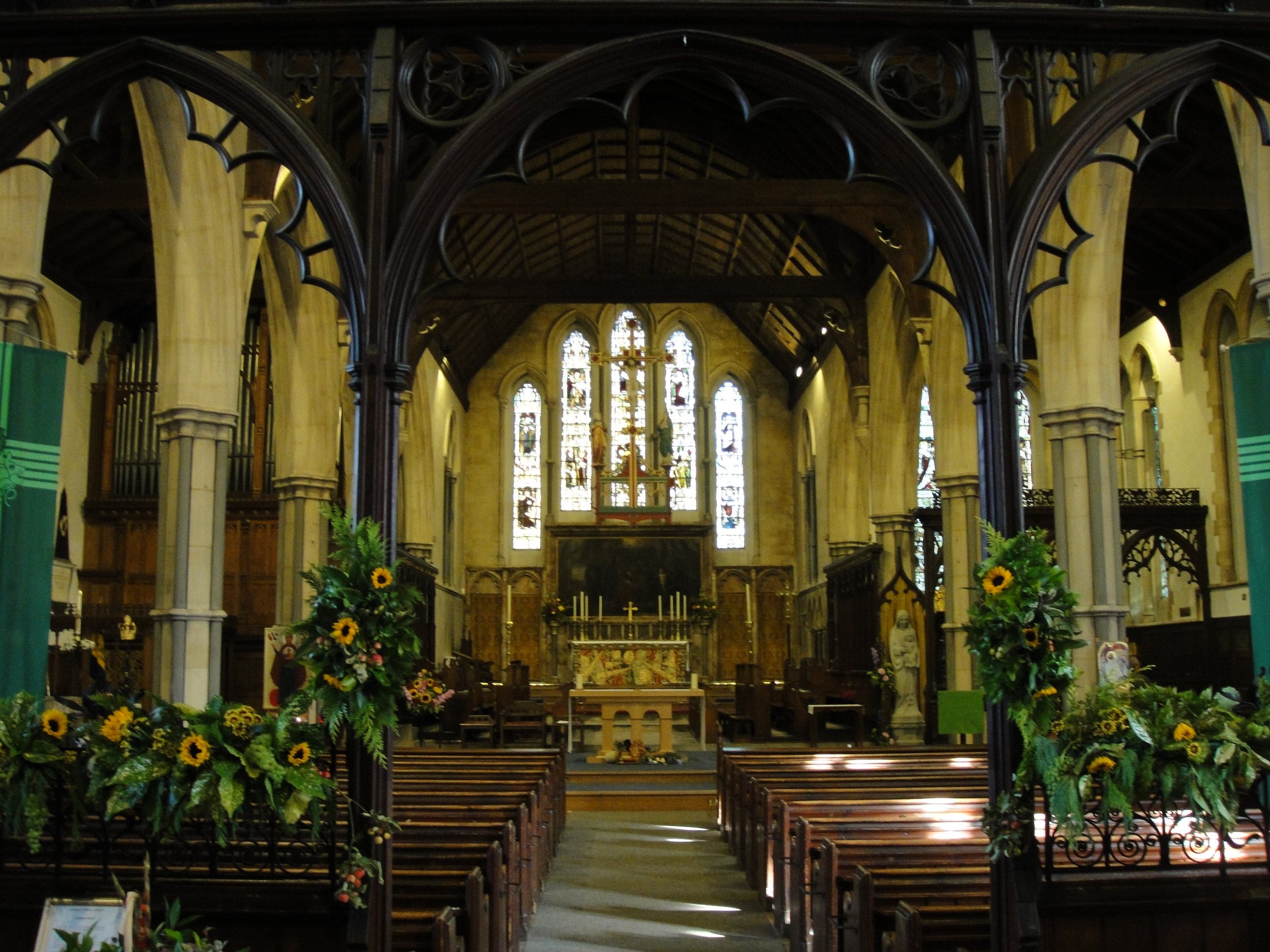
Interior of the church

The walls of the South aisle display sets of rare medieval tiles. Many were made in Malvern, but recent excavation on Monk Street has uncovered the kiln in which a number of the earlier examples were fired locally. One of the tiles shows the Bohun swan, a swan in chains, the badge of Mary de Bohun, the mother of Henry V who was born in the nearby castle, and another shows the arms of Westminster Abbey.

The fine pipe organ is situated to the left of the chancel and has been recently renovated. The church now hosts a series of organ recitals throughout the summer. The font is of carved Portland stone and green Genoa marble, and was installed in the present position in 1982.

=== The bells ===
The precise origins of the bells are unknown but earliest records show that in 1673 the church: ".. paid Robert Marshall for staples and locks and keys and the irons for five bells – £1.2.6". The bells were repaired and re-hung during the 1880s rebuilding. In 1953 they were overhauled and rededicated but tuning issues saw further work in 1972 and 1982.

The eight current bells are as follows:

Bell	Diameter (mm)	Weight (kg)	Note
1	710	246	Eb
2	740	248	D
3	800	305	C
4	865	357	Bb
5	950	510	Ab
6	990	550	G
7	1070	660	F
8	1200	860	Eb

Kelly's Directory of 1901 also mentions ".. a fire bell, recast at the expense of Mr. Job Rees, late captain of the fire brigade." The bell, which originally hung on the outside of the tower, and which was originally cast in 1604, is now on display in the entrance porch to the church.

== The graveyard and surroundings ==
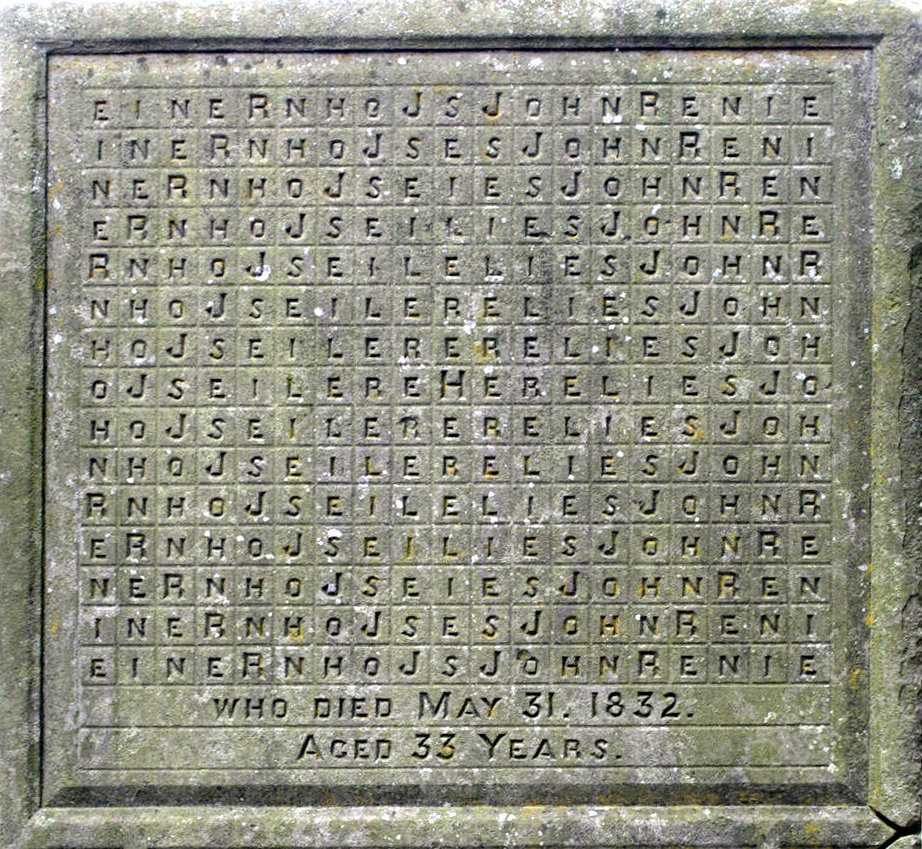
Gravestone of John Renie

At the eastern end of the churchyard, very near the church, is the gravestone of John Renie, his wife and two sons. Renie was a house painter who died in 1832 at the age of 33. The gravestone was Grade II listed on 8 October 2005. It comprises a rectangular carved 285-letter acrostic puzzle. From the larger H on the centre square the sentence "Here lies John Renie" may be read in any direction. It is claimed that the sentence may be read a total of 46,000 different ways. It is likely that Renie carved the stone himself. Writer and cleric Lionel Fanthorpe has suggested that his intention may have been to confuse the Devil, so ensuring Renie his passage to heaven. In fact, Renie's remains lie elsewhere, as the stone was moved from its original position at a later date. Nevertheless, Renie's gravestone is a listed building as is that of Charles Heath who is also buried in the graveyard.

The churchyard walls, railings, gate piers and gates to the south-east of the church were designated as Grade II* listed buildings on 15 August 1974. The wrought iron churchyard gates date from 1759, and the rusticated stone piers with side arches are from the 1830s.

Remains of the monastic foundation are sited on the adjacent Priory Street, including the Prior's Lodging, with a fine fifteenth century oriel window, often mistakenly thought to have a connection with Geoffrey of Monmouth. Geoffrey is believed to have been born in the town around 1100, probably of Breton parents, about the time that the first priory was being built.

In 1851 Monmouth Cemetery was created when Monmouth Council closed St Mary's Churchyard for burials, when decaying human remains started to appear above ground. This was caused by the raised height of the churchyard. Residents in neighbouring Whitecross Street suffered a high mortality rate as a result and unpleasant odours from the churchyard were also evident.

== Services ==
The church is part of the Monmouth Group of Parishes, within the Church in Wales, and holds regular weekly services. The Diocese of Monmouth, the cathedral of which is the Cathedral Church of St Woolos in Newport, is one of the six dioceses of the Church in Wales.

== Sources ==
- Newman, John (2000). Gwent/Monmouthshire. The Buildings of Wales. Penguin. ISBN 0-14-071053-1.
- Kissack, Keith (1975). Monmouth-the making of a County Town. Phillimore & Co. LTD. ISBN 0-85033-209-5.
- Kissack, Keith (2003). Monmouth and its Buildings. Logaston Press. ISBN 1-904396-01-1. OCLC 55143853.
