= Drybridge (Monmouth ward) =

Coordinates: 51.812°N 2.730°W

- Electoral ward
- Location within Monmouthshire
- Population: 3,432 (2011 census)
- Community: Monmouth
- Principal area: Monmouthshire
- Country: Wales
- Sovereign state: United Kingdom
- UK Parliament: Monmouth
- Senedd Cymru – Welsh Parliament: Monmouth
- Councillors: 1 (County), 3 (Town)

Drybridge is an electoral ward in the town of Monmouth, Monmouthshire, Wales. The ward elects councillors to Monmouth Town Council and Monmouthshire County Council.

== Description ==
The Drybridge county ward covers Monmouth town centre, the residential areas west of Rockfield Road (which heads northwest from the town) and surrounding countryside. The historic Drybridge House is located at the junction of Rockfield Road and Drybridge Road.

According to the 2011 UK Census the population of the Drybridge ward was 3,432.

== Town Council elections ==
The Drybridge county ward is divided into a Town ward (town centre) and Drybridge ward (area northwest of the town centre) for elections to Monmouth Town Council. The Drybridge community ward elects or co-opts three town councillors to the town council (while the Town ward elects a further one).

At the May 2017 elections Matt Deakins retained his seat for the Conservative party, with the other two seats being won by Indy Monmouth candidates, Felicity Cotton and Alice Legg.

A by-election was held on 29 November 2018 to fill one of the seats, though prior to the election the Conservative Party candidate, Martyn Ford, was suspended from the party for his views about multiculturalism which had been published in a leaflet when he stood in the 2015 general election. However, Indy Monmouth councillor, Rachel Jupp won the election, replacing Felicity Cotton.

== County Council elections ==
Drybridge has been a county ward since the 2004 council elections, electing one county councillor to Monmouthshire County Council.

Conservative councillor Alan Wintle represented the ward from 2004, retaining the seat in 2008. He retained the seat in 2012 standing as an independent. He had been deselected by the Conservative Party in February 2012 after he had voted against the deposit stage of Monmouthshire's Local Development Plan, despite party instructions to the contrary. Town councillor and former town mayor, Terry Christopher, stood for the Conservatives.

2012 Monmouthshire County Council election
Party	Candidate	Votes	%	±%
Independent	Alan Wintle	280		
Labour	Mathew Davies	274		
Conservative	Terry Christopher	260		
Plaid Cymru	Sian Damon	50		
Green	Christopher Were	37		
Independent	Stephen Davis	30		

At the May 2017 elections, as part of the resurgence of the Conservatives in the county, Wintle lost his seat (151 votes) coming third behind the Labour Party (237 votes) and the winning Conservative candidate, Mat Feakins (654 votes).

== See also ==
- Overmonnow
- Wyesham
