= Aylton =

Village in Herefordshire, England

Coordinates: 52.036°N 2.499°W

- Village
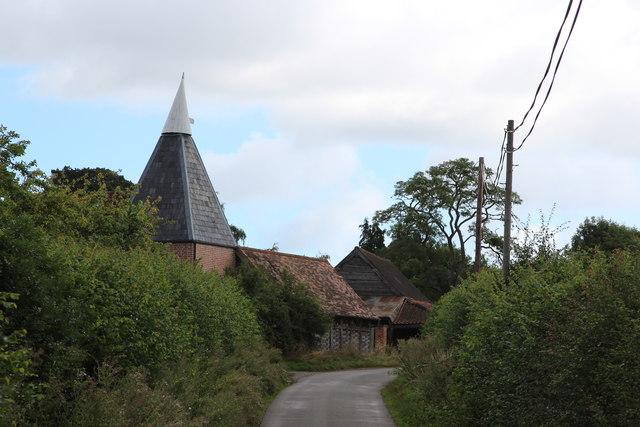
- An oast house in Aylton.

- Location within Herefordshire
- Population: 144
- OS grid reference: SO 65836 37666
- Civil parish: Aylton
- Shire county: Herefordshire
- Region: West Midlands
- Country: England
- Sovereign state: United Kingdom
- Post town: LEDBURY
- Postcode district: HR8

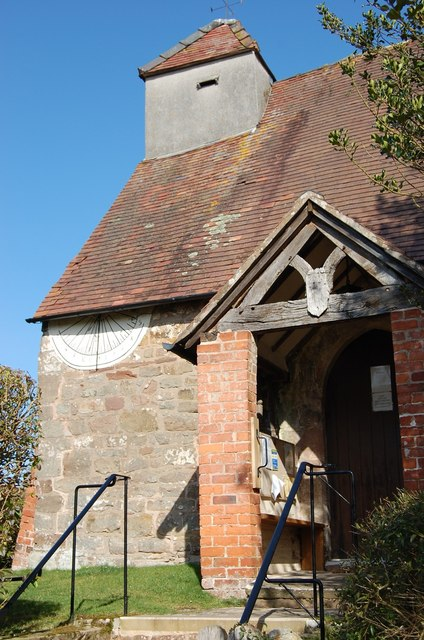
Aylton Church

Aylton is a village in eastern Herefordshire, England. It is 5.5 km (3.4 mi) west of Ledbury. The population of this parish at the 2011 Census was 144. Aylton has a church and shares parish boundaries with Pixley, Putley and Little Marcle.

== History ==
There has been a settlement here since at least Saxon times. The name Aylton is derived from name of the Anglo Saxon female leader of the settlement, Aethelgifu, and is therefore a rare survivor of its gender from that time. In the Domesday Book it is referred to simply as "Marcle" so at that time the parish may have been the "middle" Marcle between Little Marcle and Much Marcle. It is only by a fortuitous manuscript note made in the margin of a 12th-century transcription that we are able to make the link to Aylton. From the Domesday Book we learn that the parish was then held by Turstin Fitzrolf, and before the Norman Conquest was held by Turstig from Earl Harold.

=== Toponymy ===
The earliest written form of the name is Aileuetona in 1138. Later variations are Alhamstone (1278), Aylmeton (1291), Aylston (1341), Ailyneton (1351), Aylistone (1368), and Aylton de la Bath (1619). THe benefice of Aylton was as a "chapel with cure" in 1351. Aylton chapel was also listed as "vetus villa" in the charters of Lanthony Prima in Wales.

=== Aylton Manor ===
The manor was held by the Norman knight de Broy "from an early time". In 1293, in return for the estate, William de Broy was obliged to provide the service of an armoured horse and man for 40 days whenever the king was in the county, commuted to a payment of 24 shillings. The estate at this time comprised 279 acres (including Ast Wood of 30 acres, still existing at the eastern boundary of the parish) with 38 "free" tenants. It was about this time that de Broy gave six acres of land to Little Malvern priory for the creation of a monastery in Aylton, which survives today as Priors Court. Adam of Aylton was chaplain to Bishop Orleton of Hereford, and William of Aylton was clerk to the court in Hereford, both in the early 14th century.

The de Broy family remained in possession until 1414, when Philip Warde (probably the son of John Warde and Isabella de Broy) is still listed as patron of the church. Immediately after, the estate was in the hands of Thomas Walwyn of Hellens, Much Marcle. By one of the earliest wills in the English language, the estate passed to his eldest son Richard Walwyn in 1415. The estate was leased to Leonard Walwyn in 1501 and it was probably during his tenure that the Manorial Barn was built in 1503. The repair of the barn was undertaken between 2006 and 2008, and it now looks much as it would have done when first built over five hundred years ago.

The estate was sold to satisfy the debts of Thomas Walwyn II in 1532, to Roger de Walleden. At this time it comprised 24 dwellings and 414 acres of land, including 100 acres of wood and 12 acres of heath. Following the dissolution, it was owned by the Warnecombe family, sometime Mayors of Hereford, along with Pixley. Through the marriage of James Warnecombe to Maud Harley, the Harley family of Brampton Bryan acquired the estate, and retained the advowson of the church until 1900.

Ownership of the estate itself then passed to Hammond of Bodenham, who leased it to Richard Hankin. He rose from a yeoman tenant farmer to a "gentleman" owner of the "mansion house" by 1700. Hankin was responsible for the form of the farmhouse as it is seen today, together with the extended hop kilns and a dovecote shown on old plans, although the latter has long since disappeared.

The Hankin line continued until 1920 when the estate was sold.

== Putley ==
Putley Church is located between Putley and Putley Green. It was rebuilt in 1875, on the site of a church dating back to William d'Evreux who at the time of the Domesday Book held the manor of 'Poteslepe' as a feudal tenant of Roger de Lacy. Putley Court, a Queen Anne style manor house, was built in 1712 by Edmond Phillips close to the church.
