= Monmouth Town Council =

Community council in Monmouthshire, Wales

Type
- Type: Town council

Leadership
- Mayor: Tom Kirton, Welsh Labour
- Deputy Mayor: David Evans, Welsh Labour
- Seats: 19

Meeting place
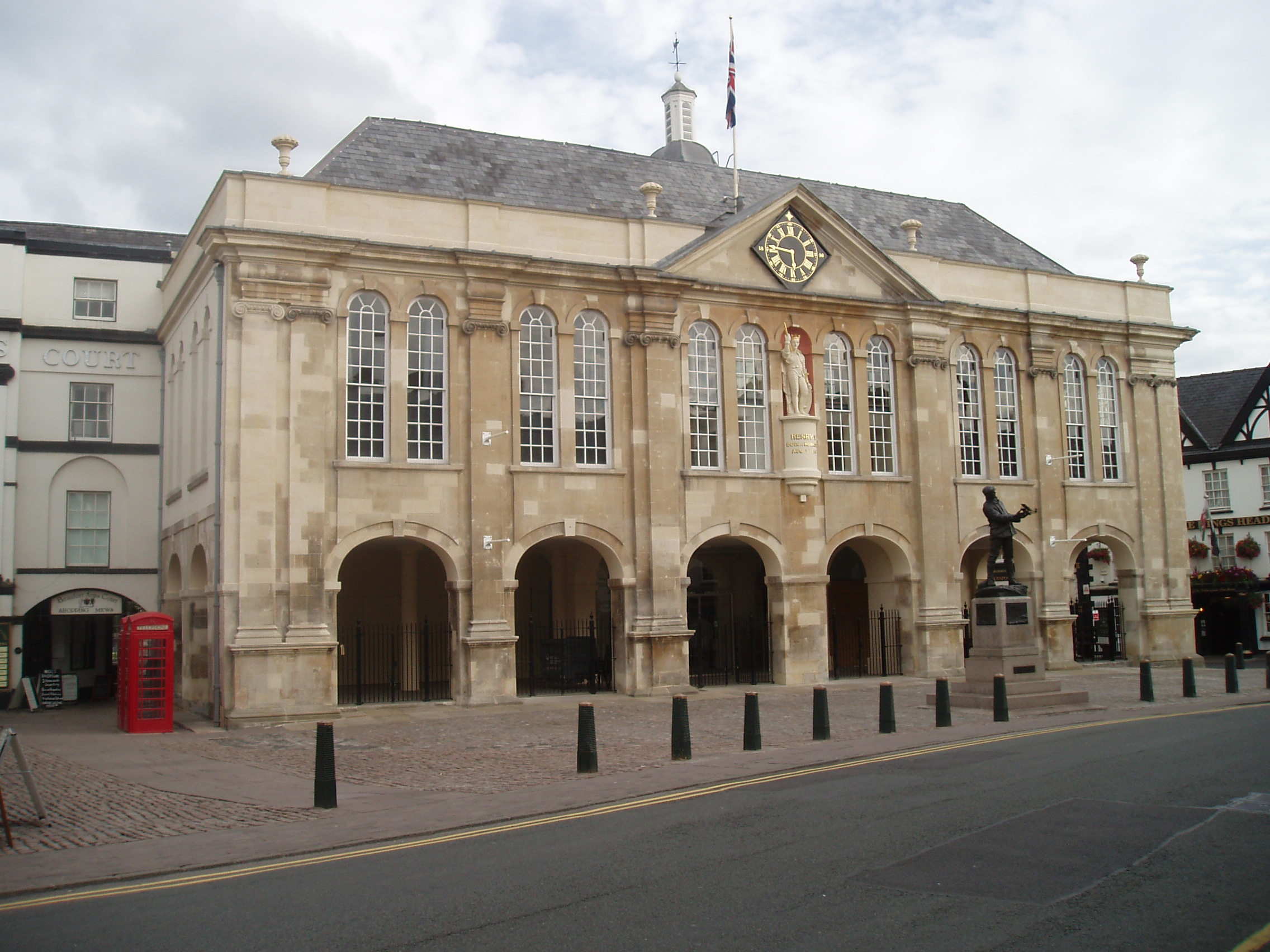
- Shire Hall

Website
- www.monmouth.gov.uk

Monmouth Town Council is the town council of the traditional county town of Monmouth, south-east Wales. The Council comprises 19 members, who are elected every five years. The Mayor is the titular head of the council. The council has its offices in the Shire Hall, a Grade I listed building owned by Monmouthshire County Council.

Monmouth is located within the principal area of Monmouthshire (Welsh: Cyngor Sir Fynwy), one of the 22 unitary authorities of Wales.

== Responsibilities ==
The Town Council is responsible for a limited range of local government functions, including street cleaning, children's play areas, the town's Christmas lights and floral displays, civic events, and grants to local organisations, and is consulted by the County Council on other matters including planning applications. It operates a community projects grants scheme.

== History ==
During the reign of William the Conqueror, a castle was built in Monmouth to control the area and its resources. In addition to the castle and Benedictine priory, the town also had burgesses in medieval times. Burgesses had an exclusive control over trade in the market. This monopoly created the need for a local government organisation, which evolved into Monmouth's town council when in 1447 Henry VI granted a charter providing for sixteen councillors, from whom one was elected as mayor, plus the right to two maces, which remains in practice to this day.

== Shire Hall ==
Shire Hall is the meeting place of the council. Located in the town centre, Shire Hall is a Grade I listed building. It was built in 1724, and was formerly the centre for the Assize Courts and Quarter Sessions for Monmouthshire. It is owned by Monmouthshire County Council, and beside serving as town hall of Monmouth, it is also used as the town's Tourist Information Centre.

== Mayor ==
The Mayor of Monmouth is the titular head of the council. Incumbent mayor is Tom Kirton, who was elected in the annual general meeting of the council on 15 May 2023. The position of Deputy Mayor is held by David Evans.

== Council members ==
Monmouth has five wards: Town, Dixton with Osbaston, Drybridge, Overmonnow, and Wyesham. Four county councillors are elected from these wards for Monmouthshire County Council. Until 2022 the Town Council comprised 16 members. From 2022 it was increased to 19 members, who are elected every five years. Wyesham, Osbaston, Town and Overmonnow wards have four members in the council, while Drybridge has three representatives.

At the May 2017 elections, seven Indy Monmouth councillors won seats on the town council. One of them, Cllr Anna Antebi, resigned from her Town ward seat in September 2017 for personal reasons. Conservative, Rob Caffel, won the seat by two votes at a by-election in November.

May 2017 elections
Wards	Members
Town	Anna Antebi (resigned)
Dixton with Osbaston	Claudia Blair
Dixton with Osbaston	Anthea M Dewhurst (resigned)
Dixton with Osbaston	Jane Lucas
Dixton with Osbaston	Richard Roden
Drybridge	Mat Feakins
Drybridge	Felicity Cotton (resigned)
Drybridge	Alice Legg
Overmonnow	John Fletcher (died)
Overmonnow	Terry Christopher
Overmonnow	Sue McConnel (resigned)
Overmonnow	Jamie Treharne
Wyesham	Ken Breeze
Wyesham	Kelly Jackson-Graham
Wyesham	Jane Gunter
Wyesham	Jess Stephens (resigned)
