= Monmouth Priory =

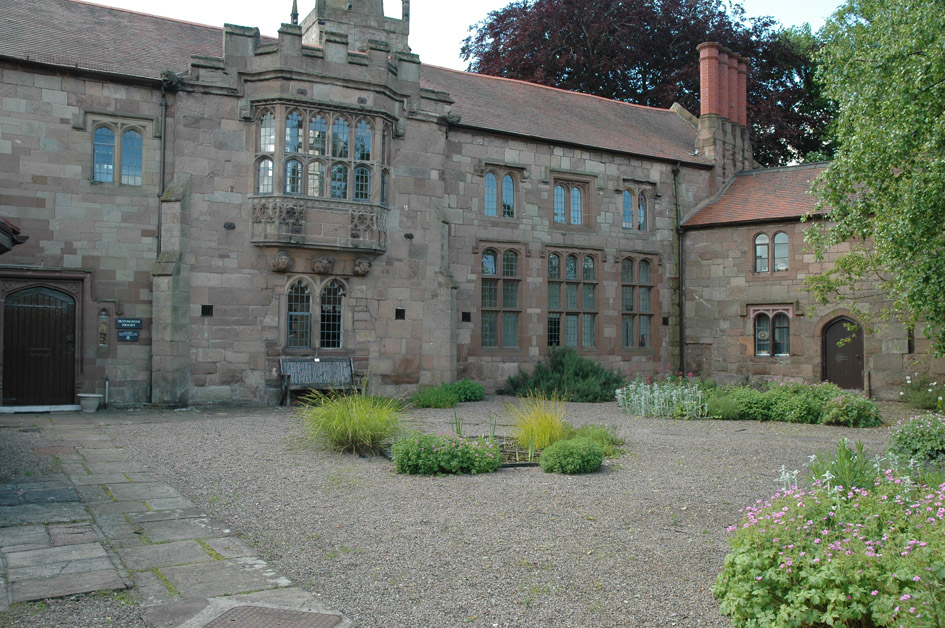
- The Priory, showing the oriel window
- Interactive map of the Monmouth Priory area

General information
- Type: Benedictine priory
- Location: Priory Street, Monmouth, Wales
- Coordinates: 51°48′48.8″N 2°42′50.9″W
- Renovated: 2002

Renovating team
- Architect: Keith Murray

Monmouth Priory, in Priory Street, Monmouth, Wales, is a building that incorporates the remains of the monastic buildings attached to St Mary's Priory Church. The priory was a Benedictine foundation of 1075, and parts of the mediaeval buildings remain. The buildings were substantially redeveloped in the nineteenth century for use as St Mary's National School, and now form a community centre. The complex is a Grade II* listed building as of 27 June 1952. It is one of 24 sites on the Monmouth Heritage Trail.

== History ==
The priory was founded by Withenoc (or Gwethenoc), a Breton who became lord of Monmouth in 1075. There is evidence in the Book of Llandaff of an earlier 8th century Celtic church, and it has been tentatively suggested that this may have been on the site of the later priory. The priory was granted to the Abbey of St Florent at Saumur, and was consecrated in 1101. The priory church was extended and became the parish church later in the twelfth century. The priory was dissolved in 1536.

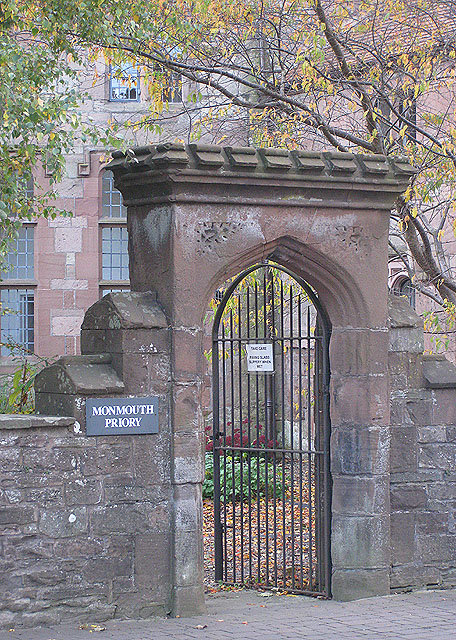
Monmouth Priory entrance gate

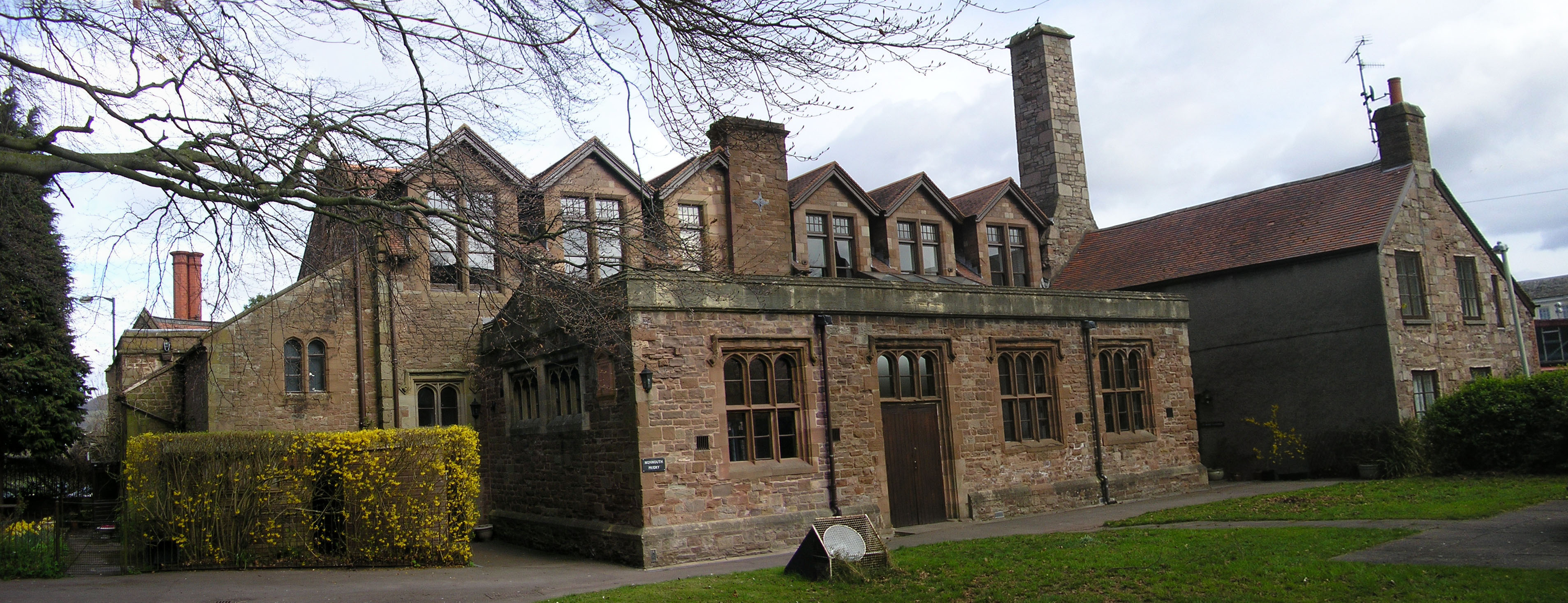
The back of the priory

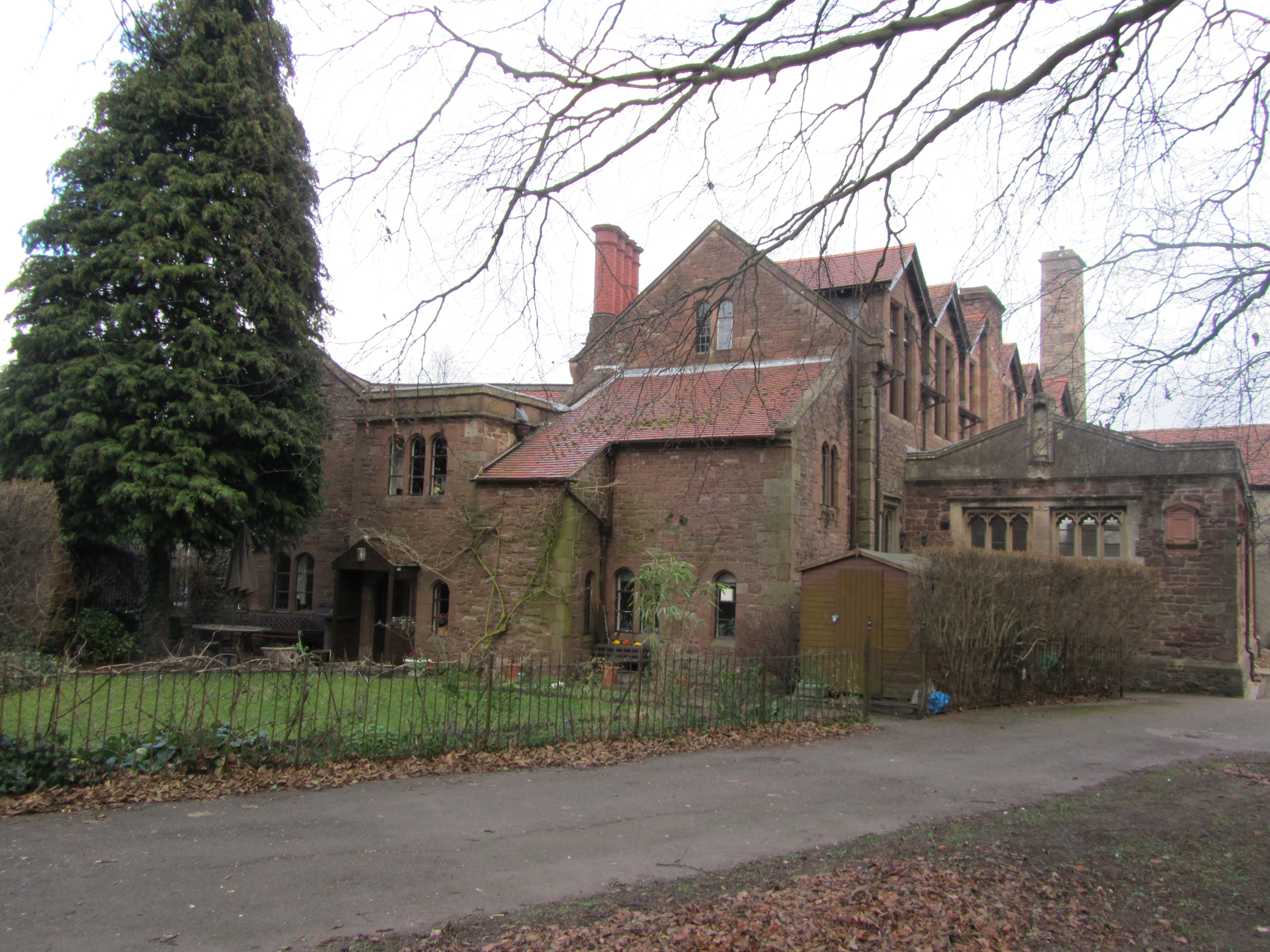
The side of the priory, showing the garden

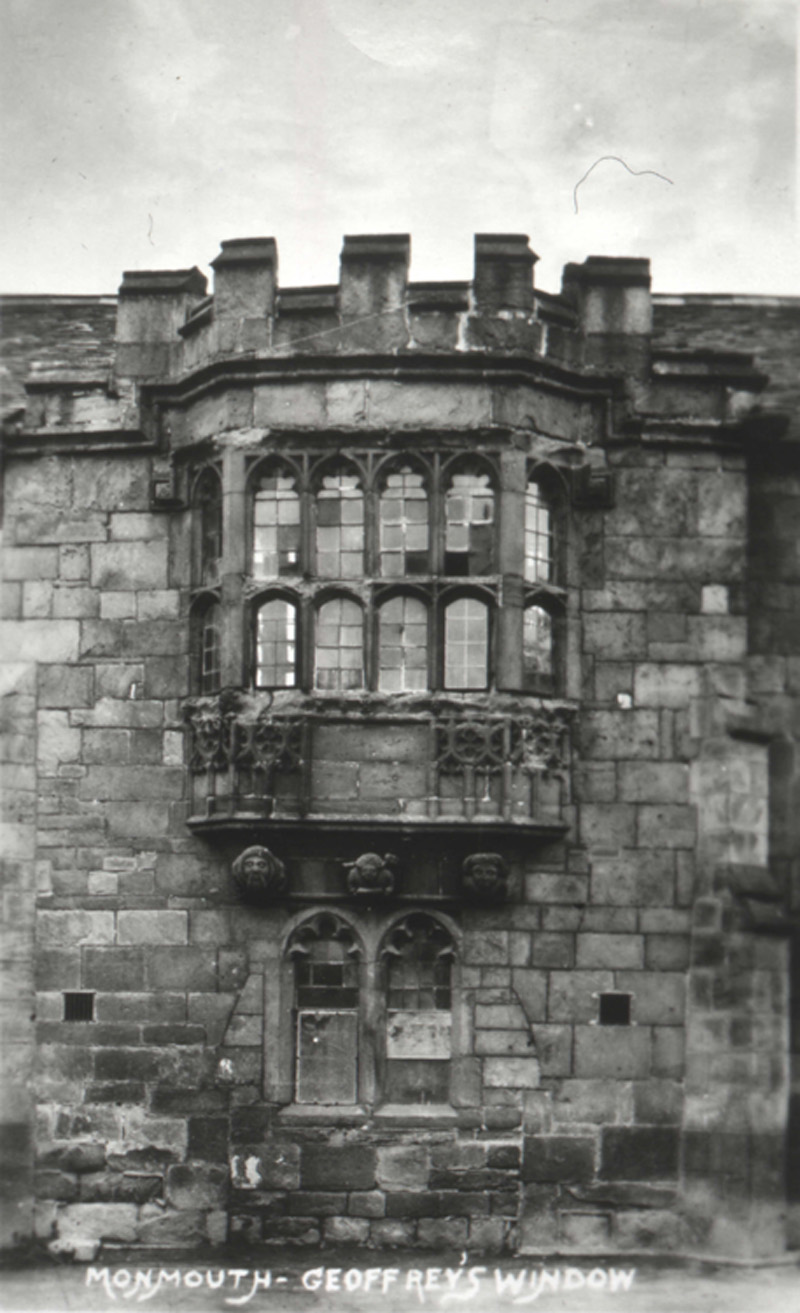
View of the window of "Geoffrey of Monmouth's Study" (in fact built well after his time).

The monastic buildings were located on the north side of the priory church. Traces of an infirmary were discovered in 1906, when the site of the Baptist Church was being prepared for building. The surviving buildings were the prior's lodgings. The only recognisable surviving medieval feature is the "sumptuous mid-C15 oriel window" which is often erroneously described as having a connection with Geoffrey of Monmouth who lived over three centuries earlier, and which in fact is likely to have formed part of the priory gatehouse. The window contains three corbels in the form of carved heads of high quality, although there is some uncertainty as to exactly what they depict: Newman describing them as representing "an angel between a civilian and what may be a bedesman", whilst Kissack is more empathic in suggesting they portray "a knight, an angel and a miller." The prior's lodgings were extended on several occasions in the nineteenth century when they were used as St Mary's National School.

The building was restored with the help of funding from the Heritage Lottery Fund. Architect Keith Murray was commissioned to draw up plans for the renovation of the building, which was completed in 2002. It is now available for community use for events such as weddings, conferences and exhibitions. The Priory is a Grade II* listed building.

== The Geoffrey Tapestry ==
In December 2000 it was suggested that a wallhanging might be produced to illustrate the life of Geoffrey of Monmouth. Research, design and preparation took six months and the first stitches were worked in July 2001, at the festivities to celebrate the Priory's 900th anniversary. The work, measuring 1.5 metres (4.9 ft) by 1.6 metres (5.2 ft), was completed in May 2003, after a combined effort by the 14 volunteers of 2,750 hours.

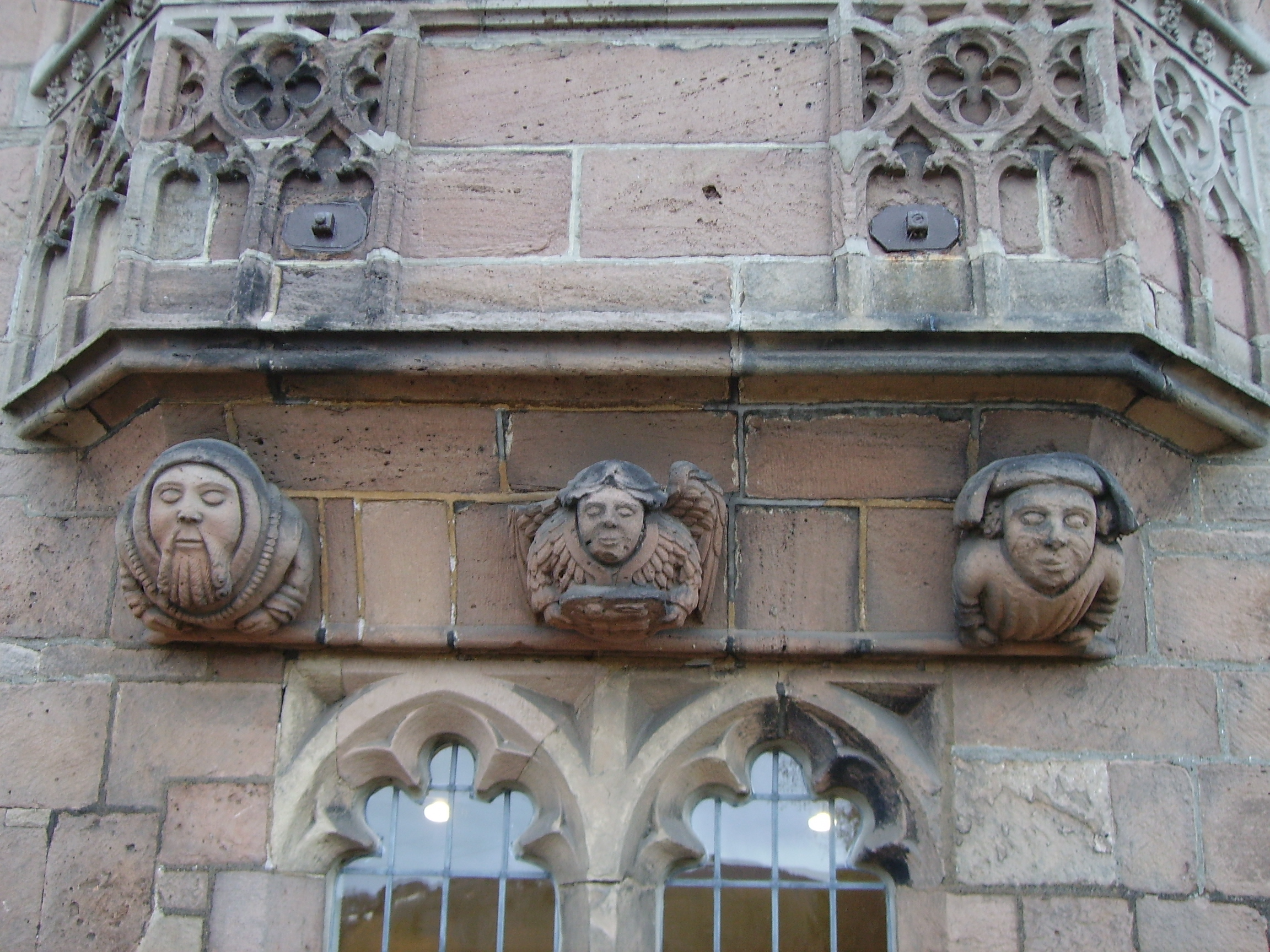
Corbels below "Geoffrey's Window"
