= Withenoc =

Lord of Monmouth

- Born: c 1035? possibly La Boussac, Brittany
- Died: after 1101 possibly Saumur
- Other names: Guihenoc; Wihenoc; Gwethenoc; Withenock; etc.
- Occupations: Nobleman; Monk
- Known for: Lord of Monmouth 1075-1082

Withenoc or Guihenoc de La Boussac (also spelled in other ways, including Wihenoc, Gwethenoc and Withenock) (c. 1035 – after 1101) was a nobleman and monk of Breton origin, who was lord of Monmouth between 1075 and 1082 and was responsible for founding Monmouth Priory.

== Life ==
Withenoc was the son of Caradoc de La Boussac, a nobleman with estates near Dol in Brittany. He first appears in the records as an adult in 1055. He married a daughter of the Archbishop of Dol, and had a younger brother, Baderon, and a son, Ratier (or Raterius), who both became monks.

Following the Norman Conquest of England in 1066, William fitzOsbern was appointed Earl of Hereford, and established the first castle at Monmouth, overlooking the rivers Wye and Monnow at the southernmost tip of the area then known as Archenfield in the Welsh Marches. William fitzOsbern was killed in battle in 1071, and his son Roger was disgraced in 1075. King William then gave the lordship of Monmouth to Withenoc. It has been suggested that Bretons who supported the Normans in their conquest were given responsibility for areas in the borders of Wales because, at that time, the two Brythonic languages of Breton and Welsh were sufficiently mutually comprehensible to allow communication with the Welsh people to take place.

One of Withenoc's first acts at Monmouth was to found a Benedictine priory in the town. In so doing, he called upon William of Dol - perhaps a relative - who had been appointed in 1070 as abbot of the Abbey of Saint-Florent de Saumur. This was a great abbey on the banks of the Loire, which was destroyed in the sixteenth century. William sent a prior and monks to inaugurate the new priory at Monmouth, and, in turn, the priory and its endowments were granted to the abbey of Saint Florent. This arrangement continued until the fourteenth century, with the priors of Monmouth coming from Saumur, and part of its revenue, as an alien priory, being sent back to France. The founding charter of the priory has been transliterated as follows:

"Wihenoc de Monmouth, to all men, his friends and neighbours, to all the faithful sons of the holy mother church, as well present as future, wishes health. Be it known unto you that I, Wihenoc, being moved by divine impulse, the advice of God, and my soldiers and vassals requiring that from me, for the honour of God, and the holy Virgin at St. Florentius, for the health of my soul, and my parents, have built a church in my castle of Monmouth, and have granted it for ever to St. Florentius de Salmure, from whence I have invited monks to inhabit the said church; and that there they may live, regularly serving God, I have granted unto them certain possessions, as well in lands as in churches and tenths, viz. the church of St. Cadoc near my castle, in my manor, where first the aforesaid monks, before the church of Monmouth was finished, some time inhabited: the church of St. Wingatoll; the church of Bockeville, the church of Llangradoc, the church of Welch Bicknor, the church of Eililde Hopa (Long Hope), with the chapel of Hently, the church of Toberton, the church of Stretton, with the chapel of Hasperton, and three carucates of land near the castle of Monmouth, and one carucate in Llancadock, and one carucate in Suentona, and two parts of all the tythes of my manor, as well as in my own possessions, as in the possession of my vassals, and the tenths of all mills, and the tenths of all my taxes. I confirm these donations under my present writing, to be by them to be possessed for ever. Witness my brother Baderon, &c."

After about seven years at Monmouth, Withenoc gave up his secular responsibilities in 1082 and retired, as a monk, to the abbey at Saumur. He was succeeded as lord of Monmouth by his brother's son, William fitzBaderon. Withenoc returned to visit Monmouth in 1101, when the priory which he had established was formally consecrated. It has been suggested that he may have been related to Geoffrey of Monmouth, who was born in the town in about 1100, the son of another Breton nobleman, Arthur, but there is no confirmation of this.
