= La Boussac =

La Boussac Labóczac (Gallo) Labouseg (Breton)
- Commune
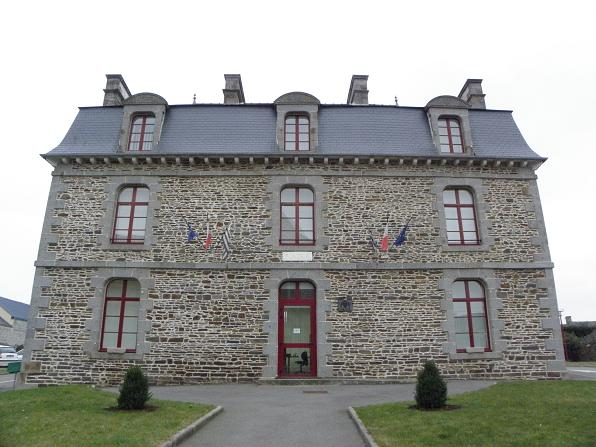
- Town hall

- Coat of arms
- Location of La Boussac
- Location within France Location within Brittany
- Coordinates: 48°30′49″N 1°39′33″W
- Country: France
- Region: Brittany
- Department: Ille-et-Vilaine
- Arrondissement: Saint-Malo
- Canton: Dol-de-Bretagne
- Intercommunality: Pays de Dol et Baie du Mont Saint-Michel

Government
  - Mayor (2020–2026): Christine Fauvel
- Area^{1}: 21.93 km^{2} (8.47 sq mi)
- Highest elevation: 108 m (354 ft)
- Lowest elevation: 18 m (59 ft)
- Population (2023): 1,271
  - Density: 57.96/km^{2} (150.1/sq mi)
- Time zone: UTC+01:00 (CET)
  - Summer (DST): UTC+02:00 (CEST)
- INSEE/Postal code: 35034 /35120
- ^{1} French Land Register data, which excludes lakes, ponds, glaciers > 1 km^{2} (0.386 sq mi or 247 acres) and river estuaries.

La Boussac (French pronunciation: [la busak]; Breton: Labouseg; Gallo: Labóczac) is a commune in the Ille-et-Vilaine department in Brittany in northwestern France.

== Population ==
Historical population
Year	Pop.	±% p.a.
1968	1,152	—
1975	964	−2.51%
1982	937	−0.41%
1990	909	−0.38%
1999	973	+0.76%
2007	1,110	+1.66%
2012	1,146	+0.64%
2017	1,181	+0.60%
2023	1,271	+1.23%
Source: INSEE

Inhabitants of La Boussac are called Boussacquais in French.

== See also ==
- Communes of the Ille-et-Vilaine department
