= Tarrington =

Village in Herefordshire, England

Coordinates: 52.06°N 02.56°W

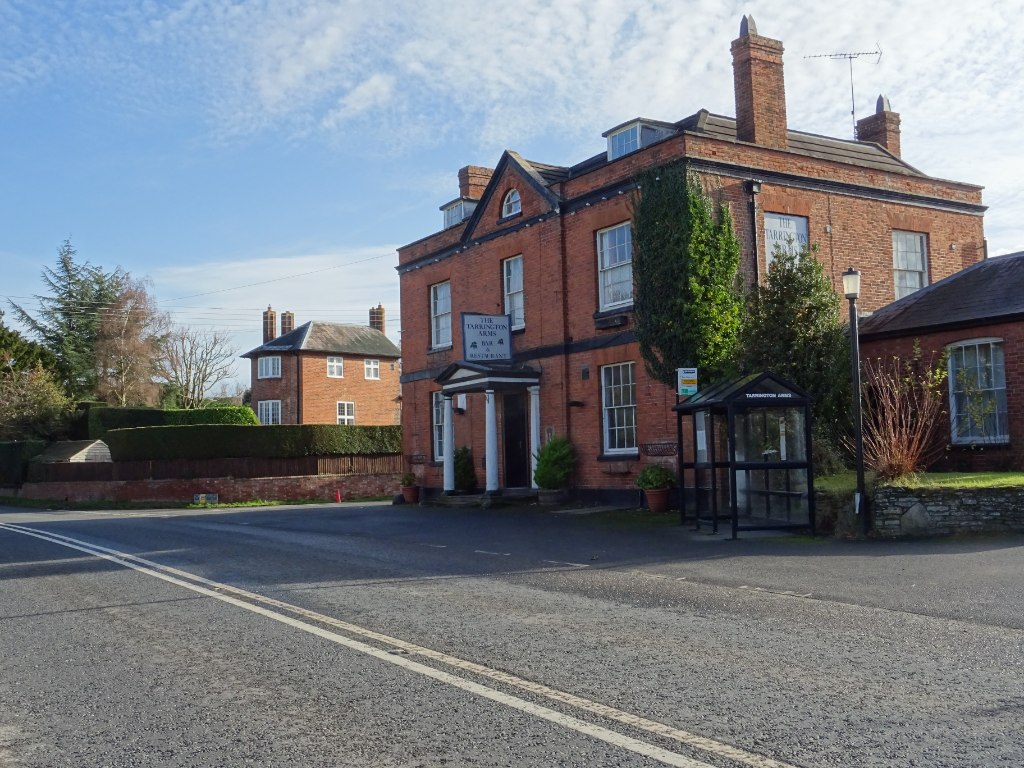
- The Tarrington Arms

- Location within Herefordshire
- Population: 576 (2011)
- OS grid reference: SO6140
- Shire county: Herefordshire
- Region: West Midlands
- Country: England
- Sovereign state: United Kingdom
- Post town: Hereford
- Postcode district: HR1
- Police: West Mercia
- Fire: Hereford and Worcester
- Ambulance: West Midlands

Tarrington is a small village in Herefordshire, England located halfway between Ledbury and Hereford on the A438 road.

== The village ==
The village has approximately 225 residences and a population, according to the 2001 census, of 506.

== History ==
=== Domesday ===
The Domesday Book of 1086, contains the earliest written record of Tarrington, where it is recorded as Tatintune, or Tatintyne. At this time, the manor of Tarrington was held by Roger de Laci, and under him by Ansfrid de Cormeilles, who came to England with William the Conqueror.

=== Norman connections ===
Through marriage to a niece of the de Lacy family, Ansfrid gained 20 manors in Herefordshire and Gloucestershire, including Tarrington. The manor of Stoke Edith, which included parts of Little Tarrington, was given to Ralph de Todeni, William's standard bearer at the Battle of Hastings.

In 1350, the manor of Tarrington was owned by Edmund de la Barre, from whom the name "Barrs Court" derives. The manor then passed through the Bodenham family to the Lingens, who also owned the manor of Stoke Edith.

=== English Civil War ===
Henry Lingen, a Catholic, became a Royalist Colonel in the English Civil War, and was knighted by Charles I in 1645. The following year, Sir Henry made a heroic, though unsuccessful, defence of Goodrich Castle against the Roundheads, and as a result, the Stoke Edith Estate, which now included large parts of Tarrington, was heavily fined and effectively confiscated by the Commonwealth Government under Oliver Cromwell. It was returned to the family at the restoration of Charles II in 1660. Henry Lingen later became Member of Parliament for Herefordshire in 1661, but died of smallpox the following year.

=== Ironmasters ===
In 1670, Thomas Foley (1616-1677), a highly successful ironmaster from Stourbridge, bought the Stoke Edith Estate. The Foley family had benefited from the Civil War by supplying charcoal and iron needed for making cannon to the Roundheads, and, later, to the Restoration Government. Thomas Foley's son, Paul, built a new house on the Estate and continued to expand it into Tarrington, he became Speaker of the House of Commons in 1694.

=== 19th century ===
According to the 1851 census, the population of Tarrington was 534, including 11 farmers, 2 masons, 2 wheelwrights, a blacksmith, a Cooper, 2 shoemakers, a builder, a rate-collector, a plumber and glazier, a butcher, 2 shopkeepers, a publican, a schoolmaster and schoolmistress, a doctor and the vicar.

Charles Mason, Steward to Lady Emily Foley, lived at The Vine, and William Wallace, her Bailiff, lived at The Lays.

=== 20th century ===
In 1919, due to the depression in farming and the agricultural economy, parts of the Stoke Edith Estate in Tarrington and the surrounding parishes were auctioned at the Green Dragon Hotel in Hereford. The auction included the Foley Arms, Tarrington House, Tan House Farm, Free Town and many other farms and cottages. In all, 3,370 acres (1,364 hectares) of land in Tarrington and beyond were made available and passed back into individual ownership. However, a substantial part of the estate was retained by the family.
