= Pixley, Herefordshire =

Village in Herefordshire, England

Coordinates: 52.047°N 2.497°W

Pixley
- St Andrew's Church

- Location within Herefordshire
- Population: 258 (2011 Census)
- Unitary authority: Herefordshire
- Shire county: Herefordshire
- Region: West Midlands
- Country: England
- Sovereign state: United Kingdom
- Post town: Ledbury
- Postcode district: HR8
- Police: West Mercia
- Fire: Hereford and Worcester
- Ambulance: West Midlands
- UK Parliament: North Herefordshire

Pixley is a village and civil parish in Herefordshire, England. The population of the civil parish at the 2011 census was 258.

The village consists of residential communities at Poolend and along the Putley road. There is a church, St Andrew's, The Trumpet Pub, a thriving garage, tea rooms, a golf course complex and a farming community. Pixley Berries is a juice ingredient supplier to bottlers, packers and brand owners throughout the UK and also for export. There is a local news publication the "Cider Press".

The surrounding lanes and land are peaceful and not heavily travelled by heavy goods vehicles, there are no industrial estates.

No Pixley family member currently lives in Pixley or Herefordshire. William Pixley left during the Catholic Emancipation.
