= List of monastic houses in County Meath =

The smaller establishments such as monastic cells and notable monastic granges (particularly those with resident monks) and camerae of the military orders of monks (Knights Templars and Knights Hospitallers) are included. The numerous monastic hospitals per se are not included here unless at some time the foundation had, or was purported to have, the status or function of an abbey, priory, or preceptory/commandery.

== Layout ==
Communities/provenance: shows the status and communities existing at each establishment, together with such dates as have been established as well as the fate of the establishment after dissolution, and the current status of the site.

Formal name or dedication: shows the formal name of the establishment or the person in whose name the church is dedicated, where known.

Alternative names: some of the establishments have had alternative names over the course of time. In order to assist in text-searching such alternatives in name or spelling have been provided.

== Abbreviations and key ==
The sites listed are ruins or fragmentary remains unless indicated thus:
*	current monastic function
+	current non-monastic ecclesiastic function
^	current non-ecclesiastic function
=	remains incorporated into later structure
#	no identifiable trace of the monastic foundation remains
~	exact site of monastic foundation unknown
ø	possibly no such monastic foundation at location
¤	no such monastic foundation
≈	identification ambiguous or confused

Locations with names in italics indicate probable duplication (misidentification with another location) or non-existent foundations (either erroneous reference or proposed foundation never implemented).

Trusteeship denoted as follows:
NIEA	Scheduled Monument (NI)
NM	National Monument (ROI)
C.I.	Church of Ireland
R.C.	Roman Catholic Church

Foundation	Image	Communities & provenance	Formal name or dedication & alternative names	References & location
Ardbraccan Monastery		early monastic site	Arda-Breaain	53°39′28″N 6°44′49″W
Ardsallagh Monastery		early monastic site	Ard-Brendomnaich; Airdleac; Eascair-Branain	53°35′38″N 6°41′07″W
Argetbor Monastery		early monastic site, Patrician monks		
Athboy Friary ^{=+}		Carmelite Friars founded 1317, license to grant land granted 17 October 1317; dissolved 1539; occupied by farmer Thomas Casey 1540; not in the list of restored convents c.1737; site now occupied by C.I. parish church	Athbuidhe; Aboy; Beallabuy	53°37′18″N 6°55′05″W
Ballyboggan Priory		Augustinian Canons Regular founded before 1200?, supposedly by Jordan Comin; dissolved 1537, surrendered by Prior Thomas Bermingham 15 October 1537; church found to be parochial by 1540; granted to Sir William Bermingham, Baron of Carbrie, 1541	Thoe Holy Trinity ____________________; Baile-ua-bhogain; Balibagan; de Laude Dei	53°24′36″N 7°02′38″W
Bective Abbey		Cistercian monks — from Mellifont founded 1147 by Murchad O Melaghlin, King of Meath, colonized 14 January 1147; dissolved 6 May 1536; held by John Alen, Lord Chancellor; granted to Andrew Wyse, vice-treasurer c.1552; Alexander Fitton also given as grantee; Bartholomew Dillon given as assignee; (Note: Harris's Table. Ware-Harris, Antiquities, 1745) (NM)	Beatidudo Dei; Becco Dei; Bectiffe; Brime; Lie-trede	53°34′57″N 6°42′10″W
Beybeg Cell		Cistercian monks — from Beaubec, France founded before 1216, manor granted by Walter de Lacy to the monks of St Mary and St Laurence de Bellow Becco, confirmed by Henry III; mistaken reference to Benedictines; (Note: James Ware, De Hibernia, et Antiquitatibus ejus, 1654 edition) dissolved 1332, granted to Furness by license 1332; granted to Thomas Cusak 1560 Beaubec; Bebeke; de Bello Loco	53°41′42″N 6°19′34″W (approx)	
Calliaghstown Priory		Augustinian nuns — Arroasian — from Duleek? dependent on Clonard-Odder; founded after 1195?, church confirmed to the nuns of Clonard 1195; church possibly shared by canons and canonesses possibly from c.1144 (in the time of St Malachy); dissolved before 1500?, probably abandoned before 1500	St Mary ____________________; Callystown	53°40′04″N 6°21′00″W
Castlekeeran Monastery		early monastic site, founded 8th century by St Ciaran; plundered by Norsmen 949; burned by MacMurrough 1170	Caislen-Ciaran; Belach-duin	53°44′27″N 6°57′15″W
Clonard Abbey		early monastic site, founded c.520 by St Finnian; diocesan cathedral 1111; translated to Trim 1202; Augustinian Canons Regular — Arroasian founded before 1146 (probably 1144); dissolved 1202?;	St Peter	53°27′03″N 7°00′26″W
Clonard Abbey		Augustinian Canonesses — Arroasian founded 1144 by Murchad O'Melaghlin, ruler of Meath, at the instance of St Malachy; cell, dependent on Odder from before 1384; dissolved before 1535?, possibly abandoned before 1535; leased to Gerald FitzGerald 1540	St Mary ____________________; Cluain-Iraird	
Clonard Priory		Augustinian Canons Regular — probably from St Thomas's, Dublin founded c.1183 (between 1183 and 1186) by Hugh de Lacy; cathedral priory; dissolved 1202?	St John	
Clonard Abbey		Augustinian Canons Regular founded 1202?, St Peter's Abbey and St John's Priory united; dissolved 1540	SS Peter and John	
Clonguffin Monastery		early monastic site, nuns, founded before 760 by St Fintana?	Cluain-cuibhtin; Cluain-cuifthin	53°26′54″N 6°54′25″W (approx)
Collumbus Monastery ^{≈}		early monastic site possibly located in County Meath		
Colp Cell		Augustinian Canons Regular — Arroasian dependent on Llanthony Prima; founded after 1183? by Hugh de Lacy; dissolved 1540; granted to Henry Draycott 1559	Colps; Culpe	53°42′24″N 6°17′42″W
Courtown Friary		Franciscan Friars (Note: A. Cogan, The Diocese of Meath 1862-70, i, pp.211-2)		
Dall Bronig Monastery ^{~}		early monastic site, founded 5th century? (Note: J. Ryan, S.J., Irish Monasticism, Origins and Development, 1931, p.78 gives a bishop at Dall Bronig in the time of St Patrick)		
Disert-moholmoc Monastery ^{~≈}		early monastic site, possibly located in County Meath	possibly Staholmog, infra	
Diore-mac-Aidmecain Monastery ^{~}		early monastic site, nuns, founded 6th century (in the time of St Finnian of Clonard)	St Lassara the virgin ____________________; Dairemacnaidmecain	
Donacarney Monastery		nuns, ruins purportedly a nunnery (Note: Mervyn Archdall, Monasticon Hibernicum, 1786, p.529)	Domnach-cairne; Donnygarney	
Donaghmore Monastery		early monastic site, founded 5th century by St Patrick for Cruimthir Cassan (St Cassanus), reputedly Patrick's first foundation in Ireland; erenaghs up to late 11th century; church became parochial after 1171; remains of later church and round tower on site	Domnach-mor-maige-echnach; Domnach-torten; Bile-torten	53°40′13″N 6°39′43″W
Donaghpatrick Monastery		early monastic site, founded 5th century by St Patrick, land granted by Conall mac Niall; burned 750; raided a number of times by the Norsemen; plundered by Dermot MacMurrough 1156; church became parochial after 1171; site now occupied by St Patrick's C.I. church	Domnach-patraice; Donogh-patrick	53°41′47″N 6°45′36″W
Donaghseery Monastery ^{~}		early monastic site, founded 5th century (in the time of St Patrick)	Domnach-sairigi	
Donor Friary, ^{~} Killaconnigan parish		Dominican Friars founded by 1636		
Druim-corcortri Monastery		early monastic site, founded 5th century by St Patrick for Diarmait		
Druimfinchoil Monastery ^{~}		early monastic site, founded by Columb and Lugad		
Druimmacubla Monastery ^{~}		early monastic site, founded 5th century (in the time of St Patrick)?	Druim-maccu-blai	
Dulane Monastery		early monastic site, founded 5th century?; plundered by the Norsemen 886; plundered by MacMurrough and his knights 1170; church became parochial after 1171	Tuilean; Tuileim; Tulleean	53°45′13″N 6°52′42″W
Duleek Monastery		early monastic site, founded before 489 by St Cianan; diocesan cathedral 1111; merged to Meath after 1152?	Dam-liac; Doimliag	
Duleek, St Mary's Abbey ^{=+}		Augustinian Canons Regular — Arroasian priory founded after 1140 by O'Kelly, probably Muircertach O'Kelly, King of Bregha; probably double monastery Augustinian Canons Regular and nuns — Arroasian dependent on Clonard; founded after 1144; church confirmed to the nuns of Clonard 1195; dissolved after 1195, nuns probably transferred to Calliaghstown; raised to abbey status c.1290; dissolved 1537; granted to Edward Becke for 21 years 28 January 1548; lease passed to John Parker 1564; remains incorporatated into C.I. parish church built on site	Dam-liac; Doimliag	53°39′19″N 6°25′08″W
Duleek, St Michael's Priory		Augustinian Canons Regular dependent on Llanthony Secunda; founded c. 1180 by Hugh de Lacy; dissolved before 1538?; rented by Thomas Cusak and others	St Michael ____________________; Cell of St Cianan	53°39′12″N 6°25′06″W
Duleek Hospitallers		Knights Hospitaller frankhouse		
Dunboyne Cell		Augustinian Canons Regular dependent on Mullingar; founded after 1230?; dissolved after 1350	Dun-buinne	53°25′09″N 6°28′41″W (approx)
Dunshaughlin Monastery		early monastic site, founded 5th century by Senchall (St Secundus)	Domnach-sechnaill	53°30′52″N 6°32′21″W
Emlagh Monastery		early monastic site, probably founded by a St Beccan (though not Beccan of Cluiain-ard); church becoming parochial after 1171	Imleach-Beccain; Imblech-fia	53°45′07″N 6°48′26″W
Feart-Cearbain Monastery ^{~}		early monastic site	Ferta-cerbain; Ferta-cherpain	
Fennor Monastery		early monastic site, founded by St Nectan?	Finnabair-abha; Finnabrach	53°42′02″N 6°32′22″W
Gormanston Friary *		Franciscan Friars; founded 1947; opened as a secondary school 1954; in use as a Franciscan college; extant		
Indeidnen Monastery		early monastic site, founded before 849; erenaghs into 11th century	Indenen; Inan	53°30′06″N 7°02′10″W (approx)
Inishmot Monastery		early monastic site, founded 6th century by St Mochta	Inis-mochta	53°50′52″N 6°36′24″W (approx)
Kells Monastery		early monastic site purportedly founded 6th century by St Colmcille — evidence lacking founded by c.804; diocesan cathedral 1152; merged with Meath c.1211; becoming a parochial church secular college, perpetual chantry in the church; dissolved 1549		53°43′38″N 6°52′46″W
Kells Abbey		Augustinian Canons Regular — Arroasian founded after 1140 (1140-8), at the instance of St Malachy; Augustinian nuns — Arroasian founded after 1144, confirmed to the nuns of Clonard; (possibly a double monastery) nuns probably transferred to Calliaghstown 1195; destroyed by the Anglo-Normans 1176, who proceeded to build a castle, destroyed later that year; apparently refounded by Hugh de Lacy; dissolved 11 November 1539, surrendered by Abbot Richard Plunkett; granted to Sir Gerald Fleminge 1541	St Mary _____________________; Ceanannus-mor; Cenandas; Kenan; kenlis	53°43′39″N 6°52′47″W
Kells Priory ^{≈}		purported Knights Hospitaller — probable confusion with Crutched Friars' house (see immediately below)	St John	
Kells Priory Hospital		Crutched Friars founded before 1199 (during the reign of Richard I) by Walter de Lacy, Lord of Meath; (erroneously attributed as Trinitarians) dissolved 1539; granted to Richard Slayne 1566	St John the Baptist	
Kilbrew Monastery		early monastic site, founded by 7th century; possibly dissolved after 1018 when many were slain	Cell-fobrich; Cell-foirbrich	53°32′41″N 6°27′40″W
Kilbride Priory		Augustinian nuns — Arroasian priory? dependent on Trim; founded after 1144, confirmed to nuns of Clonard 1195; probably dissolved sometime after 1310	St Brigid ____________________; Trim, St Brigid	53°36′02″N 6°49′16″W
Kildalkey Monastery		early monastic site, founded by St Mo-Luog; burned 779; extant 888	Cell-deilge; Cell-delga	53°34′36″N 6°54′22″W (?)
Kilglin Monastery		early monastic site, founded 5th century by St Patrick; extant 842	Celldumagluinn; Kildumhagloinn	53°25′07″N 6°41′48″W (approx)
Killabban Monastery ^{~}		early monastic site founded 6th century by St Abban	Cell-abbain	
Killaconnigan Friary ^{≈}		Dominican Friars?	possibly Donore (supra)	
Killaine Monastery ^{~}		early monastic site, nuns; founded by St Enda for his sister Fanchea	Cell-aine	53°44′59″N 6°30′28″W (approx possible)
Killalga Monastery ^{~}		early monastic site, supposedly located in County Meath (Note: Mervyn Archdall, Monasticon Hibernicum, 1786, p.399 gives Killalga as County Offaly)	Cell-elge; Cell-elga	
Kilmainhambeg Preceptory		Knights Hospitaller founded before 1199 (during the reign of Richard I) by Walter de Lacy, Lord of Meath; dissolved 1499; ruinous by 1588; leased to Sir Patrick Barnewell (renewed 1585 and 1590)	Kilmaynanbeg	53°42′35″N 6°50′25″W (approx)
Kilmainham Wood Preceptory		Knights Hospitaller purportedly founded after 1212 by the Prestons; probably farmed out 14th century; dissolved before 1500?; lease granted to Callough O'More	Kilmainhamwood Commandery; Kylmaynanwood; Kilmaynanwood	53°51′05″N 6°48′38″W (?)
Kilmoon Monastery		early monastic site, probably founded 6th century (in the time of St Brendan of Clonfert) by St Moinne (Munni), a Briton; extant 885	St Moinne ___________________; Cell-monai; Cell-moinne	53°34′11″N 6°27′30″W
Kilshine Monastery		early monastic site, nuns founded before 597? by St Abban for St Segnich (Sinchea)	Cell-ailbe; Cell-sinche; Techsinche	53°45′02″N 6°44′02″W
Kilskeer Monastery		early monastic site, monks and nuns?; possible double monastery; founded 6th century (in the time of St Colmcille) by Schiria; possibly monks only from 8th century	Cell-scire; Killskyre	53°41′28″N 6°59′51″W
Leckno Monastery		early monastic site, founded by 750	Lecknagh; Leckne; possibly Piercetown	53°35′09″N 6°26′27″W
Lismullin Priory		Augustinian nuns founded c.1240 by Avicia de la Corner (Avice de Lacortier, widow), sister of Richard, Bishop of Meath, who granted the church and manors; dissolved 1539; granted to Sir Thomas Cusack 1547	The Holy Trinity ____________________; Las-mullen; Les-mullen; Lois-mullen; Kilmullan	53°35′46″N 6°35′00″W (?)
Lough Sheelin Monastery		early monastic site, founded possibly 6th century by St Carthag, bishop	Inisvachtuir; Inisuachtair; Church Island	53°48′10″N 7°19′39″W
Lough Sheelin Friary		Friars, possible place of refuge during the reign of Queen Elizabeth		53°48′07″N 7°19′36″W (approx)?
Mornington Monastery		early monastic site, founded 6th century by St Colmcille	Baile-mernain; Villa Maris; Marinerstown	53°43′18″N 6°16′59″W (?)
Navan Abbey		Augustinian Canons Regular — Arroasian founded before 1170?, probably on site of earlier monastery (see immediately below), church confirmed to the canons by John de Courcy; surrendered 19 July 1538 by Abbot Thomas Waffe; dissolved 1539; church in parochial use by 1540; occupancy by John Brokes 1540-1	St Mary ____________________; An Uaim; Nuachongbail; Novbain; Uaim	53°39′21″N 6°41′13″W
Navan Monastery		early monastic site, founded 6th century; Augustinian Canons house probably founded on site (see immediately above)	St Mary ____________________; An Uaim; Nuachongbail; Novbain; Uaim	53°39′21″N 6°41′13″W
Newtown Trim Cathedral Priory		Augustinian Canons Regular — Victorine — possibly from St Thomas's Abbey, Dublin founded 1202 by Simon Rochfort, Bishop of Meath, who translated the see here from Clonard; dissolved 1536, suppressed 1 May 1536	SS Peter and Paul	53°33′21″N 6°46′19″W
Newtown Trim Priory Hospital		Crutched Friars founded after 1206?, possibly by the Bishop of Meath; dissolved 1539; occupier Sir Thomas Cusake 1540-2	The Priory Hospital of St John the Baptist	
Odder Priory		dedication infers early monastic site, nuns Augustinian nuns — Arroasian priory founded c.1144?, confirmed to the nuns of Clonard by Pope Celestine III 1195; raised to abbey status c.1383; dissolved 1539; church parochial by 1540; under occupancy of Nicholas Stanyhurst 1540; leased to James Stanihurst 1557	St Brigid ____________________; Odra	53°34′03″N 6°37′30″W (approx)
Oristown Monastery		early monastic site, cella founded by St Finbar of Cork, site granted by a local chieftain	Raith-airthir	53°43′32″N 6°46′44″W (?)
Piercetown Monastery ^{≈}		early monastic site	Leckno; Lecknagh; Leckne; Pyerston Laundy	53°35′09″N 6°26′27″W (?); 53°35′04″N 6°25′35″W (?)
Rathaige Monastery ^{≈}		early monastic site, possibly located in County Meath	Raithaidme	
Rath-becain Monastery ^{~}		early monastic site, founded by St Abban; possibly located in County Meath	Rathbeggan; Rathbeg	
Rathmore Abbey ^{ø}		"Abbey" (Note: Ordnance Survey, ½ inch, and Memorial Atlas of Ireland, 1901) not a monastic church, apparently parochial	Ballyboy	53°38′35″N 6°52′20″W
Rathossain Monastery		early monastic site, founded before 686 by St Ossain	Rathosain	53°26′54″N 6°54′25″W (approx)
Ratoath Abbey		Augustinian Canons Regular cell? dependent on St Thomas's Abbey, Dublin?, possibly a hospital maintained by the canons; founded before c.1300?; dissolved after 1456	St Mary Magdalene ____________________; Rath-outhe; Ratouth	53°30′30″N 6°27′37″W {?)
Russagh Monastery ^{~}		early monastic site, founded by St Caeman (Coeman) Brec	Ros-eac; Ros-each; Clonabreny	
Silverstream Priory		Benedictine Monks founded 2012 by Dom Mark Daniel Kirby	Monastery of Our Lady of the Cenacle	53°38′16″N 6°17′24″W
Skreen Monastery		early monastic site founded before late 9th century; plundered 974 and 986; plundered by the foreigners from Dublin 1037; plundered by the men of Teathbha 1058; plundered by the Ui Briuin 1152; granted to St Mary's Abbey, Dublin 1185-6	Scrin-coluim-cille; Scrinium; Shrine; Skryne; Acall; Achall	53°35′09″N 6°33′47″W
Skreen Friary ^{#}, nr. Tara		Augustinian Friars founded 1341, 99-year lease of land granted by Lord Francis de Feipo; dissolved 1539; granted to Thomas Cusack 1542; (NM)	Hill of Skreen Monastery	
Skreen Priory		Augustinian nuns — Arroasian dependent on Clonard founded after 1144; confirmed to the nuns of Clonard 1195; dissolved before 1240?, probably abandoned before the founding of Lismullin; passed to Odder late 14th century	St Mary	
Slane Monastery		early monastic site, founded by St Patrick; hermitage attributed to St Erc; plundered by the Norsemen 833; probably dissolved before 1170; plundered 1156, 1161 and 1170	Slaine; Slainge; Ferta-fer-feac	
Slane Friary		Franciscan Friars, Third Order Regular founded before 31 August 1512, license obtained by Christopher Fleming, Baron of Slane, and his wife Elizabeth Stuckly for the hermitage of St Erc to be granted in perpetuity to Franciscans Father Malachy O'Bryen and Brother Donagh O'Bryen who were resident there; dissolved 1540, before 1548; granted to Sir James Fleming 12 November 1543; granted to James, Lord of Slayne 1546; occupied by James Fleming 1548; priests and prelates continued in residency after suppression; Capuchin Franciscan Friars founded 1641; dissolved 1650; (NM)	Slaine; Slainge; Ferta-fer-feac	53°43′02″N 6°32′35″W
Staholmog Monastery		early monastic site, founded 6th century by St Colman (Note: listed in Harris's Table in Ware-Harris, Antiquities, 1745, p.264)	Disert-Moholmoc; Tech-Moholmog	53°46′32″N 6°47′30″W
Tara Monastery		early monastic site, founded before 504, possibly by St Partick for Cerpan, a convert of his, later bishop here	Fert-cherpain at Temuir	53°34′50″N 6°36′37″W (?)
Tara Hospice		Knights Hospitaller founded by 1212: church confirmed to the knights; hospice extant 1331	Cardomiston	
Teltown Monastery		early monastic site, founded before 723	Tailltui; Cell-talten; Cell-tailtean; Kiltalton	53°42′00″N 6°46′52″W
Trevet Monastery		early monastic site, founded before 563, probably by St Colmcille; burned by Donnechadh O Caroroll 1145; plundered by the Ui Briuin 1152	Treoit; Treod; Trefoit; Tryvet	53°32′29″N 6°32′20″W
Trim Abbey		early monastic site, founded 5th century by St Patrick, site granted by Feidlimid, son of Loiguire; diocesan cathedral 1202; early monastic site, nuns 407 later? Kilbride? Augustinian Canons Regular founded after 1140; probably Augustinian Canons Regular — Arroasian probably adopted 1144 at the instance of St Malachy; burned 1108 by Conor O'Melaghlin; destroyed before 1186; restored/rebuilt by de Lacy (probably Hugh de Lacy) before 1188-91; burnt 1203; dissolved 1539; granted to Sir Anthony Leger, the king's deputy, 1542; converted into a Protestant school 18th century; (NM)	The Abbey Church of Saint Mary, Trim ____________________; Talbot Castle	53°33′23″N 6°47′19″W
Trim Blackfriars		Dominican Friars founded 1263, probably by Geoffrey de Geneville, Lord of Meath, later friar and buried here, or by Hussey, Baron of Galtrim, benefactor and buried here; dissolved 1540; occupied by David Flody, farmer, 1548 friars remained in the district, acquiring a new house at Donor, supra, by 1636	St Mary	53°33′37″N 6°47′21″W
Trim Friary ^{#}		Franciscan Friars Minor, Conventual founded before 1282?, possibly by William, Rufus de Burgo or the Plunkets, hospital possibly granted to the friars; Observant Franciscan Friars reformed not later than 1506; dissolved 1540; granted to three persons 1542; occupied by John Hamond 1548; convent recommended for restoration 1544; suppressed by the Protestants and converted into a court house; abandoned until another house built 1609	St Bonavente or St Francis	
Trim Crutched Friars ^{~}	duplication of Newtown Trim Crutched Friary, supra (Note: Mervyn Archdall, Monasticon Hibernicum 1786, p.581)			
Trim Carmelite Friars		given in Rinuccini list - evidence lacking		
Tullyard Monastery ^{~}		early monastic site, collapse of round tower c.1760 (Note: E. Hogan, S.J., Goedelicum locorum et tribuum Hiberniae et Scotiae, R.I.A., 1910, p.627)	Tullaghard	
Villa Britone ^{~≈?}		given in taxation of 1302-6 — yet to be identified - foundation, order and period unknown	Villa Bruton	

== Map link to lists of monastic houses in Ireland by county ==
Click on a county to go to the corresponding article.	Antrim; Armagh; Down; Fermanagh; Londonderry; Tyrone; Carlow; Cavan; Clare; Cork; Donegal; Dublin; Galway; Kerry; Kildare; Kilkenny; Laois; Leitrim; Limerick; Longford; Louth; Mayo; Meath; Monaghan; Offaly; Roscommon; Sligo; Tipperary; Waterford; Westmeath; Wexford; Wicklow

== See also ==
- List of monastic houses in Ireland
