= Constables and Governors of Windsor Castle =

Official in charge of Windsor Castle, England

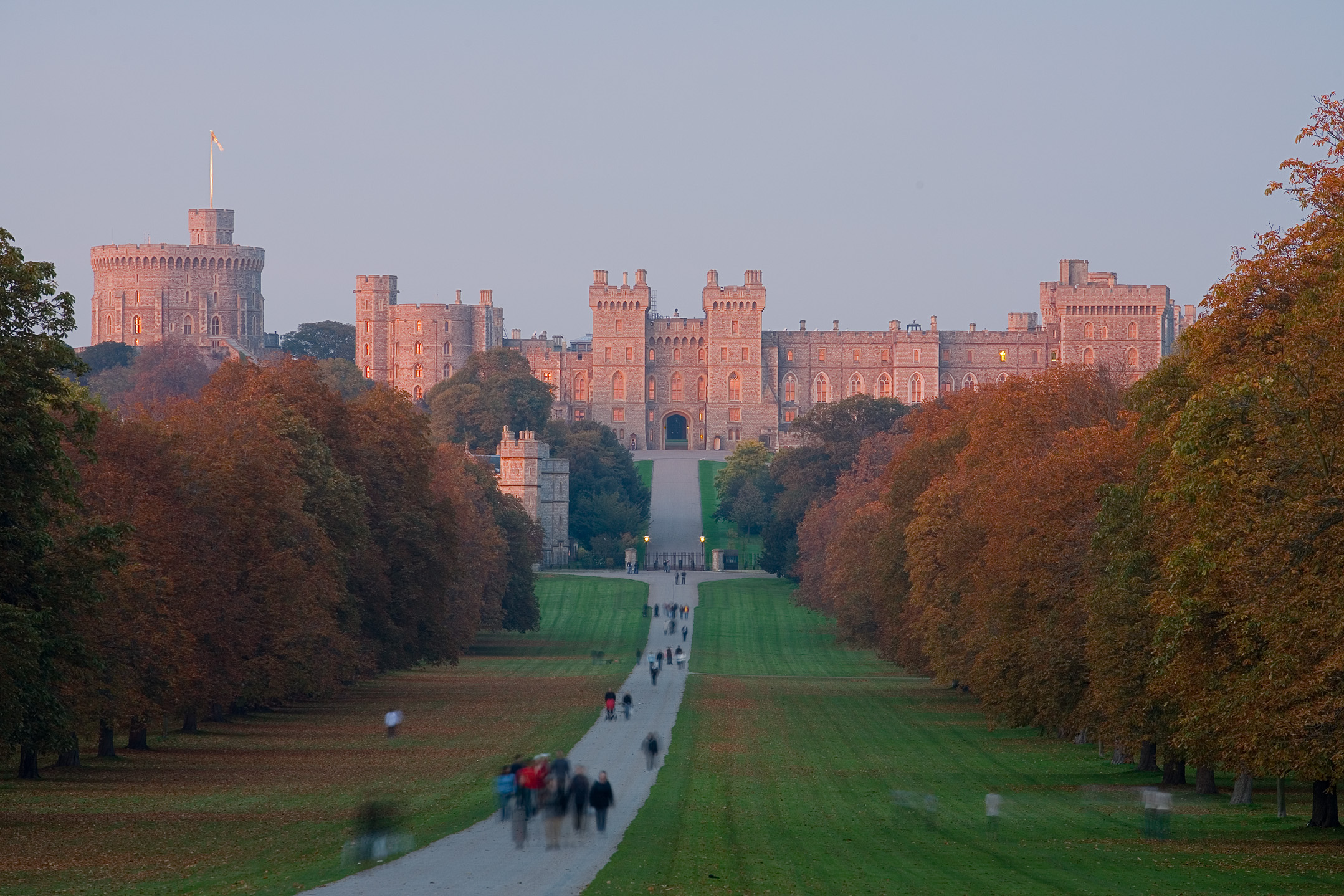
Windsor Castle

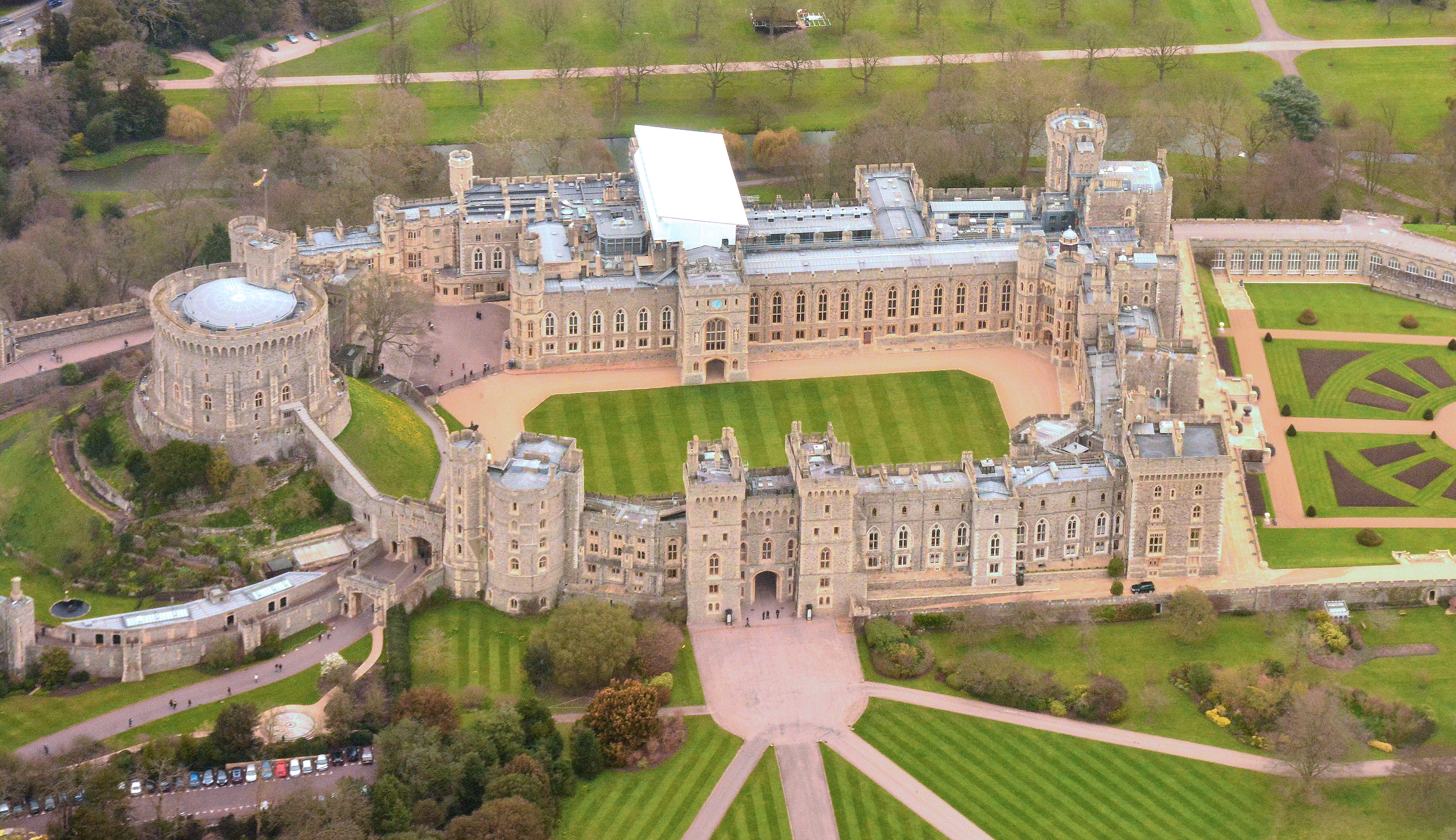
Windsor Castle, from above

The Constable and Governor of Windsor Castle is in charge of Windsor Castle in England on behalf of the sovereign. The day-to-day operations are under the Superintendent, who is an officer of the Master of the Household's Department of the Royal Household.

The Constable receives no salary, but has a residence in the Castle. From 1833 to 1957, the office was mostly filled by a member of the Royal Family, but now it is held by a senior retired officer of the armed forces of the Crown. He is the representative of the Lord Chamberlain within the Castle. The Constable also has nominal charge of its garrison, including the Windsor Castle Guard of the Foot Guards of the Household Division, as well as of the Military Knights of Windsor. Since 1668, the previously subordinate post of Governor has always been jointly held with that of Constable. A special uniform is prescribed for the Constable and Governor (similar to the full dress uniform of a General officer, but with scarlet collar and cuffs on a blue tunic rather than vice versa); alternatively (and more often than not) service uniform may be worn.

There was a Deputy Constable and Lieutenant-Governor from 1833 to 1989. From 1964, he was also Governor of the Military Knights of Windsor until the office was abolished in 1989. At one time there was also a separate Constable of the Round Tower. From 1928 to 1935 this was held jointly with the post of Deputy Constable.

The following is a list, as complete as can be compiled from sources at present available, of the castellans, keepers and constables of Windsor Castle:

== List of Constables of Windsor Castle ==
Those appointed since 1668 have been Constable and Governor of Windsor Castle.

Name	From	To	Notes
Walter FitzOther	1086	1100	
William FitzWalter de Windsor (son)	1100	c.1153	
Richard de Luci	1153	1179	
Hugh de Puiset	1190	1190	Earl of Northumberland and Bishop of Durham
William de Longchamp	1191 (seized office)	1191	Bishop of Ely and Chancellor of England
William d'Aubigny, 2nd Earl of Arundel	1191	1191	
William de Longchamp	1191 (again seized office)	1191	Bishop of Ely and Chancellor of England
Hubert Walter	1191	1193	Bishop of Salisbury then Archbishop of Canterbury
Nicholas de Kenet	1199	1200	Accounts for Windsor in Pipe Rolls 1199,1200.
Hubert de Burgh	1200	1200	
John FitzHugh	1201	1204	
Robert de Vipont	1204	1205	
John FitzHugh	1205	1216	
Engelard de Cigogné	1216	1223	
Stephen Langton	1223	1224	Archbishop of Canterbury
William de Rughedon	1224	1224	
Osbert Giffard	1224	1224	
Ralph Tirel	1224	1225	
Hubert de Burgh, 1st Earl of Kent	1226	1233	
William de Millers	1228		
Waleran Tyes	1231		
Alan de Crepping	1231		
Stephen de Segrave	1232		
Henry de Passelewe	1233		
Engelard de Cigogné	1234		
Bernard of Savoy	1242		
Pierre de Genève	1248		
Maud de Lacy	1249		widow of Peter of Geneva
Aymon Thurumbert	1257	1261	
John de Sancta Elena	1261	1263	
Sir Giles de Argentine	1263		
Drew de Barentyne	1264		
Geoffrey de Langley	1264		
John FitzJohn	1264		
John of London	1266		
Ebulo de Montibus	1266		
Nicholas de Yattendon	1269		
Hugh de Dyne	1269		
Geoffrey de Pickford	1272		
John of London	1298		
Roger le Sauvage	1305	1308	
Robert de Haustede	1308		
Warin de Lisle	1309	1319	
Oliver de Bordeaux	1319		
Ralph de Camoys, 3rd Baron Camoys	1319	1326	
Thomas de Huntercombe	1326	1327	Also known as de Hodeng of Eton and Burnham
John de Lisle	1327		
Thomas Foxley	1328	1360	Also known as de Foxle; of Foxley Manor at Bray and Bramshill Castle
Richard de la Vache	1360		
Thomas Cheney	1365		
Helming Legatte	1369		
Sir Simon de Burley	1377		
Thomas Tyle	1389		
Sir Peter Courtenay	1390		
Sir Hugh Waterton	1405		
Sir John Stanley	1408	1413	
John Wintershull	1413		deputy constable
John Waterton	1414	1417	Master of the Horse
Edmund Beaufort, 2nd Duke of Somerset	1438	1455	
Admiral William Nevill jointly with John Bourchier, 1st Baron Berners	1455		Neville: Baron Fauconberg and Earl of Kent
John Bourchier, 1st Baron Berners jointly with his son Sir Humphrey Bourchier	1466	1471	
John Bourchier, 1st Baron Berners	1471	1474	
Walter Hungerford, 1st Baron Hungerford	1474	1477	
Sir John Elrington	1483	1484	
Thomas Windsor of Stanwell	1484	1485	
Sir Thomas Bourchier	1485		
Sir Thomas Bourchier jointly with Giles Daubeney, 1st Baron Daubeney	1495		
Sir Thomas Bourchier jointly with Henry Bourchier, 2nd Earl of Essex	1511		
Henry Courtenay, 1st Marquess of Exeter	1525	1539	
Robert Dudley, 1st Earl of Leicester	1559		KG
Charles Howard, 2nd Baron Howard of Effingham	1590		later 1st Earl of Nottingham
George Villiers, 1st Duke of Buckingham	1624	1628	
Henry Rich, 1st Earl of Holland	1628	1648	
Philip Herbert, 5th Earl of Pembroke and 2nd Earl of Montgomery	1648		
Colonel John Venn	1648	1653	
Sir Bulstrode Whitelocke	1653	1657	
Colonel Sir John Lenthall	1657	1660	
John Mordaunt, 1st Viscount Mordaunt	1660	1668	
Prince Rupert of the Rhine	1668	1682	
Henry Howard, 7th Duke of Norfolk	1682	1701	
George FitzRoy, 1st Duke of Northumberland	1701	1716	
Richard Temple, 1st Viscount Cobham	1716	1723	
Charles Howard, 3rd Earl of Carlisle	1723	1730	
Charles Beauclerk, 2nd Duke of St Albans	1730	1751	
George Montagu, 1st Duke of Montagu	1752	1790	
James Brudenell, 5th Earl of Cardigan	1791	1811	
Charles Stanhope, 3rd Earl of Harrington	1812	1829	
Henry Conyngham, 1st Marquess Conyngham	1829	1832	
Major General George FitzClarence, 1st Earl of Munster	1833	1842	Son of King William IV
Prince Augustus Frederick, Duke of Sussex	1842	1843	Son of King George III, uncle of then Queen Victoria
Prince Albert of Saxe-Coburg and Gotha	1843	1861	The Prince Consort
Vice Admiral Prince Victor of Hohenlohe-Langenburg	1867	1891	
John Campbell, 9th Duke of Argyll	1892	1914	
Adolphus Cambridge, 1st Marquess of Cambridge	1914	1927	
Reginald Brett, 2nd Viscount Esher	1928	1930	
Major General Alexander Cambridge, 1st Earl of Athlone	4 Aug 1931	1957	Gazette Entry Brother-in-law of George V
vacant	1957	18 Jun 1964	Gazette Entry
Field Marshal William Slim, 1st Viscount Slim	18 Jun 1964	1970	Gazette Entry
Marshal of the Royal Air Force Charles Elworthy, Baron Elworthy	1971	11 Aug 1978	Gazette Entry
Marshal of the Royal Air Force Sir John Grandy	11 Aug 1978	9 Feb 1988	Gazette Entry
Admiral Sir David Hallifax	9 Feb 1988	1992	Gazette Entry
General Sir Patrick Palmer	1992	2000	
Air Chief Marshal Sir Richard Johns	2000	2008	
Surgeon Vice-Admiral Ian L. Jenkins	1 Feb 2008	19 Feb 2009	Died in post
Air Marshal Sir Ian Macfadyen	10 Aug 2009	2014	Court & Social
Admiral Sir James Perowne	2014	2022	
Lieutenant General Philip Jones	2022		

== List of Deputy Constables and Lieutenant-Governors of Windsor Castle ==
Please note this list is incomplete.

Name	From	To	Notes
Major General George Scott	c.1782		Deputy Governor
Major-General Sir John Clayton Cowell	1866	1894	
Reginald Brett, 2nd Viscount Esher	23 Jul 1901	19 Jan 1928	
Major Frederick Ponsonby, 1st Baron Sysonby	9 Jan 1928	20 October 1935	
Colonel Clive Wigram, 1st Baron Wigram	20 July 1936	6 April 1945	
Brigadier General Alexander Hore-Ruthven, 1st Earl of Gowrie	6 Apr 1945	1 Mar 1953	
Lieutenant General Bernard Freyberg, 1st Baron Freyberg	1 Mar 1953	4 Jul 1963	
Field Marshal William Slim, 1st Viscount Slim	5 Jul 1963	4 Sep 1964	
Major General Sir Edmund Hakewill-Smith	4 Sep 1964	31 Dec 1972	
Major General Sir Peter Gillett	1978	1989	

== Sources ==
- Ditchfield, P H; Page, William, eds. (1923). "Windsor castle: History". A History of the County of Berkshire. Vol. 3. London: Victoria County History. pp. 5–29, esp. 24 – via British History Online. Bond, Shelagh. "The Medieval Constables of Windsor Castle". The English Historical Review Vol. 82, Issue 323. 1967..pp. 229-245
