= Peter of Geneva (son of Humbert) =

Peter of Geneva or Pierre de Genève was the son of Humbert, Count of Geneva, and grandson of William I.

Humbert de Genève, had been the Count until 1220, but when he died the county did not pass to his sons Pierre and Ebal but to Humbert's younger brother Guillaume de Genève, who was now established as the Count of Geneva. The Genevois held not only the lands between Annecy and Geneva but still had lands on the north shore of Lake Geneva, as far as Lausanne – and these fertile (now inordinately expensive) lands were coveted by Peter II, Count of Savoy.

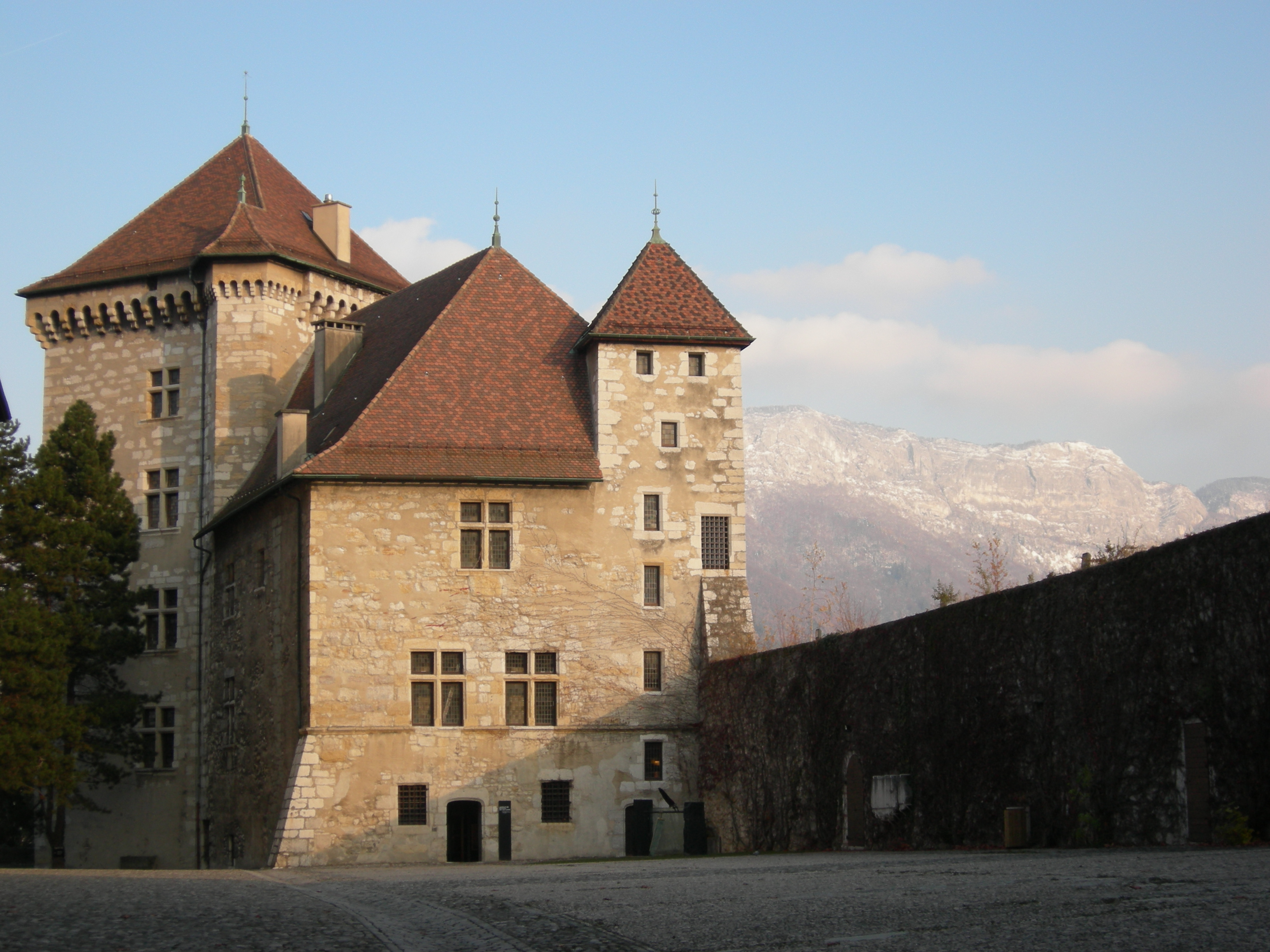
Annecy Castle

It has been suggested that either Peter II, Count of Savoy arranged for Pierre and Ebal to find preferment in England in return for their rights on the north shore of Lake Geneva or more generously that he befriended them and offered them a life in England as a good uncle to nephews in need – either way they arrived in England between 1240 and 1241 and feature in English records in the early 1240s.

Once in England they joined Peter’s staff; he was able to find Pierre de Genève a good marriage match, Maude de Lacy, youngest daughter of Gilbert de Lacy, who claimed descent from the great William Marshal. The family held the castle in the Welsh Marches at Ludlow, and for a time Pierre became Lord of Ludlow through Maude before succeeding Bernard de Savoie, becoming a Constable of Windsor Castle itself, before dying in 1249. His English bride would find another Savoyard match in Geoffroi de Joinville (known in England as Geoffrey de Geneville) the brother of Saint Louis biographer and famed chronicler of the Crusades Jean de Joinville. His brother Ebal de Genève meanwhile found a good marriage match in Ireland, Christiana de Marais, the daughter of Robert de Marais (himself a son of John's Justiciar in Ireland who received large grants of land in Munster).

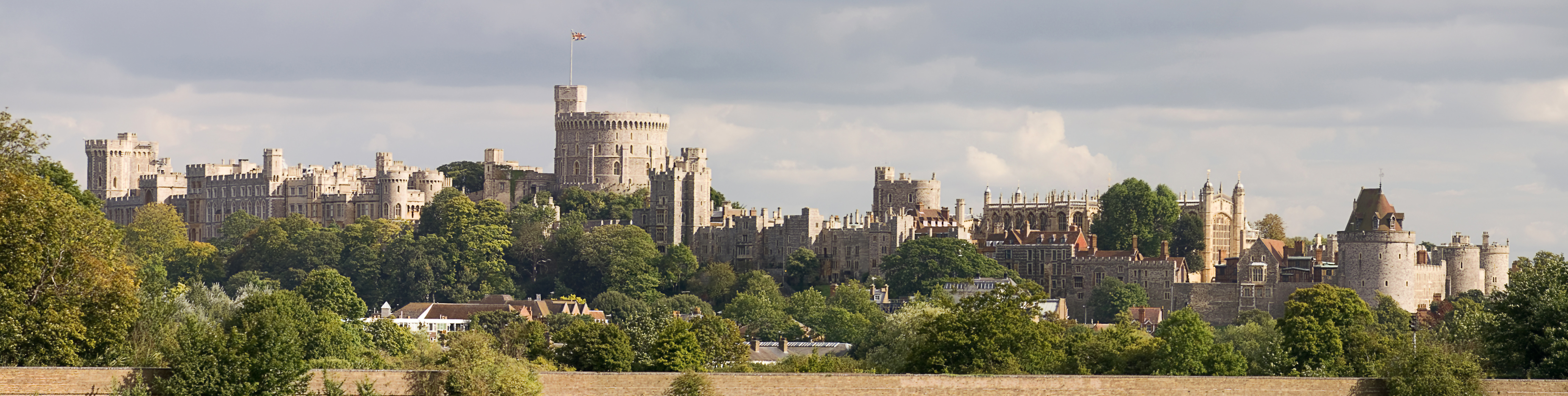
Windsor Castle, seen from the north; (l to r) Upper Ward, Middle Ward, Round Tower, St George's Chapel, Lower Ward and Curfew Tower

Henry III's grant of marriage bestowed all lands inherited by Christiana on Ebal. He would later accompany the Lord Edward in service to Gascony before leaving his entire estate to, unsurprisingly Pierre de Savoie, his benefactor.

Further supporting the Machiavellian view, are documents in the Regeste Genevois, that show the grateful Pierre and Ebal renouncing their claims in the County of Geneva, which were drawn up in London in favour of Peter II, Count of Savoy – and sealed by those other Vaudois in England or related to those therein, Gerard de Grandson (a Canon in Lyon), Ebulo de Montibus, Pierre de Champvent and Simon de Joinville. A prime facie case and good example of how Peter was able to use his position in England to gain advantage in Savoy.
