= Bernard of Savoy =

Bernard of Savoy, possibly the illegitimate son of Thomas, Count of Savoy, was constable of Windsor Castle from 1242 until 1248, when he was succeeded by fellow Savoyard Peter of Geneva. Granted the manor of Berminton in Surrey in 1244 for his service by Henry III of England. Bernard was one of the extended family of Eleanor of Provence, Henry's Queen, who were responsible for the keep and upbringing of the Lord Edward, later Edward I of England.
