= Giles de Argentine =

Giles de Argentine (died 1283–84) was a baronial leader in England. He was the son of Richard de Argentine, a justiciar in Normandy, whom he succeeded in 1247.

He acted as justice itinerant in 1253, and in 1258 was named by the barons, in the Provisions of Oxford, as one of the twelve permanent representatives of the commonalty, and one of the twenty-four 'a treter de aide le rei'. In 1263 he was made constable of Windsor, and after the battle of Lewes he appears to have been placed on the supreme council of nine, and to have been one of its three members (acting also as custodes sigilli) who were in attendance on the king and Simon de Montfort throughout the campaign of Evesham. His lands were subsequently forfeited.
