= Maud de Lacy, Baroness Geneville =

Irish-Norman noble

Maud de Lacy
- suo jure Lady of Trim suo jure Lady of Ludlow; Baroness Geneville
- Born: 1230; Dublin, Ireland
- Died: 11 April 1304 (aged 74); Trim Castle, Meath, Ireland
- Noble family: de Lacy
- Spouses: Pierre de Genève; Sir Geoffrey de Geneville, 1st Baron Geneville
- Issue: 5 (possibly more)
- Father: Gilbert de Lacy
- Mother: Isabel Bigod

Maud de Lacy, Baroness Geneville (1230 – 11 April 1304) was a Norman-Irish noblewoman and wealthy heiress who inherited half the estates of her grandfather Walter de Lacy, Lord of Meath, upon his death in 1241. The lordships of Trim and Ludlow passed to her second husband Sir Geoffrey de Geneville, 1st Baron Geneville by right of his marriage to her; although she helped to rule and administer the estates in an equal partnership. She is sometimes referred to as Matilda de Lacy.

== Family ==
Maud (otherwise Matilda) was born in Dublin, Ireland in 1230, the youngest child of Gilbert de Lacy of Ewyas Lacy and Isabel Bigod, daughter of Hugh Bigod the Earl of Norfolk and his wife Matilda (Maud), daughter of William Marshall the Earl of Pembroke. Her paternal grandparents were Walter de Lacy and Margaret de Braose, daughter of Maud de Braose, who was walled up alive by King John of England. Her maternal grandparents were Hugh Bigod, 3rd Earl of Norfolk and Maud Marshal. She had an elder brother, Walter and sister Margery. On 25 December 1230, the year of her birth, Maud's father died, leaving her mother a widow at the age of eighteen. Less than four years later on 12 April 1234, her mother married again; he was John FitzGeoffrey, Lord of Shere in Surrey, England, and Justiciar of Ireland. Maud had six younger half-siblings from her mother's second marriage to John.

In early 1241, Maud's brother Walter died. He was in his early teens. When their grandfather Walter de Lacy died shortly afterwards on 24 February, Maud and her sister, Margery inherited his vast estates and lordships in Ireland, Herefordshire, and the Welsh Marches. Maud and Margery both received a moiety of Ewyas Lacy in Herefordshire, and a share of the lordship with the taxes and revenues that attached to it.

== Marriages and issue ==
On an unknown date, Maud married her first husband Pierre de Genève, son of Humbert, Count of Genève, and a relative of Eleanor of Provence. He was one of the "Savoyards" who had arrived in England in the retinue of Queen Eleanor when she married King Henry III. The marriage produced a son and a daughter whose names were not recorded. Pierre died in 1249, and sometime before 8 August 1252, Maud married her second husband, another "Savoyard", Sir Geoffrey de Geneville, Seigneur of Vaucouleurs( c.1226- 21 October 1314), son of Simon de Joinville and Beatrix d'Auxonne. Both Maud's marriages and the marriage of her sister, Margery (Note: Margery married John de Verdun, Lord of Westmeath, by whom she had issue.) were personally arranged by King Henry III to ensure that the estates they inherited from their grandfather were retained in the hands of those known to be trusted servants of the Crown.

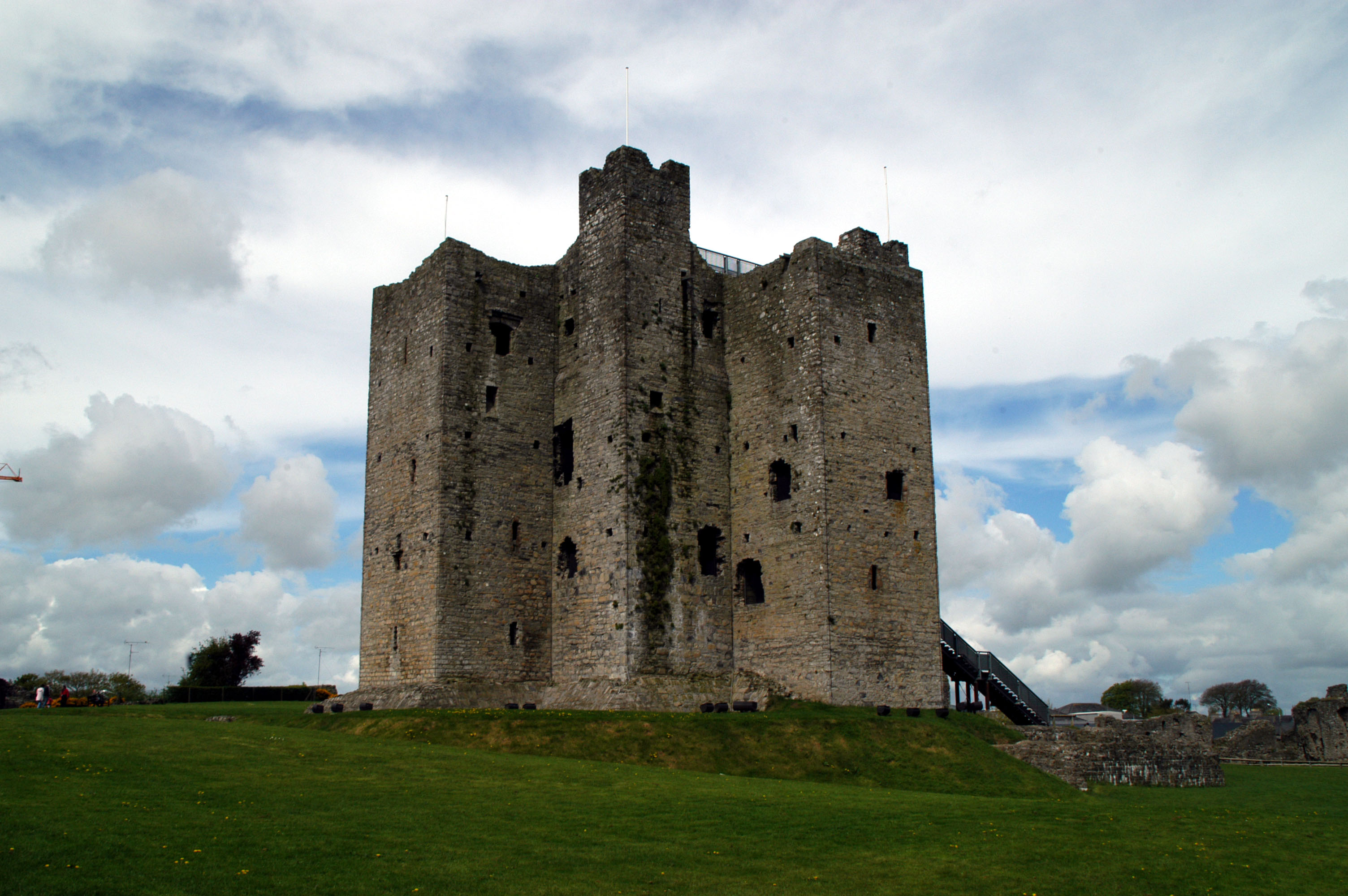
Trim Castle, Ireland, one of the lordships of Maud de Lacy

The king granted Geoffrey and Maud, and their heirs rights in the land of Meath held by her grandfather, Walter de Lacy by charter dated 8 August 1252. On 18 September 1254, the king granted them all the liberties and free customs in Meath which her grandfather had held; and they might issue their own writs in Meath according to the law and custom of Ireland. On 21 September 1252, they had livery of Trim Castle and a moiety of forty marcates of lands as the inheritance of Maud. They made Trim Castle their chief residence. Maud and Geoffrey jointly ruled and administered their estates together in an equal partnership. They later donated property to Dore Abbey.

In 1254, Maud accompanied Queen Eleanor to Gascony.

Maud's husband was a loyal supporter and favourite of Prince Edward who would in 1272 reign as King Edward I of England. Geoffrey fought with the Prince against Simon de Monfort at the Battle of Evesham, and it was at Ludlow Castle that Prince Edward was sheltered following his escape in May 1265 from Montfortian captivity. Geoffrey was appointed Justiciar of Ireland by his friend and patron, the new king, Edward I in September 1273, a post he held until June 1276; however, he had little success against the Irish of Leinster. He was summoned to Parliament by writ as 1st Baron Geneville on 6 February 1299.

Together Geoffrey and Maud had at least three children: (Note: Geoffrey de Geneville and Maud de Lacy possibly had two additional sons, Gautier and Jean.)

- Geoffrey de Geneville (died 1283)
- Sir Piers de Geneville, of Trim and Ludlow (1256- shortly before June 1292), who in his turn married in 1283 Jeanne of Lusignan, by whom he had three daughters, including Joan de Geneville, 2nd Baroness Geneville.
- Joan de Geneville, married Gerald FitzMaurice FitzGerald (died 1287).

== Later years ==
In 1283, Maud gave all her lands in England and Wales to Piers, her second eldest son by Geoffrey. These included Ludlow Castle in Shropshire, and Walterstone Manor as well as all the knights' fees which she had held in England. That same year, her son Geoffrey died.

Maud was described as independent-minded, and she usually accompanied her husband on his numerous travels abroad, which included Rome where he was sent on a mission to Pope Nicholas IV in 1290. She was aged sixty at the time. Maud was highly protective of her properties, and always ready to enter into litigation at the slightest threat to her lands or privileges whether posed by family members, the Church, or the Dublin administration.

Maud died at Trim Castle on 11 April 1304 at the age of seventy-four. Her husband Geoffrey died ten years later. Their son Piers had died in 1292, leaving Joan as heiress-apparent to the estates and lordships. She succeeded as the suo jure 2nd Baroness Geneville on 21 October 1314.
