= Trim Castle =

Largest Norman castle in Ireland (ruin), Trim, County Meath

- Trim, County Meath, Ireland
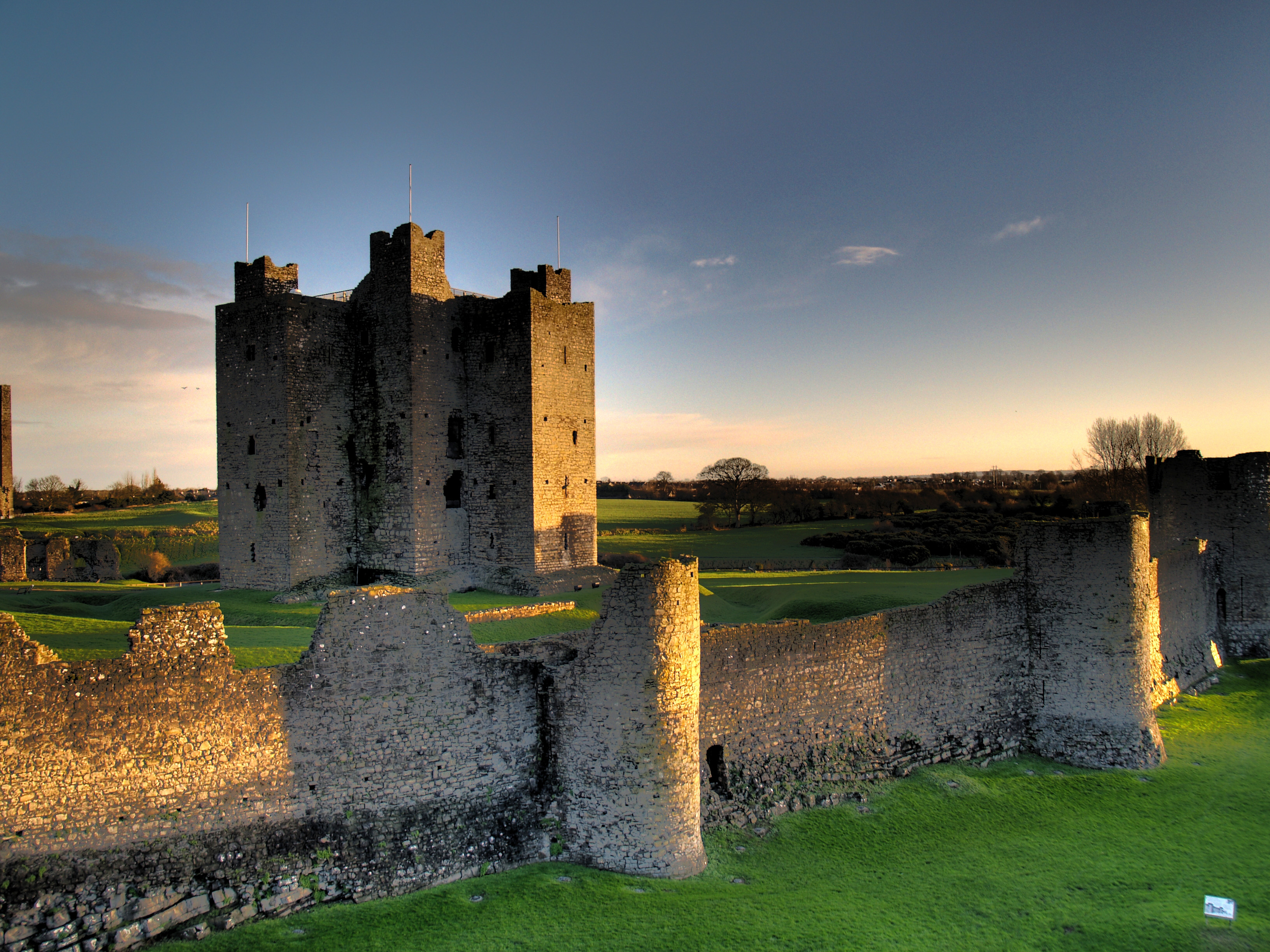
- The keep and curtain walls of Trim Castle

Site information
- Type: Medieval castle
- Owner: Currently the Irish Government through the Office of Public Works
- Condition: Ruin

Location
- Location within Ireland
- Coordinates: 53.555°N 6.7897°W

Site history
- Built: from the 12th century
- Built by: Hugh de Lacy (keep)
- In use: Open to public

National monument of Ireland
- Official name: Trim Castle
- Reference no.: 514

Trim Castle (Irish: Caisleán Bhaile Átha Troim) is a castle on the south bank of the River Boyne in Trim, County Meath, Ireland, with an area of 30,000 m^{2}. Over a period of 30 years, it was built by Hugh de Lacy and his son Walter as the caput of the Lordship of Meath. The Irish Government currently own and are in charge of the care of the castle, through the state agency The Office of Public Works (OPW).

The castle is on the List of National Monuments in County Meath.

== History ==
=== De Lacy ===
The land area of Meath was owned by the church but was granted to Hugh de Lacy in 1172 by Henry II of England as one of the new administrative areas. De Lacy built a huge ringwork castle defended by a stout double palisade and external ditch on top of the hill. There may also have been further defences around the cliffs fringing the high ground. Part of a stone footed timber gatehouse lies beneath the present stone gate at the west side of the castle.

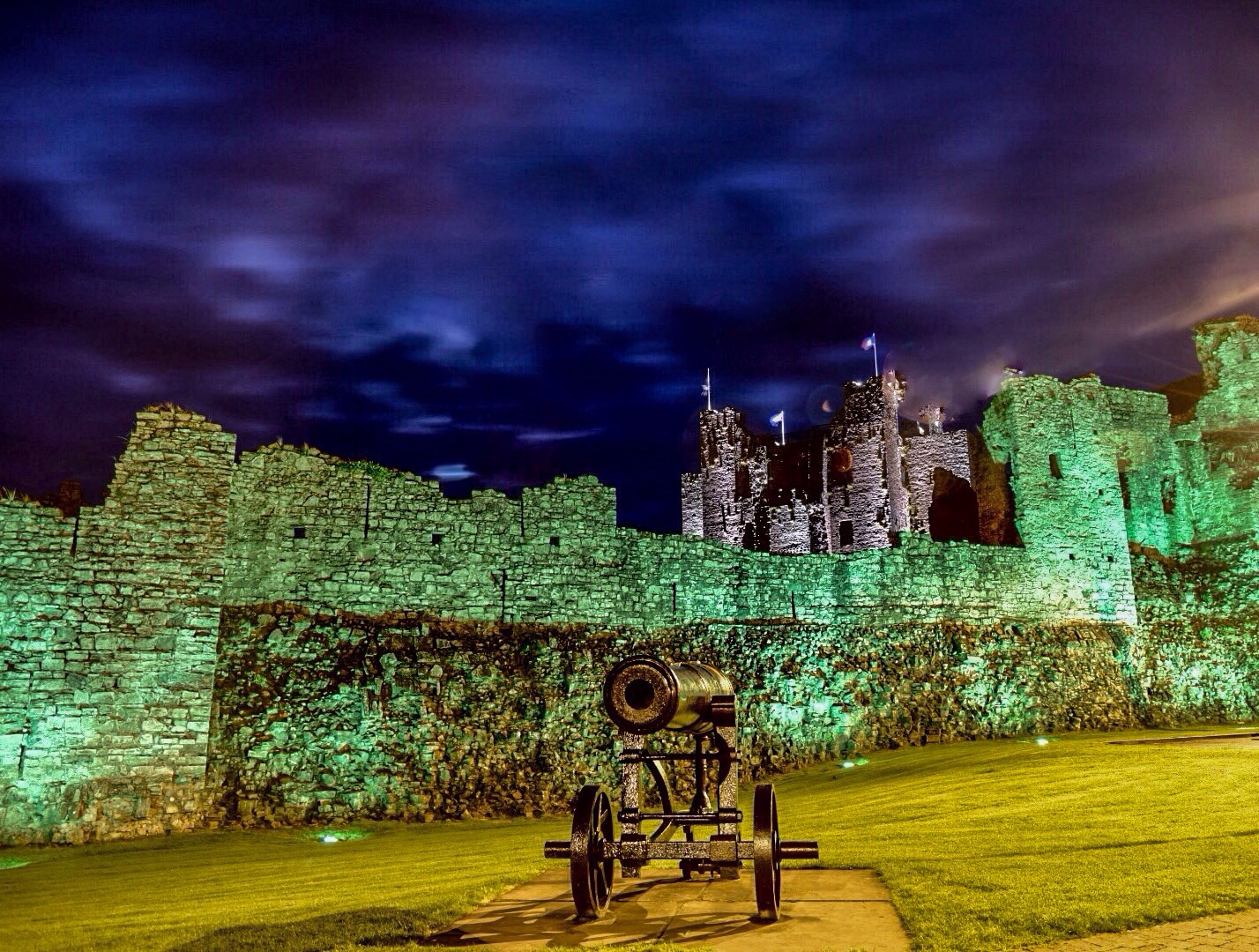
Trim Castle at night.

The site was chosen because it is on raised ground, overlooking a fording point on the River Boyne. The area was an important early medieval ecclesiastical and royal site that was navigable in medieval times by boat up the River Boyne, about 25 miles from the Irish Sea. Trim Castle is referred to in the Norman poem The Song of Dermot and the Earl.

De Lacy left Ireland entrusting the castle to Hugh Tyrrel, baron of Castleknock, one of his chief lieutenants. The ringwork was attacked and burnt by forces of the Gaelic High King of Ireland, Ruaidrí Ua Conchobair; Tyrrel, having appealed in vain for help, was forced to flee. Ua Conchobair soon withdrew and De Lacy, or Raymond FitzGerald, immediately repaired or rebuilt the castle in 1173. After Hugh's death in 1186 his son Walter de Lacy succeeded as Lord of Meath. He continued rebuilding and the castle was completed in the 1220s, most likely in 1224. The year when construction was completed was considered to be 1220 by historians in the 19th century but that is now in dispute.

=== Geneville and Mortimer ===
The next phase of the castle's development took place at the end of the 13th century and the beginning of the 14th century; a new great hall (with undercroft and attached solar in a radically altered curtain tower), a new forebuilding, and stables were added to the keep.

On Walter de Lacy's death in 1241 his granddaughter Mathilda ('Maud') inherited the castle. Her second husband was Geoffrey de Geneville (brother of the crusade historian Jean de Joinville), Lord of Vaucouleurs in Champagne, France, and of many lordships in England and Ireland which were to devolve upon his heirs. His son Piers de Geneville (who married Joan de Lusignan) died in 1292 leaving a daughter Joan, who in 1301 married Roger Mortimer (1st Earl of March). Mathilda having died in 1304, in 1308 Geoffrey conveyed his Irish lordships to Roger Mortimer, and entered the priory at St. Mary's in Trim. Joan Mortimer inherited the title Baroness Geneville suo jure when Geoffrey died in 1314.

The castle thereby passed to the Mortimer family who held it until 1425, when the male line died out with Edmund Mortimer, 5th Earl of March. After this the estate passed to Richard of York, son of Edmund's sister Anne Mortimer by Richard of Conisburgh, 3rd Earl of Cambridge. Richard of York was killed at the Battle of Wakefield in 1460, and in 1461 his son, King Edward IV, appointed Germyn Lynch, goldsmith of London, to be his representative at Trim as warden and master worker of the new issues of moneys and coins within the Castles of Dublin and Trim, and the town of Galway.

=== Later ownership ===
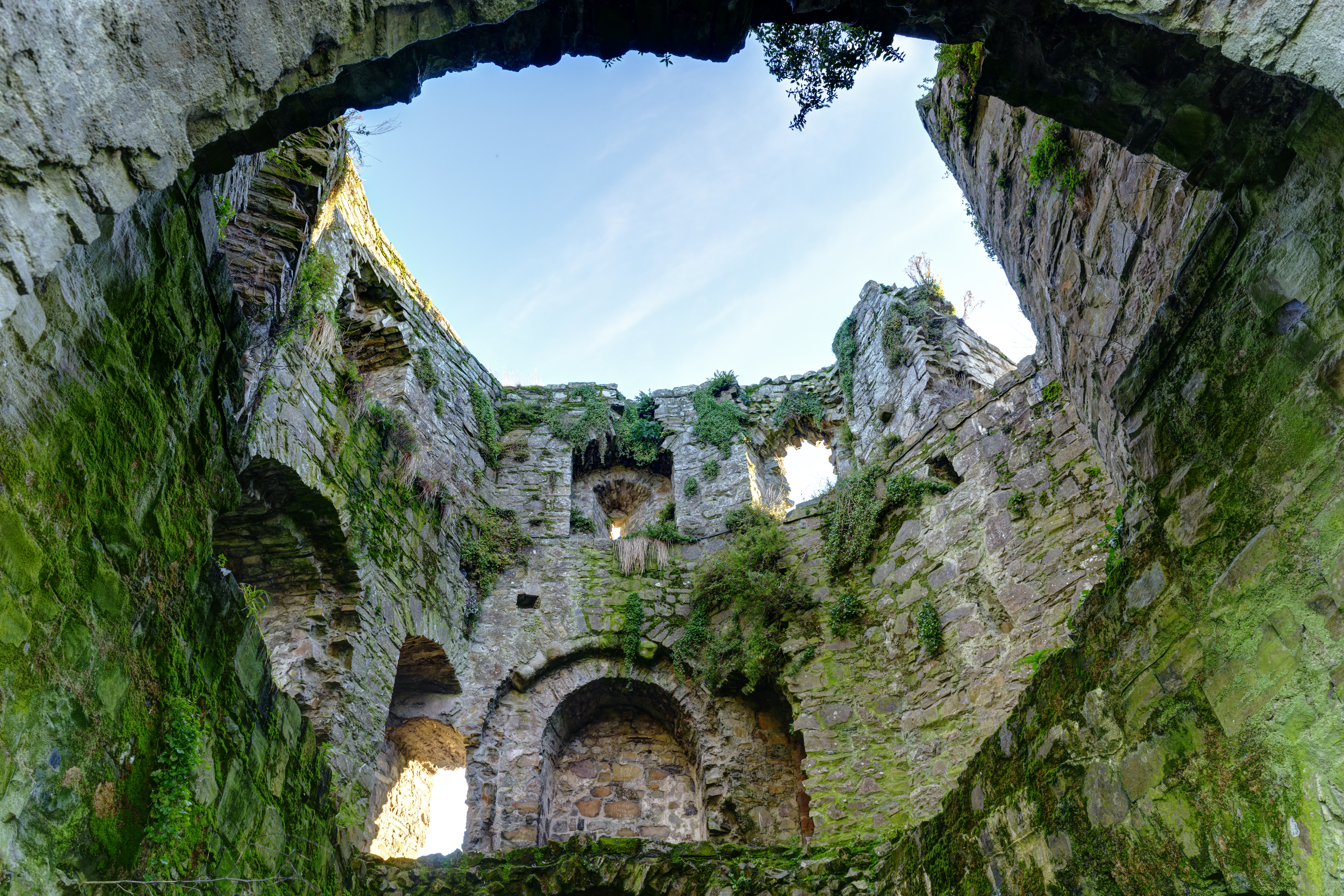
The inside of one of the towers of Trim Castle.

During the 15th century the Irish Parliament met in Trim Castle seven times and a mint operated in the castle. It was at that time the centre of administration for Meath and marked the outer northern boundary of The Pale. In the 16th century it fell into decline and was allowed to deteriorate, but it was refortified during the Irish Confederate Wars in the 1640s. In 1649 after the sacking of Drogheda, the garrison of Trim fled to join other Irish forces and the place was occupied by the army of Oliver Cromwell.

After the wars of the 1680s, the castle was granted to the Wellesley family who held it until Arthur Wellesley (the Duke of Wellington), sold it to the Leslies. In following years it passed via the Encumbered Estates Court into the hands of the Dunsany Plunketts. They left the lands open and from time to time allowed various uses, with part of the Castle Field rented for some years by the Town Council as a municipal dump, and a small meeting hall for the Royal British Legion erected. The Dunsany held the Castle and surrounds until 1993, when after years of discussion, Lord Dunsany sold the land and buildings to the State, retaining only river access and fishing rights.

=== Restoration ===
The Office of Public Works began a major programme of exploratory works and conservation, costing in the region of 4.5 million euro, including partial restoration of the moat and the installation of a protective roof on the keep. The castle was re-opened to the public in 2000.

== Structure ==
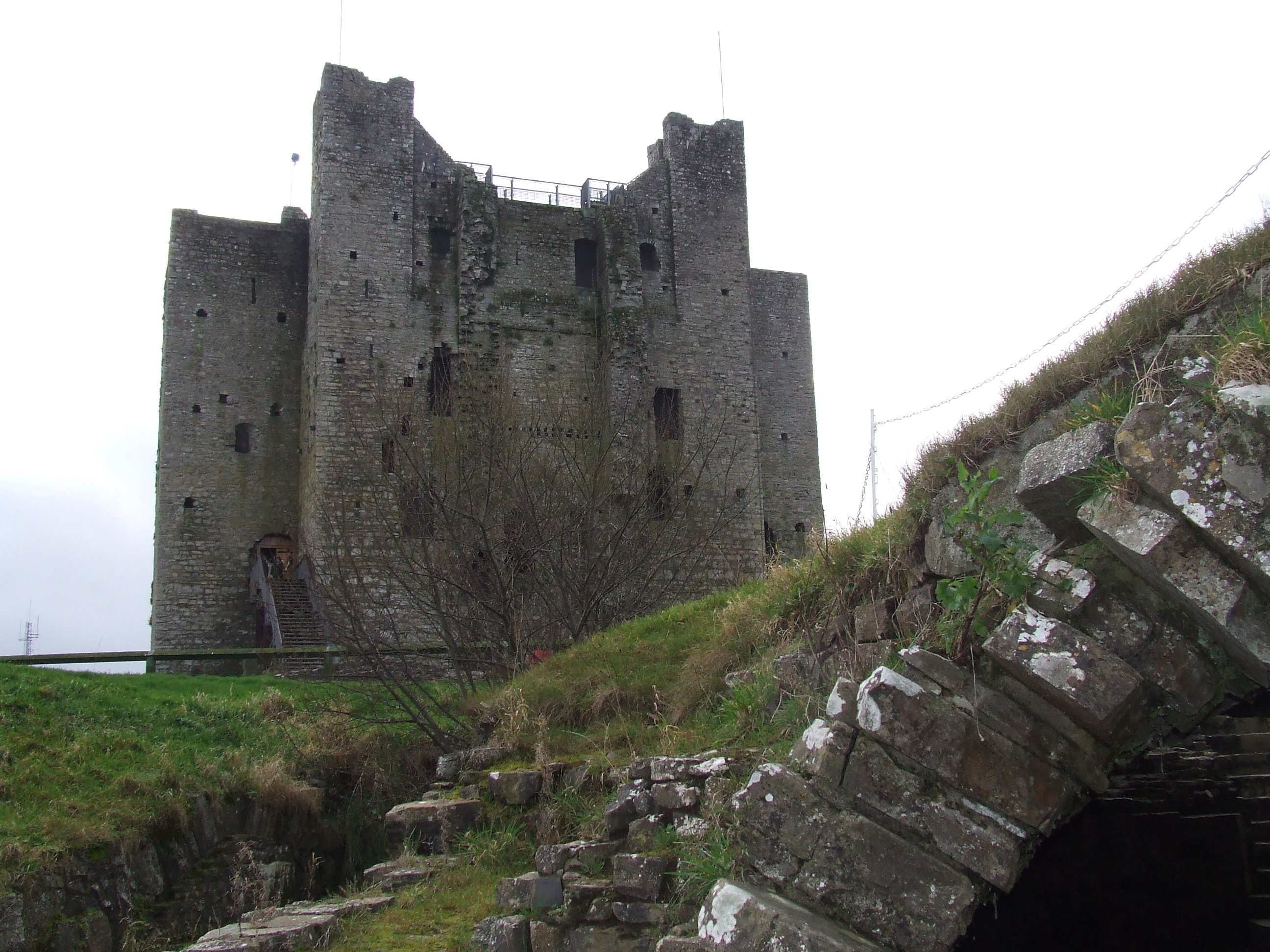
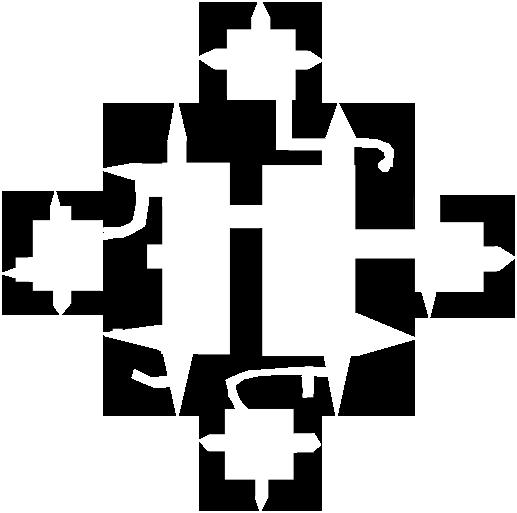
The keep viewed from the undercroft of the Great hall near the River Gate, and a plan

With an area of 30,000 m^{2}, Trim Castle is the largest Cambro-Norman castle in Ireland. The design of the central three-storey keep (also known as a donjon or great tower) is unique for a Norman keep being of cruciform shape, with twenty corners. It was built on the site of the previous large ring work fortification in at least three stages, initially by Hugh de Lacy (c. 1174) and then in 1196 and 1201–5 by Walter de Lacy. The castle interior was partially the subject of archaeological digs, by David Sweetman of the OPW in the 1970s, and more extensively by Alan Hayden in the 1990s.

The surviving curtain walls are predominantly of three phases. The west and north sides of the enceinte are defended by rectangular towers (including the Trim Gate) dating to the 1170s; the Dublin gate was erected in the 1190s or early part of the 13th century; and the remaining wall to the south with its round towers dates to the first two decades of the 13th century. The castle has two main gates. The one in the west side dates to the 1170s and sits on top of a demolished wooden gateway. The upper stories of the stone tower were altered to a semi-octagonal shape, c. 1200. The Dublin Gate in the south wall is a single round towered gate with an external barbican tower. It dates from the 1190s or early 13th century and was the first example of its type to be constructed in Ireland.

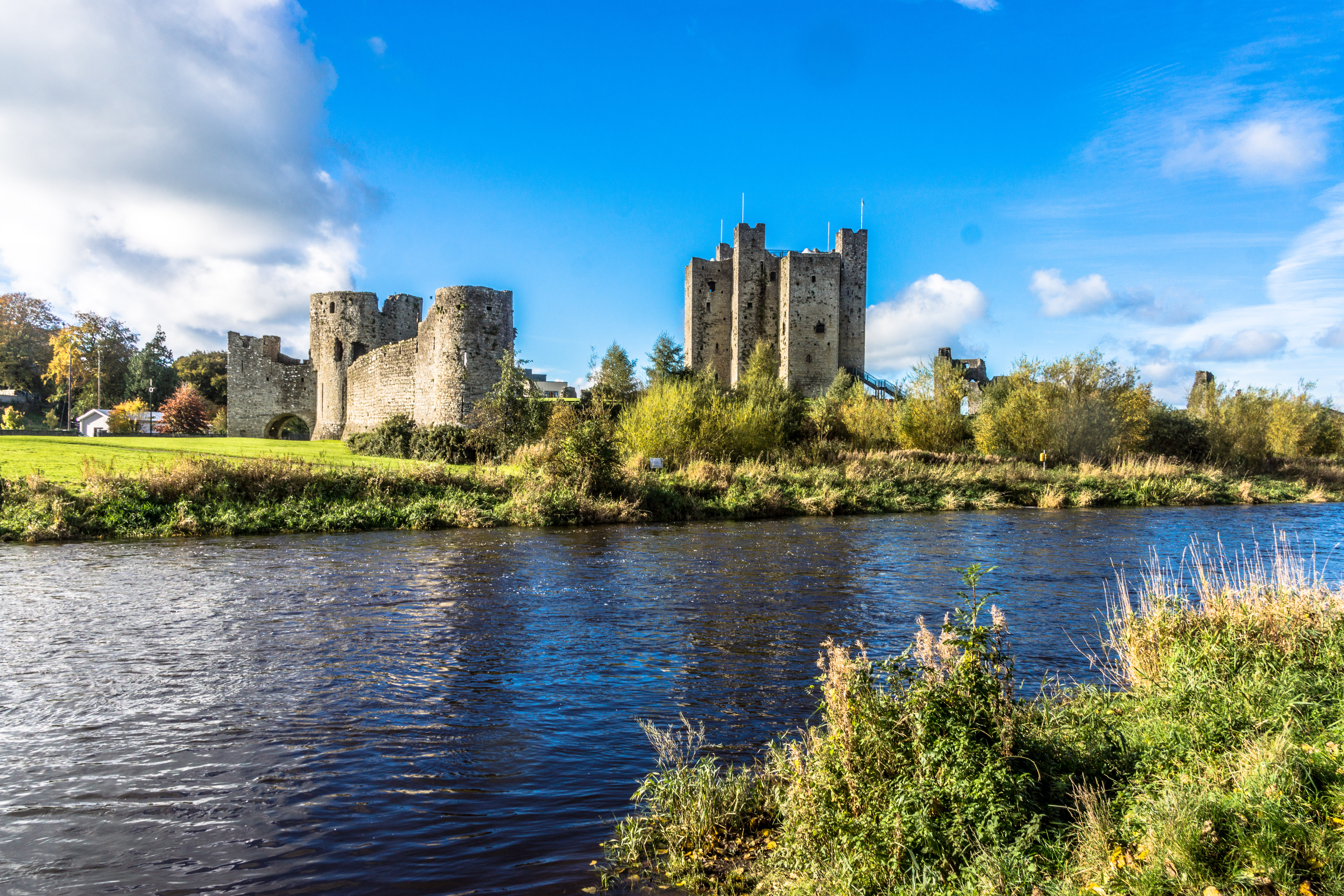
The Dublin Gate barbican tower at the southern curtain wall (left) and the main tower (right)

Apart from the keep, the main extant structures consist of the following: an early 14th-century three-towered fore work defending the keep entrance and including stables within it (accessed by a stone causeway crossing the partly filled-in ditch of the earlier ringwork); a huge late 13th-century three-aisled great hall (with an under croft beneath its east end opening via a water gate to the river); a stout defensive tower (turned into a solar in the late 13th century at the northern angle of the castle); a smaller aisled hall (added to the east end of the great hall in the 14th or 15th century); a building (possibly the mint) added to the east end of the latter hall; two 15th- or 16th-century stone buildings added inside the town gatehouse, 17th-century buildings (added to the end of the hall range and to the north side of the keep) and a series of lime kilns (one dating from the late 12th century, the remainder from the 18th and 19th centuries).

== Access ==
The Office of Public Works operate a Guide Service at Trim Castle and the grounds are open to the public for self-guiding, on payment of an entry fee. Access to the Castle keep is by guided tour only, an entry fee also applies. In winter, the complex is open only on weekends and bank holidays.

== Popular culture ==
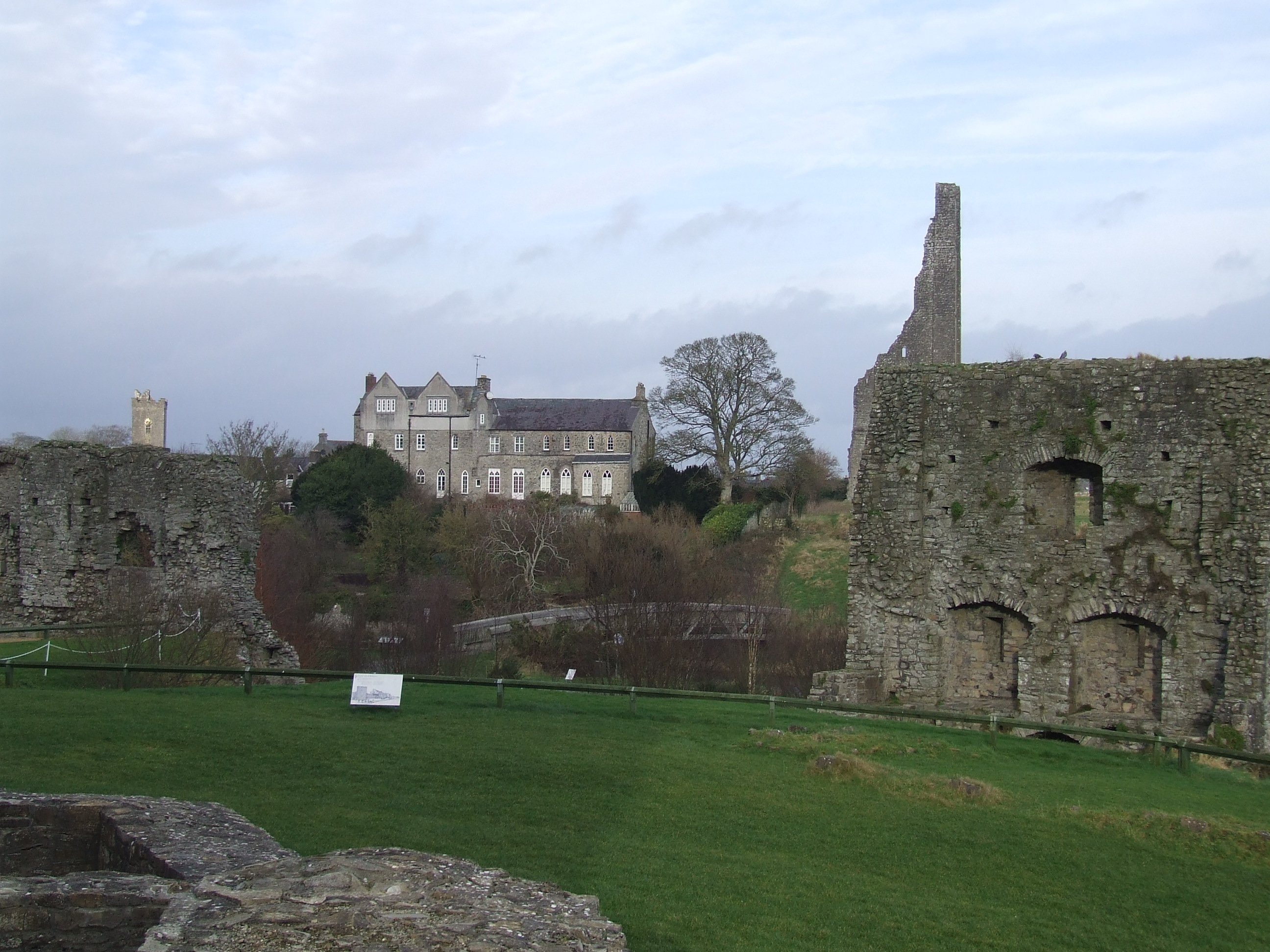
Trim and Talbot Castles. Also visible are the Royal Mint, solar and Trim Cathedral

The 1980 movie The Big Red One, starring Lee Marvin and Mark Hamill, was also partially shot in Trim and in particular at Trim Castle.

The castle is noted for the part it played in the filming of Mel Gibson's film Braveheart. The castle was presented as the walled city of York; scenes that took place in London were also filmed here.

== Controversies ==
In 2003 there was a controversy surrounding the decision by the Minister for the Environment, Heritage and Local Government Martin Cullen not to oppose the construction of a five-storey hotel across the road from the castle. The development had been condemned by a local councillor, a senior inspector in An Bord Pleanála (acting in a private capacity, and later choosing to withdraw his appeal lest it be considered a conflict of interest) and heritage bodies, many of whom had been critical of the government's treatment of other heritage sites such as Carrickmines Castle (the ruins of which were excavated partly to allow the completion of a roadway). The hotel was opened in August 2006.

The recent addition of buildings outside the west side of the town has further intruded on the castle remains.

== See also ==
- Castles in Great Britain and Ireland
- List of castles in Ireland

== Sources ==
- Reeves-Smith, Terrence. 1995. Irish Castles. Belfast: The Appletree Press Ltd.
- De Breffny, Brian. 1977. Castles of Ireland. London: Thames and Hudson.
- Salter, Mike. 1993. Castles and Strong Houses of Ireland. Worc.: Folly Publications.
- Sweetman, David. 1999. The Medieval Castles of Ireland. Cork: The Collins Press.
- McNeill, Tom. 1997. Castles in Ireland. London: Routledge.
