= The Black Friary =

Coordinates: 53°33′37″N 06°47′21″W

The Black Friary (Irish: An Mhainistir Dhubh) was a Dominican friary located in Trim, County Meath, Ireland.

== History ==
It's believed that the first patron of the friary was Geoffrey de Geneville and that it was founded in 1263, just outside the town walls of Trim. Geoffrey de Geneville retired to the friary and was buried there in 1314. The friary was an important part of the town of Trim as it held extensive lands and ecclesiastical and governmental meetings were held there from the 13th to the 15th century. Matthew Hussey, 4th Baron Galtrim, was a noted benefactor of the Friary, and was buried there in 1418.

By 1540, as part of the dissolution of the monasteries, the commissioners of King Henry VIII suppressed the friary and sold its lands, buildings and goods. During the 18th century the buildings were further sold and quarried for stone. The grounds continued to be used as a cillín cemetery into the 18th century.

== Archaeology ==
The Blackfriary Archaeology Field School is excavating this site which is in the ownership of the local authority Meath County Council. The excavations have been ongoing since 2010 (formerly in association with the Irish Archaeology Field School). The Director of the excavations (Principal Investigator) since 2010 is Finola O'Carroll, and Dr. Rachel E. Scott of DePaul University, Chicago, has been the project bioarchaeologist (osteoarchaeologist) since 2012. These annual excavations undertaken by Irish and international students of the Field School together with members of the local community have helped to reveal the architecture of the friary while also uncovering burials from inside and outside the church. Courses in Bioarchaeology and Osteoarchaeology on-site form part of the research programme for the Blackfriary cemetery.

The most recent excavations have confirmed the presence of two cloisters or courts in the friary. The main cloister, situated immediately to the north of the church, had a cloister arcade fashioned from Purbeck Marble, a find so far without parallels in Ireland. Ongoing excavations continue to reveal details of the layout of the buildings, suggesting the presence of a scriptorium as well as the chapter house in the east range.

=== The Blackfriary Community Heritage and Archaeology Project ===
The excavations undertaken by the Blackfriary Archaeology Field School are run in conjunction with the Blackfriary Community Heritage and Archaeology Project (BCHAP). The project aims to rejuvenate the six-acre site where the Friary is located for the benefit of the local community and visitors alike.

== See also ==
- Trim Castle, home of Geoffrey de Geneville
- List of abbeys and priories in Ireland (County Meath)
