= Geoffrey de Geneville, 1st Baron Geneville =

Anglo-French noble (c. 1226–1314)

Geoffrey de Geneville
- 1st Baron Geneville
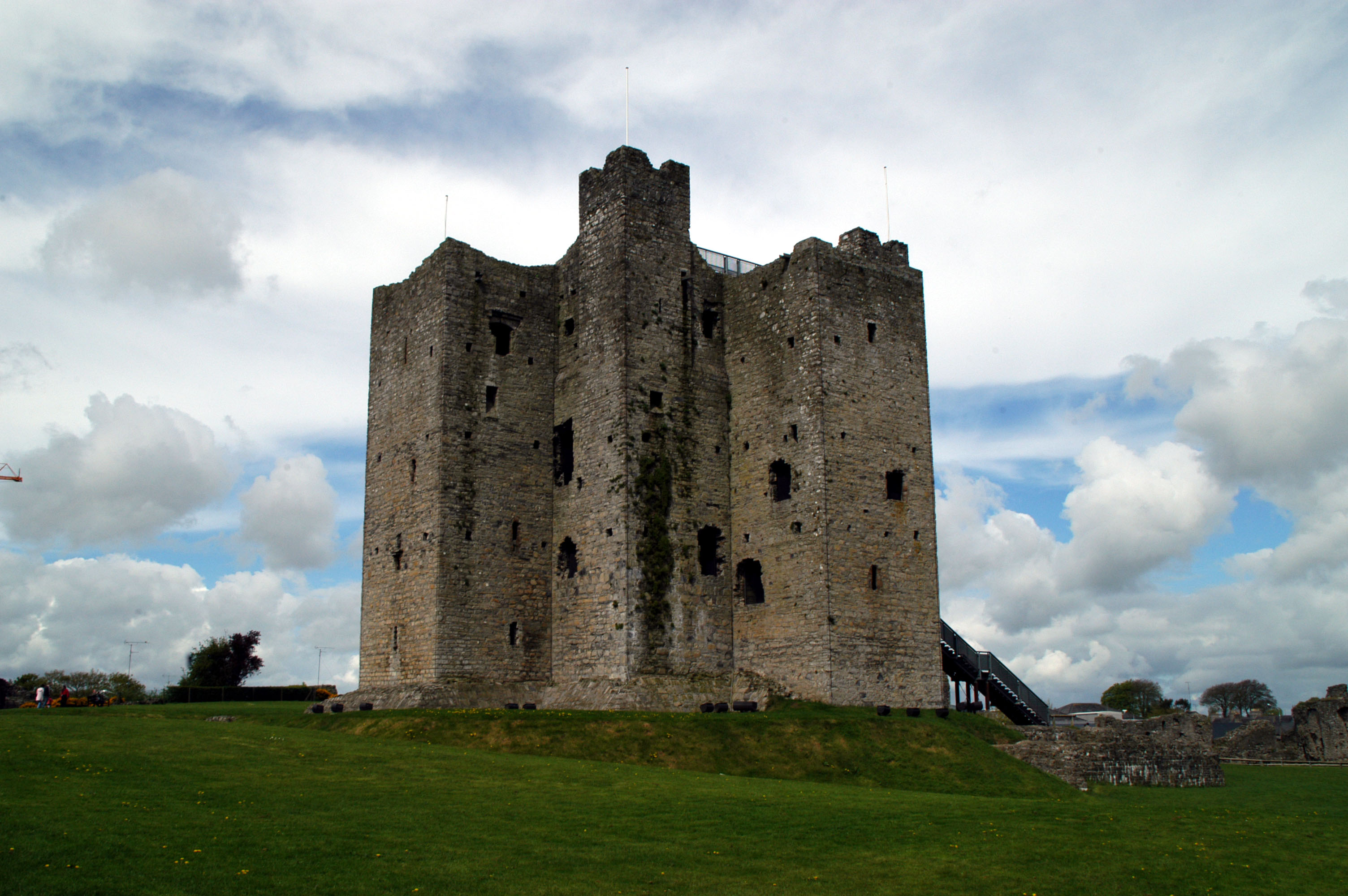
- Trim Castle
- Heir: Roger Mortimer and Joan
- Born: c. 1226; Champagne
- Died: 21 October 1314; Trim, County Meath
- Buried: The Black Friary, Trim
- Wife: Maud de Lacy, Baroness Geneville (1252–1304)
- Issue: 5 (or more), including Geoffrey, Peter (Piers), and Simon
- Father: Simon of Joinville
- Mother: Beatrix d'Auxonne

Geoffrey de Geneville, 1st Baron Geneville (c. 1226 – 21 October 1314) also known as Geoffrey de Joinville and Geoffroi de Joinville, was an Anglo-French noble, supporter of Henry III, who appointed him Baron of Trim, County Meath, and, subsequently, a staunch supporter of Edward I.

== Family and marriage ==
Geoffrey was Seigneur of Vaucouleurs in Champagne, second son of Simon of Joinville and Beatrix d'Auxonne (daughter of Stephen III of Auxonne), and younger brother of Jean de Joinville.

Geoffrey's mother, Beatrice of Auxonne had been previously married to Aymon de Faucigny by which they had a daughter, Agnes of Faucigny. Agnes was married to Peter II, Count of Savoy. This made Geoffrey a half-brother-in-law to Peter II, Count of Savoy This relationship explains the role played by Geoffrey de Joinville at the English court and their preferment in England. Geoffrey was thus one of the "Savoyards" who arrived in England in the retinue of Eleanor of Provence, whose mother was from Savoy, at the time of her marriage to King Henry III in 1236.

Some time between 1249 and 8 August 1252, Henry III arranged Geoffrey's marriage to Maud (or 'Mathilda') de Lacy, widow of another Savoyard, Pierre de Genève, himself also a relative of Queen Eleanor, who had died in 1249. Maud had been co-heiress to vast estates and lordships in Ireland, Herefordshire, and the Welsh Marches, and the marriage is considered typical of Henry's 'policy' of appointing such 'aliens' to retain control of the outlying regions of the kingdom. Geoffrey thus came to control vast estates in Ireland centred at Trim, the Welsh borders at Ludlow, Ewyas Lacy and others in England. Maud and Geoffrey had at least four sons, Geoffrey, Simon, William and Peter (or Piers).

== Political and military career ==
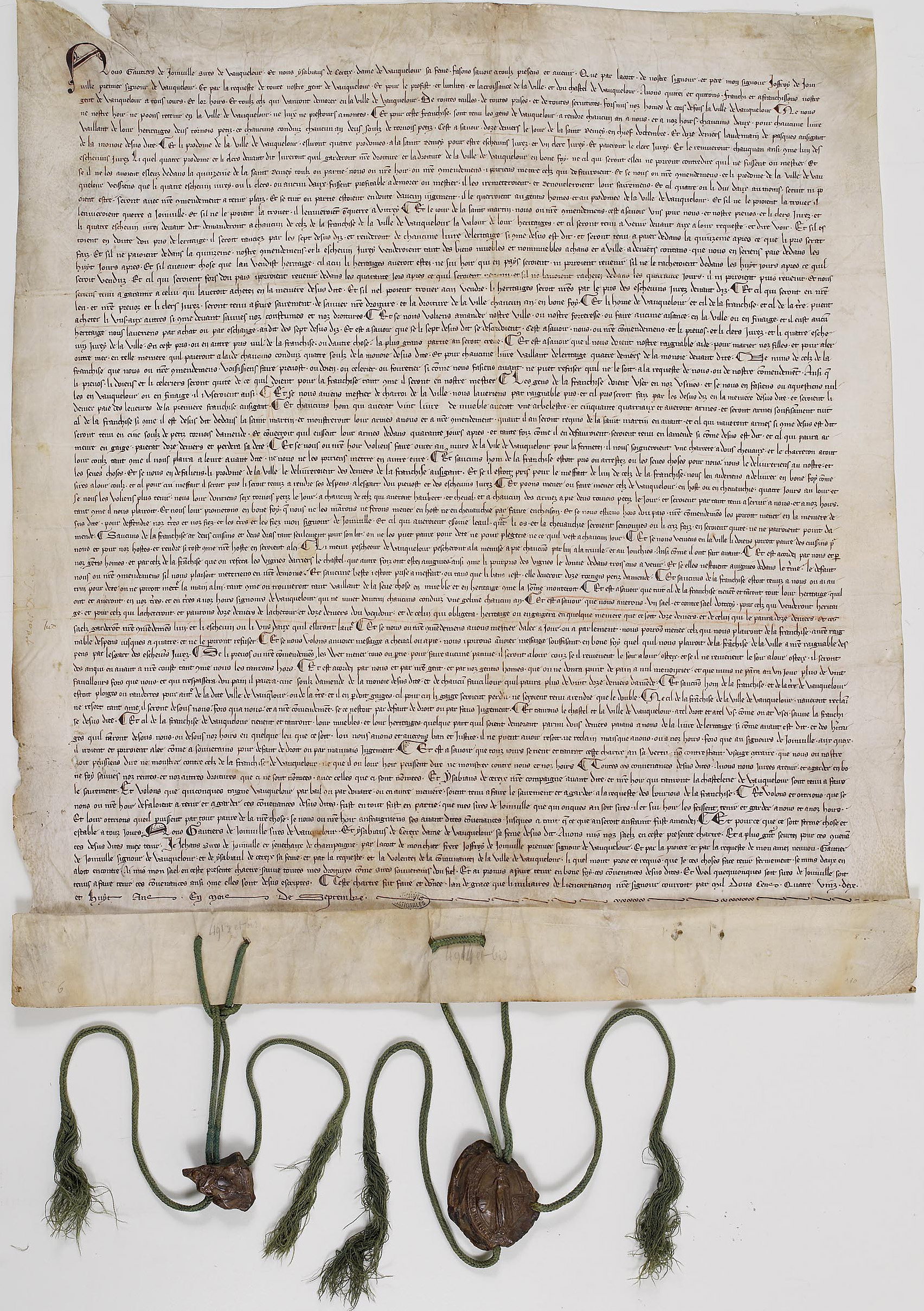
Charter for Vaucouleurs, Grant of 1298 by Walter (son of Joffroy), confirmed by Jean de Joinville (brother of Joffroy), "in the court of my dear brother Joffroy de Joinville, 'premier seignour de Vauquelour'" (Archives Nationales de France)

Geoffrey was both a military figure and political negotiator. He successfully pacified the Irish pro-Montfort and Royalist barons at this time that assisted the future Edward I's success at Evesham. In 1267, he assisted Henry III with negotiations with Llywelyn ap Gruffudd, the year of the Treaty of Montgomery.

With another of his brothers, William, he accompanied Edward on the Eighth Crusade in 1270, fought in Welsh Wars, and went on diplomatic missions to Paris. He served as justiciar of Ireland from 1273 to 1276 but had little success against the Leinster Irish, being heavily defeated in 1274 and 1276. In 1280, he acted as Edward's envoy in Paris and to the papal curia, a mission repeated ten years later in 1290.

In 1282, he was assistant to the Marshal of England in the Welsh War of that year. In 1283, he granted his English lands to his son Peter (Piers) and focused his attention on Ireland. He and his wife defended their liberty rights in Trim against the Dublin government, and defined military duties for his tenants.

In 1297, he supported Edward in the crisis caused by royal demands for men and money for the war in France. Edward appointed Geoffrey as Marshal of England in place of the main dissenter Roger Bigod, Earl of Norfolk until the crisis was over. Geneville subsequently received a number of summonses to parliaments between February 1299 and November 1306.

== Later life ==
Geoffrey's wife and their eldest son pre-deceased him, Maud dying on 11 April 1304. In 1308, aged about eighty, he conveyed most, but not all, of his Irish lordships to Roger Mortimer, husband of his eldest granddaughter and heir, Joan. He retired to the Dominican Black Friary at Trim, which he had established in 1263. He died on 21 October 1314, and was buried there. Upon his death, Joan succeeded him as "suo jure" Baroness Geneville.
