= Ballyboggan Abbey =

Ruined religious complex in County Meath, Ireland

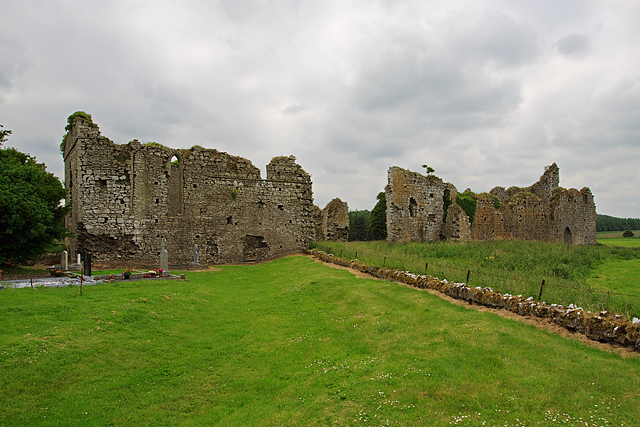
- Ballyboggan Abbey viewed from the graveyard
- Interactive map of Ballyboggan Abbey

Monastery information
- Order: Augustinian Canons
- Established: 12th or 13th century
- Disestablished: 1537
- Dedicated to: Holy Trinity
- Diocese: Diocese of Meath

Site
- Location: County Meath, Ireland
- Coordinates: 53°24′35.7″N 7°02′37.5″W

Ballyboggan Abbey, also known as Ballyboggan Priory, is a ruined monastic complex situated near the River Boyne in County Meath. The site is located 7.5 km south of Kinnegad; the R401 road to Edenderry passes nearby. Remaining structures include the abbey church's chancel, nave and a small portion of the south transept.

== History ==
The abbey was founded in the 12th or 13th century by Jordan Comyn (or "Comin") under a monastic order of Augustinian canons. Records from 1283 suggest that the abbey's prior was then the subject of "letters of simple protection" by the Crown. The abbey's church was dedicated to the Holy Trinity and known historically as the abbey of "De Laude Dei" meaning 'to the praise of God'. The site was part of a sacred pilgrimage known in particular for the veneration of a wooden cross owned by the abbey.

The complex was damaged by fire in 1446, and dissolved during the Reformation by Henry VIII, surrendered by its last prior Thomas Bermingham on 15 October 1537. The sacred wooden cross of Ballyboggan was burned publicly in Trim in 1538 with a statue of the Virgin Mary belonging to the abbey in Trim.

== Location and remains ==
The site is located 7.5 km south of Kinnegad; the R401 road to Edenderry passes nearby. Remaining structures include the abbey church's chancel, nave and a small portion of the south transept. The surviving portion of the chancel measures 17 m x 10.2 m, and the nave measures 34.5 m x 10.2 m. A boundary wall separates the chancel from the remainder of the monastic complex. The cloister of the abbey is visible only as a raised platform of ground to the south and east of the standing ruins of the chancel and nave.

As of the 21st century, the graveyard and chancel is owned by Meath County Council, while the remains of the nave and south transept are located on private land.

== See also ==
- Diocese of Meath
- List of abbeys and priories in Ireland
- Dissolution of the monasteries in Ireland
