= Ebulo de Montibus =

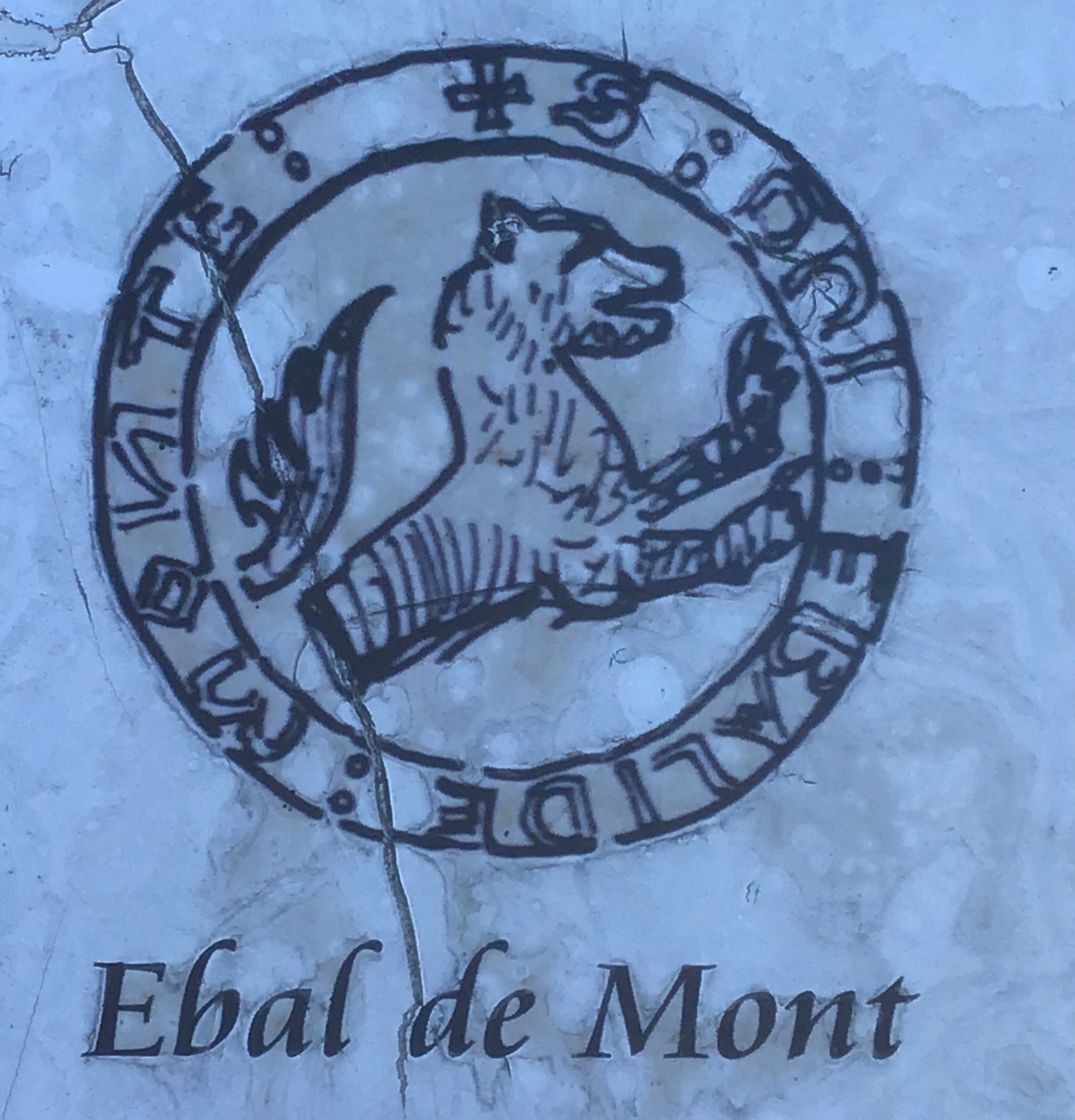
Ebal de Mont Seal

Ebulo de Montibus (French Ebal II de Mont) (c.1230 – 1269) Born as a younger son of Ebal I de Mont and his wife, Beatrice, Ebal II was first noted in 1237. Born in the Pays de Vaud, now Switzerland then Savoy. The Famille de Mont held the castle at Mont-le-Grand near Rolle. Better known in English records as Ebulo de Montibus, Ebal II de Mont had travelled to England by 1246. A household knight of King Henry III of England, granted much land in England.

By 1256 he was part of the Savoyard circle of the Lord Edward (possibly steward), later King Edward I of England. Recorded as a Steward in the household of King Henry III of England from 12 November 1256 until 26 May 1263. A witness for King Henry III at the Mise of Amiens, where he swore for the king's good conduct in accepting King Louis IX's arbitration.

Left England during the Second Barons' War with Queen Eleanor of Provence and Peter II, Count of Savoy and active in attempting to raise an army loyal to the crown. Rewarded for his loyalty by being made Constable and Governor of Windsor Castle.

His son Ebal IV began as a squire in the service of King Edward I of England, assigned with Jean Cosyn de Grandson as being jointly responsible for Harlech from 1283, during early construction and prior to the appointment of its first Constable, John de Bonvillars. He was close to Eleanor of Castile, married Lady Elizabeth de Clinton possibly through her intervention. Fought in Scotland in 1300 and obtained land there. Later he became Constable and Governor of Stirling Castle and Edinburgh Castle.
