= Maud le Vavasour, Baroness Butler =

Irish noble

Maud 'Matilda' le Vavasour
- Born: 1176; Yorkshire, England
- Died: 1225 (aged 48–49)
- Title: Baroness Butler
- Spouse(s): Theobald Walter, 1st Baron Butler; Fulk FitzWarin
- Children: Theobald le Botiller; Maud le Botiller; Beatrice le Botiller; Sir Fulk FitzWarin; Hawise FitzWarin
- Parent(s): Robert le Vavasor – High Sheriff of Lancashire grand-daughter of Adam FitzPeter of Birkin

Maud 'Matilda' le Vavasour, Baroness Butler (c. 24 June 1176 – 1225) was an Anglo-Norman heiress and the wife of Fulk FitzWarin, a medieval landed gentleman who was forced to become an outlaw in the early 13th century, who is allegedly linked to the tale of Robin Hood and its origins.

By her first marriage to Theobald Walter, 1st Baron Butler, Maud was the ancestress of the Butler Earls of Ormond.

== Family ==
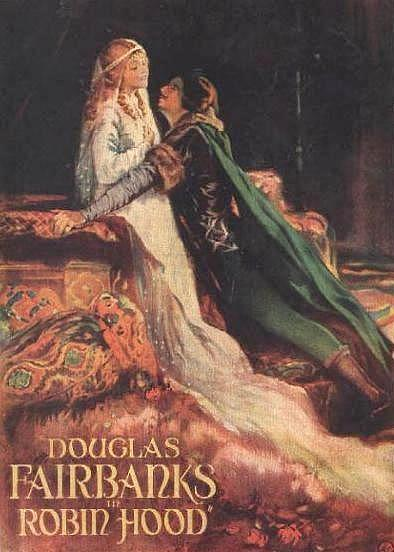
The legend of Robin Hood and Maid Marian is allegedly based on Fulk FitzWarin and Maud le Vavasour

Maud le Vavasour was the daughter of Robert le Vavasour, deputy sheriff of Lancashire (1150–1227), and his first wife, an unnamed daughter of Adam de Birkin. She had a half-brother, Sir John le Vavasour who married Alice Cockfield, by whom he had issue. Maud's paternal grandfather was William le Vavasour, Lord of Hazlewood, and Justiciar of England. Her maternal grandfather was Adam fitz Peter of Birkin.

Maud was heiress to properties in Edlington, Yorkshire and Narborough in Leicestershire.

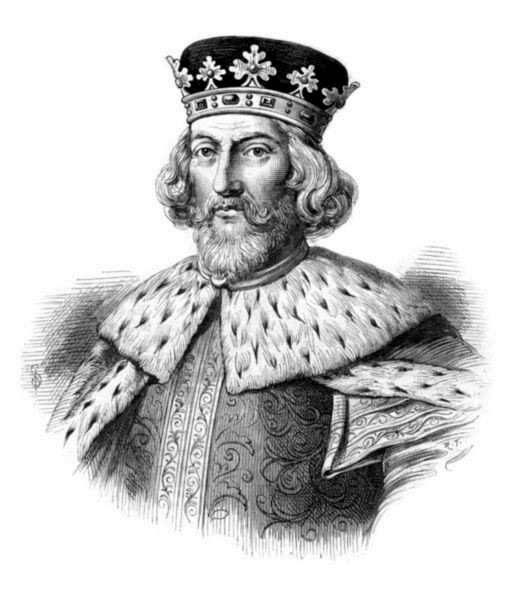
John, King of England with whom Maud's husband Fulk FitzWarin quarrelled

She is a matrilineal ancestor of Anne Boleyn, Queen of England and second wife to King Henry VIII of England.

== Marriages and issue ==
In or shortly before 1200, Maud married her first husband Theobald Walter, 1st Baron Butler (died February 1206), son of Hervey Walter and Maud de Valoignes, and went to live in Ireland. His brother Hubert Walter was Archbishop of Canterbury. In 1185, Theobald had been granted land by Prince John, who was then Lord of Ireland. He was appointed Butler of Ireland in 1192, and High Sheriff of Lancashire in 1194.

Theobald and Maud had three children:

- a female (dead by 1240), married as his first wife Sir Gerald de Prendergast by whom she had issue, including Marie de Prendergast, who in her turn married Sir John de Cogan and had issue. She is only known because a later inquisition claimed that Gerald married a "sister of Theobald pincerna", no name is given to her, and no dates.
- Theobald le Botiller, chief Butler of Ireland (by 1199 – 19 July 1230), who married firstly Joan du Marais, daughter of Geoffrey du Marais and Eva de Bermingham, and had a son, Theobald Butler (1224–1248), who married Margery de Burgh, daughter of Richard Mor de Burgh, Lord of Connacht, and Egidia de Lacy (daughter of Walter de Lacy and Margaret de Braose), and from whom descended the Earls of Ormond. Theobald, chief Butler of Ireland married, secondly, after 4 September 1225, Roesia de Verdun (1205 – 10 February 1247), daughter of Nicholas de Verdun and Clementia, by whom he had a son and daughter: John le Botiller de Verdon, Lord of Westmeath (1226–1274), who married Margery de Lacy (1229 – after 10 June 1276), by whom he had issue, and Maud le Botiller de Verdon, who married John Fitzalan, Lord of Oswestry and Clun.

Following the death of Theobald in early February 1206, Maud returned to England into the custody of her father, who, having bought the right of marrying her at the price of 1200 marks and two palfreys, gave her in marriage by October 1207, to Fulk FitzWarin. Fulk was the son of Fulk FitzWarin and Hawise de Dinan, who subsequent to a violent quarrel with John, King of England, was deprived of his lands and property by the vengeful king. Fulk then sought refuge in the woods and became an outlaw, with Maud having accompanied him. The legendary figures of Robin Hood and Maid Marian are said to be based on Fulk and Maud. Maud died in 1226 and Fulke III married again to Clarice D'Auberville.

By FitzWarin, Maud had two sons and three daughters:

- Fulk IV
- Fulk Glas
- Hawise, wife of William Pantulf
- Joanna
- Mabel

== In fiction ==
Maud is the main protagonist in Elizabeth Chadwick's Lords of The White Castle, which relates in fictional form, her life and adventures as the wife of Fulk FitzWarin.
