= Theobald Butler =

Theobald Butler may refer to:

- Theobald Walter, 1st Baron Butler (died 1206)
- Theobald le Botiller, 2nd Chief Butler of Ireland (died 1230)
- Theobald Butler, 3rd Chief Butler of Ireland (c. 1224–1248)
- Theobald Butler, 4th Chief Butler of Ireland (c. 1242–1285)
- Theobald Butler of Polestown (16th century)
- Theobald Butler, 1st Baron Cahir (died 1596)
- Theobald Butler (solicitor-general) (1650–1721), barrister and politician in Ireland
- Theobald Butler, 1st Viscount Butler of Tulleophelim (died 1613), Irish peer
- Theobald Butler, 14th Baron Dunboyne (1806–1881), Irish peer
- Lord Theobald Butler, (1852 – 1929), British clergyman

== See also ==
- Theobald Butler Barrett (1894–1969), Canadian politician
