= Eve de Bermingham, Lady of Offaly =

Norman-Irish noblewoman

Eve de Bermingham
- suo jure Lady of Offaly
- Born: Unknown
- Died: Between June 1223/December 1226; Ireland
- Spouse(s): Gerald FitzMaurice, 1st Lord of Offaly; Geoffrey FitzRobert; Geoffrey de Marisco, Justiciar of Ireland
- Issue: Maurice FitzGerald, 2nd Lord of Offaly, Justiciar of Ireland; Robert de Marisco (possibly) Joan du Marais
- Father: Robert de Bermingham
- Mother: Unknown

Eve de Bermingham, suo jure Lady of Offaly (died between June 1223/December 1226), was a Norman-Irish heiress, being the only child of Robert de Bermingham who was enfeoffed by Strongbow with part of the kingdom of Ui Failghe. This fief became the barony of Offaly which she as the suo jure heiress, passed on to her first husband, Gerald FitzMaurice, who by right of his wife was created the 1st Lord of Offaly. She had a total of three husbands.

== Marriages and issue ==
Eve was born on an unknown date, the only daughter and suo jure heiress of Robert de Bermingham, a Norman, who arrived in Ireland with the Cambro-Norman forces of Richard de Clare, 2nd Earl of Pembroke, known to history as "Strongbow". De Bermingham was enfeoffed by Strongbow with part of the kingdom of Ui Failghe, which became the barony of Offaly. Eve's mother's name and identity is not known.

Sometime about 1183, she married her first husband, Gerald FitzMaurice, the second-eldest son of Maurice FitzGerald, Lord of Llanstephan. He became the 1st Lord of Offaly by right of marriage to her. Together they had one recorded son:

- Maurice FitzGerald, 2nd Lord of Offaly (1184 – 20 May 1257), Justiciar of Ireland, married Juliana de Grenville, by whom he had four sons.

Gerald FitzMaurice died on 15 January 1204, and was succeeded by their son and heir, Maurice.

Sometime later, Eve married her second husband, Geoffrey FitzRobert, Seneschal of Leinster. When he died in 1211, she took a third husband, Geoffrey de Marisco (du Marais), who held the office of Justiciar of Ireland from 1215 to 1221. Her son Maurice would later hold the office from 1232 to 1245. By her third husband, she had at least one son:

- Robert de Marisco, married Margaret de Ridelsford, by whom he had a daughter, Christiana de Marisco (1234–1312). The latter was the wife of Ebulo of Geneva, and a lady-in-waiting in the household of Eleanor of Provence, Queen consort of King Henry III of England.

It is not known whether Geoffrey's daughter, Joan du Marais, first wife of Theobald le Botiller, was Eve's daughter, or his daughter by an earlier, unrecorded marriage.

The female succession in the de Bermingham fee, as well as Eve's multiple marriages, slowed down the Anglo-Norman advance in the former kingdom of Ui Failghe.

== Death ==
Eve de Bermingham died in Ireland between June 1223 and December 1226.
