= John de Cogan =

Anglo-Irish knight (1220–1278)

John de Cogan was an Anglo-Irish knight who lived in the period between 1220 and 1278.

De Cogan was a grandson of Milo de Cogan (died 1182) and Christina Pagnel; his parents were Richard de Cogan (died after 1238) and Basile de Riddlesford.

He is first mentioned sub anno 1233 with the justiciar, Maurice FitzGerald, on an expedition to Connacht, with Richard Mor de Burgh, Hugh de Lacy and Walter de Ridelsford.

In the 1230s he led a contingent from Munster which participated in the conquest of Connacht under Richard Mor de Burgh. His chief followers appear to have been the Barrett family.

His lands were located in County Galway and County Mayo. He founded the abbey of Kinalehin in east Galway, for the Carthusian Order. He was also the founder of Claregalway friary. On the death of his father-in-law, Gerald Prendergast, in 1261, he inherited some of his estates in right of his wife.

In 1263 he was involved in a land dispute between Walter, Earl of Ulster, and Maurice FitzGerald.

His wife was Marie de Prendergast, older half-sister of Maud de Prendergast, Lady of Offaly. Their children included Basillia, Juliane, John (1243-c.1275). By Julian Fitzmaurice, John the younger had sons John and Thomas.

According to Knox (1908, p. 295):

In 1306, John son of William de Rathcogan, Walter de usser and Walter de Cogan were indicted for robbing the abbot of the monastery of Crossmolina. Rathcogan is a name of Charleville, which was in the Cogan estate in the county of Cork. We may suspect that an estate hereabouts {in the barony of Tirawley} passed like Castlebar from a de Barry to a Cogan.

Miles Cogan was one of the many Anglo-Irish killed by the King of Connacht in 1315.

The surname is now rendered as Goggin or Goggins in Connacht.
