= Gerald FitzMaurice, 1st Lord of Offaly =

Norman nobleman in Ireland

Gerald FitzMaurice
- 1st Lord of Offaly
- Tenure: c. 1193–1204
- Born: c. 1150
- Died: 15 January 1204
- Locality: Maynooth Castle, County Kildare, Ireland
- Noble family: FitzGerald/FitzMaurice dynasty
- Spouse: Eve de Bermingham, Lady of Offaly
- Issue: Maurice FitzGerald, 2nd Lord of Offaly, Justiciar of Ireland
- Parents: Maurice FitzGerald, Lord of Llanstephan; Alice de Montgomery

Gerald FitzMaurice, jure uxoris 1st Lord of Offaly (c. 1150 – 15 January 1204) was a Cambro-Norman nobleman who took part with his father, Maurice FitzGerald, Lord of Llanstephan, in the Norman Invasion of Ireland (1169–71). Together with his five brothers and one sister Nesta they founded the notable FitzGerald/FitzMaurice dynasty which was to play an important role in Irish history.

By right of his wife, the heiress Eve de Bermingham, Gerald was granted the barony of Offaly, thus becoming the first Lord. He is the ancestor of the Kildare and Leinster branch of the dynasty.

Confusingly, his father Maurice was granted the lordship of Offelan in north County Kildare in 1175 by Strongbow.

== Family ==
Gerald FitzMaurice was born in Wales in about 1150, the second-eldest son of Maurice FitzGerald, Lord of Llanstephan by his wife, Alice (daughter of Arnulf de Montgomery). Gerald had one sister, Nesta, who was named after their celebrated grandmother, Princess Nest ferch Rhys, and five brothers, including the eldest, William FitzMaurice, 1st Baron of Naas.

== Career ==
Gerald's father was the leader of the first landing of Normans who arrived in Ireland in 1169 to assist the exiled Irish king of Leinster Dermot MacMurrough regain his kingdom. Accompanying his father from Wales to Ireland, he and his brother Alexander showed great valour in the battle against Roderick O'Conor outside the walls of Dublin in 1171. Upon the death of their father, on 1 September 1176, Gerald's elder brother William granted him half the cantred of Ophelan with centres at Maynooth and Rathmore. He was confirmed in them by Prince John in 1185.

William FitzAldelm deprived Gerald and his brothers of their stronghold of Wicklow, though, after a time, was compelled to give them Ferns in exchange. Gerald had already received, from Strongbow, Naas and other districts in what became County Kildare, and had erected Maynooth Castle.

In 1197, he took part in the conquest of Limerick acquiring Croom, County Limerick.

In 1199, though receiving King John's letters of protection, he was ordered to "do right" to Maurice Fitzphilip for the lands of 'Gessil and Lega', that he had taken from Maurice. Between 1185 and 1204, Fitzgerald, had established a settlement at Geashill. Originally of motte-and-bailey design, it was a timber castle on an earthen mound, nearby were located the church and tenant dwellings. On his death Gerald was still in possession of those estates. In the 15th century the wooded fortress at Geashill was replaced by a stone tower house. Today, only the west wall of the castle remains.

He is often described as 'Baron Offaly', the middle cantred of which had been among his father's possessions. He died around 15 January 1204.

Gerald is described by his cousin, Giraldus Cambrensis, as small in stature, but distinguished for prudence and honesty. He was the patrilineal ancestor of the earls of Kildare.

== Marriage and issue ==
Sometime around 1193, he married as her first husband, Eve de Bermingham (died between June 1223 and December 1226), daughter of Sir Robert de Bermingham. In marriage, he received the barony of Offaly, becoming the first FitzGerald Lord of Offaly. Together Gerald and Eve had one son:

- Maurice FitzGerald, 2nd Lord of Offaly, Justiciar of Ireland (1194 – 20 May 1257), married Juliana de Grenville, by whom he had four sons.

Following Gerald's death on 15 January 1204, Eve would go on to marry two more times. Her second husband was Geoffrey FitzRobert, and her third, whom she married sometime after 1211, was Geoffrey de Marisco, Justiciar of Ireland.
