= Maud de Prendergast =

13th-century Norman-Irish noblewoman

- Lady of Offaly
- Born: 17 March 1242; Ireland
- Died: before 1273
- Noble family: Prendergast
- Spouses: David FitzMaurice; Maurice de Rochford; Maurice FitzGerald, 3rd Lord of Offaly, Justiciar of Ireland
- Issue: Juliana FitzMaurice, Lady of Thomond; Amabel FitzMaurice
- Father: Sir Gerald de Prendergast
- Mother: Matilda de Burgh

Maud de Prendergast, Lady of Offaly (17 March 1242 – before 1273), was a Norman-Irish noblewoman, the first wife of Maurice FitzGerald, 3rd Lord of Offaly, Justiciar of Ireland, and the mother of his two daughters, Juliana FitzGerald and Amabel. She married twice; Maurice FitzGerald, 3rd Lord of Offaly was her second husband.

== Family ==
Maud was born in Ireland on 17 March 1242, the daughter of Sir Gerald de Prendergast of Beauvoir (died 1251), and his second wife, Matilda, daughter of Richard Mor de Burgh and Egidia de Lacy.

Maud had an elder half-sister, Marie de Prendergast from her father's first marriage to Maud Walter. Marie was the wife of Sir John de Cogan by whom she had issue. Maud's paternal grandparents were Philip de Prendergast, Lord of Enniscorthy, Constable of Leinster, and Maud de Quincy, a granddaughter of Strongbow, through the latter's illegitimate daughter Basilie de Clare who married Robert de Quincy, Constable of Leinster.

Her great-grandfather, Maurice de Prendergast, Lord Prendergast had played a prominent part in the Cambro-Norman invasion of Ireland led by Strongbow, and was rewarded with much land in counties Wexford, Waterford, Tipperary, Mayo, Wicklow, and Cork.

== Marriages and issue ==
When she was a young child, Maud was betrothed to David FitzMaurice, who died after 17 March 1249. Her first husband was Maurice de Rochford with whom she had issue. Following Maurice de Rochford's death which occurred sometime before May 1258, she married her second and last husband, Maurice FitzGerald, 3rd Lord of Offaly, Justiciar of Ireland (1238–1286). Pope Alexander IV instructed the bishop of Cloyne “not to molest Maurice son of Maurice, who has appealed to the Pope, on the ground that he married Matilda, daughter of Gerald de Prendergast, she having been espoused to his late brother David who died before she was seven years old.” Maurice was the son of Maurice FitzGerald, 2nd Lord of Offaly and Juliana.

Together Maurice and Maud had two daughters:

- Juliana FitzMaurice (c.1263 Dublin, Ireland - 24 September 1300), married firstly Thomas de Clare, Lord of Thomond, by whom she had four children; she married secondly Nicholas Avenel; she married thirdly Adam de Cretynges.
- Amabel FitzMaurice, married, but was childless.

Maud died on an unknown date. In 1273, her husband Maurice married his second wife, Emmeline Longespee (1252–1291) but fathered no children by her.

== Ancestry ==
Ancestors of Maud de Prendergast

de Prendergast
Maurice de Prendergast, Lord Prendergast
Philip de Prendergast, Lord of Enniscorthy
N. N. FitzGerald
Sir Gerald de Prendergast
Saer I de Quincy
Robert de Quincy
Matilda de St. Liz
Maud de Quincy
Richard de Clare, 2nd Earl of Pembroke "Strongbow"
Basilie de Clare
Unnamed mistress
Maud de Prendergast
Walter de Burgh "FitzAdelm"
William de Burgh
Joan Ponchard
Richard Mor de Burgh
Domnall Mór Ua Briain, King of Thomond
Princess (Ní Briain) of Thomond
Orlachan MacMurrough of Leinster
Matilda de Burgh
Hugh de Lacy, Lord of Meath
Walter de Lacy, Lord of Trim
Rohese of Monmouth
Egidia de Lacy
William de Braose, 4th Lord of Bramber
Margaret de Braose
Maud de St. Valery

== Sources ==
- The Complete Peerage, Vol. VII, p. 200
