= Theobald Walter, 1st Chief Butler of Ireland =

Anglo-Norman nobleman in Ireland (1165–1206)

Theobald Walter
- Born: 1165; Norfolk, England
- Died: 4 February 1206 (aged 40–41); Wicklow, Ireland
- Occupation(s): Sheriff of Lancaster; Chief Butler of England and Ireland
- Spouse: Maud le Vavasour
- Children: Theobald le Botiller; Maud le Botiller; Beatrice le Botiller
- Parent(s): Hervey Walter; Maud de Valoignes

Theobald Walter (sometimes Theobald FitzWalter, Theobald Butler, or Theobald Walter le Boteler) was the first Chief Butler of Ireland. He also held the office of Chief Butler of England and was the High Sheriff of Lancashire for 1194. Theobald was the first to use the surname Butler of the Butler family of Ireland. He was involved in the Irish campaigns of King Henry II of England and John of England. His eldest brother Hubert Walter became the Archbishop of Canterbury and justiciar and Lord Chancellor of England.

== Family ==
Theobald was the son of Hervey Walter and his wife, Matilda de Valoignes, who was one of the daughters of Theobald de Valoignes. Their children were Theobald, Hubert—future Chief Justiciar and Archbishop of Canterbury—Bartholomew, Roger, and Hamon. Theobald Walter and his brother Hubert were brought up by their uncle Ranulf de Glanvill, the great justiciar of Henry II of England who had married his mother's sister Bertha.

== Career ==
On 25 April 1185, Prince John, in his new capacity as "Lord of Ireland" landed at Waterford and around this time granted the hereditary office of butler of Ireland to Theobald, whereby he and his successors were to attend the Kings of England at their coronation, and on that day present them with the first cup of wine. Theobald's father had been the hereditary holder of the office of butler of England. Some time after, King Henry II of England granted him the prisage of wines, to enable him, and his heirs, the better to support the dignity of that office. By this grant, he had two tuns (barrels) of wine out of every ship, which broke bulk in any trading port of Ireland, and was loaded with 20 tons of that commodity, and one ton from 9 to 20. Theobald accompanied John on his progress through Munster and Leinster. At this time he was also granted a large section of the north-eastern part of the Kingdom of Limerick. The grant of five and a half cantreds was bounded by:

...the borough of Killaloe and the half cantred of Trucheked Maleth in which it lay, and the cantreds of Elykarval, Elyochgardi, Euermond, Aros and Wedene, and Woedeneoccadelon and Wodeneoidernan.

These are the modern baronies of Tullough (in County Clare), Clonlisk and Ballybritt (in County Offaly), Eliogarty, Ormond Upper, Ormond Lower, Owney and Arra (in County Tipperary), Owneybeg, Clanwilliam and Coonagh (in County Limerick).

Theobald was active in the war that took place when Rory O'Connor attempted to regain his throne after retiring to the monastery of Cong, as Theobald's men were involved in the death of Donal Mor McCarthy during a parley in 1185 near Cork. In 1194 Theobald supported his brother during Hubert's actions against Prince John, with Theobald receiving the surrender of John's supporters in Lancaster. Theobald was rewarded with the office of sheriff of Lancaster, which he held until Christmas of 1198. He was again sheriff after John took the throne in 1199.

In early 1200, however, John deprived Theobald of all his offices and lands because of his irregularities as sheriff. His lands were not restored until January 1202. A manuscript in the National Library of Ireland points to William de Braose, 4th Lord of Bramber as the agent of his restoration:

Grant by William de Braosa, (senior) to Theobald Walter (le Botiller) the burgh of Kildelon (Killaloe) ... the cantred of Elykaruel (the baronies of Clonlisk and Ballybrit, County Offaly), Eliogarty, Ormond, Ara and Oioney, etc. 1201.

"Elykaruel" refers to the Gaelic tuath of "Ely O'Carroll", which straddled the southern part of County Offaly and the northern part of Tipperary (at Ikerrin). The other cantreds named are probably the modern baronies of Eliogarty, Ormond Upper, Ormond Lower and Owney and Arra in County Tipperary.

Theobald founded the Abbey of Woney, in the townland of Abington (Irish: Mainistir Uaithne, meaning "the monastery of Uaithne"), of which nothing now remains, near the modern village of Murroe in County Limerick Ireland around 1200. He also founded the Cockersand Abbey in Lancaster, Abbey of Nenagh in County Tipperary, and a monastic house at Arklow in County Wicklow.

== Marriage and children ==
Theobald married Maud le Vavasour (1176–1226), heiress of Robert le Vavasour, a baron of Yorkshire, John Lodge in the Peerage of Ireland in 1789 gave the year as 1189, but on no apparent authority, as no other author follows him on this. Their children were Theobald le Botiller, 2nd Chief Butler of Ireland and Maud.

Theobald died on 4 February 1206 at Arklow Castle and was buried at Wotheney Abbey.
