= Leinster =

Traditional province in the east of Ireland

Coordinates: 53°20′52″N 6°15′35″W

Leinster Laighin (Irish)
- Flag Coat of arms

- State: Ireland
- Counties: Carlow; Dublin; Kildare; Kilkenny; Laois; Longford; Louth; Meath; Offaly; Westmeath; Wexford; Wicklow

Area
  - Total: 19,801 km^{2} (7,645 sq mi)
  - Rank: 3rd

Population (2022)
  - Total: 2,870,354
  - Rank: 1st
  - Density: 144.96/km^{2} (375.44/sq mi)
- Time zone: UTC±0 (WET)
  - Summer (DST): UTC+1 (IST)
- Eircode routing keys: Beginning with A, C, D, K, N, R, W, Y (primarily)
- Telephone area codes: 01, 04x, 05x, 090 (primarily)
- ISO 3166 code: IE-L

Leinster (/ˈlɛnstər/ LEN-stər; Irish: Laighin [ˈl̪ˠəinʲ] or Cúige Laighean [ˌkuːɟə ˈl̪ˠəinˠ]) is one of the four provinces of Ireland, in the east of the island.

The modern province comprises the ancient Kingdoms of Meath, Leinster and Osraige, which existed during Gaelic Ireland. Following the 12th-century Norman invasion of Ireland, the historic "fifths" of Leinster and Meath gradually merged, mainly due to the impact of the Pale, which straddled both, thereby forming the present-day province of Leinster. The ancient kingdoms were shired into a number of counties for administrative and judicial purposes. In later centuries, local government legislation has prompted further sub-division of the historic counties.

Leinster has no official function for local-government purposes. However, it is an officially recognised subdivision of Ireland and is listed on ISO 3166-2 as one of the four provinces of Ireland. "IE-L" is attributed to Leinster as its country sub-division code. Leinster had a population of 2,858,501 according to the preliminary results of the 2022 census, making it the most populous province in the country. The traditional flag of Leinster features a golden harp on a green background.

== History ==
=== Early history ===
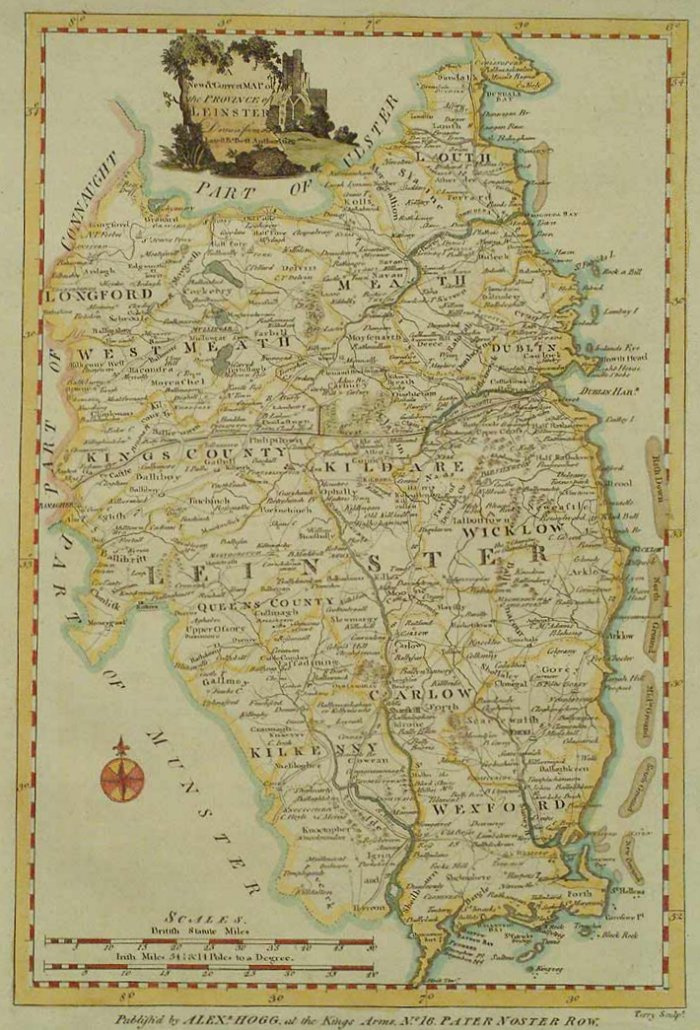
Leinster, province of Ireland (Hogg, 1784)

The Gaelic Kingdom of Leinster before 1171, considerably smaller than the present-day province, usually did not include certain territories such as Meath, Osraige or the Viking cities of Wexford and Dublin.

The first part of the name Leinster derives from Laigin, the name of a major tribe that once inhabited the area. The latter part of the name derives either from the Irish tír or from the Old Norse staðr, both of which translate as 'land' or 'territory'.

Úgaine Mór (Hugony the Great), who supposedly built the hill fort of Dún Ailinne, near Kilcullen in County Kildare, united the tribes of Leinster. He is a likely, but uncertain, candidate as the first historical king of Laigin (Leinster) in the 7th century BC. Circa 175/185 AD, following a period of civil wars in Ireland, the legendary Cathair Mor re-founded the kingdom of Laigin. The legendary Finn Mac Cool, or Fionn mac Cumhaill, reputedly built a stronghold at the Hill of Allen, on the edge of the Bog of Allen.

In the 4th and 5th centuries AD, after Magnus Maximus had left Britain in 383 AD with his legions, leaving a power vacuum, colonists from Laigin settled in North Wales, specifically in Anglesey, Carnarvonshire and Denbighshire. In Wales some of the Leinster-Irish colonists left their name on the Llŷn Peninsula (in Gwynedd), which derives its name from Laigin.

In the 5th century, the emerging Uí Néill dynasties from Connacht conquered areas of Westmeath, Meath and Offaly from the Uí Enechglaiss and Uí Failge of the Laigin. Uí Néill Ard Rígh attempted to exact the Boroimhe Laighean (cattle-tribute) from the Laigin from that time, in the process becoming their traditional enemies.

By the 8th century the rulers of Laigin had split into two dynasties:

- Northern Leinster dynasty: Murchad mac Brain (d. 727), King of Uí Dúnlainge, and joint leader of the Laigin
- Southern Leinster dynasty: Áed mac Colggen (d. 738), King of Uí Cheinnselaig, and joint leader of the Laigin

After the death of the last Kildare-based King of Laigin, Murchad Mac Dunlainge in 1042, the kingship of Leinster reverted to the Uí Cheinnselaig sept based in the southeast in present-day County Wexford. This southern dynasty provided all the later Kings of Leinster.

=== Kingdom of Ireland period ===
Leinster includes the extended "English Pale", counties controlled directly from Dublin, at the beginning of the 1600s. The other three provinces had their own regional "Presidency" systems, based on a Welsh model of administration, in theory if not in fact, from the 1570s and 1580s up to the 1670s, and were considered separate entities. Gradually "Leinster" subsumed the term "The Pale", as the kingdom was pacified and the difference between the old Pale area and the wider province, now also under English administration, grew less distinct.

The expansion of the province took in the territory of the ancient Kingdom of Mide encompassing much of present-day counties Meath, Westmeath and Longford with five west County Offaly baronies. Local lordships were incorporated during the Tudor conquest of Ireland and subsequent plantation schemes.

Other boundary changes included County Louth, officially removed from Ulster in 1596, the baronies of Ballybritt and Clonlisk (formerly Éile Uí Chearbhaill in the county palatine of Tipperary) in Munster becoming part of Leinster in 1606, and the 'Lands of Ballymascanlon' transferred from Armagh to Louth c. 1630. The provincial borders were redrawn by Cromwell for administration and military reasons, and the Offaly parishes of Annally and Lusmagh, formerly part of Connacht, were transferred in 1660.

The last major boundary changes within Leinster occurred with the formation of County Wicklow (1603–1606), from lands in the north of Carlow (which previously extended to the sea) and most of southern Dublin. Later minor changes dealt with "islands" of one county in another. By the late 1700s, Leinster looked as shown in the above map of 1784.

== Geography and subdivisions ==
=== Counties ===
The province is divided into twelve traditional counties: Carlow, Dublin, Kildare, Kilkenny, Laois, Longford, Louth, Meath, Offaly, Westmeath, Wexford and Wicklow. Leinster has the most counties of any province, but is the second smallest of the four Irish provinces by land area. With a population of 2,870,354 as of 2022, it is the island's most populous province. Dublin is the only official city in the province, and is by far its largest settlement.

| County | Population (2022) | Area |
|---|---|---|
| Carlow (Ceatharlach) | 61,968 | 897 km^{2} (346 sq mi) |
| Dublin (Baile Átha Cliath) | 1,458,154 | 922 km^{2} (356 sq mi) |
| Kildare (Cill Dara) | 247,774 | 1,695 km^{2} (654 sq mi) |
| Kilkenny (Cill Chainnigh) | 104,160 | 2,073 km^{2} (800 sq mi) |
| Laois (Laois) | 91,877 | 1,720 km^{2} (660 sq mi) |
| Longford (An Longfort) | 46,751 | 1,091 km^{2} (421 sq mi) |
| Louth (Lú) | 139,703 | 826 km^{2} (319 sq mi) |
| Meath (An Mhí) | 220,826 | 2,342 km^{2} (904 sq mi) |
| Offaly (Uíbh Fhailí) | 83,150 | 2,001 km^{2} (773 sq mi) |
| Westmeath (An Iarmhí) | 96,221 | 1,840 km^{2} (710 sq mi) |
| Wexford (Loch Garman) | 163,919 | 2,367 km^{2} (914 sq mi) |
| Wicklow (Cill Mhantáin) | 155,851 | 2,027 km^{2} (783 sq mi) |
| Total | 2,870,354 | 19,801 km^{2} (7,645 sq mi) |

=== Large settlements ===
As of the 2016 census, the larger settlements in Leinster included:

| # | Settlement | County | Municipal District Pop. | Settlement Pop. | Former Legal Town Pop. |
|---|---|---|---|---|---|
| 1 | Dublin City | County Dublin | 1,347,359 | 1,173,179 | 554,554 |
| 2 | Dundalk | County Louth | 55,806 | 39,004 | 32,520 |
| 3 | Kilkenny | County Kilkenny | 52,172 | 26,512 | 9,842 |
| 4 | Drogheda | County Louth | 44,052 | 40,956 | 31,785 |
| 5 | Swords | County Dublin | 42,738 | 39,248 | 36,924 |
| 6 | Bray | County Wicklow | 35,531 | 32,600 | 27,709 |
| 7 | Navan | County Meath | 34,931 | 30,173 | 30,097 |
| 8 | Carlow | County Carlow | 34,846 | 24,272 | 14,425 |

== Culture ==
=== Language ===
As is the norm for language in Ireland, English is the primary spoken language, but there is an active Irish-speaking minority in the province. According to the Census of Ireland of 2011, there were 18,947 daily speakers of Irish in Leinster outside the education system, including 1,299 native speakers in the small Gaeltacht of Ráth Chairn. As of 2011, there were 19,348 students attending the 66 Gaelscoils (Irish-language primary schools) and 15 Gaelcholáistí (Irish-language secondary schools) in the province, primarily in the Dublin area.

=== Sport ===
A number of sporting and cultural organisations organise themselves on provincial lines, including Leinster Rugby, the Leinster Cricket Union, Leinster Hockey Association and Leinster GAA. While Leinster GAA is made up primarily of the traditional counties of the province, GAA teams from Galway, Kerry and Antrim have played in the Leinster Senior Hurling Championship, as has a team from London; Galway won the title in 2012. Participation of these counties is based on their performances in the Christy Ring Cup.

== See also ==
- Laigin
- Kingdom of Leinster, List of kings of Leinster
- Ó Laighin
- Duke of Leinster
- Leinster House
- Leinster (European Parliament constituency)
- New Leinster Province
