= Kinalehin Friary =

Ruined Franciscan friary in Galway, Ireland

- Cenél Féichín
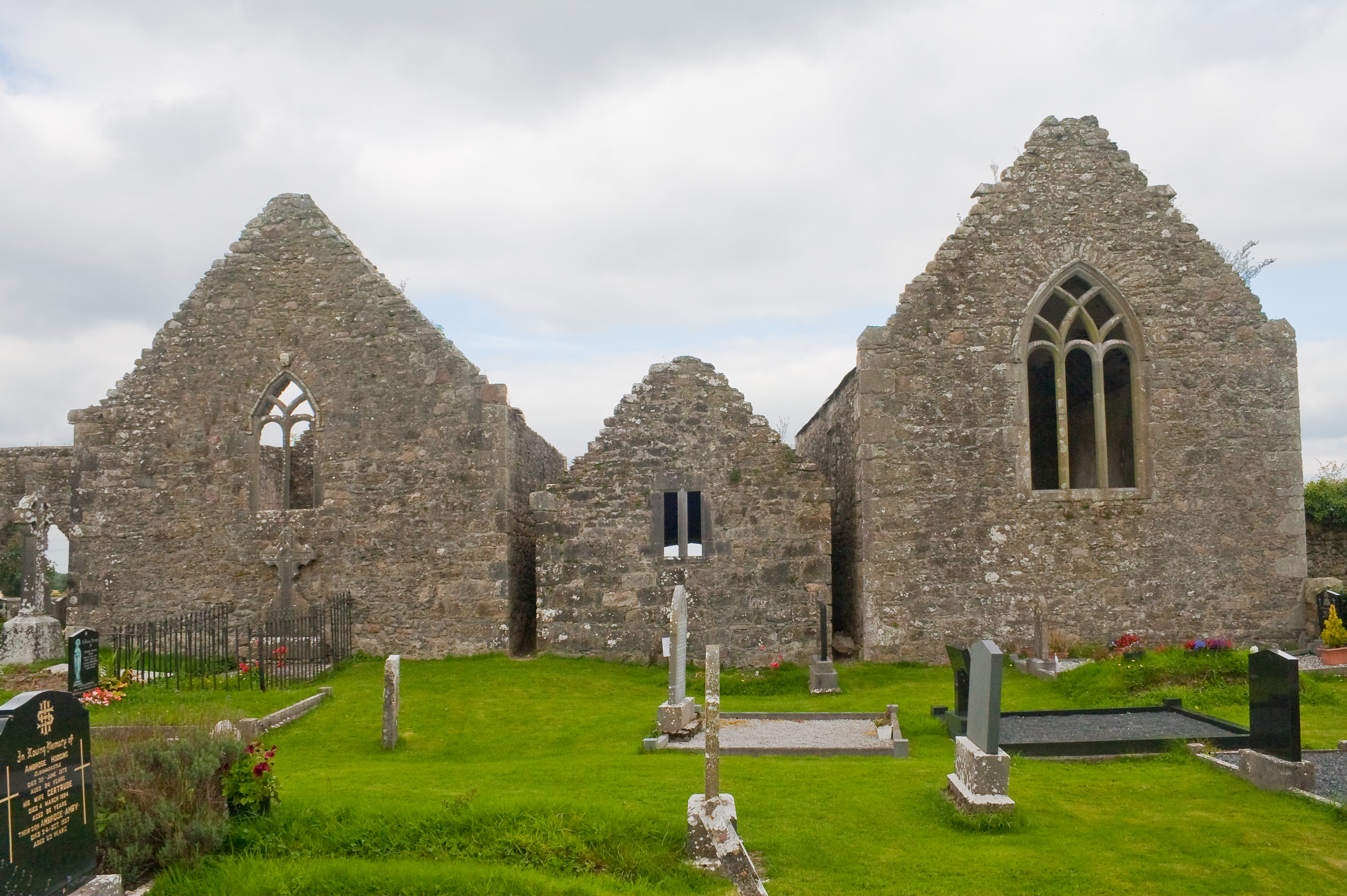
- Side chapels

- Location within Ireland
- Interactive map of Kinalehin Friary

Monastery information
- Other names: Domo dei; Kilnalahan; Kinaleghin; Kenaloyn; Cenel-Feichin; Cineoil-Feichin; Kilnalekin; Kinelfeichin
- Order: Carthusian Order (c.1252–c.1341); Order of Friars Minor Conventual (c.1371–1540); Observant Franciscan Friars (1611–1700s)
- Established: c.1252; refounded c.1371, 1611
- Disestablished: c.1341, 1540, 1700s
- Mother house: Hinton Charterhouse (Carthusian era)
- Diocese: Clonfert

People
- Founder: John de Cogan

Architecture
- Status: Inactive
- Style: Late Gothic, Romanesque

Site
- Location: Friary, Abbey, County Galway
- Coordinates: 53.102644°N 8.392537°W
- Visible remains: abbey church, cloister
- Public access: yes

Kinalehin Friary (also Kinaleghin; Irish: Mainistir Chineál Fhéichín), originally a medieval charterhouse or Carthusian monastery and later a Franciscan friary, is a National Monument located in County Galway, Ireland.

Kinalehin Charterhouse was Ireland's only Carthusian monastery.

== Location ==
Kinalehin Friary is located 6.7 km (4.2 mi) west of Ballyshrule, northwest of Lough Derg and south of the Duniry River.

== History ==
Kinalehin was founded c. 1252 by John de Cogan for the Carthusians. The first monks came over from Hinton Charterhouse and/or Witham Friary, both located in Somerset. It was purportedly destroyed in 1279 and if so, rebuilt soon after.

In 1306 Kinalehin was sold to the Knights Hospitaller, but the sale appears never to have completed. It was dissolved by the General Chapter (Grande Chartreuse) in 1321 and the diocese of Clonfert took possession in 1341.

Around 1371 Pope Gregory XI granted permission to the de Burgos to refound it, this time with the Order of Friars Minor Conventual.

Kinalehin was shut down in the Dissolution of the Monasteries of 1540. The monastic lands were purchased from Elizabeth I by Richard Burke, 2nd Earl of Clanricarde, who retained it for the friars. It was dissolved before 1609.

It was again refounded in 1611 for the Observant Franciscan Friars. In 1629 An Leabhar Breac, a famous manuscript of the 15th century, was held at Kinalehin.

The friars were expelled after the Cromwellian conquest but returned during the time of Charles II.

== Buildings ==
The archaeological remains are mainly Franciscan, although some Carthusian elements remain as earthworks.

The surviving remains consist of cloister, choir and three chapels.

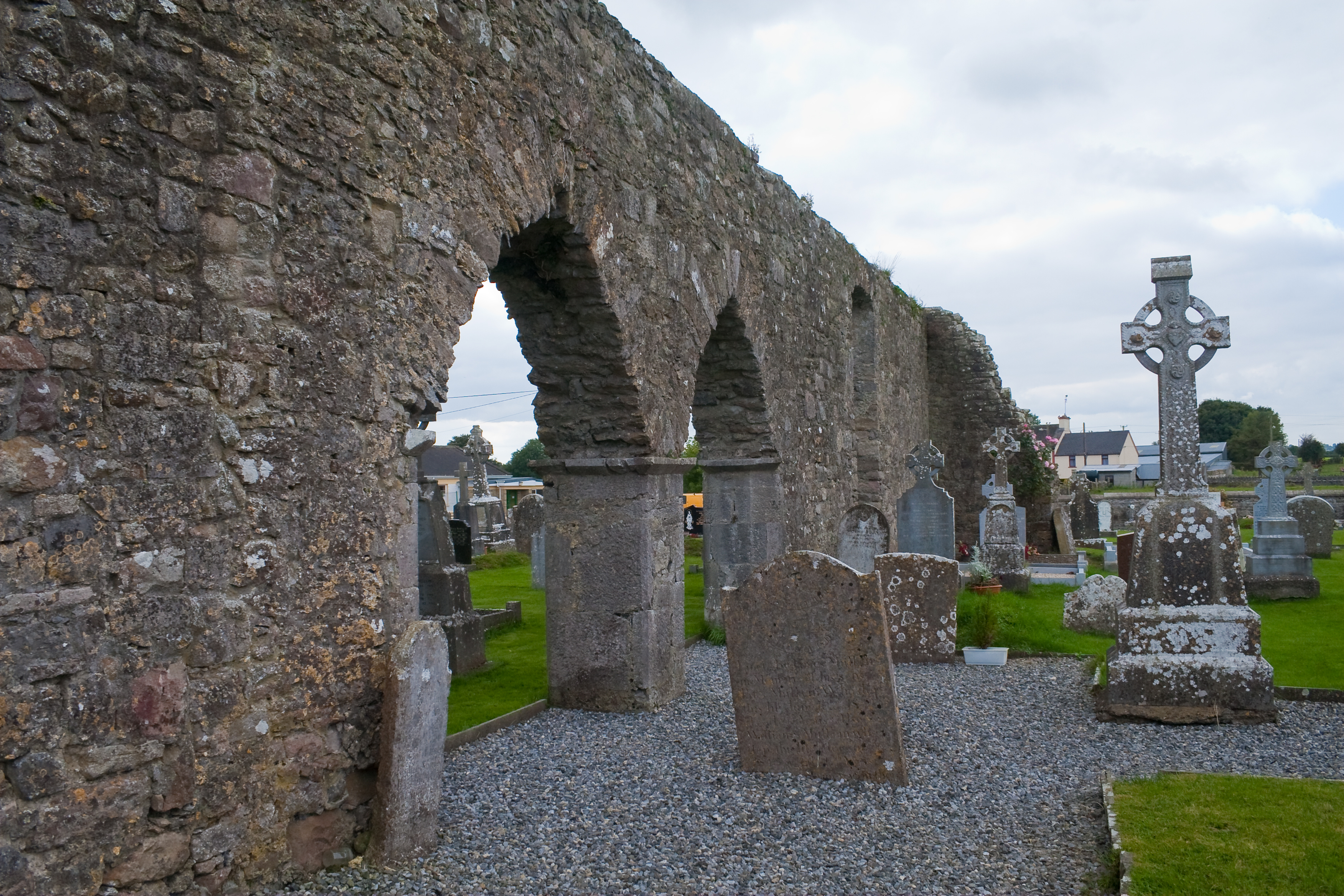
nave arches

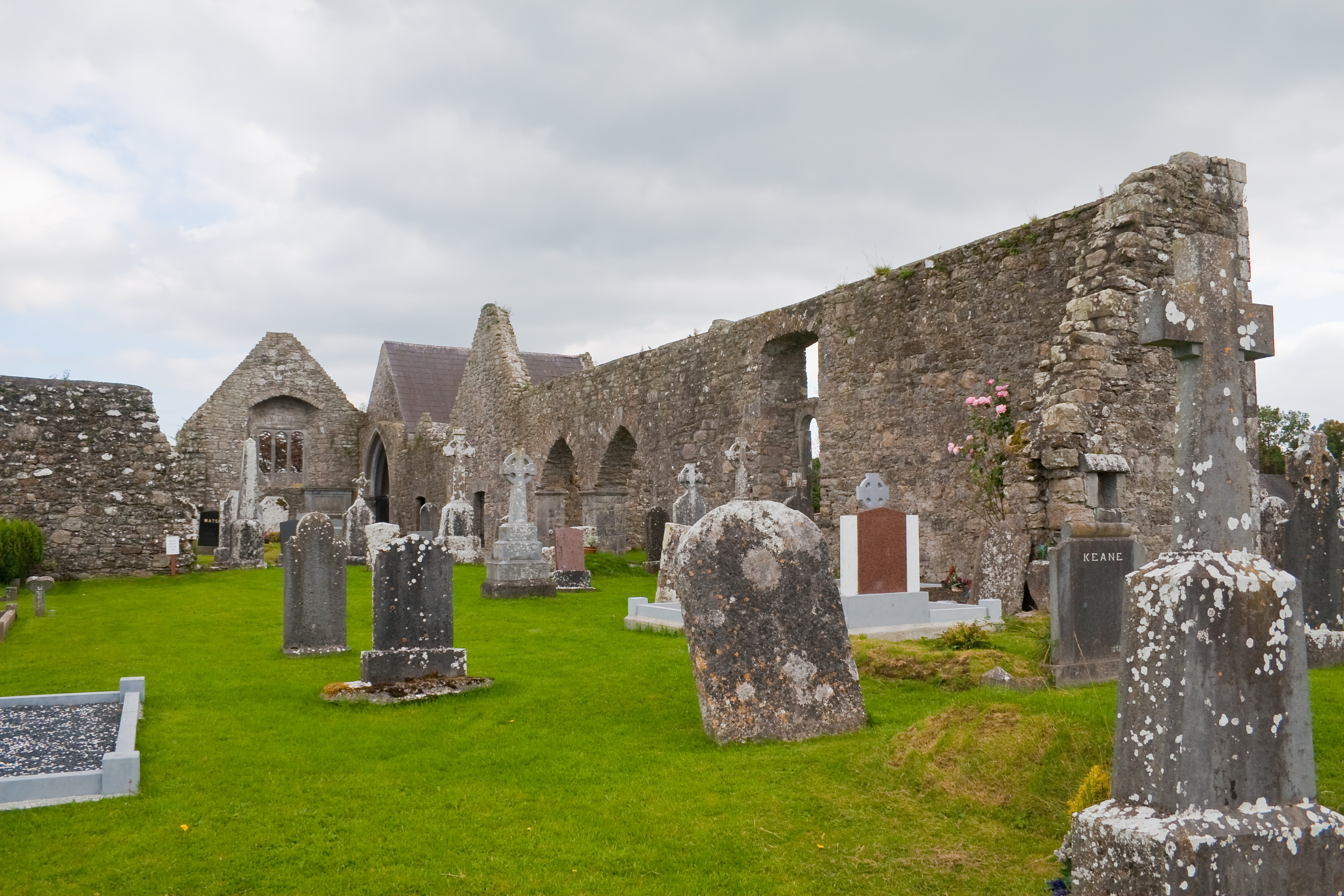

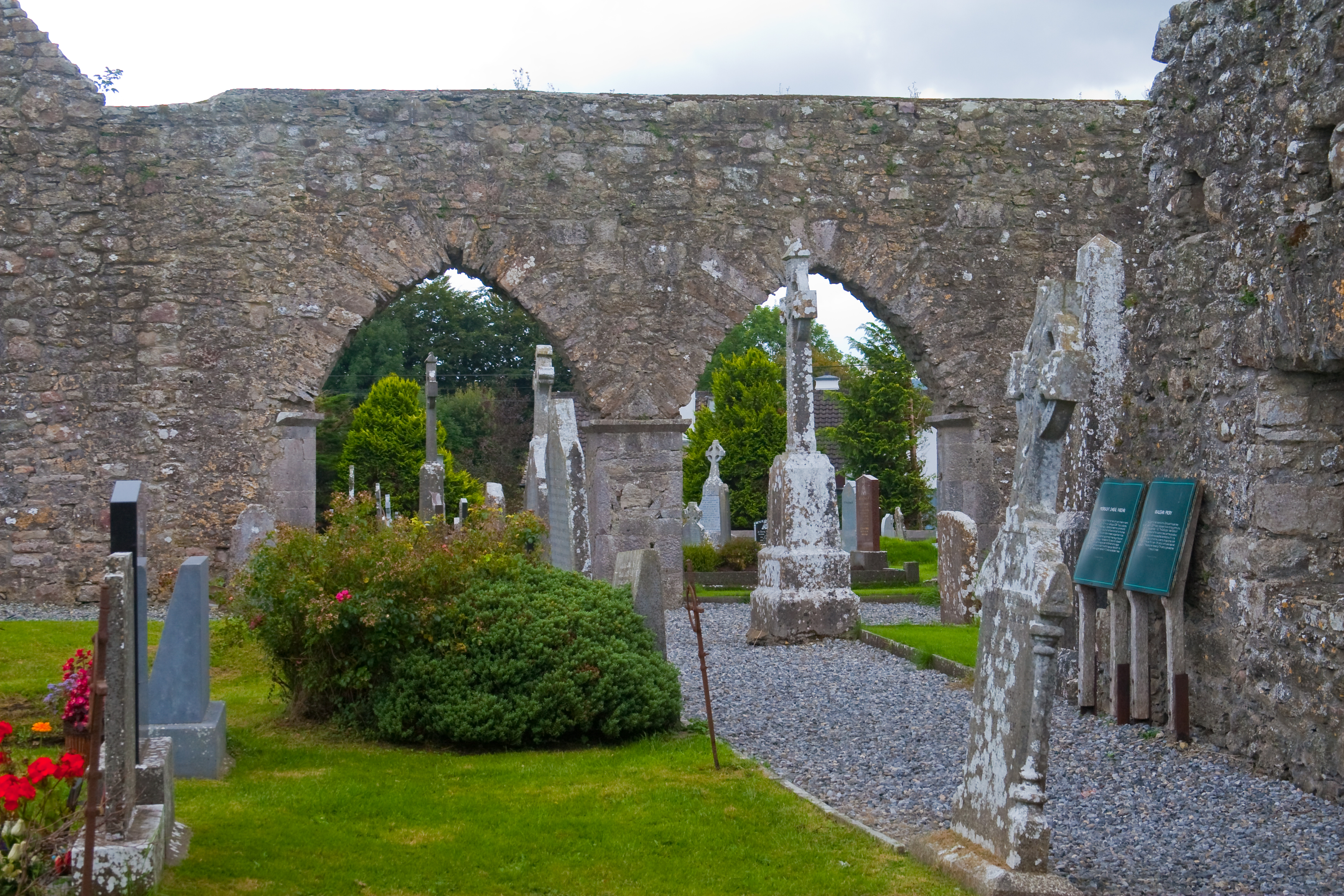
Cloister and arches

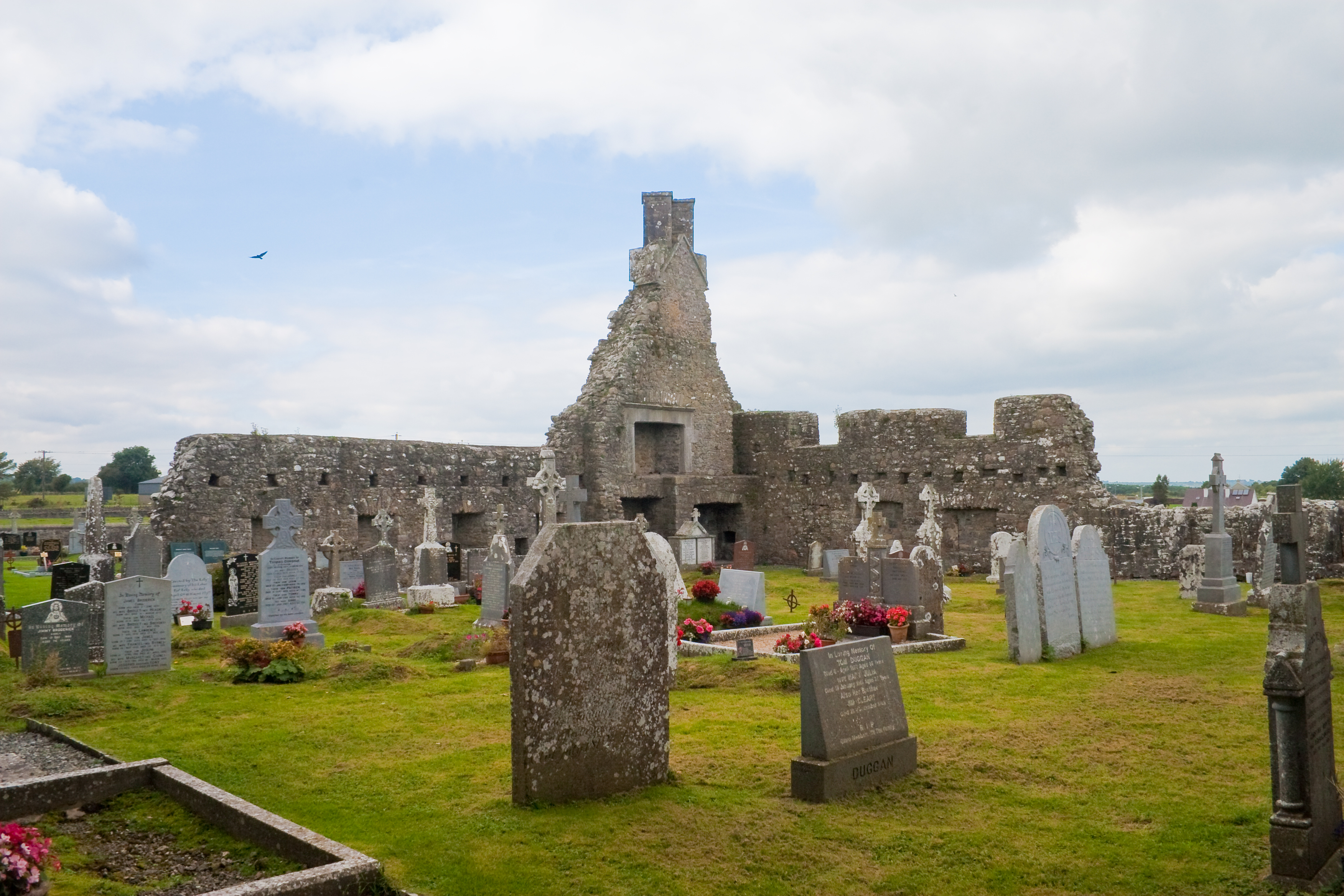
Cloister and remnants of tower, with fireplace visible
