= Maurice FitzGerald, 3rd Lord of Offaly =

13th-century Irish nobleman

Maurice FitzMaurice FitzGerald
- Justiciar of Ireland
- Born: 1238; Wexford, Ireland
- Died: Before 10 November 1286; Ross, County Wexford, Ireland
- Spouse(s): Maud de Prendergast; Emmeline Longespee
- Issue: by Maud de Prendergast Juliana FitzMaurice, Lady of Thomond Amabel FitzMaurice by Emmeline Longespee no issue
- Father: Maurice FitzGerald, 2nd Lord of Offaly
- Mother: Juliana de Grenville

Maurice FitzMaurice FitzGerald (1238 – 2 September 1277) was an Irish magnate, soldier, and Justiciar of Ireland from 1272 to 1273. His family would come to epitomise the ideal of cultural synthesis in Ireland, becoming "more Irish than the Irish themselves", fusing Gaelic and Norman customs in Irish identity. "But others say he never enjoyed that lordship himself, but that it passed to the son and grandson of his eldest brother Gerald."

== Career ==
He was born in 1238 in Wexford, Ireland, the second son of Maurice FitzGerald, 2nd Lord of Offaly and Juliana de Grenville. He had three brothers, Gerald fitz Maurice II (died 1243), Thomas fitz Maurice (died 1271), and David fitz Maurice (died without issue). Maurice was known by the nickname of Maurice Mael (from an old word meaning "devotee" in Irish). He was granted his father's lands in Connacht in exchange for quitclaiming the barony of Offaly sometime before 20 May 1257, when his father Maurice FitzGerald II died at Youghal Monastery.

Before his father died, Maurice was custos of Offaly, but after the 2nd Lord of Offaly died, the countess of Lincoln, Margaret de Quincy, sued him for custody of Offaly.

Terrible feuds raged in his time between the Geraldines and the DeBurghs. Maurice FitzMaurice and his nephew John, son of his brother Thomas, captured the justiciar, Richard de la Rochelle, Theobald Butler IV, and John de Cogan I (whose son was married to Maurice FitzGerald III's sister, Juliana). The capture of the three magnates led to a private war in Ireland, with the Geraldines on one side and Walter de Burgh and Geoffrey de Geneville on the other. However, the Second Barons' War in England forced them to come to a temporary peace while they battled Montfortians in the English Midlands in 1266.

In May 1265, Maurice FitzMaurice was among the chief magnates in Ireland summoned to inform King Henry III of England and his son Prince Edward about conditions in the country, and again in June 1265. These were the result of the private war between the Geraldines and Walter de Burgh, lord of Connacht (who was later made the 1st Earl of Ulster). Maurice was appointed Justiciar of Ireland on 23 June 1272 following the accidental death of his predecessor, James de Audley, on 11 June of that year; his father had served in the same capacity from 1232 to 1245. Maurice himself held the post until September 1273, when he was succeeded by Sir Geoffrey de Geneville, Seigneur de Vaucouleurs.

He held four knight's fees in both Lea and Geashill from Roger Mortimer, 1st Baron Mortimer, who had inherited them from his wife, Maud de Braose.

In 1276, he led a force of men from Connacht against the Irish of County Wicklow. Maurice's contingent joined the main army of English settlers jointly commanded by his son-in-law, Thomas de Clare, Lord of Inchiquin and Youghal, who had been made Lord of Thomond earlier that same year, and Sir Geoffrey de Geneville, Maurice's successor as Justiciar of Ireland. The English under Thomas de Clare and Geoffrey de Geneville attacked the Irish at Glenmalure, but were defeated and suffered heavy losses.

== Marriages and issue ==
Shortly before 28 October 1259, he married his first wife, Maud de Prendergast, daughter of Sir Gerald de Prendergast of Beauvoir and Matilda de Burgh, daughter of Richard Mor de Burgh. Together he and Maud had two daughters:

- Juliana FitzMaurice (d. 24 September 1300), married firstly, Thomas de Clare, Lord of Thomond, by whom she had four children; she married secondly Nicholas Avenel, and thirdly, Adam de Cretynges.
- Amabel FitzMaurice, married but died childless.

Maurice was Maud's third husband. She died on an unknown date. In 1273, Maurice married his second wife, Emmeline Longespee (1252–1291), daughter of Stephen Longespée and Emmeline de Ridelsford. He and Emeline had no issue.

Maurice died 2 September 1277, at Ross, County Wexford. Emmeline Longespee then fought until her death to claim her dower against her daughter, Juliana, her step-daughter, Amabilia, and John FitzGerald, who would be created 1st Earl of Kildare on 14 May 1316. John was the son of his brother Thomas by Rohesia de St. Michael. John sued or physically took lands from the bailiffs of Emmeline, Juliana, and Amabilia.

There is some confusion as to whether Gerald Fitzmaurice FitzGerald was the first or second son of Maurice FitzGerald, 2nd Lord of Offaly. Most, like M. Hickson, of the RSAI say he was the eldest. Lord Walter FitzGerald says he was the second. In any event, he predeceased his father in 1243. His son, Maurice FitzGerald, drowned in the Irish Channel in July 1268. His son was Gerald FitzMaurice III (born 1263). Gerald's marriage was sold to Geoffrey de Geneville, who matched Gerald with his own daughter, Joan, but he died childless on 29 August 1287.

Maurice Fitzmaurice FitzGerald 3rd Earl of Offaly was succeeded by nephew John, son of his younger brother Thomas Fitzmaurice FitzGerald.

== Notes ==
Peerage of Ireland
Political offices
Preceded by James de Audley	Justiciar of Ireland; 1272–1273	Succeeded by Sir Geoffrey de Geneville
