= Maurice FitzGerald, 2nd Lord of Offaly =

Anglo-Norman peer, soldier, and Justiciar of Ireland

Maurice Fitzmaurice FitzGerald I
- Lord of Offaly; Justiciar of Ireland
- Born: 1194; Ireland
- Died: 20 May 1257 (aged 63); Youghal Monastery, Ireland
- Noble family: FitzGerald/FitzMaurice dynasty
- Spouse: Juliana de Grenville
- Issue: Gerald FitzMaurice FitzGerald; Maurice FitzGerald, 3rd Lord of Offaly; David FitzMaurice FitzGerald; Thomas FitzMaurice FitzGerald
- Father: Gerald FitzMaurice, 1st Lord of Offaly
- Mother: Eve de Bermingham

Maurice Fitzmaurice FitzGerald I, 2nd Lord of Offaly (c.1194 – 20 May 1257) was an Anglo-Norman peer, soldier, and Justiciar of Ireland from 1232 to 1245. He mustered many armies against the Irish, and due to his harsh methods as Justiciar, he received criticism from King Henry III of England. He was succeeded as Lord of Offaly by his son, Maurice FitzGerald, 3rd Lord of Offaly.

== Career ==
He was born in Ireland in 1194, the son of Gerald FitzMaurice, 1st Lord of Offaly and Eve de Bermingham (died between June 1223/December 1226). He succeeded to the title of Lord of Offaly on 15 January 1204, and was invested as a knight in July 1217, at the age of 33. In 1224 he founded South Abbey, Youghal, the proto-friary of the Irish Province of the Observant Franciscans, dedicated to St. Nicholas. Maurice was summoned to London to accompany King Henry III of England to Poitou and Gascony in October 1229. He was appointed Justiciar of Ireland in September 1232 and held the post until 1245. His reputation was marred by rumours that he had contrived the death of Richard Marshal, 3rd Earl of Pembroke in 1234. FitzGerald met Marshal at the Battle of the Curragh on 1 April, where Marshal was wounded and died shortly after. It was rumoured that Marshal had been betrayed. FitzGerald then proceeded to London, where he took an oath before Henry III, that he innocent of any participation in Marshal's death. He later founded the Dominican Abbey at Sligo, to house a community of monks to say prayers for Earl Marshal's soul.

In February 1235, the King criticised him for his proceedings in office, and described him as "little pleasant, nay, beyond measure harsh in executing the King's mandates". The same year, he took part in the subjugation of Connacht. In the years 1241 and 1242, and later in 1246, 1247, and 1248 he mustered armies against the Irish. In 1247, Maurice invaded Tír Chonaill, and fought the combined forces of Cineál Chonaill and Cineál Eoghain at the Battle of Ballyshannon. According to various Irish annals, three eminent lords fell in battle against him: Maol Seachlainn Ó Domhnaill, King of Tír Chonaill, An Giolla Muinealach Ó Baoighill, and Mac Somhairle, King of Argyll (a man seemingly identical to Ruaidhrí mac Raghnaill).

In 1245, Maurice was dismissed from his post as Justiciar as a result of tardiness in sending the King assistance in the latter's military campaigns in Wales. His successor was John FitzGeoffrey. That same year he laid the foundations for Sligo Castle. In 1250, he held both the office of Member of the Council of Ireland, and Commissioner of the Treasury. He also founded the Franciscan Friary at Youghal; hence his nickname of an Brathair, which is Irish for The Friar. He was at the English royal court in January 1252, and received an urgent summons from King Henry in January 1254.

== Marriage and issue ==
He married Juliana de Grenville and had four sons:

- Gerald FitzMaurice FitzGerald (died 1243), married a woman whose name is not recorded by whom he had a son, Maurice Roe FitzGerald (drowned July 1268 returning from England when his ship was lost in the Irish Sea), and a daughter, Juliana (died after 1309), wife of Sir John de Cogan, by whom she had issue.
- Maurice FitzGerald, 3rd Lord of Offaly (1238- before 10 November 1286), married firstly, Maud de Prendergast, by whom he had two daughters; he married secondly, Emmeline Longespee.
- David FitzMaurice FitzGerald, died childless
- Thomas FitzMaurice FitzGerald (died 1271 Lough Mask), married Rohesia de St. Michael, by whom he had issue including John FitzGerald, 1st Earl of Kildare, 4th Lord of Offaly

== Death ==
In 1257, Maurice and his Norman army engaged the forces led by Gofraidh Ó Domhnaill (Godfrey O'Donnell), King of Tír Chonaill at the Battle of Credan, in Cairbre Drom Cliabh, now the northern part of County Sligo. The two men fought each other in single combat and both were gravely wounded. Maurice died of his injuries at Youghal Monastery, wearing the habit of the Franciscans, on 20 May 1257, aged 63 years. In the Annals of the Four Masters, 1257 his death is described thus: "Maurice FitzGerald for some time Lord Justice of Ireland and the destroyer of the Irish, died." (In Irish this reads as: "Muiris macGerailt lustis Ereann re h-edh diosccaoilteach Gaoidheal d'écc".)

Upon his death, the properties of Lea, Rathangan, and Geashill passed to his grandson Maurice, son of Gerald Fitzmaurice, who died in 1243.

He was succeeded as Lord of Offaly by his son, Maurice FitzGerald, 3rd Lord of Offaly, rather than the rightful successor, his grandson, Maurice, son of his eldest son, Gerald. "But others say that he never enjoyed that lordship himself, but passed it the son and grandson of his eldest brother Gerald."

== Notes ==
Peerage of Ireland
| Preceded by Gerald FitzMaurice | Lord of Offaly; 1204–1257 | Succeeded by Maurice FitzGerald |
Political offices
| Preceded by Hubert de Burgh | Justiciar of Ireland; 1232–1245 | Succeeded by John FitzGeoffrey |
