= Theobald Butler, 4th Chief Butler of Ireland =

Irish noble (1242–1285)

Theobald Butler, 4th Chief Butler of Ireland (1242 – 26 September 1285) was the son of Theobald Butler, 3rd Chief Butler of Ireland and Margery de Burgh, daughter of Richard Mor de Burgh, 1st Lord of Connacht. He assisted King Edward I of England in his wars in Scotland. He died at the castle of Arklow, County Wicklow, Ireland, and was buried at Arklow Monastery.

== Marriage and children ==
He married Joan FitzJohn in 1268, the fourth and youngest daughter of John Fitzgeoffrey, Lord of Kirtling, Sheriff of Yorkshire, and Isobel Bigod and the granddaughter of Geoffrey FitzPeter, Earl of Essex. She was co-heir with her three sisters to her brothers John and Richard. On her marriage, she brought Theobald the manor of Faubridge in Essex, the hamlet of Shippeley in Hants, the manor of Shire in Surrey, the hamlet of Vacherie and the manor of Ailesbury (in Buckinghamshire). Joan died on 4 April 1303. Their children were:

- Theobald Butler, 5th Chief Butler of Ireland (1269–1299)
- Edmund Butler, Earl of Carrick and 6th Chief Butler of Ireland (1268–1321)
- Thomas Butler, 1st Baron Dunboyne (1271–1329)
- Margaret Butler (1274–1344), she married John de Trenouth
- John Butler (1270–1321)
- Richard Butler (b.1275)
- Gilbert Butler (b.1275)
- Nicholas Butler (b.1277), elected Archbishop of Dublin by the Prior and Convent of the Holy Trinity in January 1306, but was never consecrated.
- James Butler (1278–1337)

== See also ==
- Butler dynasty
