= Gofraid O'Donnell =

Gofraid O'Donnell Gofraidh Ó Domhnaill
- King of Tyrconnell
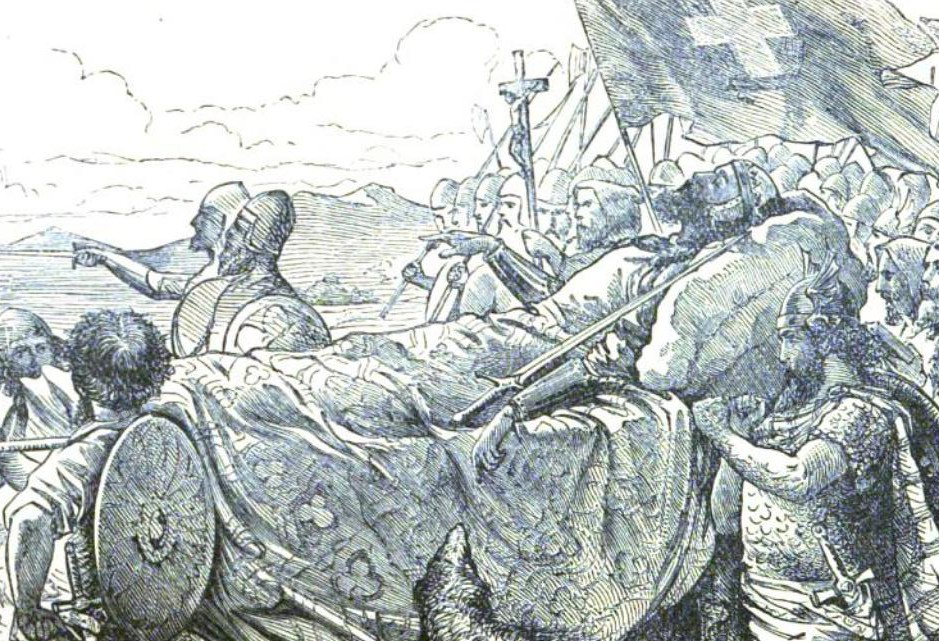
- A.M. Suillivan: The Story of Ireland. Godfrey of Tyrconnell borne into battle.
- Reign: 1247 - 1257
- Successor: Donal Óg O'Donnell
- Died: 1257 near Letterkenny in Ulster in the north of Ireland
- Burial: Conwal, near Letterkenny
- Father: Donall Mor O'Donnell

Gofraid O'Donnell (Irish: Gofraidh Ó Domhnaill) was a king of Tyrconnell and the first chieftain of mark in the O'Donnell dynasty.

== Biography ==
O'Donnell was a son of Donal Mor O'Donnell (died 1241).

O'Donnell rapidly came to power, initially with the support of the FitzGerald dynasty.

In 1248, he was inaugurated as "The O'Donnell", meaning chief of the clan. He made a successful inroad into Tyrone against Brian O'Neill in 1252. In 1257, he drove the Normans out of northern Connacht after the battle of Creadran-Cille, killing Maurice FitzGerald, 2nd Lord of Offaly in personal combat but suffering severe injuries. While still incapacitated by his wound, O'Donnell was summoned by O'Neill to give hostages in token of submission. Carried on a litter at the head of his clan, he gave battle to Brian, whom he defeated with severe loss in prisoners and cattle.

O'Donnell died of his wound immediately afterwards outside of where the town of Letterkenny is today, and was succeeded in the chieftainship by his brother Donal Óg, who returned from Scotland in time to withstand O'Neill's demands.

== Sources ==
- Moore, Norman (1895). "O'Donnell, Godfrey" . In Lee, Sidney (ed.). Dictionary of National Biography. Vol. 41. London: Smith, Elder & Co. p. 435.
