= Battle of Creadran Cille =

13th century battle in Ireland

Date	1257
Location	near Sligo, County Sligo, Ireland 54.356°N 8.615°W
Result	Gaelic Irish victory

Belligerents
Kingdom of Tyrconnell	Lordship of Ireland

Commanders and leaders
Gofraidh Ua Domhaill	Maurice FitzGerald

Strength
Unknown	Unknown

Casualties and losses
Unknown	Unknown

The Battle of Creadran Cille was fought in 1257 between the Irish of Tír Chonaill, led by Gofraidh Ó Domhnaill, and the Anglo-Irish, led by Maurice FitzGerald. It took place at Ros Ceide (Rosses Point) in the territory of Cairbre Drom Cliabh, near Sligo town. The forces of Tír Chonaill were victorious and drove the English out of their territory.

According to the Annals of the Four Masters (English translation):

A brave battle was fought by Godfrey O'Donnell, Lord of Tirconnell, in defence of his country, with the Lord Justice of Ireland, Maurice Fitzgerald, and the other English nobles of Connaught, at Creadran-Cille in Ros-cede, in the territory of Carbury, to the north of Sligo. A desperate and furious battle was fought between them: bodies were mangled, heroes were disabled, and the senses were stunned on both sides. The field was vigorously maintained by the Kinel-Connell, who made such obstinate and vigorous onsets upon the English that, in the end, they routed them with great slaughter. Godfrey himself, however, was severely wounded; for he met Maurice Fitzgerald face to face in single combat, in which they wounded each other severely. In consequence of the success of this battle, the English and the Geraldines were driven out of Lower Connaught.

M1257.14 On the same day Mac Griffin, an illustrious knight, was taken prisoner by O'Donnell's people; and Sligo was afterwards burned and totally plundered by them. Donough, the son of Cormac O'Donnell, was killed in the heat of this battle of Creadran. They (O'Donnell's people) then returned home in consequence of O'Donnell's wounds; but, were it not that his wounds had oppressed him, he would have routed his enemies to the River Moy. Godfrey, on his return, prostrated and demolished the castle which had been erected by the English a short time before, at Cael-uisce, to carry on the war against the Kinel-Connell.

M1257.15 Maurice Fitzgerald, for some time Lord Justice of Ireland, and the destroyer of the Irish, died.
