= Theobald le Botiller, 2nd Chief Butler of Ireland =

Irish noble

Theobald le Botiller, also known as Theobald Butler, 2nd Baron Butler (January 1200 – 19 July 1230) was the son of Theobald Walter, 1st Baron Butler and Maud le Vavasour. He had livery of his lands on 18 July 1222.

== Marriages and children ==
Theobald married Joan du Marais (or Marisco) daughter of Geoffrey du Marais in 1222. Their children were:

- Theobald Butler, 3rd Chief Butler of Ireland (1224-1248). His son married Margery de Burgh, daughter of Richard Mor de Burgh and Egidia de Lacy. (Note: there are several Theobald le Botillers in this line.)

After the death of his wife three years later in 1225, Henry III of England requested the marriage of Theobald to Roesia de Verdun, daughter of Nicholas de Verdun (Verdon) of Alton, Staffordshire and Clementia, daughter of Philip le Boteler, and the widow of William Perceval de Somery. The agreement to marry occurred on 4 September 1225. The marriage is presumed to have followed shortly afterwards. Their children were

- John de Verdun (1226–1274) who inherited the western part of the Lordship of Meath in virtue of his marriage to Margery de Lacy, sister of Maud (or Mathilda) de Lacy, wife of Geoffrey de Geneville, 1st Baron Geneville.
- Matilda (otherwise "Maud") de Verdun, (d. 27 November 1283) who married firstly John FitzAlan, feudal Lord of Clun and Oswestry and, after the death in 1243 of his maternal uncle Hugh d'Aubigny, 5th Earl of Arundel, without heirs, John inherited jure matris the castle and Honour of Arundel. Matilda/Maud de Verdun married secondly Richard de Amundeville, as is made clear in her Inquisition Post Mortem where she is cited as Maud (Late) the wife of Richard de Amundevyl, alias Lady Maud de Verdoun, and mention of manors within her dower that pertained to the Honour of Arundell.
- Isabella de Verdun (1225-1328)
- Nicholas de Verdun (1228-1271)

== Career ==
Theobald was summoned cum equis et armis (Latin: "with horses and arms") to attend the King into Brittany, as "Theobaldus Pincerna" on 26 October 1229. He died on 19 July 1230 in Poitou, France, and was buried in the Abbey of Arklow, County Wicklow.

== See also ==
- Butler dynasty
