= Margery de Burgh =

Medieval Irish noblewoman 1224–1252

- Born: 1224; Galway, Ireland
- Died: 1 March 1252 (aged 27–28)
- Noble family: House of Burgh
- Spouse: Theobald Le Botiller
- Issue: Theobald Le Botiller; Elizabeth Butler (Le Botiller)
- Father: Richard Mor de Burgh, Lord of Connaught
- Mother: Egidia de Lacy

Margery de Burgh (English: /dəˈbɜːr/ də-BUR; 1224–1252) was a Norman-Irish noblewoman and wife of Theobald Butler, 3rd Chief Butler of Ireland. Her father was Richard Mor de Burgh, 1st baron of Connaught.

== Family and lineage ==
Margery de Burgh was born in Galway, Ireland, the eldest daughter of Richard Mor de Burgh, Lord of Connacht and Justiciar of Ireland, and Egidia de Lacy. She had three brothers and three sisters, including Walter de Burgh, 1st Earl of Ulster.

== Marriage and issue ==
In 1242, Margery married Theobald Butler, 3rd Chief Butler of Ireland (1224–1248), the eldest son of Theobald le Botiller, Chief Butler of Ireland and his first wife, Joan, daughter of Geoffrey de Marsh (or Mareys), Knt., Justiciar of Ireland.

Margery and Theobald had two children:

- Theobald Butler, 4th Chief Butler of Ireland (1242- 26 September 1285), who married, in 1268, Joan FitzJohn (died 26 May 1303), daughter of John Fitzgeoffrey, Justiciar of Ireland, and Isabel Bigod. Joan was a younger sister of his uncle's wife, Aveline FitzJohn. The marriage produced issue, from whom descended the Earls of Ormond.
- Elizabeth Butler (Le Botiller)

== Death ==
Margery's husband died 26 December 1248. He was buried before 3 August 1248 at Arklow, County Limerick. On 27 April 1250, she made a fine to remarry.

Margery de Burgh died on 1 March 1252.

== See also ==
- House of Burgh, an Anglo-Norman and Hiberno-Norman dynasty founded in 1193
- Lord of Connaught
- Earl of Ulster
