= Margaret de Braose, Lady of Trim =

Anglo-Welsh noblewoman

Margaret de Braose
- Lady of Trim
- Died: after 1255
- Noble family: de Braose
- Spouses: Walter de Lacy, Lord of Trim Castle
- Issue: Gilbert de Lacy; Pernel de Lacy; Egidia de Lacy another three whose names are not recorded
- Father: William de Braose, 4th Lord of Bramber
- Mother: Maud de St. Valéry

Margaret de Braose, Lady of Trim (died after 1255), was an Anglo-Welsh noblewoman, the daughter of Marcher Lord William de Braose, 4th Lord of Bramber and the legendary Maud de St. Valéry, who was left to starve to death by orders of King John of England. Margaret founded a religious house, the Hospital of St. John in her mother Maud's memory. Margaret was the wife of Walter de Lacy, Lord of Trim Castle in County Meath, Ireland, and Ludlow Castle in Shropshire.

== Family ==
Margaret was a daughter of William de Braose, 4th Lord of Bramber, a powerful Marcher Lord, and Maud de St. Valéry. She was reputed to have had about fifteen siblings, although only eight have been recorded. Her paternal grandparents were William de Braose, 3rd Lord Bramber and Bertha of Hereford, and her maternal grandparents were Bernard de St. Valery and Matilda.

== Marriage and issue ==
In November 1200, Margaret married Walter de Lacy, Lord of Trim Castle in County Meath, Ireland, and Ludlow Castle in Shropshire. He also owned many estates and manors in Herefordshire including Ewyas Lacy. He was later appointed Sheriff of Hereford. It was an advantageous marriage as Walter and her father both held castles and lordships in the Welsh Marches as well as Ireland, and thus the two men looked after each other's interests in both places.

Together Walter and Margaret had at least six children who included:

- Gilbert de Lacy (1202 – 25 December 1230), married as her first husband Isabel Bigod, by whom he had issue.
- Pernel de Lacy (1201 – after 25 November 1288), married firstly William St. Omer, and secondly Ralph VI de Toeni by whom she had issue.
- Egidia de Lacy (born c. 1205), married Richard Mor de Burgh, by whom she had issue.

== Hospital of St. John ==
In 1208, Margaret's parents lost favour with their patron, King John of England, who seized all of the de Braose castles in the Welsh Marches. In order to escape from John's vindictive wrath, Margaret's mother, Maud and her eldest brother William fled to Ireland where they found refuge with Margaret and her family at Trim Castle. In 1210, however, King John sent an expedition to Ireland. Maud and William escaped from Trim but were apprehended on the Antrim coast while attempting to sail to Scotland. They were dispatched to England where they were both left to starve to death inside the dungeon of Corfe Castle, Dorset on the orders of King John. Walter de Lacy's estates were forfeited to the Crown as punishment for having harboured traitors inside his castle.

By 1215, Walter and Margaret were back in the King's favour, and Walter's confiscated estates were restored to him. As a further token of John's favour, Walter was appointed Castellan and Sheriff of Hereford the following year, and Margaret obtained permission to found a religious house in memory of her mother. On 10 October 1216, eight days before his death, King John conceded three carucates of land in the royal forest of Aconbury, Herefordshire to Margaret for the construction of the Hospital of St. John. King John sent the instructions to her husband Walter by letters patent. Margaret's subsequent attempts to free her foundation from the control of the Hospitallers led her into a lengthy dispute which ultimately involved the Pope.

Margaret died on an unknown date sometime after 1255. Her husband had died in 1241, leaving his vast holdings and lordships to their granddaughters by their son Gilbert, Margery de Lacy, and Maud de Lacy, Baroness Geneville.
