= Theobald Butler, 3rd Chief Butler of Ireland =

Theobald Butler, 3rd Chief Butler of Ireland (1224 – 26 December 1248) was 6 years old when his father, Theobald le Botiller died. His mother was Joan de Marisco, daughter of the Justiciar of Ireland, Geoffrey de Marisco. Like his infamous father-in-law, Theobald was created Justiciar of Ireland in 1247. He supported King Henry III in his wars with his barons. He was buried beside his father at Arklow.

== Marriage and Children ==
He married Margery de Burgh, in 1242, daughter of Justiciar of Ireland Richard Mór de Burgh, 1st Lord of Connacht. With his wife he had, besides other lands, the manors of Ardmaile and Killmorarkill. Their children were:

- Theobald Butler, 4th Chief Butler of Ireland
- Edmond Butler (d.1321)
- Joanna Butler (1244-1301)
- William Butler (1248-1306) he marries and has four surviving children

== See also ==
- Butler dynasty
