= Egidia de Lacy, Lady of Connacht =

Cambro-Norman noblewoman

Egidia de Lacy
- Lady of Connacht
- Born: c. 1200; Trim Castle, County Meath, Ireland
- Died: 24 February 1240; Connaught, Ireland
- Noble family: de Lacy
- Spouse: Richard Mor de Burgh
- Issue: Richard de Burgh, Lord of Connacht, Justiciar of Ireland; Walter de Burgh, 1st Earl of Ulster; William de Burgh; Margery de Burgh; Mathilda, wife of Gerald de Prendergast; Unnamed daughter, wife of Hamon de Valoignes; Alice de Burgh
- Father: Walter de Lacy, Lord of Trim Castle and Ludlow Castle
- Mother: Margaret de Braose

Egidia de Lacy, Lady of Connacht (c. 1200 – 24 February 1240), was a Cambro-Norman noblewoman, the wife of Richard Mór de Burgh, 1st Baron of Connaught and Strathearn (c.1180–1242), and the mother of his seven children, including Sir William Óg de Burgh, a lord and warrior and Walter de Burgh, the first Earl of Ulster. She was also known as Gille de Lacy. Egidia was the daughter of Walter II de Lacy by his second wife Margaret de Braose.

== Family ==
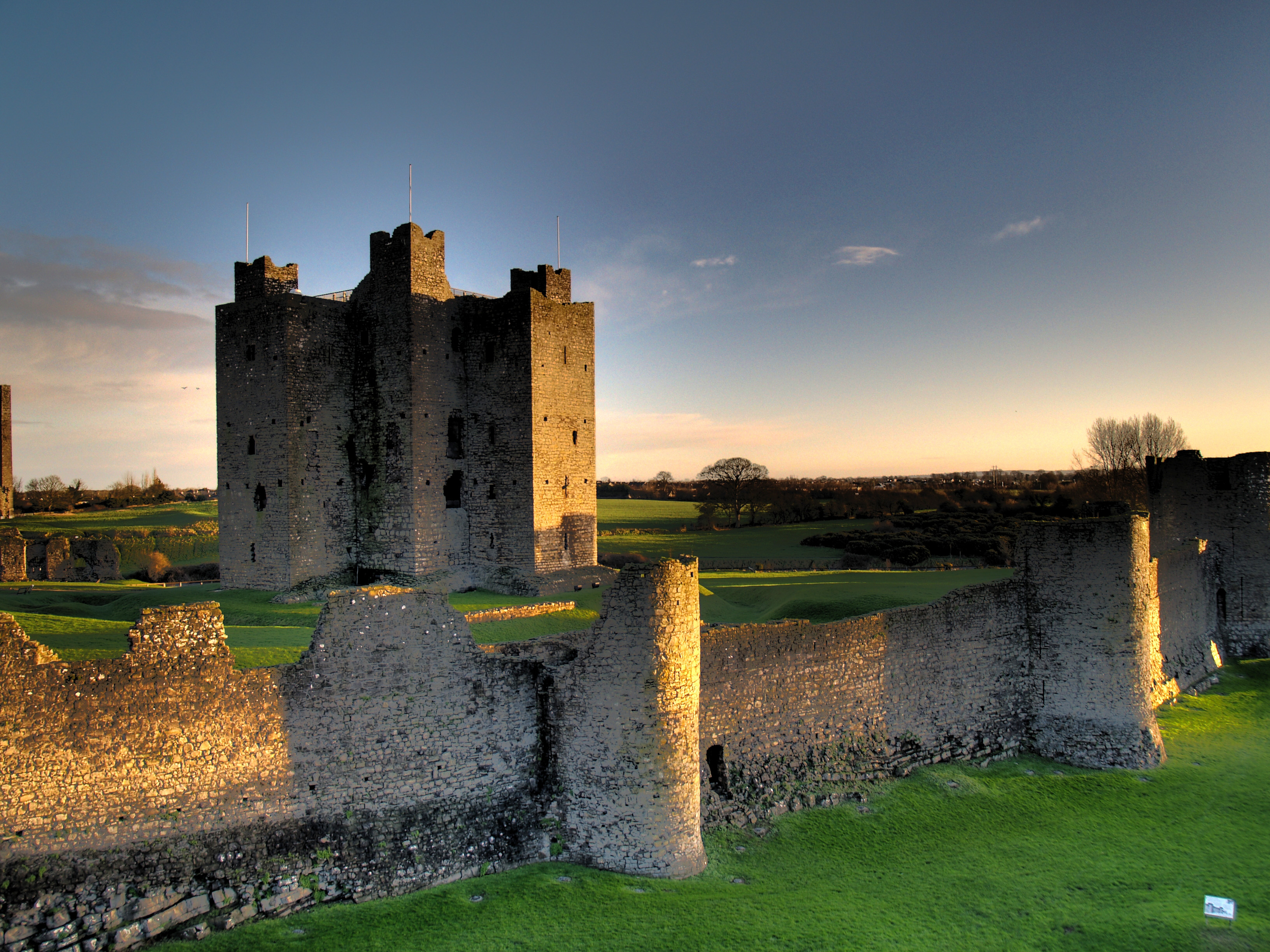
Trim Castle, birthplace of Egidia de Lacy

Egidia de Lacy was born at Trim Castle, (County Meath, Ireland) about 1205 the daughter of Walter de Lacy, Lord of Meath and Margaret de Braose. Egidia, also known as Gille, was one of at least six children. Her brother Gilbert de Lacy (c. 1202 – d. 1230) married Isabel Bigod, by whom he had issue. Her sister Pernel de Lacy (c.1201 – after 25 November 1288), married firstly, William Saint Omer, and secondly, Ralph VI de Toeni, by whom she had issue.

Egidia'a paternal grandparents were Hugh de Lacy, Lord of Meath, and Rohese of Monmouth, and her maternal grandparents were William de Braose, 4th Lord of Bramber, and Maud de St. Valery.

== Marriage and children ==
On 21 April 1225 she married Richard Mor de Burgh (1194 –17 February 1243), Lord of Connacht (May 1227- 1242/1243), Justiciar of Ireland (1228–1232), the son of William de Burgh and More O' Brien, daughter of Donal Mor mac Turlough O' Brien, King of Thomond and Orlachan MacMurrough of Leinster. The marriage produced seven children:

- Richard de Burgh, Lord of Connacht (died 1248)
- Walter de Burgh, 1st Earl of Ulster (1230 – 28 July 1271), married Aveline FitzJohn, daughter of John FitzGeoffrey, Justiciar of Ireland and Isabel Bigod, by whom he had issue, including Richard Óg de Burgh, 2nd Earl of Ulster.
- William de Burgh (died 1270), married and had a son, William Liath.
- Margery de Burgh (died after 1 March 1253), married Theobald le Botiller, son of Theobald le Botiller, chief Butler of Ireland and Joan du Marais, by whom she had issue. They were ancestors of the Butler Earls of Ormond.
- Mathilda, daughter who married Gerald de Prendergast, by whom she had issue, including a daughter Maud de Prendergast who in her turn married as her first husband Maurice FitzGerald, 3rd Lord of Offaly. Maurice FitzGerald and Maud de Prendergast were the parents of a daughter, Juliana FitzGerald.
- Unnamed daughter who married Hamon de Valoignes, by whom she had issue.
- Alice de Burgh

== Death ==
Egidia died on 24 February 1240 Connaught Ireland.

== Ancestry ==
Ancestors of Egidia de Lacy, Lady of Connacht

16. Roger de Lacy
8. Gilbert de Lacy
4. Hugh de Lacy, Lord of Meath
9. Agnes
2. Walter de Lacy
20. William FitzBaderon
10. Baderon de Monmouth
5. Rohese (Rose) de Monmouth
22. Sir Gilbert FitzRichard, Lord of Clare
11. Rohese de Clare
23. Adeliza/Alice de Clermont
1. Egidia de Lacy
24. Philip de Braose
12. William de Braose, 3rd Lord of Bramber
25. Aenor Fitz Judhel of Totnes
6. William de Braose, 4th Lord of Bramber
26. Miles de Gloucester, 1st Earl of Hereford
13. Bertha of Hereford
27. Sibyl of Neufmarche
3. Margaret de Braose, Lady of Trim
28. Reginald de St. Valéry
14. Bernard de St. Valéry
7. Maud de St. Valéry
15. Matilda
