= Ballybritt =

Ballybritt Baile an Bhriotaigh (Irish)
- Barony
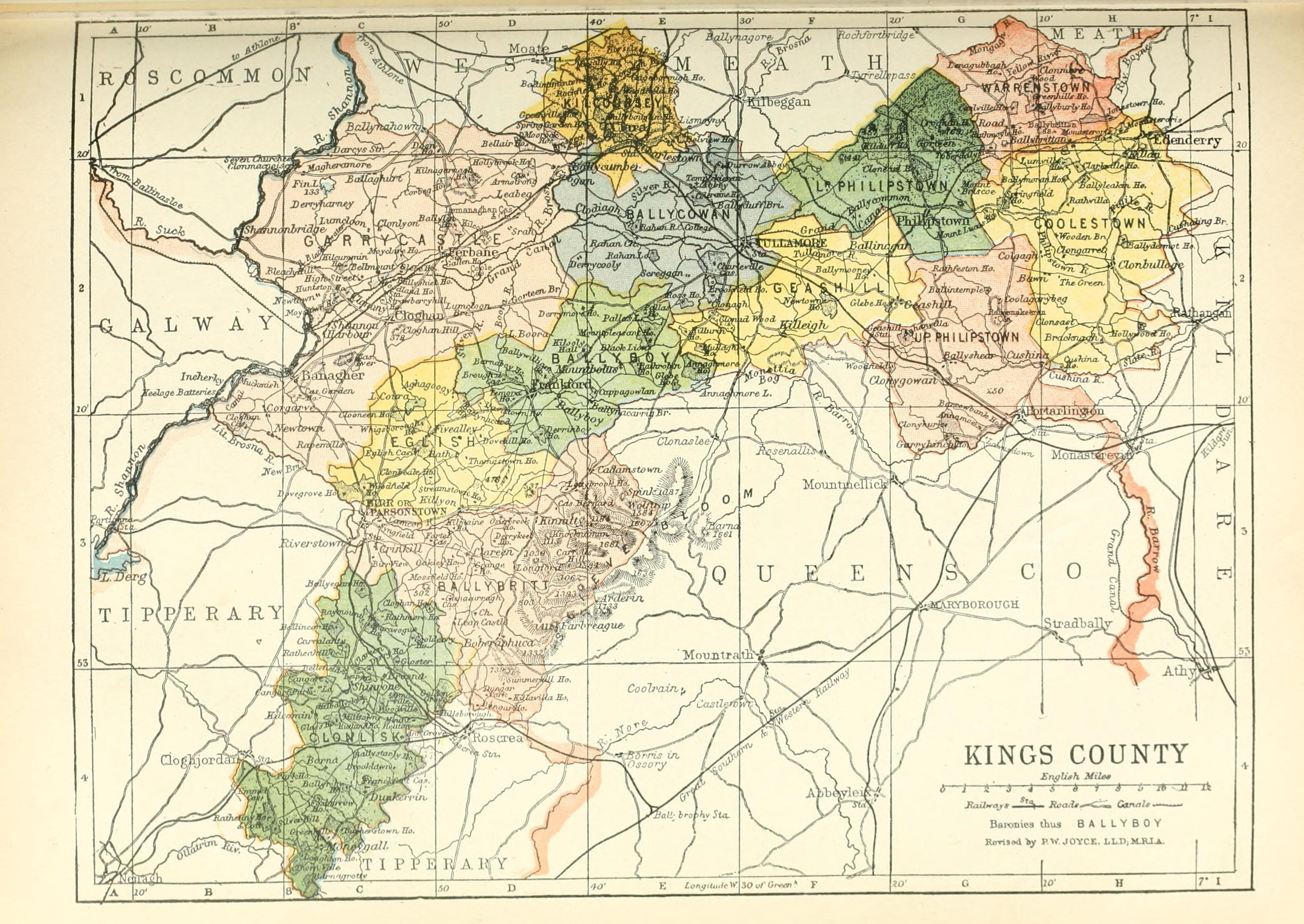
- Baronies of County Offaly. Ballybritt is shaded pink.

- Location in Ireland
- Coordinates: 53°03′19″N 7°45′28″W
- Sovereign state: Ireland
- County: Offaly

Area
  - Total: 211.97 km^{2} (81.84 sq mi)

Ballybritt (Irish: Baile an Bhriotaigh) is a barony in County Offaly (formerly King's County), Ireland.

== Etymology ==
Ballybritt derives its name from Ballybritt Castle (near Roscrea) and the townland of Ballybritt (Irish Baile an Bhriotaigh, "settlement of the Welshman").

== Location ==
Ballybritt is located in south County Offaly, west of the Slieve Bloom Mountains.

== History ==
Ballybritt was included in the northern part of the territory of the Éile (Ely), and in early times was a crossroads for the ancient borders of the kingdoms of Mumu, Mide and Laigin.

== List of settlements ==
Below is a list of settlements in Ballybritt:

- Birr
- Cadamstown
- Clareen
- Crinkill
- Kinnitty
