= Clonlisk =

Clonlisk Cluain Leisc (Irish)
- Barony
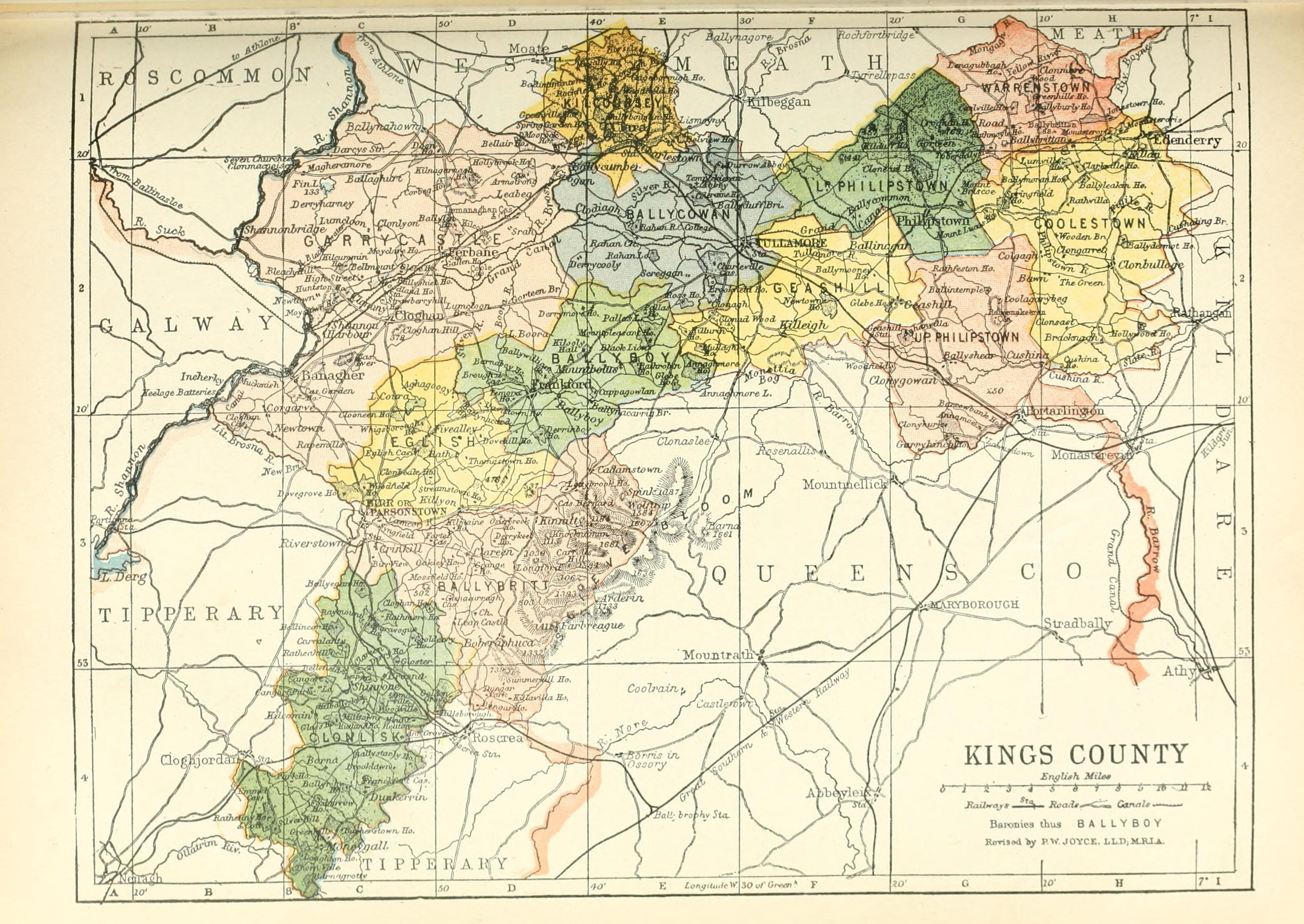
- Baronies of County Offaly. Clonlisk is shaded green.
- Interactive map of Clonlisk
- Location within Ireland
- Coordinates: 52°57′25″N 7°55′18″W
- Sovereign state: Ireland
- County: Offaly

Area
  - Total: 198.51 km^{2} (76.65 sq mi)

Clonlisk (Irish: Cluain Leisc) is a barony in County Offaly (formerly King's County), Ireland.

== Etymology ==
Clonlisk derives its name from Clonlisk Castle (near Dunkerrin) and the townland of Clonlisk (Irish Cluain Leisc, 'meadow of laziness').

== Location ==
Clonlisk is located in southwest County Offaly.

== History ==
Clonlisk was part of the territory of the Ó Cearbhaill (O'Carroll) of Éile (Ely).

== List of settlements ==
Below is a list of settlements in Clonlisk:

- Brosna
- Moneygall
- Shinrone
