= Richard Mór de Burgh, 1st Baron of Connaught =

Anglo-Norman chieftain and noble (c.1180–1242/3)

Richard Mór de Burgh 1st Lord of Connaught
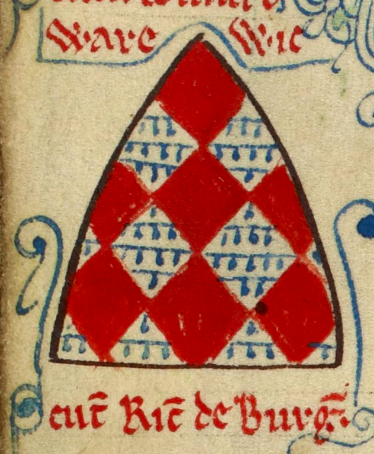
- The inverted shield of Richard de Burgh from 'Historia Anglorum' (c.1250–59): British Library, Royal MS.14 CVII Historia Anglorum.

Justiciar of Ireland
- In office 13 February 1228 – 16 June 1232
- Preceded by: Geoffrey de Marisco
- Succeeded by: Hubert de Burgh, 1st Earl of Kent

Personal details
- Born: c. 1194
- Died: c. 1242
- Spouse: Egidia de Lacy, Lady of Connacht
- Children: Sir Richard de Burgh; Walter de Burgh, 1st Earl of Ulster; William Óg de Burgh; Alice de Burgh; Margery de Burgh; Matilda de Burgh; Daughter de Burgh
- Parents: William de Burgh (father); Daughter of King Domnall Mór Ua Briain (mother)

Richard Mór de Burgh, 1st Lord of Connacht (English: /dəˈbɜːr/ də-BUR; c. 1194 – 1242 or 1243), was an Anglo-Norman aristocrat who was seneschal of Munster and Justiciar of Ireland (1228–32).

== Background ==
Richard Mór de Burgh was born towards the end of the year in 1193 (and came of age in 1214). He was the eldest son and heir of William de Burgh and his wife (daughter of Domnall Mór Ua Briain, King of Thomond). Richard's principal estate was in the barony of Loughrea where he built a castle in 1236 and a town was founded. He also founded Galway town and Ballinasloe. The islands on Lough Mask and Lough Orben were also part of his demesne.

From the death of his father (1206) until he reached his majority and received his inheritance (1214), Richard was a ward of the crown of England. In 1215 he briefly served in the household of his uncle, Hubert de Burgh, Earl of Kent. In 1223 (and again in 1225) he was appointed Seneschal of Munster and keeper of Limerick Castle.

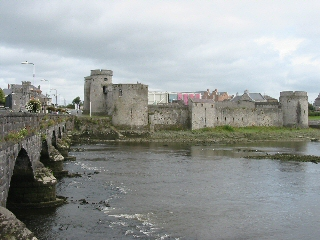
Limerick Castle

== Connacht ==
In 1224, Richard claimed Connacht (which had been granted to his father but never, in fact, conquered by him): he asserted that the grant to the Gaelic king Cathal Crobdearg Ua Conchobair (after William de Burgh's death in 1206), had been on condition of faithful service and that the king's son, Aedh mac Cathal Crobdearg Ua Conchobair (who succeeded that year) had forfeited it. Richard had the favour of his uncle, Hubert, justiciar of England, and was later awarded Connacht (May 1227). Having been given custody of the counties of Cork and Waterford and all the crown lands of Decies and Desmond, he was appointed Justiciar of Ireland (1228–32). In 1230 he was able to send the King 2000 marks, the proceeds of a tax of one-sixteenth on ecclesiastical benefices. He was removed from office in 1232, but his disgrace was short-lived.

When, in 1232, his uncle Hubert fell from grace, Richard was able to distance himself and avoid being campaigned against by Henry III. It was only in 1235, when he summoned the whole feudal host of the English lords and magnates to aid him, that he finally expelled the Gaelic king, Felim mac Cathal Crobderg Ua Conchobair, from Connacht. Richard and his lieutenants received great shares of land, while Felim was obliged to pay homage and was allowed to hold only five cantreds (in Roscommon), while Richard held the remaining 25 cantreds of Connacht in chief of the crown of England. De Burgh took the title of "Lord of Connacht".

== Wife and children ==
Before 21 April 1225, he married Egidia de Lacy (daughter of Walter de Lacy and his wife Margaret de Braose), with which alliance he acquired the cantred of Eóghanacht Caisil with the castle of Ardmayle in Tipperary. Richard and Egidia had three sons and four daughters:

- Sir Richard de Burgh (d.1248), Lord of Connaught, Constable of Montgomery Castle married a relative of Eleanor of Provence, and died (without issue) in Poitou.
- Walter de Burgh, 1st Earl of Ulster (d.1271), Lord of Connaught.
- William Óg de Burgh (d.1270), Anglo-Irish Lord and warrior who was the ancestor of the Lords of Clanricarde.
- Alice de Burgh.
- Margery de Burgh (died after March 1253) married Theobald Butler, 3rd Chief Butler of Ireland.
- Matilda de Burgh married Sir Gerald de Prendergast of Beauvoir; they had a daughter, Maud.
- Daughter de Burgh who married Hamon de Valoynes; they had a daughter, Mabel de Valoynes.

Richard de Burgh fell ill on a voyage to France and died shortly before 17 February 1243.

== Ancestry ==
Ancestors of Richard Mór de Burgh, 1st Baron of Connaught

4. Walter de Burgh?
2. William de Burgh
5. Alice?
1. Richard Mór de Burgh, 1st Baron of Connaught
12. Toirdhealbhach mac Diarmada Ua Briain, King of Munster
6. Domnall Mór Ua Briain
13. Sadb MacGillapatrick
3. Princess (Ní Briain) of Thomond
14. Diarmait Mac Murchada, King of Leinster
7. Orlacan
15. Sadb Ní Faeláin

== See also ==
- House of Burgh, an Anglo-Norman and Hiberno-Norman dynasty founded in 1193
- Lord of Connaught
- Earl of Ulster

Legal offices
Preceded by Geoffrey de Morisco	Justiciar of Ireland; 1228–1232	Succeeded by Hubert de Burgh, 1st Earl of Kent
