= Chief governor of Ireland =

English or British official, 1170s–1922

The chief governor was the senior official in the Dublin Castle administration, which maintained English and British rule in Ireland from the 1170s to 1922. The chief governor was the viceroy of the English monarch (and later the British monarch) and presided over the Privy Council of Ireland. In some periods he was in effective charge of the administration, subject only to the monarch; in others he was a figurehead and power was wielded by others.

== Nomenclature ==
"Chief governor" is an umbrella term favoured by eighteenth-century historians Walter Harris and John Lodge and subsequently used by many historians and statutes. It was occasionally used before then. (Note: As for example in a 1592 council minute by Robert Cecil, or a 1662 act of the Parliament of Ireland.) Chief governors were appointed under various titles, the most common of which were:

- (Chief) justiciar (13th–14th centuries), Latin: capitalis justiciarius
- (King's) lieutenant (14th–16th century)
- Lord Deputy (15th–17th centuries)
- Lord Lieutenant (1660–1922) more formally Lieutenant General and General Governor or Lieutenant-General and Governor-General and colloquially called the Viceroy. The Lord Lieutenant's consort was the Vicereine, an important figure in the Irish social season.

Less common titles include procurator and gubernator, and the temporary title custos or keeper.

Sometimes individuals with different titles served simultaneously, in which case the order of precedence was: lieutenant > justiciar > custos > deputy (lieutenant) > deputy justiciar. The title "Deputy", and later "Lord Deputy", was originally applied to the resident deputy of a non-resident king's lieutenant, when the latter title was an honour bestowed on a favoured English noble. Latterly, such resident deputies were called Lord Justices.

The Interpretation Act 1889 provided that 'The expression "Lord Lieutenant" includes Lords Justices or other Chief Governor or Governors of Ireland for the time being.' Subsequent Statute Law Revision Acts trimmed formulas such as "the Lord Lieutenant or other Chief Governor or Governors of Ireland" from older acts of parliament, standardising to "the Lord Lieutenant".

== History ==
In Norman Ireland as in England, a chief justiciar combined executive and judicial functions. The judicial office of Lord Chief Justice of Ireland later separated from that of the chief governor. In the fifteenth century, chief governors, especially the Earls of Kildare, began taking initiatives in the Parliament of Ireland contrary to the wishes of the English court. This prompted the passing of Poynings' Law in 1495 to make Irish laws subject to amendment and veto by the Privy Council of England. From 1569 to 1672, much of the land was under martial law and the Lord Deputy had regional deputies in the Lord President of Munster and Lord President of Connaught. From the Williamite Wars till the Constitution of 1782, the Lord Lieutenant was a British noble who came to Ireland only every two years, when Parliament was in session; his main role was to steer legislation through Parliament. Three ex-officio Lords Justices deputised in the Lord Lieutenant's absences. In 1757 the Earl of Kildare (later 1st Duke of Leinster) was one of the Lords Justices and hoped to be made sole Lord Deputy, but was rebuffed.

After the Acts of Union 1800, the Parliament was abolished and political administration was done by the Chief Secretary for Ireland. The role of Lord Lieutenant (or Viceroy) was ceremonial and there were calls for it to be abolished. He resided in the Viceregal Lodge throughout his term, but no Irishman was appointed till Viscount FitzAlan in the office's final year. During the Irish War of Independence, Lord French attempted to maintain a more activist role, but was rebuffed. The Government of Ireland Act 1920 created Northern Ireland and Southern Ireland but retained a single Lord Lieutenant for both. When the Irish Free State replaced Southern Ireland in December 1922, the Lord Lieutenant was replaced and separated into the Governor-General of the Irish Free State (abolished in 1936) and the Governor of Northern Ireland (abolished in 1973).
