= 1212 in Ireland =

- Centuries: 11th; 12th; 13th; 14th; 15th
- Decades: 1190s; 1200s; 1210s; 1220s; 1230s
- See also: Other events of 1212; List of years in Ireland

Events from the year 1212 in Ireland.

== Incumbent ==
- Lord: John

== Events ==
- Aedh Ua Neill, king of Cenel-Conaill and of Cenel-Eogain attacked a great deal of foreigners, wherein were killed a countless number of them.
- Monastic reform orders like the Cistercians continued to expand in Ireland.

== Deaths ==
- Donal O'Kennedy, bishop of Killaloe
