= 1214 in Ireland =

- Centuries: 11th; 12th; 13th; 14th; 15th
- Decades: 1190s; 1200s; 1210s; 1220s; 1230s
- See also: Other events of 1214; List of years in Ireland

Events from the year 1214 in Ireland.

== Incumbents ==
- Lord: John
- Justiciar of Ireland: Henry de London, Archbishop of Dublin
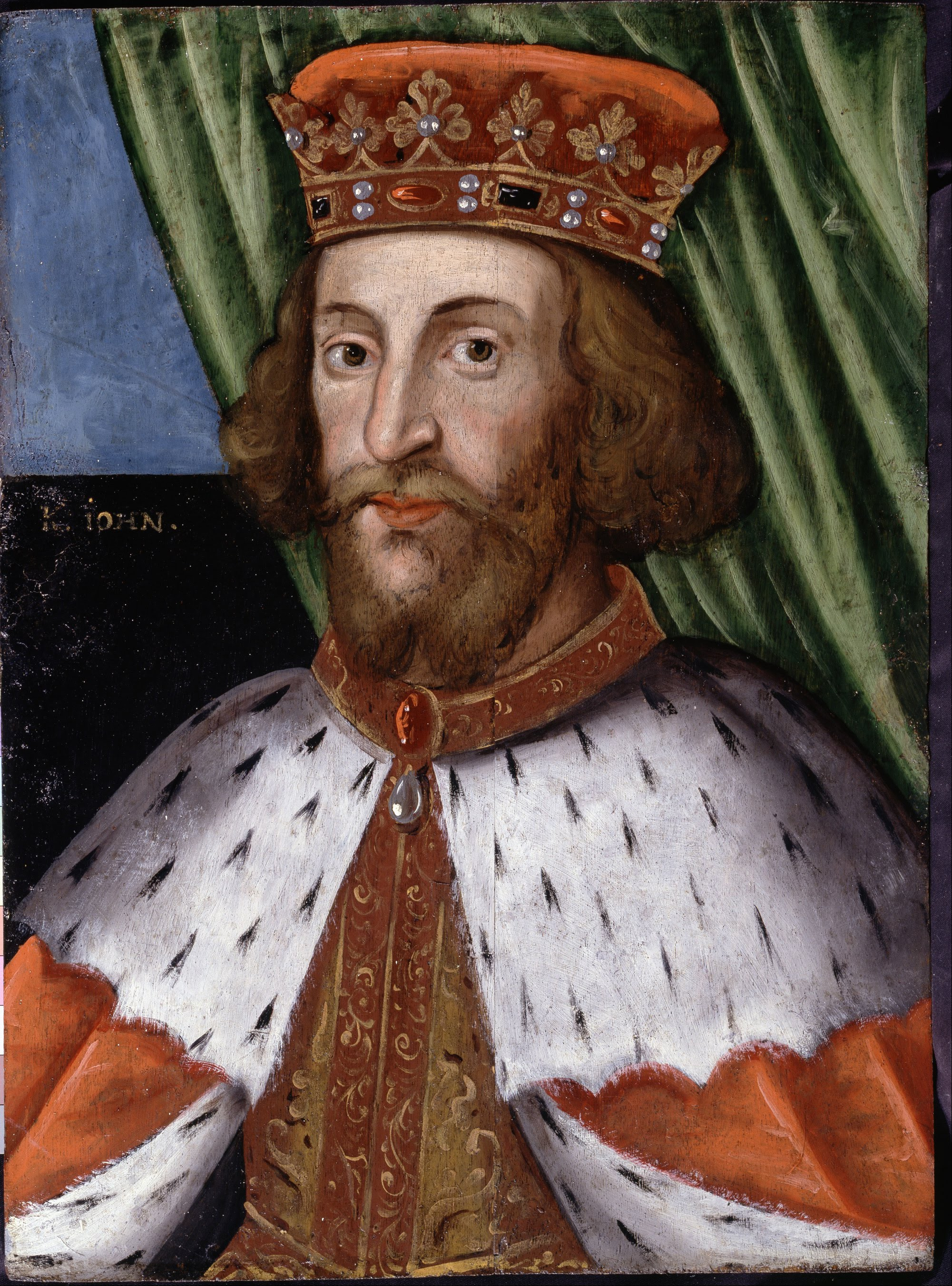
- Lord of Ireland, John.
  King of Connacht: Cathal Crobhdearg Ua Conchobair
- King of Tír Eoghain: Aodh Méith

== Events ==
- Thomas MacUchtraigh plundered Derry for the second time, carrying away the treasures of the monastery and the church of St Columba.
- During fighting between the Ua Catháin and the sons of Mac Lochlainn, the great manciple of the monastery at Derry was killed.
- Thomas MacUchtraigh and the Anglo-Normans of the Earldom of Ulster constructed a castle at Coleraine, dismantling much of the existing settlement for building material while leaving the church intact.
- Aodh Méith, King of Tír Eoghain, defeated an Anglo-Norman force in eastern Ulster and burned its encampment at Carrlongport.

== Deaths ==
- Ainmire Ua Cobhthaigh, abbot of Derry.
- Gilla-na-naemh Ua Ruadháin, Bishop of Achonry.
- Ó Ceallaigh, Bishop of Uí Fhiachrach.
- Brian Ó Flaithbheartaigh of West Connacht.
