= 1218 in Ireland =

- Centuries: 11th; 12th; 13th; 14th; 15th
- Decades: 1190s; 1200s; 1210s; 1220s; 1230s
- See also: Other events of 1218; List of years in Ireland

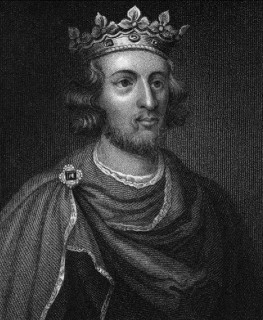
Lord of Ireland, Henry III

Events from the year 1218 in Ireland.

== Incumbents ==
- Lord: Henry III
- Justiciar of Ireland: Geoffrey de Marisco
- King of Connacht: Cathal Crobhdearg Ua Conchobair
- King of Tír Eoghain: Aodh Méith

== Events ==
- Diarmaid mac Conchobair Mac Diarmata, king of Moylurg, died and was succeeded by Cormac Mac Diarmata.
- Muirchertach Ó Floinn, king of Uí Tuirtre, was killed by the Anglo-Normans.
- Conghalach Ó Cuinn, lord of Magh Lughad and Síl Cathusaigh, was killed.
- Athlone was burned on the Meath side of the town.
- The church of Boyle Abbey was consecrated.
- Reginald Talbot was fined for attempting to illegally export a goshawk from Ireland through Dalkey.

== Deaths ==
- Gilla Tighearnach Mac Gilla Rónáin, bishop of Clogher and chief canonist of Ireland
- Ingantach Mac Congalaigh
- Diarmaid mac Conchobair Mac Diarmata
- Mór Ní Briain, queen of Connacht
- Muirchertach Ó Floinn
- Conghalach Ó Cuinn
