= Parliament of Ireland =

Former parliament of Ireland

Parliament of Ireland Parlaimint na hÉireann
- Arms of Ireland

Type
- Type: Bicameral (Note: Tricameral until 1537.)
- Houses: House of Lords; House of Commons

History
- Established: 1297
- Disbanded: 31 December 1800
- Preceded by: Gaelic Ireland
- Succeeded by: UK Parliament

Leadership
- Speaker of the House of Lords: The Earl of Clare (last)
- Speaker of the House of Commons: John Foster (last)

Elections
- House of Lords voting system: Ennoblement by the monarch; Inheritance of an Irish peerage; Receiving a writ of acceleration (as heir apparent to a father who held two or more Irish peerages); Appointment to an Irish see
- House of Commons voting system: Plurality block voting with limited suffrage

Meeting place
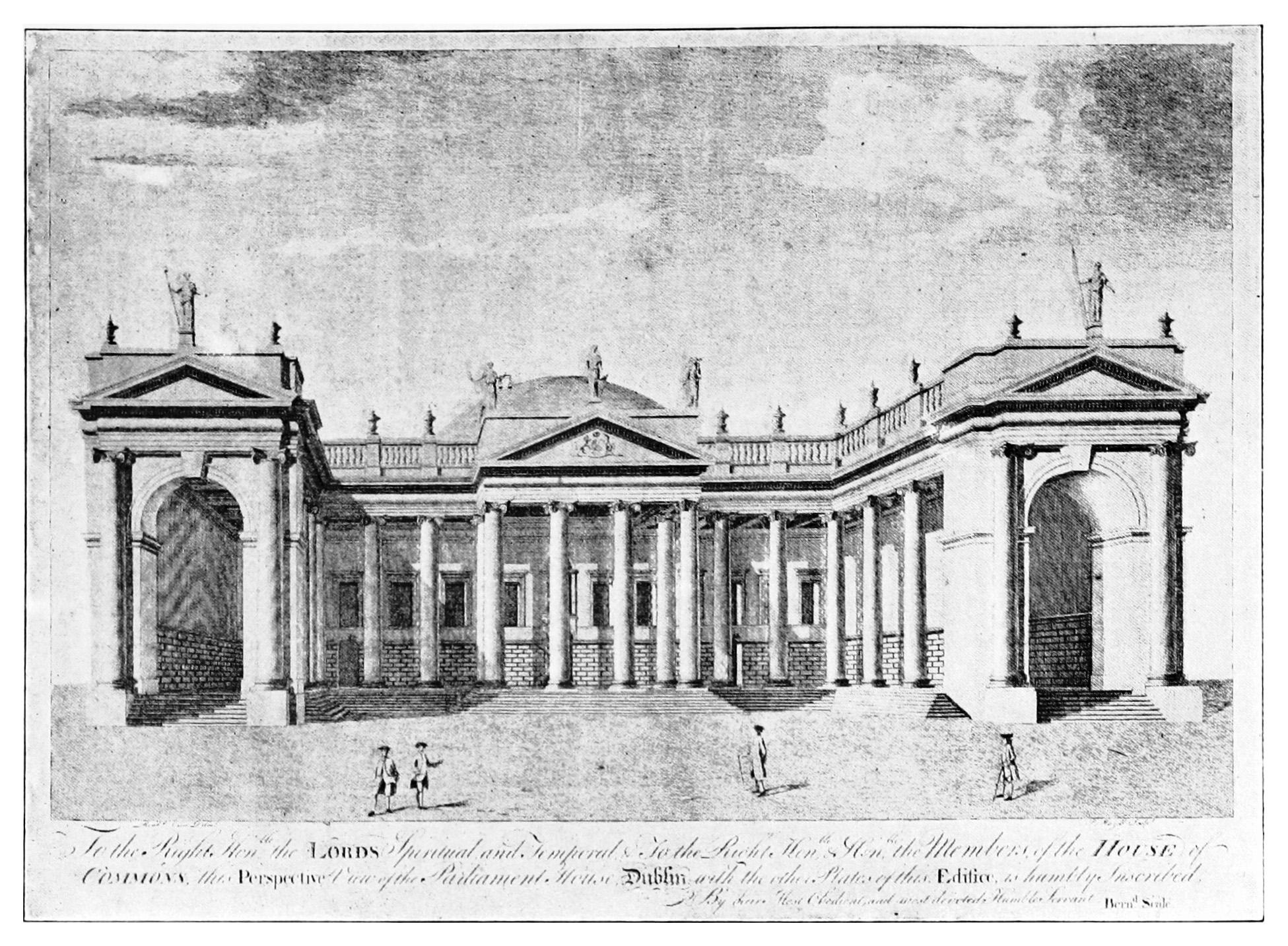
- Parliament House, Dublin (1739–1800)

Footnotes
- ---- See also: Parliament of Great Britain

The Parliament of Ireland (Irish: Parlaimint na hÉireann) was the legislature of the Lordship of Ireland, and later the Kingdom of Ireland, from 1297 until the end of 1800. It was modelled on the Parliament of England and from 1537 comprised two chambers: the House of Commons and the House of Lords. The Lords were members of the Irish peerage ('lords temporal') and bishops ('lords spiritual'; after the Reformation, Church of Ireland bishops). The Commons was directly elected, albeit on a very restricted franchise. Parliaments met at various places in Leinster and Munster, but latterly always in Dublin: in Christ Church Cathedral (15th century), Dublin Castle (to 1649), Chichester House (1661–1727), the Blue Coat School (1729–31), and finally a purpose-built Parliament House on College Green.

The main purpose of parliament was to approve taxes that were then levied by and for the Dublin Castle administration. Those who would pay the bulk of taxation, namely the clergy, merchants, and landowners, also comprised the members. Only the "English of Ireland" were represented until the first Gaelic lords were summoned during the 16th-century Tudor reconquest. Under Poynings' Law of 1495, all Acts of Parliament had to be pre-approved by the Irish Privy Council and English Privy Council. Parliament supported the Irish Reformation and Catholics were excluded from membership and voting in penal times. The Constitution of 1782 amended Poynings' Law to allow the Irish Parliament to initiate legislation. Catholics were re-enfranchised under the Roman Catholic Relief Act 1793.

The Acts of Union 1800 merged the Kingdom of Ireland and Kingdom of Great Britain into the United Kingdom of Great Britain and Ireland. The parliament was merged with that of Great Britain; the united Parliament was in effect the British parliament at Westminster enlarged with a subset of the Irish Lords and Commons.

== History ==
=== Middle Ages ===
After the 12th-century Anglo-Norman invasion of Ireland, administration of the Anglo-Norman Lordship of Ireland was modelled on that of the Kingdom of England. Magna Carta was extended in 1217 in the Charter of Ireland. As in England, parliament evolved out of the Magnum Concilium "great council" summoned by the king's viceroy, attended by the council (curia regis), magnates (feudal lords), and prelates (bishops and abbots). Membership was based on fealty to the king, and the preservation of the king's peace, and so the fluctuating number of autonomous Irish Gaelic kings were outside of the system; they had their own local brehon law taxation arrangements. The earliest known parliament met at Kilkea Castle near Castledermot, County Kildare on 18 June 1264, with only prelates and magnates attending. Elected representatives are first attested in 1297 and continually from the later 14th century. In 1297, counties were first represented by elected knights of the shire (sheriffs had previously represented them). In 1299, towns were represented. From the 14th century a distinction from the English parliament was that deliberations on church funding were held in Parliament rather than in Convocation. The separation of the individually summoned lords from the elected commons had developed by the 15th century. The clerical proctors elected by the lower clergy of each diocese formed a separate house or estate in until 1537, when they were expelled for their opposition to the Irish Reformation.

The 14th and 15th centuries saw shrinking numbers of those loyal to the crown, the growing power of landed families, and the increasing inability to carry out judicial rulings, that all reduced the crown's presence in Ireland. Alongside this reduced control grew a "Gaelic resurgence" that was political as well as cultural. In turn this resulted in considerable numbers of the Hiberno-Norman Old English nobility joining the independent Gaelic nobles in asserting their feudal independence. Eventually the crown's power shrank to a small fortified enclave around Dublin known as the Pale. The Parliament thereafter became essentially the forum for the Pale community until the 16th century.

Unable to implement and exercise the authority of the Parliament or the Crown's rule outside of this environ, and increasingly under the attack of raids by the Gaelic Irish and independent Hiberno-Norman nobles, the Palesmen themselves encouraged the Kings of England to take a more direct role in the affairs of Ireland. Geographic distance, the lack of attention by the Crown because of the Hundred Years' War and the Wars of the Roses, and the larger power of the Gaelic clans, all reduced the effectiveness of the Irish Parliament. Thus, increasingly worried that the Irish Parliament was essentially being overawed by powerful landed families in Ireland like the Earl of Kildare into passing laws that pursued the agendas of the different dynastic factions in the country, in 1494, the Parliament encouraged the passing of Poynings' Law which subordinated Irish Parliament to the English one.

=== Kingdom of Ireland ===
The role of the Parliament changed after 1541, when Henry VIII declared the Kingdom of Ireland and embarked on the Tudor conquest of Ireland. Despite an era which featured royal concentration of power and decreasing feudal power throughout the rest of Europe, King Henry VIII over-ruled earlier court rulings putting families and lands under attainder and recognised the privileges of the Gaelic nobles, thereby expanding the crown's de jure authority. In return for recognising the crown's authority under the new Kingdom of Ireland, the Gaelic-Anglo-Irish lords had their position legalised and were entitled to attend the Irish Parliament as equals under the policy of surrender and regrant.

The Reformation in Ireland introduced in stages by the Tudor monarchs did not take hold in most of the country, and did not affect the operation of parliament until after the papal bull Regnans in Excelsis of 1570. Initially in 1537, the Irish Parliament approved both the Act of Supremacy, acknowledging Henry VIII as head of the Church and the dissolution of the monasteries. In the parliaments of 1569 and 1585, the Old English Catholic representatives in the Irish Commons had several disputes with the crown's authorities over the introduction of penal legislation against Catholics and over-paying of "Cess" tax for the putting down of various Gaelic and Catholic rebellions.

For this reason, and the political fallout after the 1605 Gunpowder Plot and the Plantation of Ulster in 1613–1615, the constituencies for the Irish House of Commons were changed to give Protestants a majority. The Plantation of Ulster allowed English and Scottish Protestant candidates in as representatives of the newly formed boroughs in planted areas. Initially this gave Protestants a majority of 132–100 in the House of Commons. However, after vehement Catholic protests, including a brawl in the chamber on Parliament's first sitting, some of the new Parliamentary constituencies were eliminated, giving Protestants a slight majority (108-102) of members of the House of Commons thereafter.

In the House of Lords the Catholic majority continued until the 1689 "Patriot Parliament", with the exception of the Commonwealth period (1649–1660). Following the general uprising of the Catholic Irish in the Irish Rebellion of 1641 and the self-established Catholic assembly in 1642–1649, Roman Catholics were barred from voting or attending the Parliament altogether in the Cromwellian Act of Settlement 1652. Under the Cromwellian regime, the Parliament of Ireland was suspended and Ireland instead sent a small number of representatives to the parliaments of The Protectorate in Westminster. In early 1660, a Protestant representative assembly, the Irish Convention, gathered to request the re-establishment of an Irish Parliament.

=== 1660 to 1800 ===
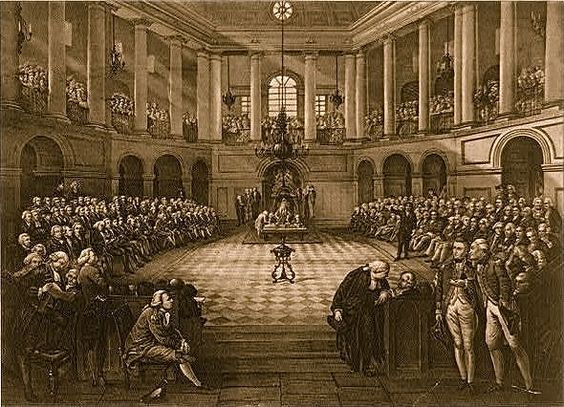
The House of Commons in session (by Henry Barraud, John Hayter)

Following the death of Cromwell and the end of the Protectorate, the Stuarts returned to the throne thereby ending the sectarian divisions relating to parliament. Charles II summoned a new Irish parliament in May 1661. Then, during the reign of James II of England, who had converted to Roman Catholicism, Irish Catholics briefly recovered their pre-eminent position as the crown now favoured their community. When James was overthrown in England, he turned to his Catholic supporters in the Irish Parliament for support. In return for its support during the Williamite war in Ireland (1688–91), a Catholic majority Patriot Parliament of 1689 persuaded James to pass legislation granting it autonomy to and to restore lands confiscated from Catholics in the Cromwellian conquest of Ireland. The Jacobite defeat in this war meant that under William III of England Protestants were returned to a favoured position in Irish society while substantial numbers of Catholic nobles and leaders could no longer sit in Parliament unless they took a loyalty oath as agreed under the Treaty of Limerick. The acts passed by the 1689 parliament were annulled by the Settlement of Ireland Act 1695. Having proven their support for Catholic absolutism by their loyal support for James during the war, and because the Papacy supported the Jacobites after 1693, Irish Catholics increasingly faced discriminatory legislation in the Penal Laws that were passed by the predominantly loyalist and Protestant Parliament from 1695.

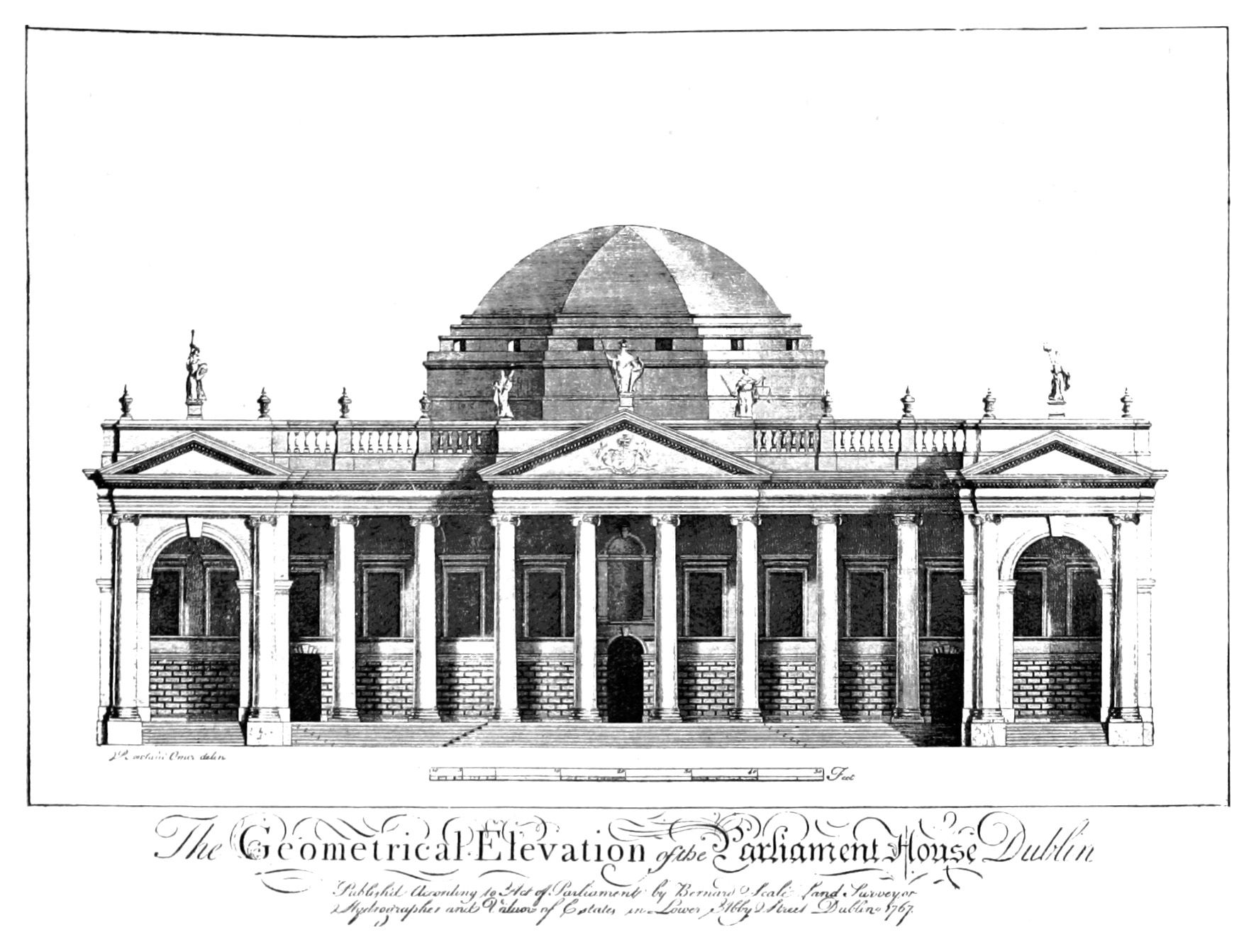
Façade of the Parliament of Ireland building

Nonetheless, the franchise was still available to wealthier Catholics. Until 1728, Catholics voted in House of Commons elections and held seats in the Lords. For no particular reason, beyond a general pressure for Catholics to conform, they were barred from voting in the election for the first parliament in the reign of George II. Privileges were also mostly limited to supporters of the Church of Ireland. Protestants who did not recognise the state-supported Church were also discriminated against in law, so non-conformists such as Presbyterians, Congregationalists and Quakers also had a subservient status in Parliament; after 1707 they could hold seats, but not public offices. Thus, the new system favoured a new Anglican establishment in Church and State.

By 1728, the remaining nobility was either firmly Protestant or loyally Catholic. The upper classes had dropped most of its Gaelic traditions and adopted the Anglo-French aristocratic values then dominant throughout most of Europe. Much of the old feudal domains of the earlier Hiberno-Norman and Gaelic-Irish magnates had been broken up and given to Irish loyalists soldiers, and English and Scottish Protestant colonial settlers. Long under the control of de jure power of magnates, the far larger peasant population had nonetheless under the relatively anarchic and sectarian conditions established a relative independence. Now, the nobility and newly established loyalist gentry could exercise their rights and privileges with more vigour. Much as in England, Wales, and Scotland, the franchise was always limited to the property owning classes, which favoured the landed gentry.

The Irish Parliament was thus at a time of English commercial expansion left incapable of protecting Irish economic and trade interests from being subordinated to English ones. This in turn severely weakened the economic potential of the whole of Ireland and placed the new and largely Protestant middle-class at a disadvantage. The result was a slow but continual exodus of Anglo-Irish, Scots-Irish, and Protestant Irish families and communities to the colonies, principally in North America. Ironically, it was the very efforts to establish Anglicans as the primacy in Ireland which slowly subverted the general cause of the Protestant Irish which had been the objective of successive Irish and British Parliaments.

The Irish Parliament did assert its independence from London several times however. In the early 18th century it successfully lobbied for itself to be summoned every two years, as opposed to at the start of each new reign only, and shortly thereafter it declared itself to be in session permanently, mirroring developments in the English Parliament. As the effects on the prosperity of the Kingdom of submitting the Irish Parliament to review by the British became apparent, the Irish Parliament slowly asserted itself, and from the 1770s the Irish Patriot Party began agitating for greater powers relative to the British Parliament. Additionally, later ministries moved to change the Navigation Acts that had limited Irish merchants' terms of trade with Britain and its empire.

== Powers ==
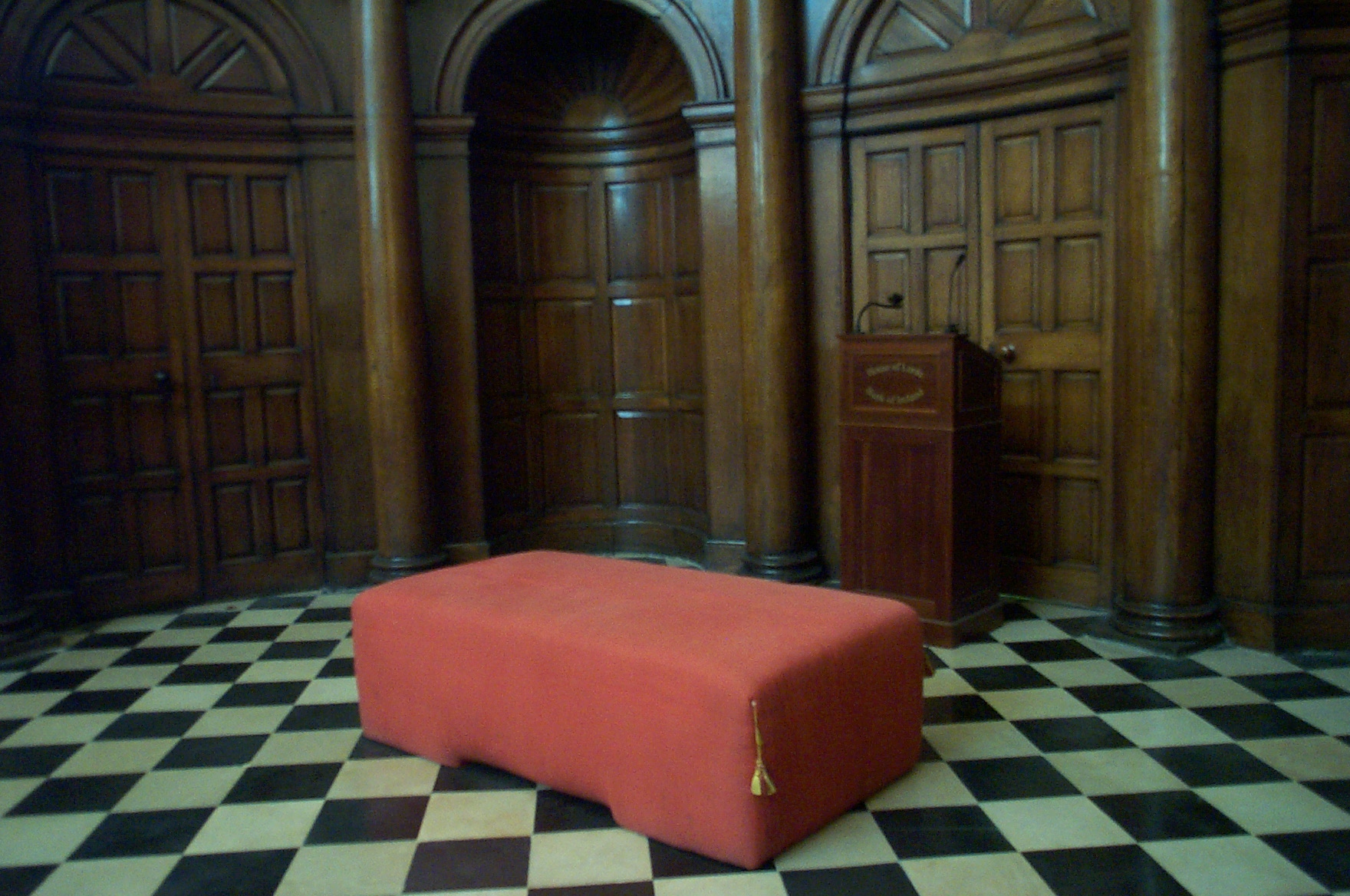
The Woolsack in the chamber of the House of Lords

After 1707, Ireland was, to varying degrees, subordinate to the Kingdom of Great Britain. The Parliament of Ireland had control over only legislation, while the executive branch of government, under the Lord Lieutenant, answered to the British government in London. Furthermore, the Penal Laws meant that Catholics, who constituted the majority of Irish people, were not permitted to sit in, or participate in elections to, the parliament. Meanwhile, building upon the precedent of Poynings' Law which required approval from the British Privy Council for bills to be put to the Irish Parliament, the Dependency of Ireland on Great Britain Act 1719 declared the British Parliament's right to legislate for Ireland and the British House of Lords appellate jurisdiction over its courts.

The effects of this subordination of Irish Parliamentary power soon became evident, as Ireland slowly stagnated economically and the Protestant population shrank in relative size. Additionally, the growing relative wealth of the American colonies, whose local authorities were relatively independent of the British Parliament, provided additional ammunition for those who wished to increase Irish Parliamentary power. When the British governments started centralising trade, taxation and judicial review throughout the Empire, the Irish Parliament saw an ally in the American colonies, who were growing increasingly resistant to the British government's objectives. When open rebellion broke out in the American colonies in 1775, the Irish Parliament passed several initiatives which showed support for the American grievances.

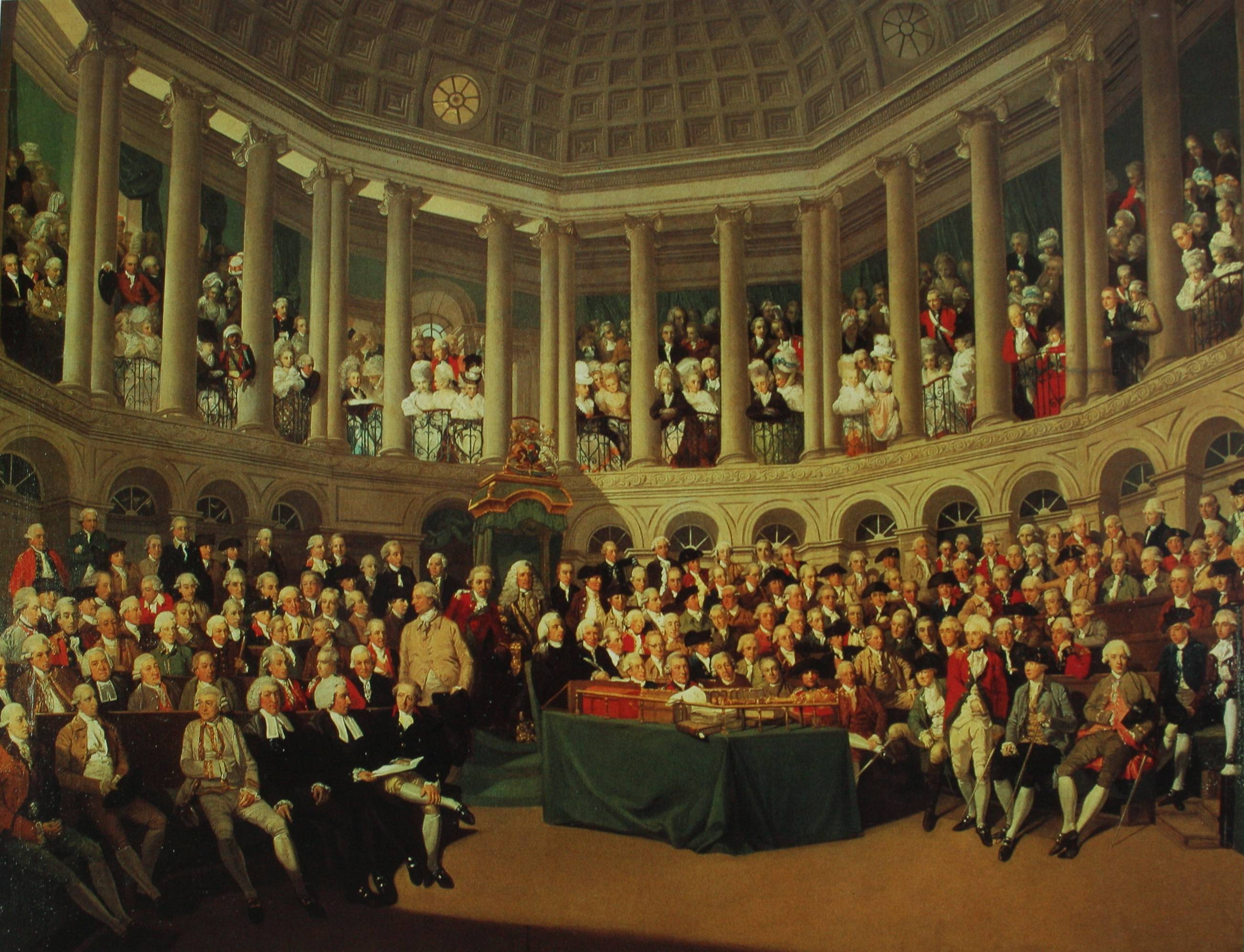
The House of Commons in session (by Francis Wheatley, 1780)

Fearing another split by Ireland, as rebellion spread through the American colonies and various European powers joined in a global assault on British interests, the British Parliament became more acquiescent to Irish demands. In 1782, following agitation by major parliamentary figures, most notably Henry Grattan, supported by the Patriot movement, the Irish parliament's authority was greatly increased. Under what became known as the Constitution of 1782 the restrictions imposed by Poyning's Law were removed by the Repeal of Act for Securing Dependence of Ireland Act 1782. Grattan also wanted Catholic involvement in Irish politics; the Roman Catholic Relief Act 1793 passed by the Irish parliament copied the British Roman Catholic Relief Act 1791, and Catholics were given back the right to cast votes in elections to the parliament, although they were still debarred from membership and state offices.

== Organisation ==
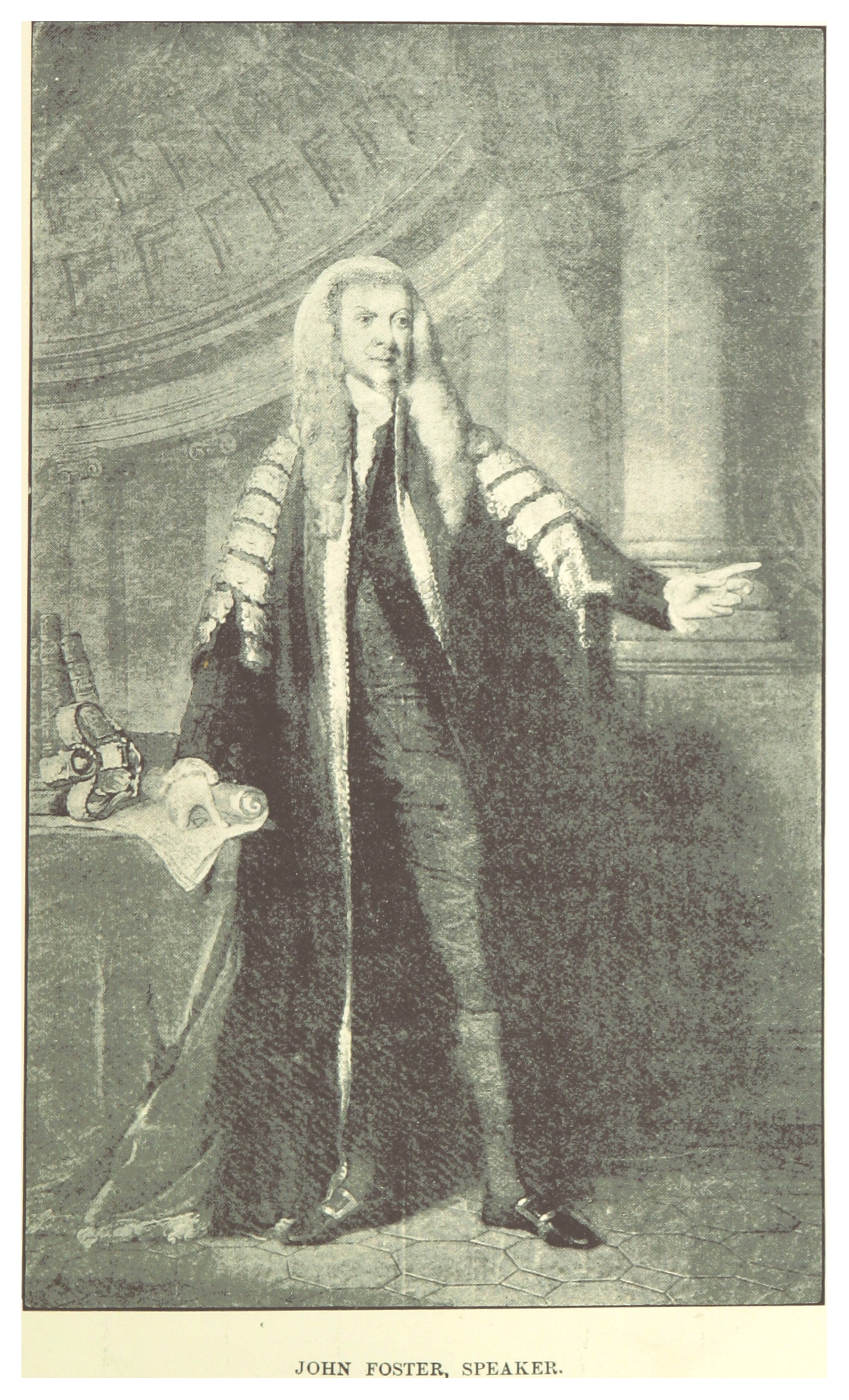
John Foster, last speaker of the Irish House of Commons (1807–1811)

The House of Lords was presided over by the Lord Chancellor, who sat on the woolsack, a large seat stuffed with wool from each of the three lands of England, Ireland and Scotland. In the Commons, business was presided over by the Speaker who, in the absence of a government chosen from and answerable to the Commons, was the dominant political figure in the parliament. Speaker Conolly remains today one of the most widely known figures produced by the Irish parliament.

Much of the public ceremonial in the Irish parliament mirrored that of the British Parliament. Sessions were formally opened by the Speech from the Throne by the Lord Lieutenant, who, it was written "used to sit surrounded by more splendour than His Majesty on the throne of England". The Lord Lieutenant, when he sat on the throne, sat beneath a canopy of crimson velvet. At the state opening, MPs were summoned to the House of Lords from the House of Commons chamber by Black Rod, a royal official who would "command the members on behalf of His Excellency to attend him in the chamber of peers".

Engraving of section of the Irish House of Commons chamber by Peter Mazell based on the drawing by Rowland Omer 1767

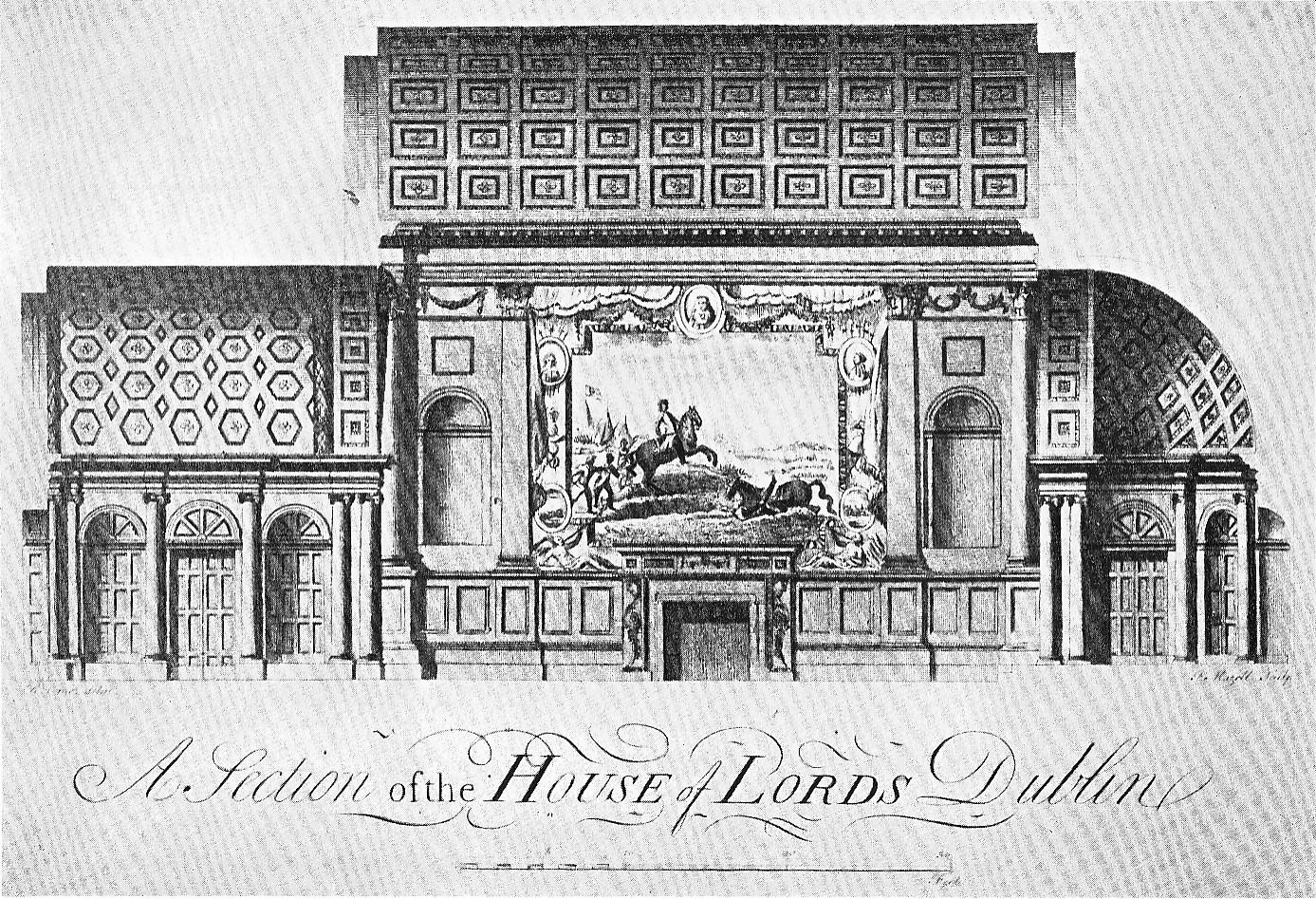
Engraving of section of the Irish House of Lords chamber by Peter Mazell based on the drawing by Rowland Omer 1767

Sessions of Parliament drew many of the wealthiest of Ireland's Anglo-Irish elite to Dublin, particularly as sessions often coincided with the social season, (January to 17 March) when the Lord Lieutenant presided in state over state balls and drawing rooms in the Viceregal Apartments in Dublin Castle. Leading peers in particular flocked to Dublin, where they lived in enormous and richly decorated mansions initially on the northside of Dublin, later in new Georgian residences around Merrion Square and Fitzwilliam Square. Their presence in Dublin, along with large numbers of servants, provided a regular boost to the city economy.

The Parliament's records were published from the 1750s and provide a huge wealth of commentary and statistics on the reality of running Ireland at the time. In particular, minute details on Ireland's increasing overseas trade and reports from various specialist committees are recorded. By the 1780s they were published by two rival businesses, King & Bradley and Grierson.

== The Act of Union and abolition ==
From 31 December 1800, the Parliament of Ireland was abolished entirely, when the Acts of Union 1800 created the United Kingdom of Great Britain and Ireland and merged the British and Irish legislatures into a single Parliament of the United Kingdom after 1 January 1801.

The idea of a political union between Ireland and Great Britain had been proposed several times throughout the 18th century, but was vehemently opposed in Ireland. The granting of legislative independence to Ireland in 1782 was thought to have ended hopes of a union. Relations between the two parliaments became strained in 1789 during the illness of King George III, when the Irish parliament invited the Prince of Wales to become the Regent of Ireland, before Westminster had been able to make its own decision on the matter. The Irish Rebellion of 1798 saw a French expedition landing in Killala, causing alarm that Ireland could be used as a base for attacks on Britain, resurrecting the idea of political union between Ireland and Great Britain. The British Prime Minister, William Pitt the Younger had the strong support of King George III for a union, with the king advising him on 13 July 1798 that the rebellion should be used "for frightening the supporters of the Castle into a Union". The Protestant Ascendancy was also seen as being unequal in the task of governing Ireland, and that such a "corrupt, dangerous and inefficient system" had to be done away with.

In June 1798, Lord Cornwallis was appointed Lord Lieutenant of Ireland, with one of his main tasks to be securing support in Ireland for a union. Cornwallis would report that "The mass of the people of Ireland do not care one farthing about the Union".

For the idea to succeed, Pitt knew that he needed large scale public support in Ireland for the idea from both Protestants and Catholics, and as such Catholic Emancipation would need to be delivered along with the union. Catholic Emancipation alone he knew would be enough to secure the stability of Ireland. The Catholic middle classes and the Catholic hierarchy, led by John Thomas Troy, the Archbishop of Dublin, were willing to support the union if Catholic Emancipation did indeed follow. Only a group of Catholic barristers, most notably Daniel O'Connell, opposed the idea of union.

For Protestants, the Presbyterians, who were largely involved in the rebellion of 1798 would shed no tears over the end of the Irish parliament. The Orange Order tried to be neutral on the issue of union, however thirty-six lodges from counties Armagh and Louth alone petitioned against the Union. The fear for some Protestants, especially those part of the Protestant Ascendancy, was that Catholic emancipation would immediately follow any union. The artisans and merchants of Dublin also feared any union as it might have resulted in a loss of business.

When William Pitt's idea of union and emancipation was revealed to the cabinet of the Irish parliament, the Speaker and Chancellor of the Exchequer both vehemently opposed it. The rest of the cabinet supported the idea however were split on the issue of Catholic Emancipation, resulting in it being dropped from the proposals. Cornwallis observed: "I certainly wish that England could now make a union with the Irish nation, instead of making it with a party in Ireland".

Any union between Ireland and Great Britain would have to be in the form of a treaty in all but name, meaning that any act of union would need to be passed separately in both the Dublin and Westminster parliaments. There was strong support for it in Westminster, however Dublin was not as keen.

An amendment was moved on 22 January 1799, seeking the House to maintain "the undoubted birthright of the people of Ireland to have a free and independent legislature". The debate which followed consisted of eighty speeches, made over the course of twenty-one uninterrupted hours. The next day a vote was held which resulted in a defeat of the amendment by one vote (106 to 105), however the following day another motion against any union passed 111 to 106.

Following these votes, Lord Castlereagh and Lord Cornwallis set about trying to win over as many Irish MPs as possible through bribery consisting of jobs, pensions, peerages, promotions, along with other enticements. These methods were all legal and not unusual for the time. They also spent over £1,250,000 buying the support of those who held the seats of boroughs and counties.

When parliament reopened on 15 January 1800, high levels of passion ran throughout, and angry speeches were delivered by proponents on both sides. Henry Grattan, who had helped secure the Irish parliament's legislative independence in 1782, bought Wicklow borough at midnight for £1,200, and after dressing in his old Volunteer uniform, arrived at the House of Commons of the Irish parliament at 7 a.m., after which he gave a two-hour speech against the union. Regardless, a motion against the union failed by 138 votes to 96, and resolutions in favour of the union were passed with large majorities in both chambers of parliament.

The terms of the union were agreed on 28 March 1800 by both houses of the Irish Parliament. Two Acts with identical aims (but with different wording) were passed in both the British and Irish parliaments, with the British Act of Union becoming law on 2 July 1800, and royal assent given to the Irish Act of Union on 1 August 1800. The Irish Parliament met for the last time the following day. On 1 January 1801, the provisions of the Acts of Union came into force.

== See also ==
- Historical Irish legislatures
- List of acts of the Parliament of Ireland
- List of parliaments of Ireland
- Members of the pre-1801 Parliament of Ireland
- Parliament of Great Britain
- Parliament of the Republic of Ireland
- Parliament of the United Kingdom
