= Brian Boru's Fort =

Ringfort in County Clare, Ireland

- Béal Ború (Irish)
- Balboru
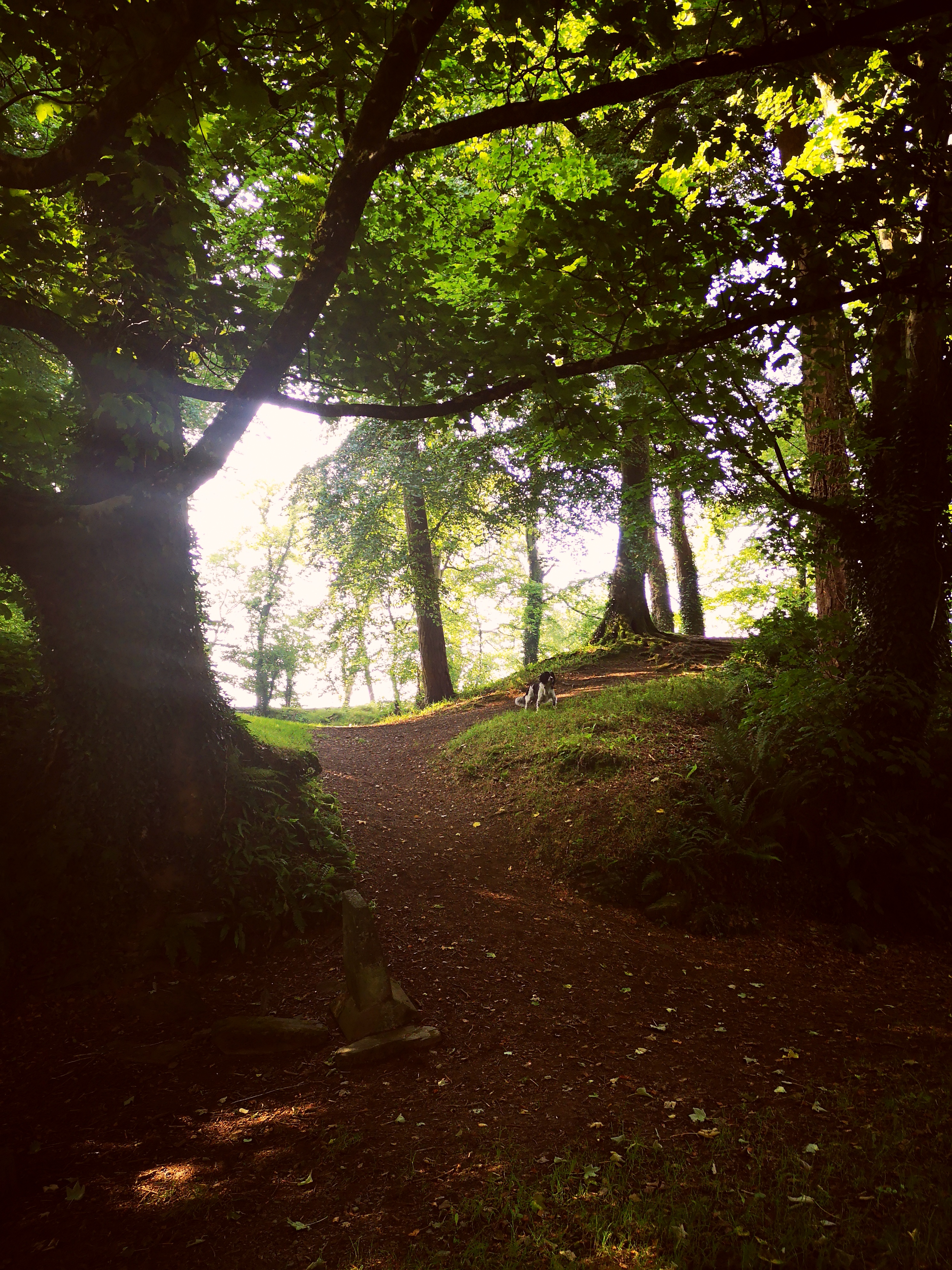

- Location within Ireland
- 52.818908°N 8.451578°W
- Type: ringfort
- Location: Ballyvally, Killaloe, County Clare, Ireland

History
- Built: 11th century

Site notes
- Elevation: 45 m (148 ft)
- Area: 0.29 ha (0.72 acres)

National monument of Ireland
- Official name: Brian Boru's Fort
- Reference no.: 591

Brian Boru's Fort, also called Béal Ború, is a ringfort and National Monument located in County Clare, Ireland.

== Location ==
Brian Boru's Fort is located immediately north of Killaloe, on the west bank of the River Shannon, commanding the southern entry to Lough Derg.

== History ==
Dáithí Ó hÓgáin claimed this site as the birthplace or childhood home of Brian Boru (c. 941 – 1014), High King of Ireland 1002–14; as an adult he was based further south at Kincora (in modern Killaloe).

Excavations in 1936 revealed over 800 stone implements, including ten stone axes, hammerstones and stone fishing sinkers for lines and nets, were found in the immediate neighbourhood. It is likely that it was occupied during the Stone Age. In 1961 Michael J. O'Kelly's excavations revealed a ringfort which had been inhabited, abandoned and later built over. A larger structure which included a bank and ditch was built at a later time.

The name Béal Bórumha means "mouth of cattle tribute"; it may have been at the fording-point here that the Dál gCais paid or received such tributes.

Brian Boru's fort was built in the eleventh century and stood possibly until 1116 when Tairrdelbach Ua Conchobair's men defeated the Ua Briain and destroyed Kincora. Later finds include Hiberno-Norse pennies minted c.1035–70, decorated slate, five bronze pins, a tangled stud, 25 nails, two small sherds of pottery, animal and bird bones and musket balls.

In 1207 the Normans tried to build a motte and bailey but were driven off. Geoffrey de Marisco instead built a castle at Killaloe in 1216.

== Description ==
The fort is a mound of earth 70 m (80 yd) in diameter.

The 1961 excavation discovered postholes of a rectangular wooden building with a central hearth near the western side of the enclosed area, situated perpendicular to the bank. It was approximately 4 m by 2.5 m (13 ft by 8 ft), with a paved entryway.

== In fiction ==
Béal Ború is mentioned in Morgan Llywelyn's 1990 novel Brian Boru: Emperor of the Irish, winner of a Bisto Award.
