= 1206 in Ireland =

- Centuries: 11th; 12th; 13th; 14th; 15th
- Decades: 1180s; 1190s; 1200s; 1210s; 1220s
- See also: Other events of 1206; List of years in Ireland

Events from the year 1206 in Ireland.

== Incumbent ==
- Lord: John

== Events ==
- The Anglo-Norman Bishop of Meath, Simon of Rochfort, transfers the See of Meath from Clonard, where it had been since its foundation by Finnian of Clonard in 520, to Trim.

== Deaths ==
- Tomás Láidir Mac Coisdealbhaigh, Irish soldier and poet
