= 1194 in Ireland =

- Centuries: 11th; 12th; 13th; 14th
- Decades: 1170s; 1180s; 1190s; 1200s; 1210s
- See also: Other events of 1194; List of years in Ireland

Events from the year 1194 in Ireland.

== Incumbent ==
- Lord: John

== Events ==
- Drogheda is chartered as a town.
- Simon Rochfort (also Simon de Rupeforti; died 1224) was the first English Bishop of Meath.

== Births ==
- Richard Mor de Burgh (died 1242) was the eldest son of William de Burgh and founder of the towns of Ballinasloe, Loughrea and Galway.

== Deaths ==
- Domnall Mór Ua Briain, King of Thomond
