= 1197 in Ireland =

- Centuries: 11th; 12th; 13th; 14th
- Decades: 1170s; 1180s; 1190s; 1200s; 1210s
- See also: Other events of 1197; List of years in Ireland

Events from the year 1197 in Ireland.

== Incumbent ==
- Lord: John

== Deaths ==
- Ruadhri Ua Flaithbertaigh, King of Iar Connacht
