= 1199 in Ireland =

- Centuries: 11th; 12th; 13th; 14th
- Decades: 1170s; 1180s; 1190s; 1200s; 1210s
- See also: Other events of 1199; List of years in Ireland

Events during the year 1199 in Ireland.

== Incumbent ==
- Lord: John

== Events ==
- 6 April – on the death of his brother, Richard I of England, Prince John, Lord of Ireland, becomes King of England, thus bringing Ireland under the direct rule of the English Crown.
- 6 July – Archbishop Malachy (died 1148) is canonized by Pope Clement III.
- Limerick is granted a charter as a city.
- Risteárd de Tiúit occupies the motte-and-bailey castle in Granard (Granard Motte) as part of an initiative to extend Hiberno-Norman control over the country.
- Milo le Bret, having been granted lands in Rathfarnham, adapted an existing ridge to build a motte and bailey

== Deaths ==
- Cathalan Ua Maelfhabaill, King of Carraic-Brachaidhe.
