= 1219 in Ireland =

- Centuries: 11th; 12th; 13th; 14th; 15th
- Decades: 1190s; 1200s; 1210s; 1220s; 1230s
- See also: Other events of 1219; List of years in Ireland

Events from the year 1219 in Ireland.

== Incumbent ==
- Lord: Henry III

== Events ==
- Sibella, the great-granddaughter of the Norman leader Strongbow, was granted the manor in Castlecomer.

== Deaths ==
- John de Courcy (also John de Courci), an Anglo-Norman knight.
