= 1205 in Ireland =

- Centuries: 11th; 12th; 13th; 14th; 15th
- Decades: 1180s; 1190s; 1200s; 1210s; 1220s
- See also: Other events of 1205; List of years in Ireland

Events from the year 1205 in Ireland.

== Incumbent ==
- Lord: John

== Events ==
- Enniscorthy Castle, an Anglo-Norman stronghold was built on high ground beside the River Slaney
- Hugh de Lacy, 1st Earl of Ulster was reappointed Viceroy of Ireland
