= 1203 in Ireland =

- Centuries: 11th; 12th; 13th; 14th; 15th
- Decades: 1180s; 1190s; 1200s; 1210s; 1220s
- See also: Other events of 1203; List of years in Ireland

Events from the year 1203 in Ireland.

== Incumbent ==
- Lord: John

== Events ==
- The House of Burke is founded during the Norman conquest
- William Marshal, 1st Earl of Pembroke founded Tintern Abbey (County Wexford)
