= 1211 in Ireland =

- Centuries: 11th; 12th; 13th; 14th; 15th
- Decades: 1190s; 1200s; 1210s; 1220s; 1230s
- See also: Other events of 1211; List of years in Ireland

Events from the year 1211 in Ireland.

== Incumbent ==
- Lord: John

== Events ==
- Walter de Lacy erected the castle on Turbet Island, Cavan, in the abortive Anglo-Norman attempt to gain control of West Ulster.
