= 1207 in Ireland =

- Centuries: 11th; 12th; 13th; 14th; 15th
- Decades: 1180s; 1190s; 1200s; 1210s; 1220s
- See also: Other events of 1207; List of years in Ireland

Events from the year 1207 in Ireland.

== Incumbent ==
- Lord: John

== Events ==
- The town of New Ross (the town of the new bridge) was granted a Royal Charter.
- Callan, County Kilkenny was founded by William the Marshall.
- The Normans attempted to build a motte and bailey at Brian Boru's Fort but were driven off
- Hugh de Lacy destroyed Clones Abbey and the town of Clones
