= 1204 in Ireland =

- Centuries: 11th; 12th; 13th; 14th; 15th
- Decades: 1180s; 1190s; 1200s; 1210s; 1220s
- See also: Other events of 1204; List of years in Ireland

Events from the year 1204 in Ireland.

== Incumbent ==
- Lord: John

== Events ==
- John de Courcy captured by Hugh de Lacy.
- Fairs Act enacted by John, King of England provides for the erection of a castle and fortifications at Dublin and the establishment of fairs at Donnybrook (near Dublin), Waterford and Limerick. It will be the oldest statute in force on the Irish statute book as of 2007.
- Duiske Abbey founded by William Marshal, 1st Earl of Pembroke.
- Old St. Mary's Church, Clonmel founded by William de Burgh, Lord of Connacht (probable date).

== Deaths ==
- 15 January – Gerald FitzMaurice, 1st Lord of Offaly, Cambro-Norman nobleman (born c.1150).
- Donnchadh Conallagh Ua Conchobair, Prince of Connacht.
- Muirchertach Tethbhach, Prince of Connacht (killed by his uncles).
