= 1196 in Ireland =

- Centuries: 11th; 12th; 13th; 14th
- Decades: 1170s; 1180s; 1190s; 1200s; 1210s
- See also: Other events of 1196; List of years in Ireland

Events from the year 1196 in Ireland.

== Incumbent ==
- Lord: John

== Deaths ==
- Mathghamhain mac Conchobar Maenmaige Ua Conchobair, Prince of Connacht
