= 1200 in Ireland =

- Centuries: 11th; 12th; 13th; 14th
- Decades: 1180s; 1190s; 1200s; 1210s; 1220s
- See also: Other events of 1200; List of years in Ireland

Events from the year 1200 in Ireland.

== Incumbent ==
- Lord: John

== Events ==
- Irish exchequer created.
- Theobald Walter, 1st Baron Butler is thought to have founded the Abbey of Woney or Wotheny in County Limerick Ireland around this time.
- John Comyn, Archbishop of Dublin, granted the church at Garristown to Llanthony Priory
