= 1202 in Ireland =

- Centuries: 11th; 12th; 13th; 14th; 15th
- Decades: 1180s; 1190s; 1200s; 1210s; 1220s
- See also: Other events of 1202; List of years in Ireland

Events from the year 1202 in Ireland.

== Incumbent ==
- Lord: John

== Events ==
- Cathal Crobhdearg Ua Conchobair succeeds Cathal Carragh Ua Conchobair as King of Connacht.

== Deaths ==
- Cathal Carragh Ua Conchobair, King of Connacht.
