= 1193 in Ireland =

- Centuries: 11th; 12th; 13th; 14th
- Decades: 1170s; 1180s; 1190s; 1200s; 1210s
- See also: Other events of 1193; List of years in Ireland

Events from the year 1193 in Ireland.

== Incumbent ==
- Lord: John

== Events ==
- Founding of Grey Abbey in County Down by Affreca de Courcy.
- Inishcloghbran is plundered by the sons of Jocelyn de Angulo and of Conchobar Maenmaige Ua Conchobair.
- King John (the then Prince of Moreton) gave the Crumlin church to form one prebend in the collegiate church of Saint Patrick.

== Deaths ==
- Derbforgaill, noblewoman (born 1108).
- Gilla Críst Ua Mucaráin, Bishop of Louth.
