= 1201 in Ireland =

- Centuries: 11th; 12th; 13th; 14th; 15th
- Decades: 1180s; 1190s; 1200s; 1210s; 1220s
- See also: Other events of 1201; List of years in Ireland

Events from the year 1201 in Ireland.

== Incumbent ==
- Lord: John

== Events ==
- William de Braose was installed by King John of England as the chief tenant of a very substantial territory encompassing most of the modern County Tipperary
- William de Burgh appointed Seneschal of Munster (Royal Governor)
