= 1210 in Ireland =

- Centuries: 11th; 12th; 13th; 14th; 15th
- Decades: 1190s; 1200s; 1210s; 1220s; 1230s
- See also: Other events of 1210; List of years in Ireland

Events from the year 1210 in Ireland.

== Incumbent ==
- Lord: John

== Events ==
- King John’s second visit to Ireland.
- Earldom of Ulster and Honor of Limerick are confiscated.
- Submission of Irish kings.
- King John sets up a civil government in Ireland.

== Deaths ==
- Risteárd de Tiúit, Norman invader and Lord Chief Justice of Ireland.
