= Henry de Loundres =

Irish bishop

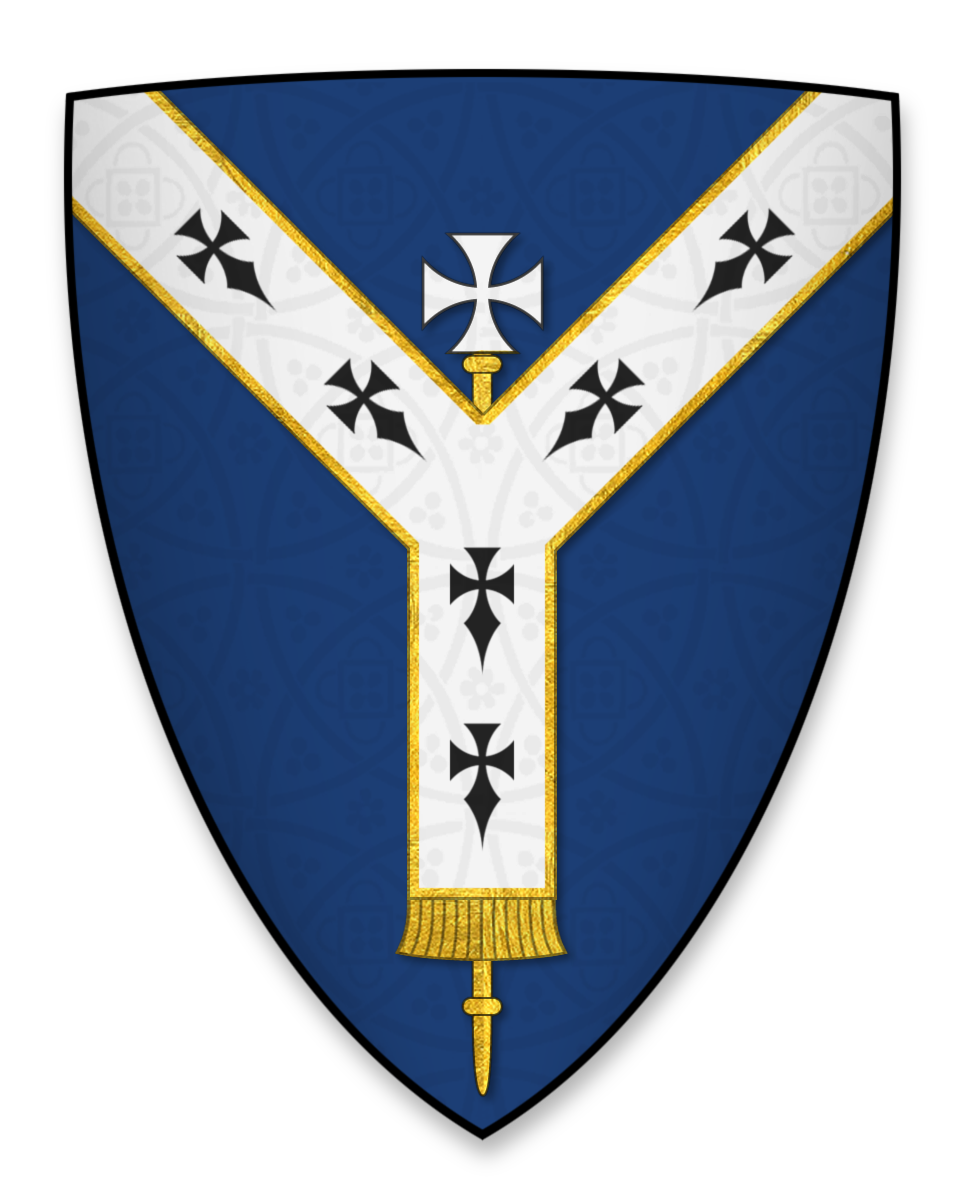
Arms displayed by Henry de Loundres as Archbishop of Dublin, at the signing of Magna Charta

Henry de Loundres (died 1228) was an Anglo-Norman churchman who was Archbishop of Dublin from 1213 to 1228. He was an influential figure in the reign of John of England, an administrator and loyalist to the king. He is mentioned in the text of Magna Carta, the terms of which he helped to negotiate.

He was dean of Stafford in 1207 and commissioned a church in Penkridge. He had continuing interests in Staffordshire.

He was justiciar in Ireland from 1213, his deputy Geoffery de Marisco executing the responsibilities during the bishop's absence in Rome. He unsuccessfully attempted to have one of his clerks appointed Bishop of Cork in 1214. He was resisted by Donnchad Ua Longargain, Archbishop of Cashel, in his attempts to make the church hierarchy in Ireland more Anglo-Norman.

He organized his archdiocese and made his cathedral see at the enlarged St. Patrick's Cathedral, Dublin. He was a major figure in the completion of Dublin Castle by 1230, and had a hostel for pilgrims built in Dublin. In 1220 he ordered the extinction of the flame that kept burning in Kildare Abbey, as a remaining pagan association. He claimed to be Primate of Ireland, in opposition to the rival claim of the Archbishop of Armagh: the struggle for supremacy between the Sees of Dublin and Armagh was to last for centuries.

== Notes ==
Catholic Church titles
Preceded by John Comyn	Archbishop of Dublin; 1230–1255	Succeeded by Luke
