= 1209 in Ireland =

- Centuries: 11th; 12th; 13th; 14th; 15th
- Decades: 1180s; 1190s; 1200s; 1210s; 1220s
- See also: Other events of 1209; List of years in Ireland

Events from the year 1209 in Ireland.

== Incumbent ==
- Lord: John

== Events ==
- Easter Monday – Black Monday: A group of 500 settlers recently arrived in Dublin from Bristol are massacred without warning by warriors of the Gaelic O'Byrne clan near a wood at Ranelagh.
