= History of Irish legislatures =

A number of legislatures have existed in Ireland since mediaeval times. The first Irish legislature was the Parliament of Ireland. However, after its abolition, in 1801, there was no legislature in Ireland, of any kind until 1919. Since that date a number of legislatures have existed on the island.

== Parliament of Ireland ==
This body consisted of the King of Ireland and two chambers: the Irish House of Commons and the Irish House of Lords) which existed in Lordship of Ireland (1171–1541) and the Kingdom of Ireland (1541–1800). This parliament operated under major restrictions, including Poynings' Law and the Penal Laws, imposed by the English and British Crown, by the English and British Parliament and by the King-in-Council. Many of these restrictions were removed in 1782, producing what became known as the Constitution of 1782. The Kingdom of Ireland merged with the Kingdom of Great Britain to form the United Kingdom of Great Britain and Ireland in 1801.

It was subject to an Irish executive, presided over by the English/British selected Lord Lieutenant of Ireland (previously called the 'Lord Deputy'), which was ultimately answerable not to it but to the English/British Government in London.

Over the centuries, the Irish parliament met in a number of locations both inside and outside Dublin. Among its most famous meeting places were Dublin Castle, the Bluecoat School, Chichester House and its final permanent home, the Irish Houses of Parliament in College Green, also sometimes called the Irish Parliament House. It is now generally called the "Bank of Ireland", an institution which took ownership of the building in 1804 and used it as its headquarters until the 1970s, when a new headquarters was built. The former seat of parliament remains a branch of the bank.

In 1642–49, during the Wars of the Three Kingdoms, there was brief experiment in independent Irish government known as Confederate Ireland. Its legislature, the General Assembly, met once a year in Kilkenny to review the work of the executive branch (which it appointed) - the Supreme Council.

== Dáil Éireann (1919–1922) ==
This was a revolutionary parliament formed by Irish MPs elected to the British House of Commons, who assembled in Dublin in January 1919. Dáil Éireann operated under a temporary constitution, called the Dáil Constitution, which created a prime minister called the President of Dáil Éireann (also known as Príomh Aire) and a Ministry of Dáil Éireann. During the period from August 1921 to January 1922, Éamon de Valera used the title President of the Irish Republic.

The Dáil met in two locations, in the Round Room of the Mansion House, and later in the then University College Dublin campus in Earslfort Terrace in Dublin, where its famously ratified the Anglo-Irish Treaty in December 1921.

== Parliament of Southern Ireland (1920–1922) ==
The Parliament of Southern Ireland was created by the Government of Ireland Act 1920, and consisted of the House of Commons of Southern Ireland and the Senate. This parliament did not in reality function, except to ratify the Anglo-Irish Treaty in January 1922. In 1922, a government theoretically answerable to the House of Commons of Southern Ireland, called the Provisional Government of Ireland, was created under Michael Collins.

The House of Commons was officially based in the Royal College of Science in Dublin, now the Irish Government Buildings. However the Commons only met on a handful of occasions, primarily to ratify the Treaty in January 1922 and confirm Michael Collins as head of the Provisional Government.

== Oireachtas of the Irish Free State (1922–1937) ==
This legislature consisted of the King and two chambers: the Free State Dáil and the Free State Seanad (Senate of Ireland). It created by the Irish Free State's 1922 Constitution. The Seanad and the King's role in the Oireachtas were both abolished by constitutional amendment in 1936. The executive was answerable to Dáil Éireann, was called the Executive Council and was presided over by a prime minister called the President of the Executive Council.

The Provisional Government under W. T. Cosgrave hired the use of the main lecture theatre of the Royal Dublin Society in its headquarters in Leinster House, a formal ducal palace, to enable a formal state opening of the new two chamber Oireachtas of the new Irish Free State and the delivery of the speech from the throne by the new Governor-General of the Irish Free State, Tim Healy in December 1922. In 1924, the new Free State under Cosgrave bought Leinster House as a temporary seat of parliament, pending the erection or conversion of an alternative. One major contender for the location was Royal Hospital Kilmainham, a former soldiers' home that ultimately became a modern art gallery.

== Oireachtas Éireann (since 1937) ==
This Oireachtas consists of the President of Ireland and two chambers: the modern Dáil Éireann and Seanad Éireann. It was established by the 1937 Constitution. The executive is called the Government and is answerable to the Dáil. It is presided over by a prime minister called the Taoiseach. Though plans were periodically discussed for the erection of a new parliament building (a site was even considered in the Phoenix Park), parliament has remained in Leinster House, to which additional offices were added in the 1950s and most recently in the year 2000.

== Legislatures in Northern Ireland ==
- Parliament of Northern Ireland - a home rule parliament of 1920–1972.
- Sunningdale Northern Ireland Assembly - a home rule assembly established in 1972.
- Northern Ireland Assembly (1982) - a home rule assembly established in 1982.
- Modern Northern Ireland Assembly - a home rule assembly established in 1998.
