= 1208 in Ireland =

- Centuries: 11th; 12th; 13th; 14th; 15th
- Decades: 1180s; 1190s; 1200s; 1210s; 1220s
- See also: Other events of 1208; List of years in Ireland

Events from the year 1208 in Ireland.

== Incumbent ==
- Lord: John

== Events ==
- The town and lands of Fethard, County Tipperary were lost to its founder, William de Braose, following a dispute he had with King John of England.
- Auliffe O'Rothlain, Chief of Calry of Coolcarney, was slain by O'Moran.
