= 1215 in Ireland =

- Centuries: 11th; 12th; 13th; 14th; 15th
- Decades: 1190s; 1200s; 1210s; 1220s; 1230s
- See also: Other events of 1215; List of years in Ireland

Events from the year 1215 in Ireland.

== Incumbent ==
- Lord: John

== Events ==
- 11 November – Echdonn Mac Gilla Uidir, Archbishop of Armagh, attends the Fourth Council of the Lateran in Rome.
- The port of New Ross is granted trading concessions from John, King of England.
- Sir Geoffrey de Luterel is granted the townland of Cratloe in County Clare, including the Cratloe Woods.
