= 1216 in Ireland =

- Centuries: 11th; 12th; 13th; 14th; 15th
- Decades: 1190s; 1200s; 1210s; 1220s; 1230s
- See also: Other events of 1216; List of years in Ireland

Events from the year 1216 in Ireland.

== Incumbent ==
- Lord: John (until 19 October), then Henry III

== Events ==
- 25 February – Pope Innocent III confirms union of the vacant episcopal see of the Bishop of Glendalough with that of the Archbishop of Dublin (Henry de Loundres).
- After 11 August – Echdonn Mac Gilla Uidir, Archbishop of Armagh, dies in Rome.
- 18/19 October – death of John, King of England and Lord of Ireland; he is succeeded by his 9-year-old son Henry.
- 12 November – Great Charter of Ireland ("Magna Carta Hiberniae") issued in the name of King Henry III of England.
- The abbots of Jerpoint and Mellifont Abbeys are deposed by the Cistercians' general chapter.
- Ballintubber Abbey is founded by King Cathal Crobhdearg Ua Conchobair of Connacht.
- Following resignation of the Bishop of Mayo (? Patricius) the see is transferred to the Archbishop of Tuam (Felix Ua Ruanada).
- Castle at Killaloe built by Geoffrey de Marisco, Justiciar of Ireland.
- The deanery of Kells was created by Simon Rochfort, Bishop of Meath
