= 1214 =

1214 in various calendars
- Gregorian calendar: 1214; MCCXIV
- Ab urbe condita: 1967
- Armenian calendar: 663; ԹՎ ՈԿԳ
- Assyrian calendar: 5964
- Balinese saka calendar: 1135–1136
- Bengali calendar: 620–621
- Berber calendar: 2164
- English Regnal year: 15 Joh. 1 – 16 Joh. 1
- Buddhist calendar: 1758
- Burmese calendar: 576
- Byzantine calendar: 6722–6723
- Chinese calendar: 癸酉年 (Water Rooster); 3911 or 3704 — to — 甲戌年 (Wood Dog); 3912 or 3705
- Coptic calendar: 930–931
- Discordian calendar: 2380
- Ethiopian calendar: 1206–1207
- Hebrew calendar: 4974–4975
- Hindu calendars
- Vikram Samvat: 1270–1271
- Shaka Samvat: 1135–1136
- Kali Yuga: 4314–4315
- Holocene calendar: 11214
- Igbo calendar: 214–215
- Iranian calendar: 592–593
- Islamic calendar: 610–611
- Japanese calendar: Kenpō 2 (建保２年)
- Javanese calendar: 1122–1123
- Julian calendar: 1214; MCCXIV
- Korean calendar: 3547
- Minguo calendar: 698 before ROC 民前698年
- Nanakshahi calendar: −254
- Thai solar calendar: 1756–1757
- Tibetan calendar: ཆུ་མོ་བྱ་ལོ་ (female Water-Bird); 1340 or 959 or 187 — to — ཤིང་ཕོ་ཁྱི་ལོ་ (male Wood-Dog); 1341 or 960 or 188

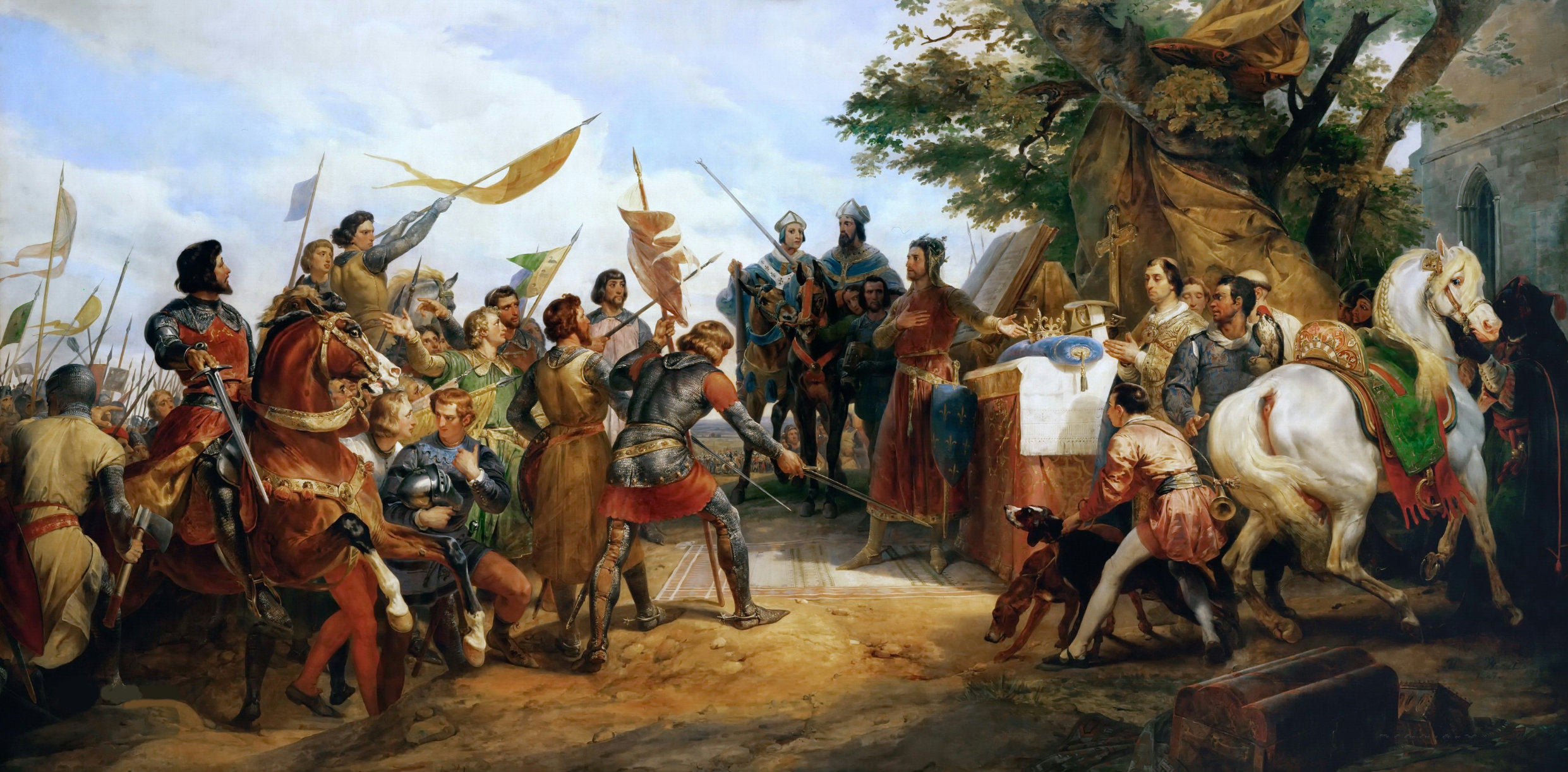
King Philip II of France (right) accepts the surrender at the Battle of Bouvines

Year 1214 (MCCXIV) was a common year starting on Wednesday of the Julian calendar, the 1214th year of the Common Era (CE) and Anno Domini (AD) designations, the 214th year of the 2nd millennium, the 14th year of the 13th century, and the 5th year of the 1210s decade.

== Events ==
=== By place ===
==== Byzantine Empire ====
- November 1 – Siege of Sinope: The Seljuk Turks under Sultan Kaykaus I capture the strategic Black Sea port city of Sinope – at the time held by the Empire of Trebizond (one of the Byzantine successor states formed after the Fourth Crusade). Emperor Alexios I of Trebizond leads an army to break the siege, but he is defeated and captured. His capture forces the Byzantines to accept tributary status to Kaykaus.

==== Europe ====
- February 15 – John, King of England ("Lackland") lands with an invasion force (accompanied by mercenaries) at La Rochelle; many barons of England refuse to join him in the campaign. John sends his half-brother William Longespée ("Long Sword") to Flanders, with money to assemble a mercenary army there. John pushes the French forces northeast from Poitou towards Paris, while Emperor Otto IV marches southwest from Flanders. King Philip II of France (Augustus) decides to defend his territories by leaving a third of his army under his son, Prince Louis to confront John in the Loire Valley – while Philip heads for Flanders to raid the region. On July 2, John's forces are confronted by a French relief force while they besiege the castle of Roche-au-Moine. John retreats to La Rochelle, but his rearguard suffers immensely by the French army.
- June – Otto IV arrives in Flanders with a small army; four German nobles have joined him, but he is soon reinforced by troops of Renaud I, duke of Boulogne, Ferdinand, (jure uxoris) count of Flanders and the mercenaries under William Longespée. On July 26, Philip II arrives at the Flemish town of Tournai with his army (some 7,000 men), while the allied forces encamp 12 kilometers south at the Castle of Mortagne (France).
- July 2 – The Papal Interdict of 1208, laid against the Kingdom of England, is lifted.
- July 27 – Battle of Bouvines: Philip II defeats an army (some 9,000 men) of German, English and Flemish soldiers led by Otto IV near Bouvines, ending the Anglo-French War. The French forces have taken a considerable number of soldiers prisoner, including 131 knights and five counts with Ferdinand, Renaud I and William Longespée among them.
- September 18 – Treaty of Chinon: John of England makes a truce with Philip II at the Castle of Chinon, and recognizes the Capetian (French) territorial gains at the expense of the Angevin Empire.
- October 5 – Upon the death of their father, King Alfonso VIII of Castile ("the Noble"), and of their mother, Eleanor of England, Queen of Castile on October 31, Berenguela becomes regent of her 10-year-old brother, Henry I.
- November 20 – A group of English nobles, after finding a copy of the Charter of Liberties, swear an oath at the altar of Bury St Edmunds, to force King John to acknowledge their rights.
- December 4 – King William the Lion of Scotland dies after a 49-year reign at Stirling. He is succeeded by his son, Alexander II, who is crowned at Scone (until 1249).

==== Asia ====
- Spring – Emperor Xuan Zong of the Jurchen-led Chinese Jin dynasty surrenders to the Mongols under Genghis khan – who have besieged the capital of Zhongdu (modern-day Beijing) for a year. He is forced to pay tribute (including some 3,000 horses, 10,000 'bolts' of silk and his daughter), along with subjugation to the Mongol Khan. Xuan Zong abandons northern China and moves his court to Kaifeng.
- After securing all Jin lands north of the Yellow River, Genghis Khan receives a message that Xuan Zong has moved his capital to Kaifeng. He returns to Zhongdu and precedes the city with the help of thousands of Chinese engineers. The Mongols starve the city out (the inhabitants are forced to eat the dead). The garrison, with a short supply of ammunition for the cannons holds out for the winter.
- In his campaigns in Liaodong, the Mongol general Muqali (or Mukhali) forms a newly Khitan-Chinese army and a special corps of some 12,000 Chinese auxiliary troops.

=== By topic ===
==== Education ====
- June 20 – A papal ordinance defines the rights of the scholars at the University of Oxford in England.

==== Religion ====
- April 13 – Simon of Apulia is elected bishop of Exeter in England (approximate date).

== Births ==
- April 25 – Louis IX ("the Saint"), king of France (d. 1270)
- July 29 – Sturla Þórðarson, Icelandic chieftain (d. 1284)
- Alberto da Bergamo, Italian Dominican tertiary (d. 1279)
- Al-Qurtubi, Moorish scholar, jurist and writer (d. 1273)
- Isabella of England, Holy Roman Empress (d. 1241)
- Ottaviano degli Ubaldini, Italian cardinal (d. 1273)
- Ugolino della Gherardesca, Italian nobleman (approximate date) (d. 1289)

== Deaths ==
- January 25 – Taira no Tokuko, Japanese empress (b. 1155)
- February 13 – Theobald I, Count of Bar (or Thibauld), French nobleman
- April 16 or 26 – Henry VI, Count Palatine of the Rhine ("the Younger"), German nobleman (b. 1196)
- April 21 – John of Ford, English Cistercian prior and abbot
- June 24 – Gilbert Glanvill (or Glanville), bishop of Rochester
- July 27 – Stephen Longchamp, Norman nobleman and knight
- August 18 – Pedro Fernández de Castro, Spanish nobleman
- August 30 – Peter of Capua the Elder, Italian cardinal and papal legate
- September 14 – Albert of Vercelli, Latin patriarch of Jerusalem
- September 16 – Diego López II de Haro, Spanish nobleman (b. 1152)
- October 5 – Alfonso VIII ("the Noble"), king of Castile (b. 1155)
- October 18 – John de Gray (or de Grey), bishop of Norwich
- October 31 – Eleanor of England, queen of Castile (b. 1161)
- December 4 – William the Lion, king of Scotland (b. 1142)
- December 8 – Sasaki Takatsuna, Japanese samurai (b. 1160)
- Ala al-Din Atsiz, ruler of the Ghurid Sultanate (b. 1159)
- Aubrey de Vere, English nobleman and knight (b. 1163)
- Filocalo Navigajoso, Latin ruler (megadux) of Lemnos
- Neophytos of Cyprus, Cypriot priest and hermit (b. 1134)
- Robert fitzRoger, English Sheriff of Norfolk and Suffolk
- William I of Cagliari, ruler (judge) of Sardinia (b. 1160)
