= Muintir Murchada =

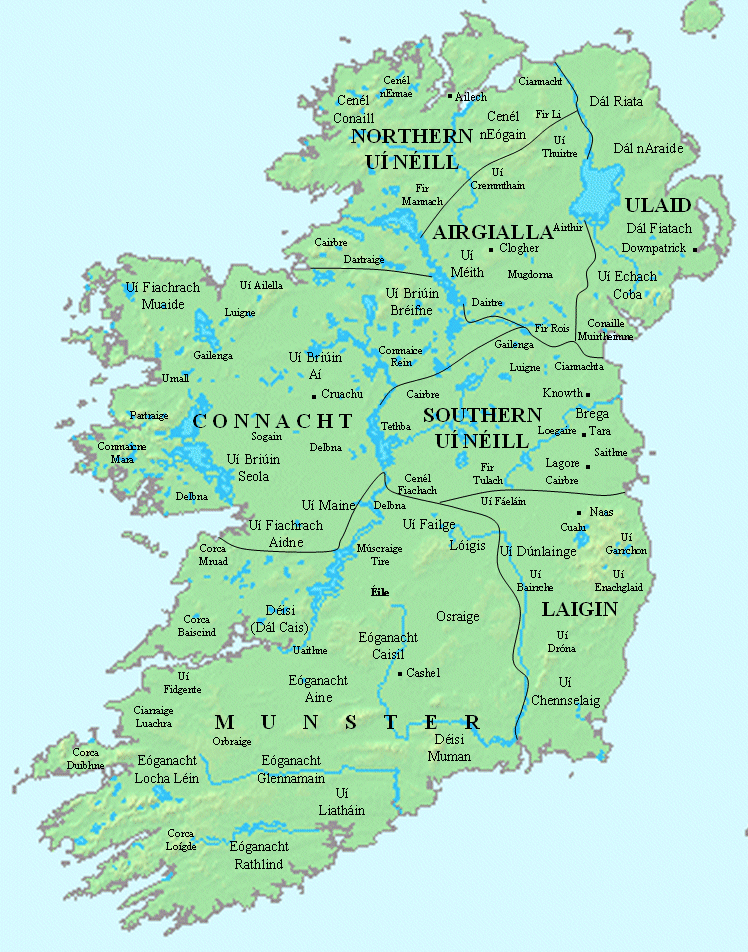
Early peoples and kingdoms of Ireland, c.800

Muintir Murchada was the name of an Irish territory which derived its name from the ruling dynasty, who were in turn a branch of the Uí Briúin. The name was derived from Murchadh mac Maenach, King of Uí Briúin Seóla, who died 891.

== Overview ==
The ruling dynasty was first recorded as a lineage in 1061 and by 1238 the term denoted the territory. It came under the control of the Uí Briúin about the 11th century, its original rulers taking the surname Ó Flaithbheartaigh (O'Flaherty). They were expelled by the Ua Conchobhair Kings of Connacht to Iar Connacht where they are still to be found.

Muintir Murchada appears to have comprised the following parishes: Killursa, Kilkilvery, Killeany, Kilcoona, Cargin, Killower, Cummer. It also is thought to have included parts of Belclare, Donaghpatrick, Corofin, Tuam, Kilbennan and Killererin.

Crichaireacht cinedach nduchasa Muintiri Murchada is a tract dating to the reign of its lord, Flaithbertaigh Ua Flaithbertaigh (died 1098), who ruled as King of Connacht from 1092 to 1098. It lists the main families and their estates within Muintir Murchada.

== Kings of Maigh Seóla ==
- Donn mac Cumasgach, died 752
- Maelan mac Cathmogha, died 848
- Murchadh mac Maenach, died 896
- Cléirchén mac Murchadh, died 908
- Urchadh mac Murchadh, died 943
- Donnchadh mac Urchadh, died 959
- Brian mac Maelruanaidh, died 959
- Muireadhach ua Flaithbheartach, died 1034
- Murchadh an Chapail Ua Flaithbheartaigh, died 1036
- Cathal mac Ruaidhri, died 1043
- Amhalgaidh mac Cathal, died 1075

== Kings of Iar Connacht ==
- Rúaidhri Ua Flaithbheartaigh, died 1061
- Aedh Ua Flaithbheartaigh, died 1079
- Mac meic Aedh Ua Flaithbheartaigh, died 1091
- Flaithbertaigh Ua Flaithbertaigh, died 1098
- Ruaidhri Ua Flaithbheartaigh, died 1145
- Áedh Ua Flaithbheartaigh, died 1178
- Ruadhri Ua Flaithbertaigh, alive 1197
- Murtough Ua Flaithbertaigh, died 1204
- Rudhraighe Ó Flaithbheartaigh, fl. 1214
- Áedh Mór Ó Flaithbheartaigh, died 1236
- Morogh Ó Flaithbheartaigh, fl. 1244
- Ruaidhri Ó Flaithbheartaigh, fl. 1256–1273

== Taoiseach of Iar Connacht ==
- Brian Ó Flaithbheartaigh, died 1377.
- Áedh Ó Flaithbheartaigh, c. 1377–1407; built the church at Annaghdown
- Domnell mac Áedh Ó Flaithbheartaigh, d. 1410
- Murchad mac Brian Ó Flaithbheartaigh, d. 1419
- Gilla Dubh Ó Flaithbheartaigh, d. 1442
- unnamed Ó Flaithbheartaigh, fl. 1503
- Áodh Ó Flaithbheartaigh, fl. 1538

== Ó Flaithbheartaigh Iarthair (the Western Ó Flaithbheartaigh) ==
- Domnell Crone Ó Flaithbheartaigh, fl. 1559

== Ó Flaithbheartaigh Oirthir (the Eastern Ó Flaithbheartaigh) ==
- Murrough na dTuadh Ó Flaithbheartaigh, fl. 1560–1593.

== Crichaireacht cinedach nduchasa Muintiri Murchada ==
Crichaireacht cinedach nduchasa Muintiri Murchada is a tract concerning the medieval territory called Muintir Murchada, located in County Galway, Ireland.

=== Outline ===
It lists forty place-names and more than seventy tribal, sept or family names and surnames, many still identifiable in the county.

It exists in three recensions preserved in the following three manuscripts:

- TCD MS 1319 [=H.2.17], 188RB-va, undated but possibly penned some time in the fifteenth century.
- RIA MS 536 [=23 P 12], 90ac-b – the Book of Ballymote, compiled about 1390.
- UCD Add. MS 14 – Leabhar na nGenealach by Dubhaltach Mac Fhirbhisigh

=== Family surnames ===
Surnames listed include:

- Ó hAllmhuráin (Halloran)
- Ó Ceanndubháin (Canavan)
- Ó Dathlaoich (Daly/Dolly)
- Ó Laoi (Lee)
- Ó Flaithbhertaigh (Flaherty)
- Mac Giolla Cheallaigh (Kilkelly)
- Ó Faghartaigh (Faherty)
- Ó Muirghile (Ó Muraíle)

=== The text ===
"204.6: The native family-stocks of Muintir Mhurchadha and their territory here. Ó hAllmhuráin was chieftain of the twenty-four townlands of Clann Fhearghaile, and in truth they belong to the family of Aonghus s. Brian; from Fearghal s. Muireadhach s. Eochaidh s. Eórrán s. Aonghaus s. Brian) is Clann Fhearghaile, i.e., the twenty-four townlands of Clann Fhearghaile, and Uí Fhearghusa of Ros Cam."

"204.7: Mág an Ghamhain (or Meic an Ghamhna) and Mág Catharnaigh are the two chieftains of Meadhraighe and have their own septs under them. (end pp.448–449)"

"240.8: Ó Dathlaoich was the chieftain of Uí Bhruin Ratha (or Ó Duilligh was the chieftain of the fourteen townlands of Uí Bhruin Ratha) and they belonged to the family of Cairbre Airdcheann s. Brian, and [they held] fourteen townlands of all Ui Bhruin Ratha, and belonging to them were Uí Cheinneidigh and Uí Dhuinn and Uí Fhionnog of Cnoc Tuagha and Uí Laideanain (or Laidhghin) of Leacach and Uí Challannain of Ceall Chathghaile (or [Ceall] Chatail] and Uí Cheannabhain, the physicians of Muintir Mhurchadha and Uí Oilealla, and they belong to Tuath na dToibrineadh. (Another book says 'Ui Fhlaithbheartaigh' where this says 'Muintir Mhurchadha'.)

"204.9: Ó Laidhigh were princes of Ui Bhriuin Seola together with their septs: Uí Fheichin, Uí Bhalbhain, Uí Dhuibh, Uí Mhadadhain, Meic Giolla Ghannain from Magh Lis Lionn ((a)) a different version: the cavalry chiefs of Ó Flaithbheartaigh) and Uí Cholgan ((b)) from Baile Uí Cholgan: the standard-bearers of Ó Flaithbheartaigh), Meic Fhionnain from Cill Chuanna and Uí Mhaoil Fhabhaill (or Maoil Ampuill) of Domhnach Padraig ((c)) the judges of Ó Flaithbheartaigh) and Uí Chleirchein of Rath Bhuidhbh and Uí Mheallaigh from Ceall na Manach and Ceall na gCaolan."

"204.10: Uí Choraighein were chieftains of Boghaid and Uí Chathasaigh from An Bheitheach and Uí Aingle from Doire Uí Aingle."

"204.11: Ó Faghartaigh king of Dealbhna of Cuil Fhabhair and Muintir Fhathaigh and Fiodh Luaraigh, Ó Domhnaill from An Ardraith (i.e., from Ath, etc., see ahead of you: from Ath Meic Cinn to Loch Oirbsean) and Uí Aodha: they were of equeal rank – carousal chiefs to Ó Flaithbheartaigh."

"204.12: The seed of Aodh of Eanach Duin belonged to the family of Ceallach s. Raghallach s. Uada, i.e., Clann Cheallaigh also. Aodh s. Eochaidh Tiormcharna s. Fearghus first granted Eanach Duin to God and to Breanainn."

== Annalistic references ==
From The Annals of the Four Masters:

- M1417.5. Rory, the son of Murrough O'Flaherty; Rory, the son of Dermot Duv O'Flaherty, and sixteen others of the O'Flahertys, were drowned in the bay of Umallia.
- M1422.5. Donnell Finn O'Flaherty was slain by the sons of Donnell O'Flaherty.
- M1442.7. O'Flaherty, i.e. Gilladuv, the son of Brian, Lord of West Connaught died.
- M1565.5. Murrough, the son of Donnell, son of Rory O'Flaherty, was drowned.

== See also ==
- Uí Fiachrach Aidhne
- Clann Fhergail
- Clann Taidg
- Delbhna Tir Dha Locha
- Trícha Máenmaige
