= John na Mointech Mac Áeda =

John na Mointech Mac Áeda, Chief of the Name, died 1582.

The Annals of Lough Ce, sub anno 1582, record that Mac Aedha of the Mointech, i.e., John, was killed by the people of the Eill. His ancestor, Ruaidhri Mac Aedha, was Lord of Clann Cosgraigh on his death in 1170. The family were of the Muintir Murchada, and closely related to the Ó Flaithbheartaigh family.

The surname is nowadays rendered Hughes, McHugh, McGagh, or more rarely, McCoy.

== See also ==
- Muireadhach mac Aedh, died 1124.
- Máelsechlain Mac Áeda, died 1267.
- Máel Sechlain Mac Áeda, Archbishop of Tuam 1312–10 August 1348.
