= Máelsechlain Mac Áeda =

Máelsechlain Mac Áeda (died 1267) was Lord of Clann Cosgraigh.

The Mac Áeda were natives of Maigh Seóla, near Tuam, in what is now County Galway. They were originally of the Muintir Murchada, and closely related to the O'Flaherty family.

The surname is nowadays rendered Hughes, McHugh, or more rarely, McCoy.

The Annals of Connacht, sub anno 1267, state:

- Maelsechlainn Mac Aeda and Conchobar his father and Aed his brother all died within three months.

== See also ==
- Ruaidhri Mac Aedha, Lord of Clan Cosgraigh, died 1170
- Máel Sechlain Mac Áeda, Archbishop of Tuam 1312–10 August 1348.
- John na Mointech Mac Áeda, killed 1582
