= Maelcairearda =

Maelcairearda (died 993) was King of Uí Briúin Seóla.

== Biography ==
There is uncertainty over the succession between Murchad mac Flann mac Glethneachan and Brian. A Maelcairearda King of Uí Briúin, is recorded in the annals as dying in 993 but this may refer to Uí Briúin proper, or indeed its offshoots. (Early kings of Uí Briúin Seóla were often described as kings of all Uí Briúin as well.) Ruaidhri mac Coscraigh of the Clann Cosgraigh appears in the Annals of Tighernach and Inisfallen sub anno 992 as king of Uí Briúin and South Connacht, when he is killed fighting the Corcu Modruad and Uí Fiachrach Aidhne, suggesting Ruaidhri is Maelcairearda's immediate predecessor. In the O'Flaherty genealogies, Maelcairearda is given as the father of Muireadhach ua Flaithbheartach (died 1034).

A notable event took place on the crannog home of Muintir Murchada, at Lough Cimbe (now Lough Hackett) in 991:

The wind sunk the island of Loch Cimbe suddenly, with its dreach and rampart, i.e. thirty feet.

| Preceded by Ruaidhri mac Coscraigh | King of Uí Briúin Seóla; 992?–993 | Succeeded by Brian mac Maelruanaidh |
