= Máel Sechlain Mac Áeda =

Archbishop of Tuam in Ireland

Máel Sechlain Mac Áeda (alternatively Malachias Mac Aodha, anglicised Malachy McHugh) was Archbishop of Tuam from 1312 to 10 August 1348.

== Background ==
Máel Seachlainn Mac Áeda was a member of a Connacht family associated with the Kings of Connacht. They were natives of Maigh Seóla, near Tuam, and originally of the Clann Cosgraigh, which was a branch of the Uí Briúin and kin to the Muintir Murchada.

The surname is nowadays rendered McHugh, or more rarely, McCoy.

== Episcopal career ==
Mac Áeda was elected archbishop of Tuam about March 1312, but not translated from Elphin until 19 December 1312, and did not receive possession of the temporalities until 1 April 1313. Also known as Malachais Tuamensis or Malachi MacHugh, he died in 1348.

== Leabhair Mac Áeda ==
He wrote what was described by O'Reilly as "a large volume of miscellaneous matter in Irish, containing, amongst other things, a catalogue of Irish kings from Niall Naoighiallach (Niall Noígíallach) to Roderick O'Conor (Ruaidrí Ua Conchobair). Sir James Ware, in his account of Irish writers, says, it was extant in his time, and called the Book of Mac Aodha. We can not say where it is to be found at present."

== Death ==
His death does not seem to be recorded in any of the extant Irish annals. The cause of his death is unknown, but it may be related to The Black Death which was prevalent in Ireland at the time. The Annals of Connacht state that "A great plague raged in Ireland ... by which great numbers were carried off."

== Genealogy ==
- Genealach Mec Aodha/The genealogy of Mac Aodha: Donnchadh s. Maol Eachlainn, the archbishop, s. Maol Eachlainn s. Donnchadh s. Aodh s. Tadhg s. Muireadhach s. Aodh s. Ruaidhrí s. Coscrach s. Flann Abhradh s. Gamhnán s. Conaing s. Muirgheas s. Coscrach Mór s. Donn s. Cumasach s. Dúnghal s. Ceann Faoladh s. Colga s. Aodh s. Seanach s. Duach Teangumha s. Fearghus s. Muireadhach Mál (the king) s. Eóghan Sréabh s. Duach Galach s. Brian.

From Leabhar na nGenealach, 201.6, pp. 442–43, volume I.

== See also ==
- McHugh
- Crichaireacht cinedach nduchasa Muintiri Murchada
- Ruaidhri Mac Aedha, Lord of Clan Cosgraigh, died 1170
- Máelsechlain Mac Áeda, died 1270
- Denis Mac Áeda, son of Aedh Mac Áeda, Dean of Tuam, died 1339
- Paddy McHugh, Independent T.D., born 1953
- Ann Maire McHugh, 9/11 victim

Catholic Church titles
Preceded by Cathal Ó Conchobair	Bishop of Elphin; 1310-1312	Succeeded by Lúrint Ó Lachtnáin
Preceded by William de Bermingham	Archbishop of Tuam; 1312-1348	Succeeded by Tomás MacCearbhaill
