= Conmaicne Mara =

Early people of Ireland

The Conmaicne Mara (lit. 'Conmaicne of the Sea' ; Modern Irish: Conmhaicne Mara) were an early people of Ireland. Their tuath was located in the extreme west of County Galway, Ireland, giving their name to Connemara, an anglicised form of Conmhaicne Mara.

== Origin ==
The Conmaicne were a people of early Ireland, perhaps related to the Laigin, who dispersed to various parts of Ireland. They settled in Connacht and Longford, giving their name to several Conmaicne territories. Other branches of the Conmaicne located in County Galway included the Conmaicne Dúin Móir and the Conmaicne Cúile Tolad.

== Territory ==
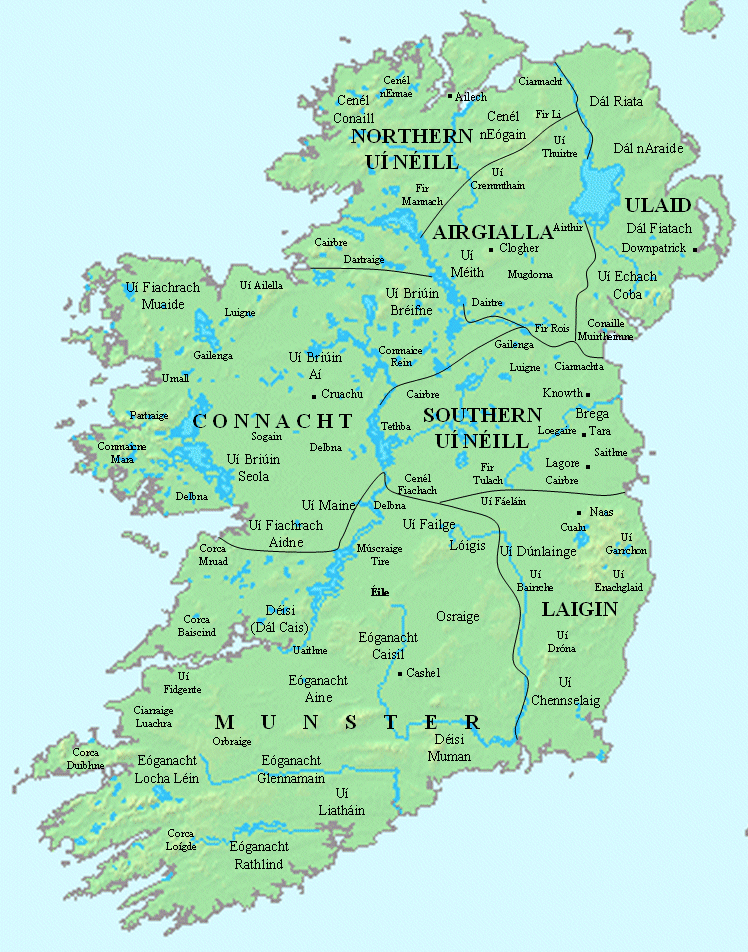
Early peoples and kingdoms of Ireland, c.800

Conmaicne Mara comprised all of the barony of Ballynahinch and the civil parish of Inishbofin, which is in the barony of Murrisk. The territory contains the five civil parishes of Ballynakill (Baile na Cille), Ballindoon, Moyrus (Maigh Iorras), Omey (Iomaidh Fheicín) and Inishbofin (Inis Bó Fine). The territory contains the five Catholic parishes of An Clochán (Clifden, Omey & Ballindoon), Iorras Ainbhtheach (Carna), Cloch na Rón (Roundstone), Baile na Cille (Ballynakill) and (Inis Bó Fine Inishbofin).

The area of County Galway in which Connemara lies is known as Iar Connacht i.e. the portion of County Galway west of Lough Corrib and a small piece of County Mayo. The parish of Kilconickny, which means "church of the Conmaicne"is located west of the town of Loughrea.

== History ==
The chiefs of the Conmaicne Mara were the O’Kealys, and their cadets were the MacConneelys, O’Devaneys, and O’Clohertys, with the O’Falons [Folan] as their hereditary brehons. The O’Kealys relocated to Ui Oirbsen, but they were to find themselves imposed upon again after just a few decades. The MacConneelys stayed in their home at Ballyconneely Peninsula, but soon found themselves neighbors of the O’Flahertys.

A court inquisition in 1607 includes the following as leading chiefs of name in the barony of Ballynahinch: O’Flaherty of Bunowen, MacConroy, MacConnor, MacDonough, O’Duan, O’Lee, and MacConneely. MacConnor and MacDonough, are chiefs of branches that separated from the O’Flahertys, while the two after that, O’Duan and O’Lee, headed old followers of that family. The MacConneelys were the eldest cadets of the O’Kealys of Conmaicne Mara.

== Annalistic references ==
See Annals of Inisfallen

- AI1016.6 The slaughter of Ára, in which Ua Lochlainn, royal heir of Corcu Modruad, was killed in Port Ciaráin in Ára. It was the Conmaicne who slew him.
- AI1016.8 Death of Muiredach son of Cadla, king of Conmaicne Mara.

== See also ==
- Uí Fiachrach Aidhne
- Clann Fhergail
- Clann Taidg
- Delbhna Tír Dhá Locha
- Muintir Murchada
- Senchineoil
- Uí Maine
- Soghain
- Trícha Máenmaige
- Uí Díarmata
- Cóiced Ol nEchmacht
- Síol Anmchadha
- Iar Connacht
- Maigh Seola
- Cenél Áeda na hEchtge

== Bibliography ==
- Medieval Ireland: Territorial, Political and Economic Divisions, Paul MacCotter, Four Courts Press, 2008. ISBN 978-1-84682-098-4
