= Ruaidhri Ua Flaithbheartaigh =

Irish provincial king, died 1145

King of Iar Connacht
- Reign: ?–1145
- Predecessor: Conchobhar Ua Flaithbheartaigh
- Successor: Áedh Ua Flaithbheartaigh?
- Died: 1145
- Dynasty: O'Flaherty dynasty

Ruaidhri Ua Flaithbheartaigh (died 1145) was King of Iar Connacht.

== Biography ==
The succession of the chiefs of Muintir Murchada after 1098 is uncertain, unless it is that Ruaidhri reigned from then until his death in 1145. However, as of 1117, Brian Ua Flaithbertaigh was Chief of the Name.

The annals simply state that "The men of Munster proceeded with an army into Connaught; and they carried off Ua Ceallaigh, i.e. Tadhg, son of Conchobhar, lord of Ui-Maine, and slew Ruaidhri Ua Flaithbheartaigh."

Preceded by Conchobhar Ua Flaithbheartaigh	King of Iar Connacht ?–1145	Succeeded by Áedh Ua Flaithbheartaigh?

== See also ==
- Ó Flaithbertaigh
