= 1043 =

1043 in various calendars
- Gregorian calendar: 1043; MXLIII
- Ab urbe condita: 1796
- Armenian calendar: 492; ԹՎ ՆՂԲ
- Assyrian calendar: 5793
- Balinese saka calendar: 964–965
- Bengali calendar: 449–450
- Berber calendar: 1993
- English Regnal year: N/A
- Buddhist calendar: 1587
- Burmese calendar: 405
- Byzantine calendar: 6551–6552
- Chinese calendar: 壬午年 (Water Horse); 3740 or 3533 — to — 癸未年 (Water Goat); 3741 or 3534
- Coptic calendar: 759–760
- Discordian calendar: 2209
- Ethiopian calendar: 1035–1036
- Hebrew calendar: 4803–4804
- Hindu calendars
- Vikram Samvat: 1099–1100
- Shaka Samvat: 964–965
- Kali Yuga: 4143–4144
- Holocene calendar: 11043
- Igbo calendar: 43–44
- Iranian calendar: 421–422
- Islamic calendar: 434–435
- Japanese calendar: Chōkyū 4 (長久４年)
- Javanese calendar: 946–947
- Julian calendar: 1043; MXLIII
- Korean calendar: 3376
- Minguo calendar: 869 before ROC 民前869年
- Nanakshahi calendar: −425
- Seleucid era: 1354/1355 AG
- Thai solar calendar: 1585–1586
- Tibetan calendar: ཆུ་ཕོ་རྟ་ལོ་ (male Water-Horse); 1169 or 788 or 16 — to — ཆུ་མོ་ལུག་ལོ་ (female Water-Sheep); 1170 or 789 or 17

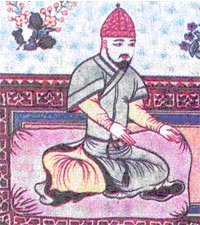
Sultan Tughril Beg (990–1063)

Year 1043 (MXLIII) was a common year starting on Saturday of the Julian calendar.

== Events ==
=== By place ===
==== Byzantine Empire ====
- Spring – Emperor Constantine IX Monomachos sends a Byzantine expeditionary force to the Balkans against the rebellious George Maniakes, governor of the Catepanate of Italy. The two armies meet near Thessaloniki in northern Greece. The rebel army – better organized, seasoned and with superior leadership – is initially successful, but Maniakes is killed by an arrow at the moment of his triumph. After this, his army is routed.
- Rus'–Byzantine War: A Kievan Rus' naval raid, led by Grand Prince Vladimir Yaraslavich, unsuccessfully attacks Constantinople. A 6,000-strong Kievan contingent under Vyshata is also defeated and deported to the capital.

==== Europe ====
- Spring – A grand assembly at Melfi, with all the Norman and Lombard nobles acclaim Guaimar IV, duke of Apulia and Calabria. The territories are divided into 12 fiefdoms and distributed among Norman chieftains. William Iron Arm is granted Ascoli as a private fiefdom and his brother Drogo of Hauteville is granted Venosa. Count Rainulf II of Aversa, not present at the assembly, receives Siponto and recognizes Guaimar's suzerainty.
- Grand Prince Yaroslav the Wise of Kiev makes an agreement with Duke Casimir I the Restorer of Poland that recognizes Chervyen as part of Kiev. The agreement is sealed with a double marriage – Casimir to Maria Dobroniega (a daughter of Vladimir the Great), and Iziaslav to Gertrude, Casimir's sister.
- September 28 – The Battle of Lyrskov Heath: Magnus the Good led an Dano-Norwegian army to victory against the Wends. The Wendish army was crushed and up to 15,000 were killed.
- November 21 – King Henry III ("the Black") marries Agnes of Poitou (daughter of William V of Aquitaine) at the Imperial Palace at Ingelheim am Rhein. She is his second wife after the death of Gunhilda from malaria in 1038.

==== England ====
- April 3 – Edward the Confessor is crowned king of England at Winchester Cathedral. He learns that his mother, Queen Emma of Normandy is plotting with Magnus the Good to take control of the English throne. Edward strips her land and treasure, but she is allowed to stay in England.

==== Arabian Empire ====
- The Seljuqs under Tughril Beg expel the Oghuz Turks from Khorasan and conquer Qazvin (modern Iran). They become the new masters of the Ziyarid dynasty (approximate date).

==== Africa ====
- The first king of the Kingdom of Nri, Eze Nri Ìfikuánim, is installed in West Africa.

==== Asia ====
- In China, the statesmen Ouyang Xiu and Fan Zhongyan put forth the Qingli Reforms during the Song dynasty, which are halted by 1045.

== Births ==
- Abu Muhammad al-Baghawi, Persian hadith scholar (d. 1122)
- Áurea of San Millán, Spanish anchorite and saint (d. 1070)
- Fulk IV ("the Quarreller"), French nobleman (d. 1109)
- Furong Daokai, Chinese Zen Buddhist monk (d. 1118)
- Isaac ben Reuben Albargeloni, Spanish Jewish rabbi
- El Cid (Rodrigo Diaz de Vivar), Spanish nobleman (d. 1099)

== Deaths ==
- February 14 – Gisela of Swabia, Holy Roman Empress (b. 990)
- February 20 – Alexios Stoudites, patriarch of Constantinople
- June 26 – Gonzalo Sánchez, Spanish nobleman (b. 1020)
- July 26 – Moses the Hungarian, Kievan Russian monk
- Al-Muqtana Baha'uddin, Druze religious leader (b. 979)
- Cathal mac Ruaidhri, king of Maigh Seóla (Ireland)
- George Maniakes, Byzantine general and governor
- Hallvard Vebjørnsson, Norwegian patron saint
- Hywel ab Owain, king of Glywysing (Wales)
