= Teige Ó Flaithbheartaigh =

Teige Ó Flaithbheartaigh (died 1589) was an Irish rebel and warlord.

== Background ==
Teige Ó Flaithbheartaigh was a son, and principal captain of, Murrough na dTuadh Ó Flaithbheartaigh, head of the Eastern Uí Flaithbheartaigh, who had been appointed Chief of Iar Connacht by Elizabeth I. This was contentious as the Western Uí Flaithbheartaigh refused to recognise he had a claim to the office, let alone should have been appointed by an outsider. However, with the support of his family and supporters, Murrough, gained supremacy though relations between the two branches remained tense.

During the Mac an Iarla wars (c.1547–1583), County Galway was reduced to an extremely disturbed state, with much of the county east of Lough Corrib been repeatedly devastated. While the Eastern Uí Flaithbheartaigh's, ruled by Murrough, generally had more cordial relationships with The Tribes of Galway, the situation was used to advantage when possible. However, disturbances never fully died out.

== Feuds and raids ==
In 1584, Teige was residing on the island of Ballynahinch, County Galway when it was raided and seized by the descendants of Owen Ó Flaithbheartaigh (namely, Teige, the son of Teige na-Buile ... and the sons of Donnell-an-Chogaidh), claiming that:

that island was their's by right, and that Teige had seized and held it in violation of their right. Be the truth as t might, Teige, after their capture of it, made an irruption upon them, and left not a single head of cattle on their portion of the territory which he did not either kill or carry off with him. They, in return, committed great injuries against Teige, although they had not equal power with him.

In June, Teige pursued the descendants of Owen,

with the crew of a boat to the island of Aran ... he overtook them at the break of day, and found them unprepared, in a state between waking and sleeping, at both sides of the forecastle of their boat. He set them a very hostile example on this strand; and indeed the island was not worth all that was done about it on that day, for Murrough Mac Hugh ... the son of the Seneschal of Clann-Maurice, ... and Murrough Salach, the son of O'Flaherty (Teige), were slain. Many of the descendants of Owen O'Flaherty were also slain, besides these gentlemen. Thus did they remain at war with each other, until they were mutually reconciled by the English in the ensuing autumn, when the island of Baile-na-hinnsi was given to the descendants of Owen O'Flaherty.

== The War of 1589 ==
Warfare erupted again in the spring of 1589, this time with Murrough na dTuadh leading the clan and its allies against the Anglo-Irish and their allies. Accompanying him was Teige and another son, Urun, and their first cousin, Donnell mac Rory Ó Flaithbheartaigh. Once again, William Óge Martyn went forth to meet with Murrough, leading a military company. However, by the time he and Murrough met, Teige and his companions had already left, went upon a predatory excursion along the borders of Conmaicne and Machaire-Riabhach, precisely on Easter night.

The places mentioned were along the borders of County Mayo – County Galway, in the lordship of Baron Athenry, the then lord been Edmond I de Bermingham (1540–1612). His account of the events is as follows:

Teig O'Flaherty accompanied by three of his brothers and 500 more came to the borders where I dwell and there did prey and burn sixteen towns. The said Teig accompanied by a hundred more came to my town, (Milltown, County Galway), and there did assault my castle. I being well provided did put them from that purpose. I did kill two of his gentleman and had four of his men hurt and buried. He burned half of my town and all my corn and carried my prey with him. Two bands of soldiers being six miles east of me (Dunmore, County Galway) I did send unto them desiring they mgith make with my guide I having the enemy in sight until we met the soldiers brought them face to face at the gate of Carras in the barony of Kilmaine ... there was a volley of shots from each side ... they came to the push of the pike with great courage until Teig O'Flaherty was slain with eight of his company ... divers others were killed in their flight ...

Remarkably, an account from a Gaelic perspective survives, in the Annals of the Four Masters:

It was at this time that two sons of Murrough of the Battle-axes O'Flaherty, Teige and Urun, and the son of Murrough's brother, i.e. Donnell, the son of Rory O'Flaherty, went upon a predatory excursion along the borders of Conmaicne and Machaire-Riabhach, precisely on Easter night. They had two or three hundred horse-boys on this excursion. They proceeded to take much booty and spoils throughout the country early in the morning of Easter Sunday. The people of the country came from every quarter in pursuit of them.

Unknown to Teige,

On the night before a company or two of soldiers had come, privately and unperceived, to protect the country; and these, upon hearing the loud report of the ordnance, and the clamour of the armed troops on the following day, retired to a narrow pass, which could not be easily shunned or avoided, and there lay in ambush for the Irish host. They saw Teige O'Flaherty approaching in front of the host, and his people in close ranks about him. The soldiers discharged showers of balls at the van of the Irish host, and slew by this volley Teige O'Flaherty, Urun O'Flaherty, and Teige Oge, the son of Teige O'Flaherty, together with a great number of their followers who were about them, of the chiefs of Joyce's country, and the Clann-Donough. Such of the Irish host as were not killed by the first volley went away without panic or fear, and were not further pursued.'

== Aftermath ==
Three days after the killing of Teige, Edmond, another son of Murrough was hung in prison in Galway. The annalist further commented that "were it not that these sons of Murrough of the Battle-axes O'Flaherty fell in the act of plunder and insurrection against the Sovereign of England, their death after this manner would have been a great cause of lamentation."

Teige was survived by at least one child, Brian na Samthach Ó Flaithbheartaigh, who later gained notoriety of his own.

His home at Ballynahinch, County Galway was later home to descendants of his sometime-antagonist, William Óge Martyn, such as Richard Martin (died 1834), Thomas Barnwall Martin (died 1847) and Mary Letitia Martin (died 1850).

== See also ==
- Maigh Seóla
- Iar Connacht
- Murchadh an Chapail Ua Flaithbheartaigh, first Chief of the Name
- Toombeola
