= Áedh Ua Flaithbheartaigh =

Irish provincial king, died 1178

Áedh Ua Flaithbheartaigh (died 1178) was King of Iar Connacht.

== Biography ==
The annals record that Áedh died at Annaghdown, demonstrating that the Muintir Murchada still held some influence east of Lough Corrib into the late 12th century.

In 1185, the annals state "The West of Connaught was burned, as well churches and houses, by Donnell O'Brien and the English." In 1196, "Cathal, the son of Hugh O'Flaherty, was slain by the son of Murtough Midheach."

Áedh appears to have been succeeded by his son, Ruaidhri.

Preceded by Ruaidhri Ua Flaithbheartaigh	King of Iar Connacht; 1145?–1178	Succeeded by Conchubhar Ua Flaithbheartaigh

== See also ==
- Ó Flaithbertaigh
