= Rudhraighe Ó Flaithbheartaigh =

Irish regional king

Rudhraighe Ó Flaithbheartaigh (fl. 1214) was King of Iar Connacht.

== Annalistic references ==
- M1207.6. Cathal Crovderg O'Conor, King of Connaught, expelled Hugh O'Flaherty, and gave his territory to his own son, Hugh O'Conor.
- M1214. Brian, the son of Rory O'Flaherty, the son of the Lord of West Connaught, died.

Preceded by Murtough Ua Flaithbertaigh	King of Iar Connacht; 1204?–after 1214	Succeeded by Áedh Mór Ó Flaithbheartaigh

== See also ==
- Ó Flaithbertaigh
