= McHugh =

McHugh is a common surname of Irish origin. It is an anglicisation of the original Irish Mac Aodha, meaning literally "Son of Aodh". Aodh was a popular male given name in mediaeval Gaelic Ireland. It was traditionally written in English-language documents as Hugh, an unrelated name of Frankish origin.

The first bearers of the surname were the grandsons of Aodh (died 1033), who was son of Ruaidhrí mac Coscraigh, King of South Connacht. The surname's pronunciation in Irish has also given rise to the spelling McGagh (otherwise McGah or McGarr), forms of the surname which are geographically concentrated around the area of Belclare parish in County Galway, the centre of the Clann Cosgraigh territory ruled by the historical McHughs. Other anglicised versions of the surname include Hughes and Hewson.

Notable people bearing this surname include:

- Bob McHugh (musician), American pianist and composer
- Bob McHugh (footballer) (born 1991), Scottish footballer
- Brendan McHugh (born 1990), American swimmer
- Charles McHugh (actor) (1870–1931), American actor
- Chris McHugh (born 1964), American drummer of Christian rock band White Heart
- Collin McHugh (born 1987), American baseball player
- Ed McHugh (1930–2016), American soccer player
- Edward McHugh (trade unionist) (1853–1915), Irish Georgist (land reformer), trade unionist, Labour activist and social reformer
- Edward McHugh (politician) (1846–1900), Irish nationalist politician, an anti-Parnellite Member of Parliament for South Armagh, 1892–1900
- Edward McHugh (artist) (born 1969), Philadelphia artist
- Edwin McHugh (1915–2004), American politician from Nebraska
- Eoin McHugh (born 1994/5), Irish Gaelic footballer
- Francis McHugh (1925–2018), Yorkshire-born Gloucestershire cricketer with the lowest batting average of any regular first-class player
- Frank McHugh (1898–1981), American film and television actor
- Frazer McHugh (born 1981), English footballer
- Gerry McHugh (born 1957), nationalist politician in Northern Ireland
- Godfrey McHugh (1911–1997), US Air Force general and aide to President John F. Kennedy
- Heather McHugh (born 1948), American poet
- James M. McHugh (1899–1966), United States Marine Corps officer
- James T. McHugh (1932–2000), third bishop of the Roman Catholic Diocese of Rockville Centre
- Jason McHugh (born 1968), American television producer and actor
- Jeannette McHugh (born 1934), Australian politician
- Jimmy McHugh (1894–1969), American composer
- Joe McHugh (born 1971), Irish Fine Gael politician
- John M. McHugh (born 1948), Irish-American politician
- John McHugh (tenor) (1912–2004), British opera singer
- Kevin McHugh (born 1980), Irish footballer
- Kitty McHugh (1902–1954), American actress
- Lia McHugh (born 2005), American actress
- Malachy McHugh (died 1348), canon and Bishop of Elphin and Archbishop of Tuam (1313–1348)
- Mark McHugh (born 1990), Irish Gaelic footballer
- Matt McHugh (1894–1971), American actor
- Matthew F. McHugh (born 1938), politician and US Congressman
- Maureen F. McHugh (born 1959), American science fiction and fantasy writer
- Michael McHugh (born 1935), justice of the High Court of Australia
- Mike McHugh (born 1965), National Hockey League left wing
- Paddy McHugh (born 1953), Irish independent politician
- Paul McHugh (legal scholar) (born 1958), New Zealand academic lawyer
- Paul R. McHugh (born 1931), Massachusetts psychiatrist, educator, author
- Ryan McHugh (born 1994), Irish Gaelic footballer
- Sean McHugh (born 1982), American football tight end
- Siobhán McHugh, Irish-Australian author, podcaster and documentary filmmaker
- Terry McHugh (born 1963), Irish javelin thrower
- Thomas J. McHugh (1919–2000), recipient of the Purple Heart medal

Fictional characters with this surname include:

- Benji McHugh, in the UK soap opera Family Affairs
- Nathan McHugh, in the American television series Flight 29 Down

== See also ==
- MacHugh
- McHugh Forum, an ice hockey stadium
- McHugo
