= Sans titre =

Sans titre is French for untitled. It may refer to:

- Sans titre (album), a 2009 album by Corneille
- Sans titre, an 1838 book by Xavier Forneret
- Sans Titre, a 1997 short film by Leos Carax
- Sans titre, work by Albert Féraud
- Sans titre, a 1999 exhibition by Edward McHugh
