= Aedh Ua Flaithbheartaigh =

Aedh Ua Flaithbheartaigh (died 1079) was King of Iar Connacht.

== Biography ==
Aedh was the third bearer of the surname Ua Flaithbheartaigh to rule over the Muintir Murchada, and apparently the second since their forcible expulsion from Maigh Seola by the Ua Conchobhair in 1051. He was killed in 1079 by Ruaidrí na Saide Buide. For this action, King Toirdelbach Ua Briain of Munster raided Connacht and expelled Ruaidrí.

A notice of the death of his grandson in 1091 says Aedh's father was Ruaidhri Ua Flaithbheartaigh, who had been killed in the battle of Glen Patrick in 1061.

Preceded by Rúaidhri Ua Flaithbheartaigh	King of Iar Connacht; 1061–1079	Succeeded by Mac meic Aedh Ua Flaithbheartaigh

== See also ==
- Ó Flaithbertaigh
