= Clann Fhearghaile =

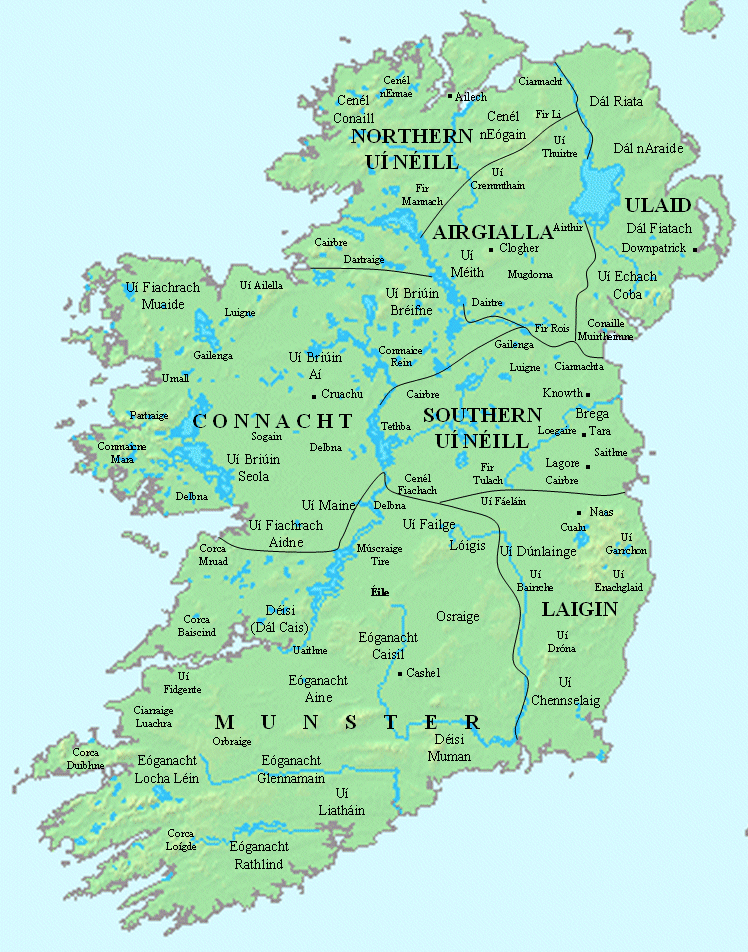
Early peoples and kingdoms of Ireland, c.800

Clann Fhergail was a cantred located in County Galway, comprising the baronies of Moycullen and Galway, and the parishes of Oranmore and Ballynacourty and Rahoon.

Crichaireacht cinedach nduchasa Muintiri Murchada is a tract dating since the reign of its overlord, Flaithbertaigh Ua Flaithbertaigh who died 1098 (he was the King of Connacht from 1092-1098). This list contains the main families of the region and their estates within Clann Fhergail. The first listed was the family of Halloran.

== See also ==
- Uí Fiachrach Aidhne
- Clann Taidg
- Conmaicne Mara
- Delbhna Tir Dha Locha
- Muintir Murchada
- Senchineoil
- Uí Maine
- Soghain
- Trícha Máenmaige
- Uí Díarmata
- Cóiced Ol nEchmacht
- Síol Anmchadha
- Iar Connacht
- Maigh Seola
- Cenél Áeda na hEchtge
- Cenél Guaire
- Muintir Máelfináin
- Conmaicne Cenéoil Dubáin
- Conmaicne Cuile Tolad
- Bunrath
- Uí Briúin Rátha
- Tír Maine
- Uí Briúin Seola
- Machaire Riabhach
- Maigh Mucruimhe
- Airthir Connacht
- Meadraige
- Corca Moga
- Óic Bethra
