= Edward McHugh =

Edward McHugh may refer to:

- Edward McHugh (trade unionist) (1853–1915), Irish Georgist (land reformer), trade unionist, Labour activist and social reformer
- Edward McHugh (politician) (1846–1900), Irish nationalist politician, an Anti-Parnellite Member of Parliament for South Armagh, 1892–1900
- Edward McHugh (artist) (born 1969), Philadelphia artist
- Ed McHugh (born 1930), American soccer player
