= Brian Ua Flaithbertaigh =

Brian Ua Flaithbertaigh, a Chief if the Name and possibly King of Iar Connacht, alive 1117.

== Biography ==
The succession of the chiefs of Muintir Murchada after 1098 is uncertain. It seems that as of 1117, Brian was Chief of the Name. In that year, the annals state that

The battle of Leacain was given by Briain, son of Murchadh Ua Flaithbheartaigh, and the son of Cathal Ua Conchobhair, who had the Connaughtmen along with them, to Toirdhealbhach, son of Diarmaid, and the Dal-gCais, and made a slaughter of them in that battle.

Nowhere is it stated that Brian was King, nor is his obituary given in the years ahead. It may be that he was no more than a successful prince of the clan.

Preceded by Flaithbertaigh Ua Flaithbertaigh	King of Iar Connacht ?–?	Succeeded by Muireadhach Ua Flaithbheartaigh

== See also ==
- Ó Flaithbertaigh
