= Conchubhar Ua Flaithbheartaigh =

Conchubhar Ua Flaithbertaigh, King of Iar Connacht, died 1186.

== Biography ==
The Annals of Ulster, sub anno 1186, record that "Conchubhar Ua Flaithbertaigh was killed by Ruaidhri Ua Flaithbertaigh, by his own brother, in Ara."

Preceded by Áedh Ua Flaithbheartaigh	King of Iar Connacht; 1178?–1186	Succeeded by Ruadhri Ua Flaithbertaigh

== See also ==
- Ó Flaithbertaigh
