= Morogh Ó Flaithbheartaigh =

Morogh Ó Flaithbheartaigh (fl. 1244) was King of Iar Connacht and Chief of the Name.

== Biography ==
Morogh was the first chief of the clan after their final expulsion from Uí Briúin Seóla. King Áed in Gai Bernaig of Connacht had begun their subjugation in 1051, but it was only with the encastallation of Muintir Murchada under Richard Mor de Burgh that the family were finally driven to the west side of Lough Corrib. The rest of their history as an independent people would be as rulers of Iar Connacht, or as it is now known, Connemara.

Moroghand and his brother, Ruaidhri, his brother may have accompanied Felim mac Cathal Crobderg Ua Conchobair (reigned 1233–1256), on an expedition to Wales in 1245 under Henry III. This would have been on Henry III's campaign against Prince Dafydd ap Llywelyn of Gwynedd.

It is not known when Morogh died, so it is not certain if an annals entry of 1248 refers to him. It states: "The entire of Conmaicne Mara was plundered by the English. The English went upon an expedition against O'Flaherty, who defeated them, and killed numbers of them." In 1256 Ruaidhri is listed as the Ó Flaithbheartaigh.

Preceded by Áedh Mór Ó Flaithbheartaigh	King of Iar Connacht; 1244	Succeeded by Ruaidhri Ó Flaithbheartaigh

== See also ==
- Ó Flaithbertaigh
