= Iar Connacht =

Kingdom of Gaelic Ireland

West Connacht Iar Connacht
- 1051–1589
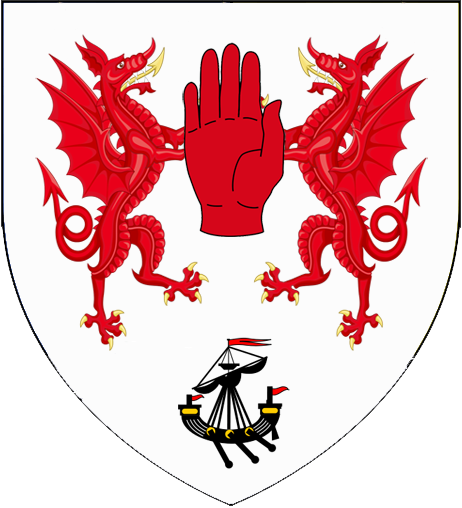
- Coat of arms

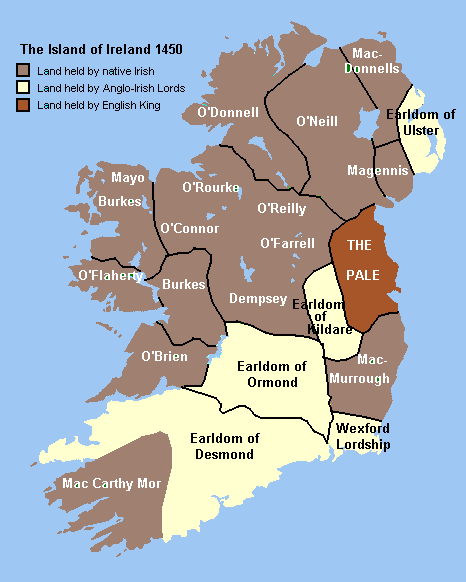
- Iar Connacht c. 1450, marked on the map as O'Flaherty.
- Status: Túatha of Connacht (until 1235)
- Common languages: Middle Irish, Early Modern Irish, Latin
- Religion: Catholic Christianity; Gaelic tradition
- Government: Tanistry
- Rí
  - 1051: Amhalgaidh mac Cathal
  - 1560–1589: Murchadh na dTuadh Ó Flaithbheartaigh
- History
  - Established: 1051
  - Disestablished: 1589
- ISO 3166 code: IE
Preceded by
Maigh Seóla
Delbhna Tír Dhá Locha
Conmhaicne Mara
Succeeded by
Connacht
Clanricarde
Kingdom of Ireland
- Today part of: Ireland

West Connacht (Irish: Iarthar Chonnachta; Modern Irish: Iar Connacht) was a kingdom of Gaelic Ireland, associated geographically with present-day County Galway, particularly the area known more commonly today as Connemara. The kingdom represented the core homeland of the Connachta's Uí Briúin Seóla kindred and although they ruled, there were smaller groups of other Gaels in the area, such as the Delbhna Tir Dha Locha and the Conmhaicne Mara. It existed from 1051 onwards, after the Ó Conchobhair, Kings of Connacht, pushed the Ó Flaithbheartaigh to the West of Lough Corrib, from their original territory of Maigh Seóla. Iar Connacht remained a subordinate túath of Connacht, until the 13th century, after which it was more independent.

Galway upon its founding was originally governed by the Ó Flaithbheartaigh of Iar Connacht, but with the rise of the Clanricarde Burkes, a Norman family, it was captured in 1232. Around this time much of Connacht, in general, fell to the Burkes. Galway's Norman oligarchy later achieved a quasi-independent status to carry out its trade, but there always lingered the threat of it being reconquered by the Gaelic Ó Flaithbheartaigh, particularly during the 14th and 15th centuries. The Normans placed a sign on the gate of the city saying, "From the Ferocious O'Flahertys, O Lord deliver us".

== History ==
=== Coastal túath of Connacht ===
Iar Connacht (West Connacht) came into being during the 1050s, under the kingship of Amhalgaidh mac Cathal, from the Ó Flaithbheartaigh. This clan had originated as part of the Connachta, specifically the Uí Briúin Seóla kindred and were also known as the Muintir Murchada, claiming descent from Murchadh mac Maenach. They were kings of Maigh Seóla from the 9th century onward, the plain lying on the eastern side of Lough Corrib (Tuam to Athenry to Maree) and owed fealty to the kings of Connacht. Maigh Seóla was a rich and fertile land and during the kingship of Áed in Gai Bernaig there was a conflict over it, between the kings of Connacht and the Muintir Murchada. The Ó Conchobhair got the better of the conflict and the subsequent descendants of Amhalgaidh mac Cathal gradually began relocating west of Lough Corrib into Iar Connacht (what is today more commonly known as Connemara).

Prior to the aforementioned events, the lands to the West of Lough Corrib were under the Delbhna Tir Dha Locha and the Conmhaicne Mara; these two groups were distinct from the Connachta in general. The Delbhna were under the Mac Con Raoi and the Conmhaicne Mara were under the Ó Cadhla. These people subsequently were subordinated to the new Iar Connacht under the Ó Flaithbheartaigh. The túatha, although part of Connacht continued to come into conflict with the Kings of Connacht at times, for instance Aedh Ua Flaithbheartaigh being killed in 1079 by Ruaidrí na Saide Buide. Ruaidrí himself was the foster-son of Flaithbertaigh Ua Flaithbertaigh and in a political coup, Flaithbertaigh became king of Connacht for 1092–1095, having blinded Ruaidrí. Flaithbertaigh was himself overthrown and later killed by members of Ruaidrí's Ó Conchobhair family.

With the rise of political forces in Munster to the south; namely the Mac Cárthaigh of the Eóganachta and the Ó Briain of the Dál gCais in Thomond, tensions between the Ó Conchobhair and the Ó Flaithbheartaigh cooled somewhat. Iar Connacht suffered several significant invasions from Munster during this time, including during the reign of Conchobhar Ua Flaithbheartaigh who was the first Governor of Dun Gallimhe (Galway) and died there in 1132 defending the fort from Cormac Mac Carthaigh. His successor, Ruaidhri Ua Flaithbheartaigh, too, was killed in 1145 after an invasion from Munster. Towards the end of the 12th century, a quarrel in Iar Connacht between two brothers of the Ó Flaithbheartaigh emerged; Conchubhar Ua Flaithbheartaigh (loyal to the Ó Conchobhair) was killed by his brother Ruadhri Ua Flaithbertaigh (who was allied to the Ó Briain). Cathal Crobhdearg arrested this Ruadhrí in 1197.

=== Relationships with the Normans ===
The aftermath of the above-mentioned brotherly dispute would have unforeseen consequences for the Gaels of Connacht. The Normans up until this point did not have much success in Connacht, but in his dispute with his brother, Cathal Carragh Ua Conchobair, the king of Connacht Cathal Crobhdearg Ua Conchobair sought the assistance of Mac Cárthaigh from Desmond and also William de Burgh, a Norman in Ireland originally from Burgh Castle, Norfolk. This was initially a success as Cathal Carragh was killed on the Curlew Mountains in battle during 1202. However, while staying at Cong, the ambitious Norman wanted a heavy payment for his services and frustrated, entered into a pact of conspiracy with the sons of Ruadhri Ua Flaithbertaigh to kill Cathal Crobhdearg. This plot was thwarted, however, but it marked the origins of the Burke vs. Connacht conflict in the coming years.

In 1315, the Joyce family settled in a part of Iar Connacht. They were ultimately of Norman origin and Thomas de Jorse arrived in Ireland via Wales as a follower of the FitzGerald family. Initially, they married into the Ó Briain family of neighbouring Thomond but Thomas' eldest son Edmond "MacMara" Joyce married a daughter of the King of Iar Connacht. Some members of this family became Gaelicised and the area of Iar Connacht they inhabited became Dúiche Sheoighe.

== Legacy ==
Although technically brought under the aegis of the British Empire's Kingdom of Ireland toward the end of the 16th century, the indigenous Gaelic culture and language of Iar Connacht would continue on for a long time after. As late as 1759, Edward Willes, the Chief Baron of the Irish Exchequer, was quoted as saying of the area that it was still, "inhabited by the ancient Irish, who never yet have been made amenable to the laws. No sheriff dares go there to execute any process."

Since the middle of the 19th century, most of Iar Chonnachta has been generally called Connemara largely due to the emerging tourist industry of that time. To this day, Connemara is geographically the biggest Gaeltacht in Ireland, where the Irish language continues to be used as a community language.

== Diocese of Annaghdown ==
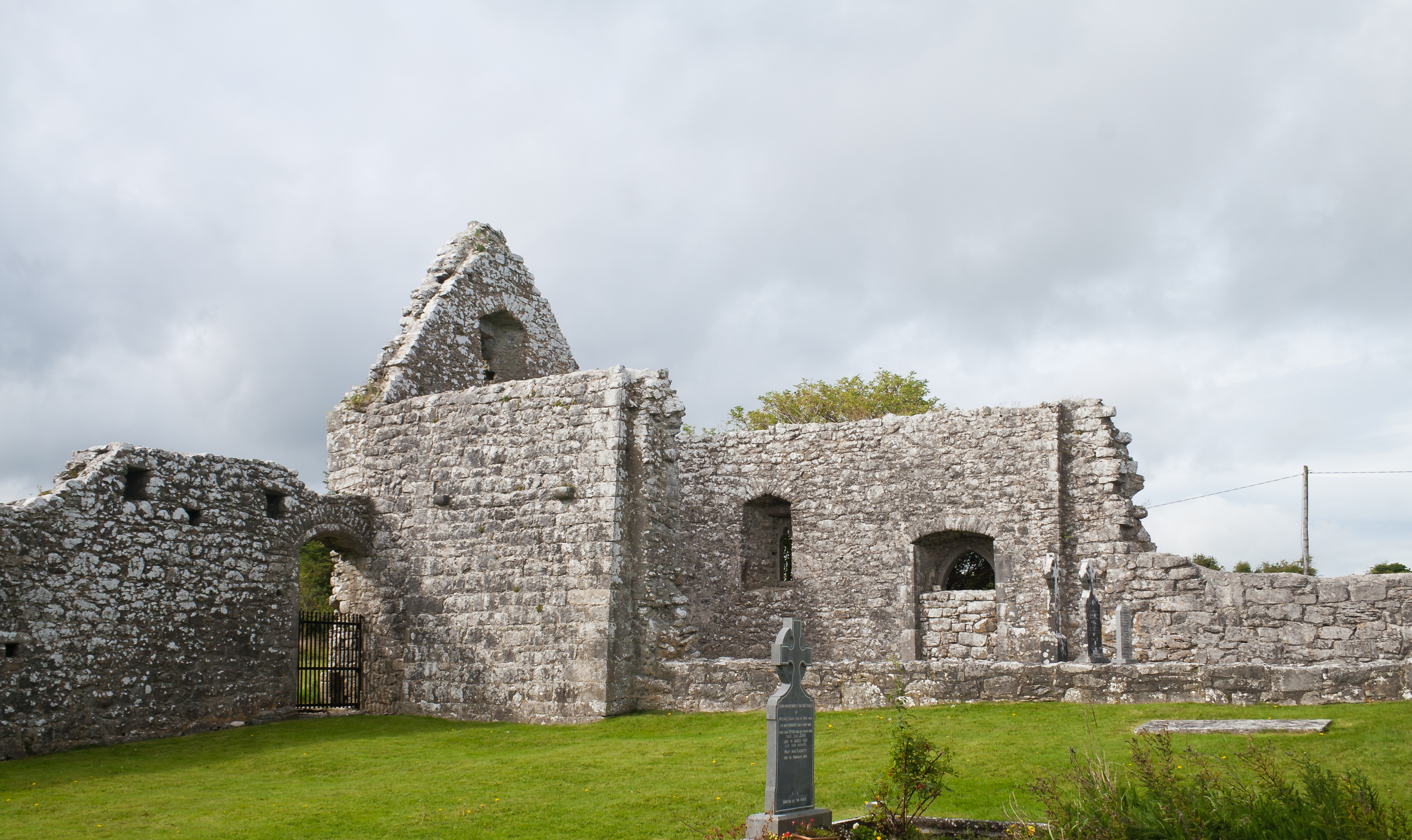
The ruins of Annaghdown Abbey, the religious centre of Iar Connacht.

The religion which predominated at an official level in Iar Connacht was Catholic Christianity. The territory of Iar Connacht was associated with the Diocese of Annaghdown under the Bishop of Annaghdown, which had been formed in 1179. It was not mentioned at the Synod of Ráth Breasail of almost seventy years earlier, where the short-lived and firmly Ó Conchobhair influenced Diocese of Cong, based on the Augustinian Cong Abbey was mentioned instead (famously associated with the Cross of Cong).

== List of kings ==
=== Kings of Maigh Seóla (later Uí Briúin Seóla) ===
- Donn mac Cumasgach, died 752
- Maelan mac Cathmogha, died 848
- Murchadh mac Maenach, died 891
- Urchadh mac Murchadh, died 943
- Donnchadh mac Urchadh, died 959
- Brian mac Maelruanaidh, died 959
- Muireadhach ua Flaithbheartach, died 1034
- Murchadh an Chapail Ua Flaithbheartaigh, died 1036
- Cathal mac Ruaidhri, died 1043
- Amhalgaidh mac Cathal, blinded 1051 (died 1075)

=== Kings of Iar Connacht ===
- Cathal mac Tigernán, died 1059
- Rúaidhri Ua Flaithbheartaigh, died 1061
- Aedh Ua Flaithbheartaigh, died 1079
- Mac meic Aedh Ua Flaithbheartaigh, died 1091
- Flaithbertaigh Ua Flaithbertaigh, died 1098
- Brian Ua Flaithbertaigh, died 1117
- Muireadhach Ua Flaithbheartaigh, died 1121
- Conchobhar Ua Flaithbheartaigh, died 1132
- Ruaidhri Ua Flaithbheartaigh, died 1145
- Áedh Ua Flaithbheartaigh, died 1178
- Conchubhar Ua Flaithbheartaigh, died 1186
- Ruadhri Ua Flaithbertaigh, alive 1197
- Murtough Ua Flaithbertaigh, died 1204
- Rudhraighe Ó Flaithbheartaigh, fl. 1214 (Brian, the son of Rory O'Flaherty, the son of the Lord of West Connaught, died.)
- Áedh Mór Ó Flaithbheartaigh, died 1236
- Morogh Ó Flaithbheartaigh, fl. 1244
- Ruaidhri Ó Flaithbheartaigh, fl. 1256–1273

=== Taoiseach of Iar Connacht ===
- Brian Ó Flaithbheartaigh, died 1377.
- Áedh Ó Flaithbheartaigh, c. 1377–1407; built the church at Annaghdown
- Domnell mac Áedh Ó Flaithbheartaigh – 1410. Donnell, the son of Hugh O'Flaherty, Lord of West Connaught, was slain by the sons of Brian O'Flaherty, at a meeting of his own people.
- 1417. Rory, the son of Murrough O'Flaherty; Rory, the son of Dermot Duv O'Flaherty, and sixteen others of the O'Flahertys, were drowned in the bay of Umallia.
- Murchad mac Brian Ó Flaithbheartaigh – 1419. Murchad son of Brian O Flaithbertaig, king of West Connacht, died this year.
- 1422. Donnell Finn O'Flaherty was slain by the sons of Donnell O'Flaherty.
- 1439. Owen O'Flaherty was treacherously slain in his own bed at night, by a farmer of his own people.
- Gilla Dubh Ó Flaithbheartaigh – 1442. O'Flaherty, i.e. Gilladuv, the son of Brian, Lord of West Connaught died.
- 1503. Teige Boirneach, Murrough and Mahon, two sons of Mahon O'Brien; Conor, the son of Brian, son of Murtough, son of Brian Roe; the son of O'Loughlin, i.e. Conor. the son of Rory, son of Ana; and Murtough, the son of Turlough, son of Murrough, son of Teige; went with Owen, the son of O'Flaherty, into West Connaught, with numerous forces, the same Owen having drawn them thither against his kinsmen (Rory Oge and Donnell of the Boat, two sons of O'Flaherty), who were encamped at Cael-shaile-ruadh, awaiting them. The O'Briens and Owen attacked the camp, and carried away preys and spoils. The sons of O'Flaherty and the people of the country followed in pursuit of them so that a battle was fought between them, in which the sons of Mahon O'Brien and Owen O'Flaherty were slain by the O'Flahertys.
- Áodh Ó Flaithbheartaigh, fl. 1538
- M1542.15. The crew of a longship came from West Connaught to Tirconnell, to plunder and prey. The place which they put in at was Reachrainn-Muintire-Birn, in Tir-Boghaine. When Turlough, the son of Mac Sweeny of Tir-Boghaine, received intelligence of this, he made an attack upon them, so that none of them escaped to tell the tale of what had happened, except their chief and captain, namely, the son of O'Flaherty, to whom Mac Sweeny granted pardon and protection; and he sent him home safe, outside his protection, to Conmaicne-mara.

== See also ==
- Clann Fhergail
- Uí Fiachrach Aidhne
- Clann Taidg
- Conmhaicne Mara
- Delbhna Tír Dhá Locha
- Muintir Murchada
- Uí Maine
- Soghain
- Máenmag
- Síol Anmchadha
- Maigh Seola
