= Domnell mac Áedh Ó Flaithbheartaigh =

Domnell mac Áedh Ó Flaithbheartaigh, leader of Iar Connacht and Chief of the Name, died 1410.

== Reign ==
Domnell was a son of Áedh Ó Flaithbheartaigh, who built the church at Annaghdown in 1410, but of whom few other particulars appear to be known.

== Annalistic reference ==
- 1410. Donnell, the son of Hugh O'Flaherty, Lord of West Connaught, was slain by the sons of Brian O'Flaherty, at a meeting of his own people.

Preceded by Áedh Ó Flaithbheartaigh	Taoiseach of Iar Connacht; 1407?–1410	Succeeded by Murchad mac Brian Ó Flaithbheartaigh

== See also ==
- Ó Flaithbertaigh
