= Aughnanure Castle =

Late 15th century tower house in Ireland

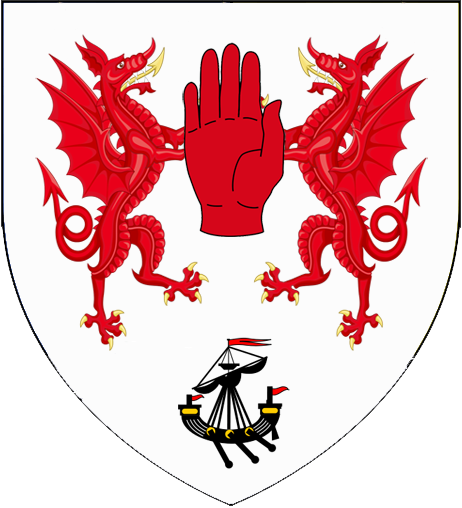
Aughnanure Castle
- Caisleán Achadh na nlubhar
- County Galway, Connacht; Near Oughterard in Ireland
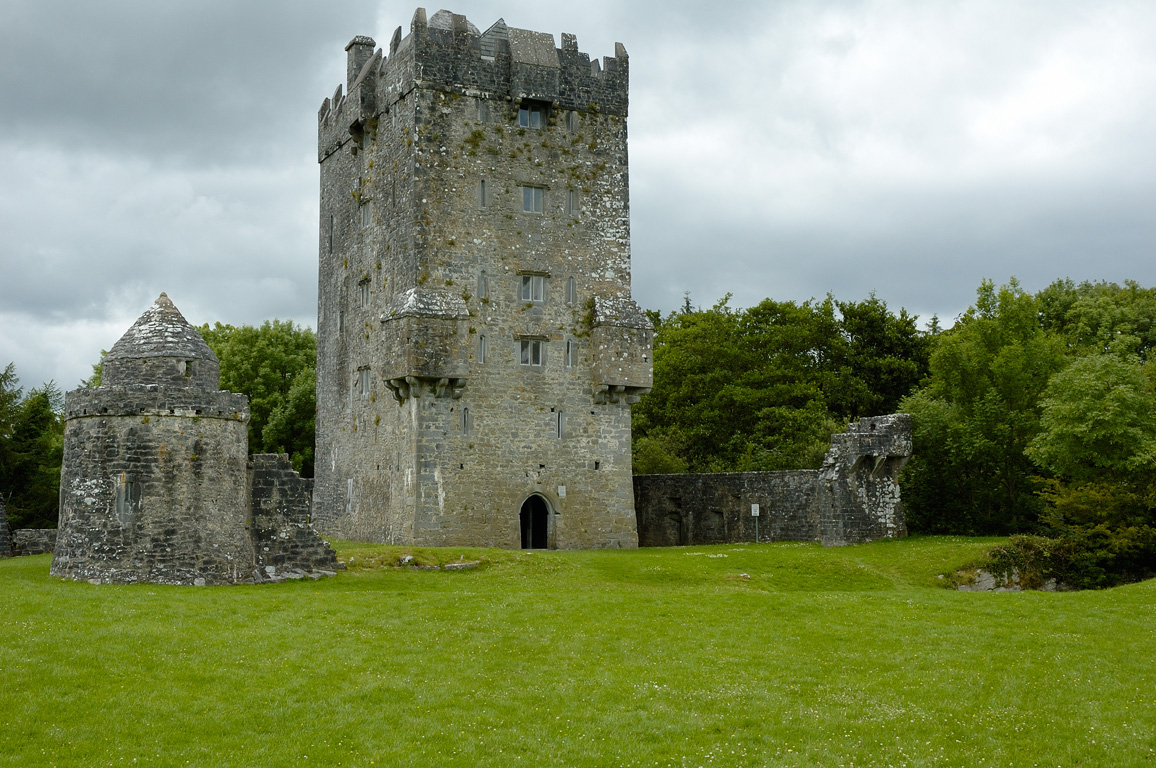

Site information
- Type: Tower house
- Owner: NMS
- Open to the public: Yes
- Condition: Fully restored
- Website: https://heritageireland.ie/visit/places-to-visit/aughnanure-castle/

Location
- Location in Ireland
- Coordinates: 53°25′04″N 9°16′16″W

Site history
- Built: Late 15th Century
- Built by: O'Flaherty
- In use: 17th Century
- Fate: Fell to ruin
- Battles/wars: Siege of Galway

National monument of Ireland
- Official name: Aughanure Castle
- Reference no.: 470

Aughnanure Castle is a tower house near Oughterard on the N59, in County Galway, in the west of Ireland. It was built by the O'Flaherty family in the late 15th century and fully restored in the 1960s. Today it is open to visitors from March to November.

== History ==
The castle was built by one of Connacht's most notable Gaelic lordly families the Ó Flaithbheartaigh clan (the name later anglicised to O'Flaherty). Aughnanure is one of over 200 tower houses in County Galway, constructed mainly by Gaelic and Anglo-Norman land-owning families. Most of them now lie in ruins. The tower is situated close to the shores of Lough Corrib, and the name translates from the Gaeilge/Irish "Caisleán Achadh na nlubhar" as "Castle of the field of the yews"; and there was once an extensive yew forest stretching from the site half-way to Galway.

Today it is the only intact medieval castle in Connemara that is open to the public. The site comprises the six-storey tower house itself, with crenellations, machicolations, bartizans, and carved water-spouts; an unusual double bawn enclosure with a unique round watchtower, docks, and a ruined banqueting hall featuring beautiful relief carvings depicting grapes and vines.

The castle site was controlled by the O'Flaherty chieftains from around 1250 and the tower house built around 1490. By this time the O'Flahertys controlled most of Iar Connacht, a territory comprising some 250,000 acres and affording extensive access to the Atlantic seaboard, and trade with Europe.

In 1572 it was captured by Sir Edward Fitton, President of Connaught, and granted to Murrough na dTuadh Ó Flaithbheartaigh (Murrough of the Battleaxes), a junior member of the family who accepted the legal formalities of recognizing the Crown, thereby dividing and weakening the clan's power and territories. They subsequently lost control of the castle, but regained it briefly 'by stealth' in the rebellion of 1641.

Aughnanure kept Galway supplied during the Cromwellian siege of 1652; when the castle was controlled by the Earl of Clanrickard, and abandoned when the city surrendered. It was later bought back by the O'Flahertys, but defaulted into the hands of Lord St George as the foreclosure of a mortgage.

In 1932 it was purchased by a distant relative of the Aughnanure O'Flahertys, Peadar O'Flaherty of Enniscorthy, County Wexford. He donated it to the State in 1952, recognising that its archeological, historical, and architectural significance would be best preserved that way. Shortly after completing his gift, he died.

It is now managed by the Office of Public Works, the Irish State body responsible for national monuments and historic properties.
