= Rúaidhri Ua Flaithbheartaigh =

Rúaidhri Ua Flaithbheartaigh (died 1061) was King of Iar Connacht.

== Biography ==
Áed in Gai Bernaig, King of Connacht from 1046 to 1067, had invaded and conquered Maigh Seóla in 1051, blinding its king. Ruaidhri, king since 1059, and the family rebelled, leading to the battle of Glen Patrick.

The Annals of the Four Masters, sub anno 1061, state that:

Maidhm Glinne Pattraicc ria n-Aodh Ua Conchobhair for Iarthair Connacht, in ro mudhaighith ile im Ruaidhri Ua Flaithbheartaigh, tigherna Iarthair Connacht, & ro dicendadh é, & ruccadh a ceann co Cruachain Chonnacht iar sraoineadh for mac Aodha mic Ruaidhri/The victory of Gleann-Phadraig was gained by Aedh Ua Conchobhair over the people of West Connaught, where many were slain, together with Ruaidhri. O'Flaithbheartaigh, lord of West Connaught, was beheaded, and his head was carried to Cruachain in Connaught, after the son of Aedh, son of Ruaidhri, had been defeated.

The following year it was recorded that "Tadhg, son of Aedh Ua Conchobhair, was slain by the son of Aedh, son of Ruaidhri, and the people of West Connaught."

His grandson, Muireadhach mac Aedh (died 1124), was the ancestor of the Mac Aedha (McHugh, Hughes) family of County Galway.

Preceded by Cathal mac Tigernán	King of Maigh Seóla; 1059–1061	Succeeded by Aedh Ua Flaithbheartaigh

== See also ==
- Ó Flaithbertaigh
