= Conchobhar Ua Flaithbheartaigh =

Conbhobhar Ua Flaithbertaigh (died 1132) was King of Iar Connacht.

== Biography ==
The succession of the chiefs of Muintir Murchada after 1098 is uncertain, but Conchobhar seems to have succeeded Muireadhach, who died in 1121. He was Ua Conchobair's governor of Dun Gallimhe.

Mac Carthaigh's Book sub anno 1125 states that:

Flann and Gillariabhach, the two sons of Aineislis Ua hEidhin, were slain by Conchobhar Ua Flaithbheartaigh.

An entry of the same date in the Annals of the Four Masters states that this occurred in Dun Gallimhe.

Ua Flaithbheartaigh died in defense of the fort in 1132. Mac Carthaigh's Book state that:

A hosting on land by Cormac Mac Carthaigh and the nobles of Leath Mogha into ... and Uí Eachach and Corca Laoighdhe, and the fleet of Leath Mogha [came] by sea to meet them, and they demolished the castle of Bun Gaillmhe, and plundered and burned the town. The defeat of An Cloidhe [was inflicted] on the following day on [the men of] Iarthar Connacht by the same fleet, and Conchobhar Ó Flaithbheartaigh, king of Iarthar Connacht, was killed, with slaughter of his people.

Preceded by Muireadhach Ua Flaithbheartaigh	Kings of Iar Connacht; 1121?–1132	Succeeded by Ruaidhri Ua Flaithbheartaigh

== See also ==
- Ó Flaithbertaigh
