= Muireadhach mac Aedh =

Muireadhach mac Aedh, Lord of Clann Cosgraigh, died 1124. He was a distant cousin of the Muintir Murchada, of whom the O'Flahertys were chiefs.

The Annals of the Four Masters, sub anno 1124, state that "Muireadhach (i.e., lord of Clann-Cosgraigh), the son of Aedh, son of Ruaidhri, died an ecclesiastic". John O'Donovan, who edited the 1856 publishing of the Annals of the Four Masters, inserts "O'Flaithbheartaigh" after Ruaidhri's name, but this appears to be a mistake; O'Donovan may have confused the Lord of Clann Cosgraigh with another Muireadhach mac Aedh mac Ruaidhri, who was an actual O'Flaherty. The McHughs, according to O'Flaherty, descend from Dungalaigh m. Cenn Faelad m. Colgan in generation 12 of his genealogical table, whereas the Muireadhach m. Aedh m. Ruaidri O'Flaherty is in generation 111 in the lineage of the O'Flahertys, as cited in O'Hart.

Muireadhach's immediate descendants adopted the surname Mac Aedha. The surname is now rendered McHugh or Hughes, less commonly McGagh (better reflecting the Irish pronunciation).

== Genealogy ==
- Genealach Mec Aodha/The genealogy of Mac Aodha: Donnchadh s. Maol Eachlainn, the archbishop, s. Maol Eachlainn s. Donnchadh s. Aodh s. Tadhg s. Muireadhach s. Aodh s. Ruaidhrí s. Coscrach s. Flann Abhradh s. Gamhnán s. Conaing s. Muirgheas s. Coscrach Mór s. Donn s. Cumasach s. Dúnghal s. Ceann Faoladh s. Colga s. Aodh s. Seanach s. Duach Teangumha s. Fearghus s. Muireadhach Mál (the king) s. Eóghan Sréabh s. Duach Galach s. Brian.

From Leabhar na nGenealach, 201.6, pp. 442–43, volume I.

== See also ==
- Ruaidhri Mac Aedha, Lord of Clan Cosgraigh, died 1170.
- Máel Sechlain Mac Áeda, Archbishop of Tuam, died 1348.
