= Áedh Ó Flaithbheartaigh =

Áedh Ó Flaithbheartaigh, Taoiseach of Iar Connacht and Chief of the Name, fl. c. 1377?-1407.

== Reign ==
Few details appear to be known of him, he being the first of the family to appear in the annals since the time of Ruaidhri Ó Flaithbheartaigh.

He built the church at Annaghdown in 1410 - the monastery of Annaghdown was burned in 1413 - and was succeeded by his son, Domnell.

== Annalistic references ==
- 1384. A meeting, took place between O'Flaherty and O'Malley, but a quarrel arose between them, in which Owen O'Malley, Cormac O'Malley (i.e. Cormac Cruinn), and many others besides these, were slain by the people of O'Flaherty.
- 1396. Conor, the son of Owen O'Malley, went on an incursion with a ship's crew to West Connaught, and loaded the ship with the riches and prizes taken by that adventure. But all, save one man only, were drowned between Ireland and Aran.
- 1402. Brian, the son of Donnell O'Flaherty, heir to the lordship of Carn Gegach, died.
- 1407. Hugh O'Flaherty, Lord of West Connaught, died at an advanced age.

Preceded by Brian Ó Flaithbheartaigh	Taoiseach of Iar Connacht c.1377?–1407	Succeeded by Domnell mac Áedh Ó Flaithbheartaigh

== See also ==
- Ó Flaithbertaigh
