= Cathal mac Tigernán =

Cathal mac Tigernán (died 1059) was King of Iar Connacht.

== Biography ==
Áed in Gai Bernaig, King of Connacht from 1046 to 1067, had invaded and conquered Maigh Seóla in 1051, blinding its king. Cathal mac Tigernán is the next ruler of the kingdom recorded, but only upon his death in 1059. No details are given beyond that he was killed. His relationship to the rest of the dynasty is uncertain.

Preceded by Amhalgaidh mac Cathal	King of Maigh Seóla; 1051?–1059	Succeeded by Rúaidhri Ua Flaithbheartaigh
