= Áodh Ó Flaithbheartaigh =

Áodh Ó Flaithbheartaigh, Lord of Iar Connacht and Chief of the Name, died 1538.

Preceded by Gilla Dubh Ó Flaithbheartaigh	Lord of Iar Connacht ?–1538	Succeeded by Domnell Crone Ó Flaithbheartaigh
