= McHugo =

McHugo (also McHugho and MacHugo) is an Irish surname. Notable people with this name include:

- Edmond MacHugo (alias MacCoug, MacCook, Cook) (alive 1559), Irish Chief of the Name
- Anthony McHugo (died 1711), Irish cleric, the third and last attested Prior of Portumna Priory
- James MacHugo, 18th-century Irish merchant
- Colin McHugo (born 1945), British professional tennis player

McHugo can also refer to McHugo Peak, a mountain in Antarctica.

== See also ==
- McHugh
