= Chris Canavan =

George Christopher Canavan (6 June 1928 – 1 March 2013) was a British television and stage actor. On television, Canavan was known for his recurring roles as an extra on the British soap opera, Coronation Street, for more than fifty years, from 1962 until 2013.

== Background ==
Born in Belfast, Canavan moved to Preston, Lancashire with his family when he was eleven years old. Canavan served in the Merchant Navy. Canavan owned and operated a window cleaning business, which he acquired after beginning his acting career. He continued to work as a cleaner until 2012.

Canavan became an actor after marrying his wife, Maureen. He studied in Southport drama school. He continued to act on the side after taking over his window cleaning business. He joined the companies of the Preston Drama Club and Broughton Players during the 1950s. His career in television began after he was spotted by a television professional while performing in a Roy Barraclough-directed play at the Skipton Festival.Canavan was soon cast on television shows on the BBC and Granada Television spanning several decades. He appeared in the 1981 series, Brideshead Revisited, starring Laurence Olivier, as well as The Liver Birds and Prime Suspect.

== Coronation Street ==
Chris Canavan first appeared as an extra on Coronation Street in 1962. He would continue to appear in multiple background roles on the show for more than fifty years from 1962 to 2013, becoming the longest serving extra in the show's history. It was not uncommon for actors to play several characters on the show during the early years of Coronation Street. For example, Canavan played a construction worker named Dusty and a mouse and rat catcher. He often appeared as a customer and a rover at The Rovers, a fictional pub often featured in the show. Another of Canavan's characters attended the wedding of Rita Sullivan and Dennis Tanner on the show. Though much of his work on Coronation Street, included small, nonspeaking parts, Canavan developed a following among fans.

Canavan died from a heart attack on 1 March 2013, at the age of 84. He was predeceased by his wife and survived by three children and four grandchildren. His funeral was held at St Mary's Church in Fulwood, where he had resided.
