= Annaghdown =

Civil parish with villages in County Galway, Ireland

Annaghdown Eanach Dhúin
- Civil parish with villages
- Location in Ireland
- Coordinates: 53°23′24″N 9°04′23″W
- Country: Ireland
- Province: Connacht
- County: County Galway

Government
  - Dáil Éireann: Galway West

Area
  - Total: 2.776 km^{2} (1.072 sq mi)
- Time zone: UTC+0 (WET)
  - Summer (DST): UTC-1 (IST (WEST))
- Irish Grid Reference: M286382

Annaghdown (from Irish Eanach Dhúin, meaning 'the marsh of the fort', pronounced [ˌanˠəx ˈɣuːnʲ]) is a civil parish in County Galway, Ireland. It lies around Annaghdown Bay, an inlet of Lough Corrib. Villages in the civil parish include Corrandulla, Cloonboo, and Annaghdown, a census settlement in the east of the parish, with Corrandrum National School located at its eastern end. The townland of Annaghdown is located at the western end of the parish.

Annaghdown is also an ecclesiastical parish in the Roman Catholic Archdiocese of Tuam and the Church of Ireland Diocese of Tuam, Limerick and Killaloe.

== Etymology ==
According to the Early Ecclesiastical Settlement Names of County Galway (1996):

"The name Eanach Dhúin signifies the 'marsh of the Dún or fort.' The word Dún is one of the most common elements denoting secular settlement in early placenames. It usually refers to an enclosed settlement or ringfort and in the early historical period it appears to designate the principal dwelling of the local king or chieftain. The placename ... probably referred to the marshlands attached to the fort of the chieftain of Maigh Seola, which would have been granted as a site for a church."

== History ==
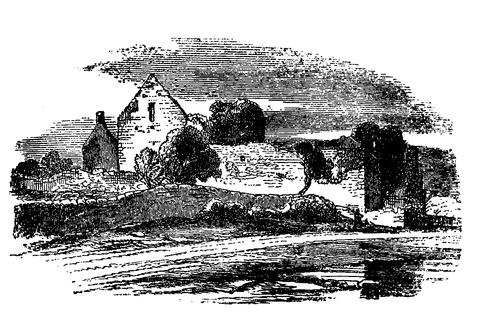
Illustration of Monastic Ruins at Annaghdown

Little is known of the early history of Annaghdown, which does not appear in the annals until the twelfth century. Two historical sources state it was granted to St. Brendan of Clonfert by King Áed mac Echach of Connacht. Francis Byrne believed that as Áed's territory of Uí Bhriúin Aoi lay in County Roscommon, it was not within his power to grant the land of another chieftain so distant from him. However, as noted by Hubert Knox, the dynasty may have actually originated in this region, which would explain this donation.

The earliest reliable reference to Annaghdown occurs in Comainmniguid Noem nErenn, composed c. 800, which contains a reference to Ciarán Enaigh Dúin, (Ciarán of Annaghdown). This, together with placename evidence indicates an association with Ciarán of Clonmacnoise as opposed to Brendan of Clonfert. The connection with Clonfert may have been no more than a reflection of an attempt by Clonfert to justify its claim on the church of Annaghdown at a later period.

During the twelfth century the monastery of St Mary for Augustinian canons was built c. 1140. Following this the new diocese of Annaghdown was established by the Ó Flaithbheartaigh kingdom of Iar Connacht about 1179 from the lands of their kingdom and separated from the Diocese of Tuam, controlled by their rival Ó Conchubhair dynasty. The Archbishop of Tuam at the turn of the fourteenth-century, William de Bermingham, claimed Ruadhri Ua Flaithbertaigh placed his chaplain, named "Coneghor" (Conchobhar?), in the position of bishop, but he later resigned the position. A bishop's palace and cathedral were built in the late twelfth century. Although not listed in the earlier Synods of Rathbreasail or Kells, Annaghdown diocese survived nonetheless for many centuries through monastic outreach from Annaghdown Abbey. The ecclesiastical settlement attracted two Continental monastic orders in the early thirteenth century, the Arrouaisians and Premonstratensians who also built religious houses.

The title Bishop of Annaghdown is known to have been in use from c. 1189 when Conn O Mellaigh was one of three Irish bishops to attend the coronation of King Richard I at Westminster. The Ó Meallaig family were the traditional hereditary churchmen of Annaghdown. Several bishops, from 1189 to 1485, were systematically elected by its 'Cathedral Chapter' and, despite many counterclaims from Tuam, some were approved by Rome. Between 1253 and 1306, the bishopric was united to the archbishopric of Tuam, although in this period there were two bishops. In 1255 the Justicar of Ireland, John FitzGeoffrey and his successor Richard de la Rochelle, who held extensive Connacht land grants, gave recognition to the diocese of Annaghdown over protests from the Archbishop of Tuam and his suffragans, who appealed to Rome.

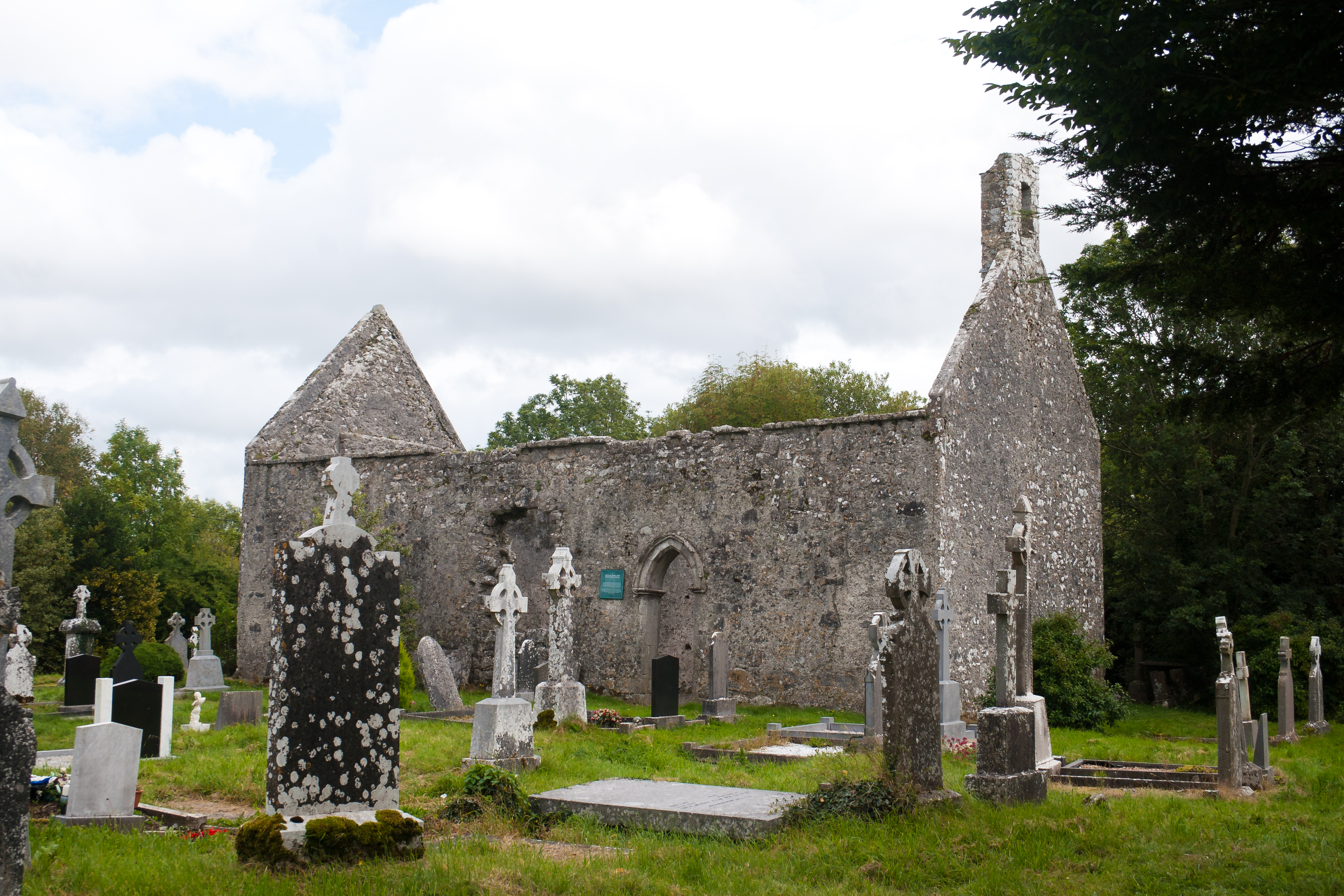
Annaghdown Cathedral

In 1410, Áedh Ó Flaithbheartaigh financed the building of a church at Annaghdown.

In 1485, when the Wardenship of Galway was created, Annaghdown was formally united with Tuam by Papal decree, and some of its parishes, Claregalway, Moycullen and Shrule, were formally attached to the new wardenship. However, the title still survives as Bishop of Eanach Dúin, currently held by Bishop Octavio Cisneros, Auxiliary Bishop of New York, since 2006.

The ruins of Annaghdown Abbey and the 15th century cathedral survive as a National Monument.

Annaghdown Castle was erected by the O'Flahertys in the late 14th century, on the east shore of Lough Corrib, where it still stands, now restored.

=== Drowning Tragedy ===
On Thursday, 4 September 1828, 20 people travelling to Galway on the Caisleán Nua were drowned when a sheep put its foot through the floor of the boat. This tragedy later became the subject of a famous lament, Eanach Dhúin, composed by the famous blind Irish poet, Antoine Ó Raifteirí. A memorial stone was erected at Annaghdown Pier in 1978 by the Annaghdown Anglers Club, 150 years after the tragedy occurred.

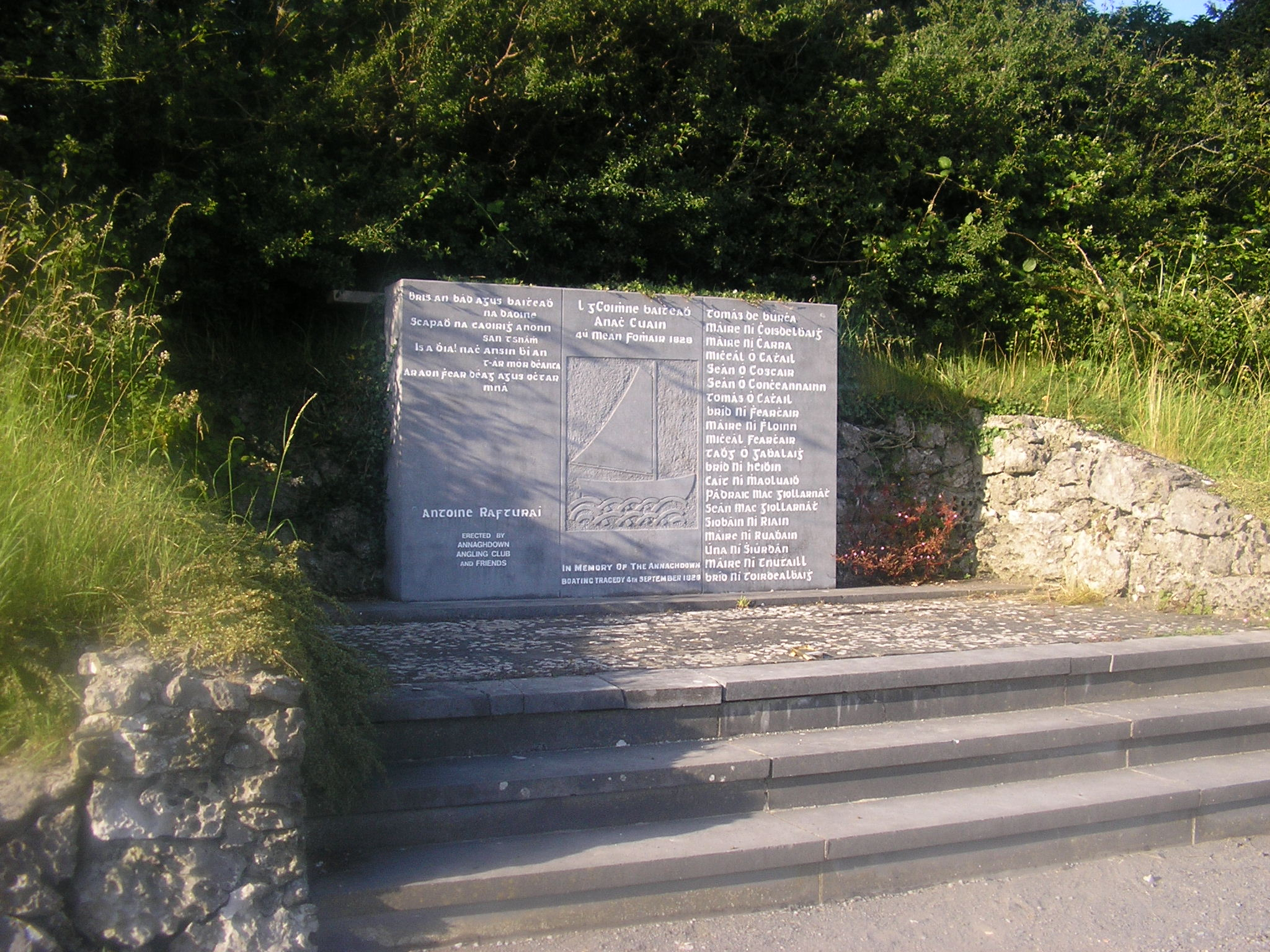
Memorial at Annaghdown Pier, erected in 1978 in memory of those drowned in 1828

The Connacht Journal of 4 September reported the following:

An old row-boat in a rotten and leaky condition, started from Annaghdown early in the morning, a distance from Galway up Lough Corrib of about eight miles, having, it is calculated, about 31 persons on board, who were coming to the fair of Galway; the boat and passengers proceeded without obstruction until they arrived opposite Bushy Park within two miles of Galway, when she suddenly went down and all on board perished except about 12 persons who were fortunately rescued from their perilous situation by another boat. Eighteen of the bodies of these unhappy creatures were taken out of the lake in the course of the day and presented a most heart-rending scene, being surrounded by their friends who came to identify them, and by whom they were removed in a boat to Annaghdown.

The boat was in such an unsound state as to render her unfit for the passage. The unfortunate accident happened by a sheep putting its leg through one of the planks, which produced a leak, in order to stop which one of the passengers applied his great coat to the aperture and stamped it with his foot. In doing so he started one of the planks altogether, which caused the boat's immediate sinking, having been overloaded; ten sheep, a quantity of lumber, and about 31 persons being on board.

Eighteen of the bodies have been found; 12 have escaped, and one is missing. Major Dickson and a party of the 64th Regiment attended and rendered every humane assistance in their power. An inquest was held on the bodies by John Blakeney Esq., Coroner, at which James O'Hara, Esq., M.P., and J. H. Burke, Esq., Mayor, attended, and the jury returned a verdict of "accidental drowning".

The following are the names of the persons drowned and taken out of the lake: Bridget Farragher, Mary Costello, Judith Ryan, Bridget Hynes, Mary Newell, Winifred Jourdan, Mary Flynn, Bridget Curley, Catherine Mulloy, Mary Carr, Michael Farragher, Michael Cahill, John Cosgrove, John Concannon, Thomas Burke, Patrick Forde, John Forde and Timothy Goaley.

It is said that two more were drowned and their bodies were later discovered: Thomas Cahill and Mary Ruane, making a total of 20. John Cosgrove saved two women, but was drowned in trying to save the third. He was a lime-burner by trade. The remains of his house are still to be seen in the Blake estate - "Teach Chosgardha". Raftery's poem seems to be in error in mentioning only 19 victims.

== Sport ==
Annaghdown has Gaelic football, hurling, camogie and soccer clubs. The local hurling and Gaelic football club, Annaghdown GAA, has playing fields and a clubhouse in Cregg townland, on the road linking Cloonboo, on the N84, to Claregalway, on the N17.

Corrib Celtic AFC is the local soccer club which has its grounds next to Annaghdown National School. Also beside Annaghdown National School is an indoor handball alley which caters for handball and racquet sports such as racquetball and squash. The courts were run down for a number of years but have recently been refurbished and a Handball and Raquetball Club is now active. Corrib RFC, a rugby club, is located in the nearby town of Headford.

Annaghdown Vikings basketball club is the local club there. They play their home games in Corrandulla hall. They have basketball starting from academy upto senior

== Poetry and music ==
=== Eanach Dhúin ===
This poem was composed by the travelling Irish poet, Antoine Ó Raifteirí, as a lament of the twenty people drowned at Menlo, Galway, on 4 September 1828.

"Eanach Dhúin"	English Translation
Má fhaighimse sláinte, is fada a bheidh trácht Ar an méid a bádh as Eanach Dhúin. Is mo thrua amárach gach athair 's máthair Bean is páiste atá ag sileadh súl! A Rí na nGrást a cheap neamh is parthas, Nár bheag an tábhacht dúinn beirt no triúr, Ach lá chomh breá leis, gan gaoth ná báisteach Lán an bháid acu a scuab ar shiúl. Nár mhór an t-ionadh os comhair na ndaoine Á bhfeiceáil sínte ar chúl a gcinn, Screadadh agus caoineadh a scanródh daoine, Gruaig á cíoradh is an chreach á roinnt. Bhí buachaillí óga ann, teacht an fhómhair, Ag síneadh chróchar, is á dtabhairt go cill. Is gurb é gléas a bpósta a bhí dá dtórramh Is a Rí na Glóire nár mhór an feall.	If my health is spared I'll be long relating Of the number who drowned from Annaghdown And the keening after of mother and father And child by the harbour, the mournful croon! King of Graces, who died to save us, T'were of little importance but two or three, But a boat-load bravely in calm day sailing Without storm or rain to be swept away. What wild despair was on all the faces To see them there in the light of day, In every place there was lamentation, And tearing of hair as the wreck was shared. And boys there lying when crops were ripening, From the strength of life they were borne to clay In their wedding clothes for their wake they robed them O King of Glory, man's hope is in vain.

Irish songwriter Dick Farrelly wrote the song, "Annaghdown". The song was recorded by Sinead Stone & Gerard Farrelly on the album, "Legacy of a Quiet Man". Farrelly is best remembered for his song Isle of Innisfree, theme of the film, "The Quiet Man".

== Education ==
There are four primary schools in Annaghdown parish: Annaghdown N.S., Castlehackett N.S., Corrandulla N.S. and Corrandrum N.S.

== Annalistic references ==
The Annals of Inisfallen and Annals of the Four Masters contain a number of references to Annaghdown.

- AI1044.4 Aed, the anchorite, rested in Enach Dúin.
- M1241.1. Bishop O'Flaherty (i.e. Murtough), i.e. the Bishop of Annadown, died.
- 1411. The monastery of Annadown in the county of Galway was burned.

== See also ==
- Cregg Mill, County Galway
- Seoirse Brún
- Annaghdown Parish Council Website - Local Annaghdown News & Information
