= Maelan mac Cathmogha =

Maelan mac Cathmogha (died 848) was King of Maigh Seóla.

== Origins ==
Maelan appears to be one of the earliest recorded kings of the territory of Maigh Seola, later known as Uí Briúin Seóla.

Magh Seola was surrounded to the east by the Soghain and the Uí Maine; to the south Máenmag and the Uí Fiachrach Aidhne; to the west by the Delbhna Tir Dha Locha; to the north and far north-west, the Conmhaicne.

== The Viking Wars ==
In the first half of the 9th century, Ireland experienced raids by Vikings. Some occurred in Connacht:

- 812 - A slaughter of the heathens by the men of Umall (Clew Bay). A slaughter of the Conmhaicne by the heathens.
- 813 - The slaughter at Umall by the heathens in which fell Coscrach son of Flannabra and Dúnadach, king of Umall.
- 835 -All the country of Connaught was likewise desolated by them.
- 837 - A battle was gained by the Gentiles over the Connaughtmen, wherein was slain Maelduin, son of Muirgius mac Tommaltaig, with numbers of others along with him.
- 843 - An expedition by Turgesius, lord of the foreigners, upon Loch Ribh (Lough Ree, so that they plundered Connaught and Meath, and burned Cluain Mic Nois (Clonmacnoise, with its oratories, Cluain Fearta Brenainn, (Clonfert), Tir Da Ghlas (Terryglass), Lothra (Lorrha), and many others in like manner.
- 844 - A battle was gained over the Connaughtmen by the foreigners, in which Riagan, son of Fearghus; Mughron, son of Diarmaid; and Aedh, son of Catharnach, with many others, were slain.
- 847 - A fleet of seven score ships of the people of the king of the foreigners came to contend with the foreigners that were in Ireland before them, so that they disturbed Ireland between them.

During one such episode in 848, Maelan was slain by the foreigners. He is anachronistically referred to as lord of Ui Briuin of South Connaught.

Preceded by Donn mac Cumasgach?	King of Maigh Seóla ?–848	Succeeded by Murchadh mac Maenach
