= Mac meic Aedh Ua Flaithbheartaigh =

Irish provincial king, 11th century

Mac meic Aedh Ua Flaithbheartaigh (died 1091) was King of Iar Connacht.

== Biography ==
The chief who died in 1091 is given as mac meic Aed Ua Flaithbheartaigh/son of the son of Aedh Ua Flaithbheartaigh, hence his forename is unknown. No further details are known.

Preceded by Aedh Ua Flaithbheartaigh	King of Iar Connacht; 1079?–1091	Succeeded by Flaithbertaigh Ua Flaithbertaigh

== See also ==
- Ó Flaithbertaigh
