= Flaithbertaigh Ua Flaithbertaigh =

Flaithbertaigh Ua Flaithbertaigh (died 1098) was King of Iar Connacht.

== Biography ==
Flaithbertaigh was third or fourth chief of the Muintir Murchada before their expulsion from Uí Briúin Seóla by the Ua Conchobair kings of Connacht. The first to bear the surname was Murchadh an Chapail Ua Flaithbheartaigh, King of Uí Briúin Seóla (died 1036).

He was foster-father to the then King of Connacht, Ruaidrí na Saide Buide, who was in turn godfather to Flaithbertaigh's children. In 1092 he subdued Ruaidri in his own house and had him blinded, making himself king in Ruaidri's place. However, in 1098, possibly after being dethroned, he was killed by the family of Ruaidri.

== See also ==
- Ó Flaithbertaigh

Preceded by Ruaidrí na Saide Buide	Kings of Connacht; 1092–1095	Succeeded by Tadg mac Ruaidrí Ua Conchobair
Preceded by Mac meic Aedh Ua Flaithbheartaigh	Kings of Iar Connacht; 1091–1098	Succeeded by Brian Ua Flaithbertaigh?
