= Clann Taidg =

Area of County Galway, Ireland

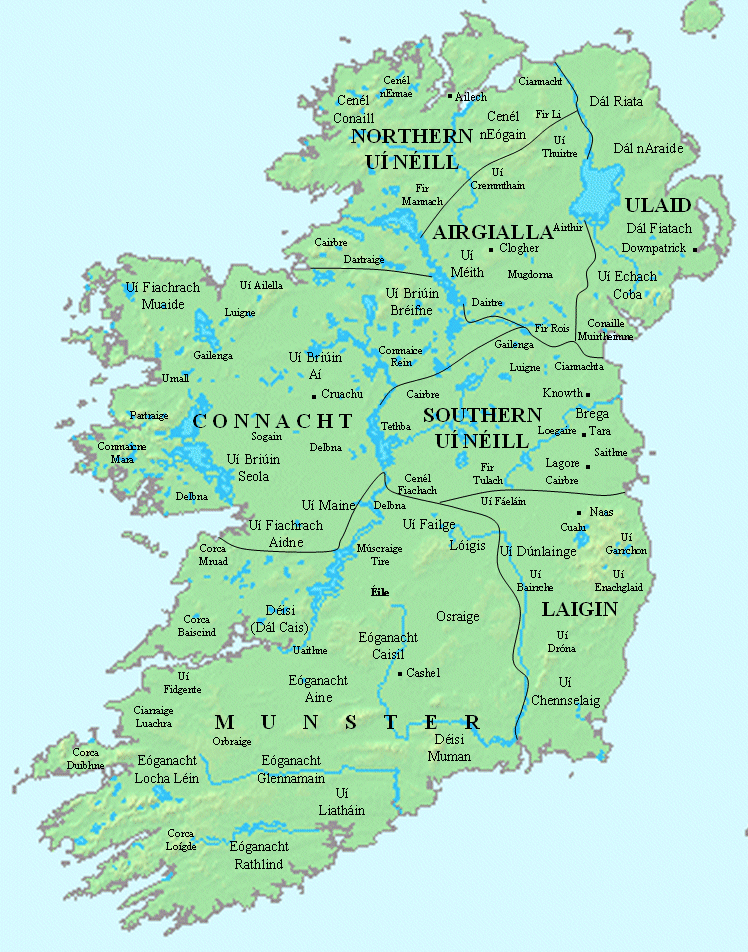
Early peoples and kingdoms of Ireland, c.800, some two hundred years before the creation of Clann Taidg

Clann Taidg was the name of a medieval cantred located in what is now County Galway, Ireland.

It consisted of the parishes of Athenry, Monivea, Tiaquin, Kilkerrin, Moylough, Killererin, Ballynakill-Aghiart (in Killian), Kilmoylan, and possibly Abbeyknockmoy.

Clann Taidg consisted of a number of túaths, including Corca Mogha and Uí Diarmata.

Clann Taidg seems to have come into existence during a wave of expansion by the Uí Briúin, specifically in the reign of King Tadg of Connacht (925-956). His son, Muiredaig mac Tadg, was the ancestor to the Uí Taidg an Teaghlaigh sept of the Síl Muiredaig who are recorded in the annals from 1048 onwards. The area, previously part of Uí Briúin Seóla, was called after the sept who are believed to have become its lords sometime in the mid-eleventh century. However, by the end of the twelfth century it was said to have been seized by Donn Cathaig Mór Mac Airechtaig of Síl Muiredaig.

Adrian Martyn notes that "an Teaghlaigh," meaning "of the household," denotes that Clann Taidg were "hereditary marshalls to their cousins, the kings of Connacht." Clann Taidg are also credited with evicting the Ui Mainnin Kings of Soghain from the Athenry area, c. 1135-52.

By 1241 much of the area was seized by Meyler de Bermingham, who made Athenry the seat of his lordship.

== See also ==
- Clann Fhergail
- Conmhaicne Mara
- Delbhna Tir Dha Locha
- Donn Óge Mag Oireachtaigh
- Muintir Murchada
- Senchineoil
- Uí Maine
- Soghain
- Trícha Máenmaige
- Uí Díarmata
- Cóiced Ol nEchmacht
- Síol Anmchadha
- Iar Connacht
- Maigh Seola
- Cenél Áeda na hEchtge

== Sources ==
- Medieval Ireland: Territorial, Political and Economic Divisions, Paul MacCotter, Four Courts Press, 2008, pp. 134–135. ISBN 978-1-84682-098-4
