= Cathal mac Ruaidhri =

Cathal mac Ruaidhri (died 1043) was King of Maigh Seóla/Iar Connacht.

== Biography ==
Cathal was the great-grandson of Flaithbheartach mac Eimhin, the eponym of the Ua Flaithbertaig chiefs and fourth great-grandson of Murchadh mac Maenach, the namesake of the Muintir Murchada. The year after he became king, the annals record that "Cathal, son of Ruaidhri, lord of West Connaught, went on his pilgrimage to Ard-Macha (Armagh)." He appears to have died there in 1043. He was succeeded by his son, Amhalgaidh.

| Preceded by Murchadh an Chapail Ua Flaithbheartaigh | King of Maigh Seóla; 1036–1043 | Succeeded by Amhalgaidh mac Cathal |
