= Murchad mac Brian Ó Flaithbheartaigh =

Murchad mac Brian Ó Flaithbheartaigh (died 1419) was Taoiseach of Iar Connacht and Chief of the Name.

== Overview ==
In 1846, James Hardiman stated:

Before the close of the thirteenth century, the O'Flaherties became masters of the entire territory of Iar-Connacht, extending from the western banks of Lough Orbsen, to the shores of the Atlantic. Separated from the rest of the kingdom, in that peninsulated, and then almost inaccessible district, they interfered but little in the external transactions of the province, and are, therefore, but seldom noted in our Annals for the two succeeding centuries.

Murchad was one of the first of the family to feature in the annals in over a hundred years. Even so, it was not until the middle 16th century that the family gained sufficient prominence to become regularly worthy of note in Gaelic annals.

Preceded by Domnell mac Áedh Ó Flaithbheartaigh	Taoiseach of Iar Connacht; 1410?–1419	Succeeded by Gilla Dubh Ó Flaithbheartaigh

== See also ==
- Ó Flaithbertaigh
