= Brian Ó Flaithbheartaigh =

Irish chieftain

Brian Ó Flaithbheartaigh (died 1377) was a possible Taoiseach of Iar Connacht and Chief of the Name.

== Reign ==
Brian may have been Taoiseach, but he is not explicitly named as such in his obituary.

== Annalistic reference ==
- 1377. Walter, son of Sir David Burke; Donnell, son of Farrell, son of the Manach O'Gallagher; Geoffrey O'Flanagan, Chief of Clann-Chathail; Donough, son of William Alainn; O'Carroll, Lord of Ely; Dermot Bacagh Mac Branan, Chief of Corcachlann; Faghtna, son of David O'More; and Brian O'Flaherty, died.

Preceded by Ruaidhri Ó Flaithbheartaigh	Taoiseach of Iar Connacht ?–1377	Succeeded by Áedh Ó Flaithbheartaigh

== See also ==
- Ó Flaithbertaigh
