= Amhalgaidh mac Cathal =

Amhalgaidh mac Cathal (died 1075) was King of Maigh Seóla and Iar Connacht.

== Biography ==
Amhalgaidh was the son of the previous king, Cathal mac Ruaidhri, who appears to have died at Armagh in 1043. He was lord in 1051 when the annals state that:

Amhalgaidh, son of Cathal, lord of West Connaught, was blinded by Aedh Ua Conchobhair, lord of East Connaught, after he had been held in captivity for the space of one year and upwards; after which he (Ua Conchobhair) fixed his residence in West Connaught.

The Annals of Inisfallen state that in 1048 Inis Locha Cime was sacked and razed by Ua Conchobuir, king of Connachta.

From this point onwards, the Ua Conchobair kings of Connacht made their residence in Maigh Seola. While they still possessed lands on the east shores of Lough Corrib, the Muintir Murchada began to move into what is now known as Connemara.

Amhalgaidh died in 1075.

Preceded by Cathal mac Ruaidhri	King of Maigh Seóla; 1043?–1051	Succeeded by Cathal mac Tigernán
