= MacHugh =

MacHugh is a Scottish surname. People with this surname include:

- Philip MacHugh O'Reilly (1599–1655) member of parliament for County Cavan in the Irish Parliament
- Phil MacHugh (born 1983), Scottish television presenter and media consultant
- Patrick MacHugh (born 1992), Scottish badminton player

== See also ==
- McHugh
