= Murtough Ua Flaithbertaigh =

Irish provincial king, died 1204

Murtough Ua Flaithbertaigh (died 1204) was King of Iar Connacht.

Preceded by Ruadhri Ua Flaithbertaigh	King of Iar Connacht; 1197?–1204	Succeeded by Rudhraighe Ó Flaithbheartaigh

== See also ==
- Ó Flaithbertaigh
