= Murchad mac Flann mac Glethneachan =

Murchad mac Flann mac Glethneachan (fl. 973) was King of Maigh Seóla.

== Biography ==
All that is known of Murchad is contained in an entry in the Annals of the Four Masters, sub anno 973, the year Murchadh Glunillar ua Flaithbheartach, King of Aileach, invaded Connacht and gave battle to King Cathal mac Tadg at Ceis Corran. Cathal was killed as were some of his prime vassals - "Geibheannach, son of Aedh, lord of Ui-Maine; Tadhg, son of Muircheartach, chief of Ui-Diarmada; Murchadh, son of Flann, son of Glethneachan, chief of Clann-Murchadha; and Seirridh Ua Flaithbheartaigh, with a countless number along with them."

Murchadh totally plundered Connaught afterwards, while Cathal was succeeded as King of Connacht by Cathal mac Conchobar mac Taidg.

== See also ==
- Cathal mac Tadg, King of Connacht
- Geibennach mac Aedha, King of Uí Maine

Preceded by Donnchadh mac Urchadh	King of Maigh Seóla; 973	Succeeded by Ruaidhri mac Coscraigh
