= Murchadh mac Maenach =

Murchadh mac Maenach (died 896) was King of Maigh Seóla.

== Biography ==
Murchadh is one of the earliest-attested kings of his region. He is noteworthy as the person who gave his name to the Muintir Murchada, a dynasty whose leading family later took the surname Ó Flaithbheartaigh (O'Flaherty). At this point in time, his people lived east of Lough Corrib, their territory centered on Lough Cime (Lough Hackett), Tuam, County Galway. They would be expelled by the O'Connors in the 1050s.

The genealogies list two sons, Urchadh and Urumhain, with Urchadh listed as having descendants. A Cleirchin mac Murchadh of Uí Briúin Seóla is listed in the Annals of the Four Masters under 908, though he does not appear in any other source. Urchadh later became the grandfather of Brian Boru.

According to the genealogies, Murchard's great-great-great-great-grandson was Flaithbheartach mac Eimhin, whose grandson, Muredach Mór Ua Flaithbheartaigh, apparently became the first to bear the surname. Muredach Mór had three sons—Ruaidri of Lough Cime, Donough Aluinn and Aedh. From Ruaidri are the senior lines of the clan (those of Conmaicne Mara (later known as Connemara), Moycullen and Sliocht Diarmaid).

Preceded by Maelan mac Cathmogha	King of Maigh Seóla; 848?–891	Succeeded by Cléirchén mac Murchadh

== See also ==
- Ó Flaithbertaigh
