= Domnell Crone Ó Flaithbheartaigh =

Domnell Crone Ó Flaithbheartaigh (died 1560) was a Lord of Iar Connacht, Ireland, and Chief of the Name.

Preceded by Áodh Ó Flaithbheartaigh	Lord of Iar Connacht; 1538–1560	Succeeded by Murrough na dTuadh Ó Flaithbheartaigh
