= Ruadhri Ua Flaithbertaigh =

Irish provincial king, 12th century

Ruadhri Ua Flaithbertaigh (fl. 1186–1197) was King of Iar Connacht.

== Biography ==
Ruaidhri may have succeeded by killing his brother, Conchubhar; the Annals of Ulster, sub anno 1186, record that "Conchubhar Ua Flaithbertaigh was killed by Ruaidhri Ua Flaithbertaigh, by his own brother, in Ara."

Ruadhri was taken prisoner by King Cathal Crobhdearg Ua Conchobair of Connaught in unknown circumstances in 1197. There is no further record of him.

Preceded by Conchubhar Ua Flaithbheartaigh	King of Iar Connacht; 1186?–1197?	Succeeded by Murtough Ua Flaithbertaigh

== See also ==
- Ó Flaithbertaigh
