= Áedh Mór Ó Flaithbheartaigh =

Áedh Mór Ó Flaithbheartaigh (died 1236) was King of Iar Connacht.

Preceded by Murtough Ua Flaithbertaigh	King of Iar Connacht; 1204?–1236	Succeeded by Morogh Ó Flaithbheartaigh

== See also ==
- Ó Flaithbertaigh
