= Brian mac Maelruanaidh =

Brian mac Maelruanaidh (died 1003) was King of Maigh Seóla.

== Biography ==
All that is known for certain of Brian is contained in his obit, dated 1003:

Brian, son of Maelruanaidh, lord of West Connaught, was slain by his own people

In that year, "the Ui-Fiachrach Aidhne aided by West Connaught fought a battle against the Uí Maine" and "the men of West Meath ... wherein fell Gillaceallaigh, son of Comhaltan Ua Cleirigh, lord of Ui-Fiachrach; Conchobhar, son of Ubban; Ceannfaeladh, son of Ruaidhri, and many others. Finn, son of Marcan, Tanist of Ui-Maine, fell in the heat of the conflict."

It is not known if this conflict had any role in Brian's assassination. Both the Muintir Murchada and Uí Fiachrach Aidhne were allied with Brian Boru, who was the son of a daughter of Urchadh mac Murchadh.

Preceded by Maelcairearda	King of Maigh Seóla; 993?–1003	Succeeded by Muireadhach ua Flaithbheartach
