= Gilla Dubh Ó Flaithbheartaigh =

Lord of Iar Connacht

Gilla Dubh Ó Flaithbheartaigh (died 1442) was Lord of Iar Connacht and Chief of the Name.

== Overview ==
Gilla Dubh was one of the first of the family to feature in the annals in over a hundred years. Even so, it was not until the middle of the 16th century that the family gained sufficient prominence to become regularly worthy of note in Gaelic annals.

He was brother to the previous lord, Murchad mac Brian Ó Flaithbheartaigh. His term is obscure; all that is recorded from his era is the following:

1439. Owen O'Flaherty was treacherously slain in his own bed at night, by a farmer of his own people.

Preceded by Murchad mac Brian Ó Flaithbheartaigh	Lord of Iar Connacht; 1419–1442	Succeeded by ?

== See also ==
- Ó Flaithbertaigh
