= Ruaidhri Ó Flaithbheartaigh =

Ruaidhri Ó Flaithbheartaigh (fl. 1244 – 1273) was King of Iar Connacht and Chief of the Name.

== Biography ==
Ruaidhri was a brother of the preceding chief, Morogh. Ruaidhri and his brother may have accompanied Felim mac Cathal Crobderg Ua Conchobair (reigned 1233–1256), on an expedition to Wales in 1245 under Henry III.

It is not known when Ruaidhri became chief, so it is not certain if an annals entry of 1248 refers to him. It states "The entire of Conmaicne Mara was plundered by the English. The English went upon an expedition against O'Flaherty, who defeated them, and killed numbers of them." An entry of 1256 - "Mac William Burke set out on a predatory expedition against Rory O'Flaherty; he plundered Gno-More and Gno-Beg, and took possession of all Lough Oirbsion (Lough Corrib)" - leaves no doubt that by then he ruled the area.

It is not known when he ceased to be chief. The annals for 1273 state that "Roderic O'Flaherty was banished from West Connaught", but not by whom, or under what circumstances. James Hardiman says of him:

he found, by experience, that it was safer to rely on the battle-axes of his bold Galloglas (Gallowglass) than on appeals to the sovereign against Anglo-Norman outrage in Ireland. In his time the Joyces, a family of British extraction, settled in the northern part of the territory, by the permission and under the protection of the O'Flaherties.

These years also marked the final eradication of any authority the Ó Flaithbheartaigh had over their original homeland of Uí Briúin Seóla. The rest of their history as an independent people would be as rulers of Iar Connacht, or as it is now known, Connemara. Hardiman goes on to say:

Before the close of the thirteenth century, the O'Flaherties became masters of the entire territory of Iar-Connacht, extending from the western banks of Lough Orbsen, to the shores of the Atlantic. Separated from the rest of the kingdom, in that peninsulated, and then almost inaccessible district, they interfered but little in the external transactions of the province, and are, therefore, but seldom noted in our Annals for the two succeeding centuries.

Preceded by Morogh Ó Flaithbheartaigh	King of Iar Connacht ?–1273?	Succeeded by Brian Ó Flaithbheartaigh

== See also ==
- Ó Flaithbertaigh
