= Ruaidhrí mac Coscraigh =

Ruaidhrí mac Coscraigh was King of South Connacht and of Uí Briúin and a fourth great-grandson of the eponym of Clann Cosgraigh. Ruaidhri is mentioned in the Annals of Inisfallen and Tigernach as well as the Leabhar na nGenealach.

Ruaidhrí was slain fighting Conchobar mac Mael Sechnaill, King of Corcu Modruad and Mac Comhaltan Ua Cleirigh of the Uí Fiachrach Aidhne in 993.

Preceded by Murchad mac Flann mac Glethneachan	King of Uí Briúin Seóla; 992?–993	Succeeded by Maelcairearda
