= Delbhna Tír Dhá Locha =

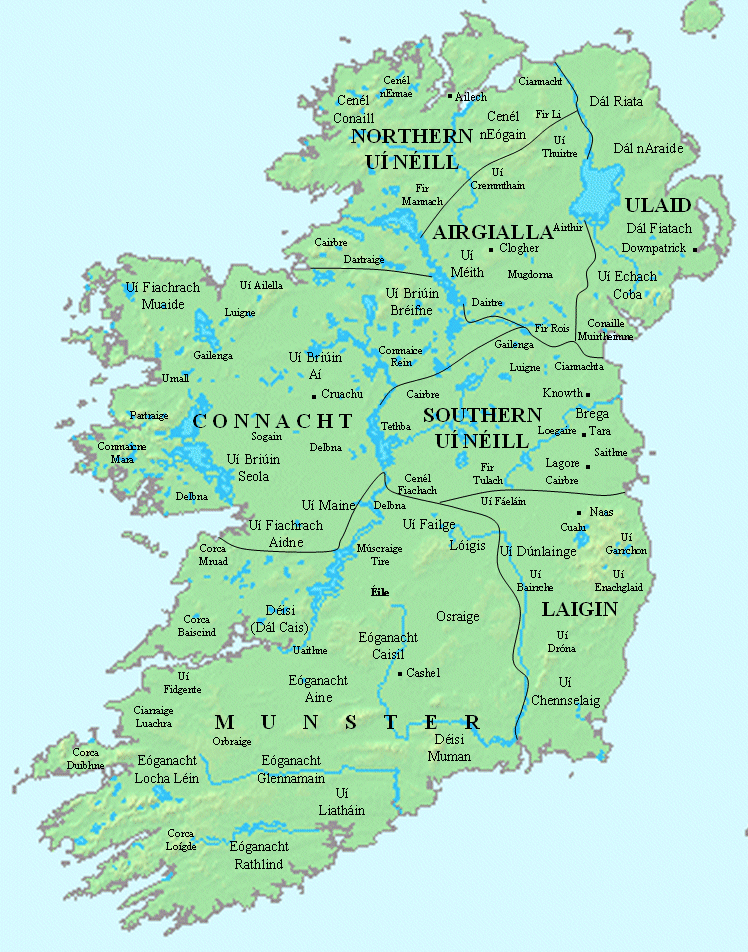
Early peoples and kingdoms of Ireland, c.800

Delbhna Tír Dhá Locha ("The Delbhna of the Two Lakes") was a tuath of Gaelic Ireland, located in the west of Ireland in Connemara, County Galway.

The Delbhna Tír Dhá Locha were one branch of a much larger population group called the Delbhna.

The two lochs to which the name of the territory refers are Loch nOirbsean, and Loch Lurgain. The territory occupied nearly all the land between the two lakes and the River Corrib. It was roughly coextensive with the later barony of Moycullen, which took in the civil parishes of Moycullen, Kilcummin, Killanin, and Rahoon.

The kings of the Delbhna Tír Dhá Locha eventually took the surname Mac Con Raoi (anglicised as Conroy and King).

The Chief of the Name of Clan Mac Con Raoi directly ruled Gnó Mhór, which was later the civil parishes of Kilcummin and Killannin. Gnó Beag's king was later surnamed Ó hÉanaí (anglicised as Heaney and Heeney). Gnó Beag made up of the civil parishes of Rahoon and Moycullen. Loch Lonáin north of the village of Maigh Cuilin (Moycullen) and the Aille River between the villages of An Spidéal (Spiddal) and Indreabháin (Inverin) are the principal features which mark the divide between Gnó Mór and Gnó Beag. All four parishes were combined into the barony of Moycullen (distinct from the parish) soon after the Cambro-Norman invasion.

Both Irish clans were evicted and forced west by the Ó Flaithbertaigh family, who took over their lands. Clan Meic Con Raoi resettled at Ballymaconry (sometimes known as Kingstown Glebe) in Connemara along Streamstown Bay near Clifden, and they had another, Ballyconry in County Clare in the barony of Ballyvaghan. By the 19th century, almost all members of the family had Anglicized their name to King and Ballymaconry became Kingstown. In the early 20th century, styles changed and the family used the Anglicization "Conroy".

The Meic Con Raoi were counted among the sea-kings of Connacht, the others being the O'Malleys, the O'Dowds, and the O'Flahertys.

== See also ==
- Uí Fiachrach Aidhne
- Clann Fhergail
- Muintir Murchada
- Senchineoil
- Soghain
- Trícha Máenmaige
- Uí Díarmata
- Cóiced Ol nEchmacht
- Síol Anmchadha
- Iar Connacht
- Maigh Seola
- Cenél Áeda na hEchtge
