= Ruaidhri Mac Aedha =

Ruaidhri Mac Aedha, Lord of Clann Cosgraigh, died 1170.

Mac Aeda was a descendant of Aedh mac Ruaidri, via his son, Muireadhach mac Aedh, whose descendants took the surname Mac Aedha.

The Clann Mac Aedha were rulers of Clann Cosgraigh, a district on the east shore of Lough Corrib in what is now County Galway.

Ruaidhri Mac Aedha died on a pilgrimage to Tuam in 1170. A 13th-century member of the family would become Archbishop of Tuam.

The surname is now rendered McHugh or Hughes, based on the traditional identification of the name Áed or Aodh with the (unrelated) English name Hugh, though Irish speakers in Galway have also retained a pronunciation that has produced the transcription McGagh, McGah or McGarr.
