= Murrough na dTuadh Ó Flaithbheartaigh =

Irish chief of Iar Connacht (died 1593)

Murrough na dTuadh Ó Flaithbheartaigh, anglicised Sir Murrough O'Flaherty (died 1593) was Chief of Iar Connacht, .

== Ancestry ==
Great-great-great-grandson of Brian na Noinseach, son of Donall na Comthach Ó Flaithbheartaigh (who was, in turn, a great-great-grandson of Ruaidri of Lough Cime). Appointed Chief of the Name by Elizabeth I. Included in the 1585 Composition of Connacht.

== Annalistic references ==
- M1560.7. The Earl of Thomond marched into West Connaught against Murrough-na-dtuath, the son of Teige, son of Murrough, son of Rory O'Flaherty. He passed into the country of the Joyces, by Fuathach, by Bon-an-Bhonnain. The inhabitants of the town of Galway came to defend the ford of Tir-Oilein against him, but he crossed it with the goodwill of some, and in despite of others, and marched through the plain of Clanrickard, both when going and returning.
- M1572.9. A proclamation was issued by the President of the province of Connaught, Sir Edward Phiton, about the festival of St. Patrick, respecting a court to be held at Galway of all those who were under the authority of the Queen, from Limerick to Sligo. At this summons came the Earl of Clanrickard and his sons, Ulick and John, with the chiefs of their people; the descendants of Richard Oge Burke; the Lower Mac William, i.e. John Burke, the son of Oliver, son of John, together with the Lower Burkes; and the Dal-Cais, with their adherents. Upon their arrival before the President in Galway, the two sons of the Earl of Clanrickard, Ulick and John, heard some rumour, on account of which they dreaded the President, and privily fled from the town. When the President heard of this fact, he made prisoners of the chieftains of Clanrickard, and left them in durance in the town; and he himself, with the Earl (the father of the two already referred to, whom he had arrested), proceeded to Athlone, and from thence to Dublin, where he left the Earl, and (then) he himself returned again to Athlone. As soon as the sons of the Earl heard of that affair, they ordered the soldiers and mercenaries of the neighbouring territories to repair to them without delay. That summons was promptly responded to by the Clann-Sweeny of Upper and Lower Connaught, and by the Clann-Donnell Galloglagh (who had many hundreds of Scots along with them). Before however, they had time to assemble together, the President took his forces and soldiers with him to Galway, and carried with him the ordnance and rising out of that town to Achadh-na-n-iubhar, the castle of the sons of Donnell O'Flaherty; and it was Murrough-na-dtuagh, the son of Teige O'Flaherty, that induced him to go on this expedition. Two of the sons of Donnell O'Flaherty were left about i.e. in care of the castle. The President, after having half destroyed the castle, took complete possession of it, and left such part of it as remained undestroyed to Murrough-na-dtuagh O'Flaherty. He then returned to Galway, and passed through Clanrickard and Hy-Many to Athlone, without receiving battle or opposition.

== Partners and children ==
- - Donell
- - Teige Ó Flaithbheartaigh - Father of Brian na Samthach Ó Flaithbheartaigh
- - Edmund
- - Rory Sheoghe - eldest surviving son and main heir, alive 1593.
- - Hugh Dubh
- - Maonach
- - Donell Ruadh
- - Brian an Chobhlaigh
- - Morogh Oge
- - Urumhan
- - Mortagh
- - Donell
- - Margaret, who married (the legality of the marriage was disputed) Laurence Esmonde, 1st Baron Esmonde, and was the mother of Sir Thomas Esmonde, first of the Esmonde baronets, (he did not inherit his father's peerage).

Preceded by Domnell Crone Ó Flaithbheartaigh	Chief of the Iar Connacht; 1560–1593	Succeeded by ?
