= Donn mac Cumasgach =

King of Maigh Seola

Donn mac Cumasgach was a king of Maigh Seóla who died in 752.

He may be the earliest recorded ruler of Maigh Seóla, as he is referred to as King of the Uí Briúin of the South in the annals' obit. In the Leabhar na nGenealach, he is stated to be the great-grandson of Cenn Fáelad mac Colgan and the father of Coscrach Mór, the eponym of the Clann Cosgraigh. The Annals of Ulster place his killing sub anno 757, but do not name his killer.

The king-list of Maigh Seóla is difficult to reassemble due to its royal line's sporadic annalistic appearances. However, Connmhach Mór mac Coscraigh—apparently Donn's grandson through the Coscrach Mór mac Duinn in the Leabhar na nGenealach line—is the next king of the region mentioned in the annals. Connmhach appears as the victor at the Battle of Drung in 836 and in his obit is described as "King of Uí Briúin", though he was himself also king of Hy Briuin Seola.
