= Donnchadh mac Urchadh =

Donnchadh mac Urchadh (died 959) was the King of Maigh Seóla.

Nothing certain seems to be known about Donnchadh, Although he is believed to have been an uncle of Brian Boru. He is not listed in the genealogies.

Preceded by Urchadh mac Murchadh	King of Maigh Seóla; 943–959	Succeeded by Murchad mac Flann mac Glethneachan
