= Edward McHugh (artist) =

Edward McHugh (born 1969) is an American artist from Philadelphia whose work includes photography and sculpture.

== Education and work ==
McHugh trained as a painter, printmaker, and sculptor, graduating from the Hussian School of Art in Philadelphia in 1991. He later studied at Crown Point Press in San Francisco.

McHugh applies a thin layer of archival wax to the surface of photographic prints, using a painterly brushstroke, giving it a handmade surface. The Seattle Times described an image of the battleship USS New Jersey treated with this technique, saying that "the effect is both enchanting and unsettling".

== Exhibitions ==
- Sans Titre, Boulder Museum of Contemporary Art, Boulder, Colorado, 1999
- Altered Photo, Center on Contemporary Art, Seattle, 2010
- American Photography X2, Towson University, Towson, Maryland, 2013/14
