= Muireadhach ua Flaithbheartach =

11th century king of Maigh Seóla, Ireland

Muireadhach ua Flaithbheartach, also known as Murchadh an Chapail Ua Flaithbheartaigh (died 1034-6), was King of Maigh Seóla.

== Biography ==
The Annals of Inisfallen state 1027 - Muiredach Ua Flaithbertaig besieged Cathal, son of Ruaidrí, on Inis Crema in Loch Oirbsen, and divided his land despite him.

The Chronicon Scotorum states Muiredhach ua Flaitbertaigh king of the Ua mBriuin Sheola was treacherously killed.

Muireadhach was a grandson of Flaithbheartach, hence his suffix, which would become the surname Ua/Ó Flaithbheartaigh/O'Flaherty. The genealogies name his father as Maelcairearda; a person of this name died in 993, listed a king of Uí Briúin, but not explicitly as king of Uí Briúin Seóla. He is listed as having three sons – Ruaidhrí of Lough Cimbe, Donagh Aluinn and Aedh. From Ruaidhrí and Donagh would descended the eastern and western Ó Flaithbheartaigh's of Connemara.

Preceded by Brian mac Maelruanaidh	King of Maigh Seóla; 1003?–1034	Succeeded by Cathal mac Ruaidhri

== See also ==
- Ó Flaithbertaigh
