= Clann Cosgraigh =

Clann Cosgraigh or Clann Coscraig was a branch of the Uí Briúin Seóla and also the name of the district on the eastern side of Lough Corrib, County Galway in which they lived and had authority before the Normans came.

The eponym of the lineage was Coscrach Mór mac Duinn, who died in the Battle of Dún Ganiba in 799. Its chiefs were the Meic Áeda (now rendered McHugh or McGagh, via Mac Aodha), who, like the Muintir Murchada, claimed descent from Cenn Fáelad mac Colgan, King of Connacht. Early generations of the lineage competed with the Muintir Murchada and Uí Fiachrach Aidhne for the kingship of South Connacht.

== See also ==
- Donn mac Cumasgach
- Ruaidhrí mac Coscraigh
- Cosgrove (disambiguation)
