= Maigh Seóla =

Ancient territory in County Galway, Ireland

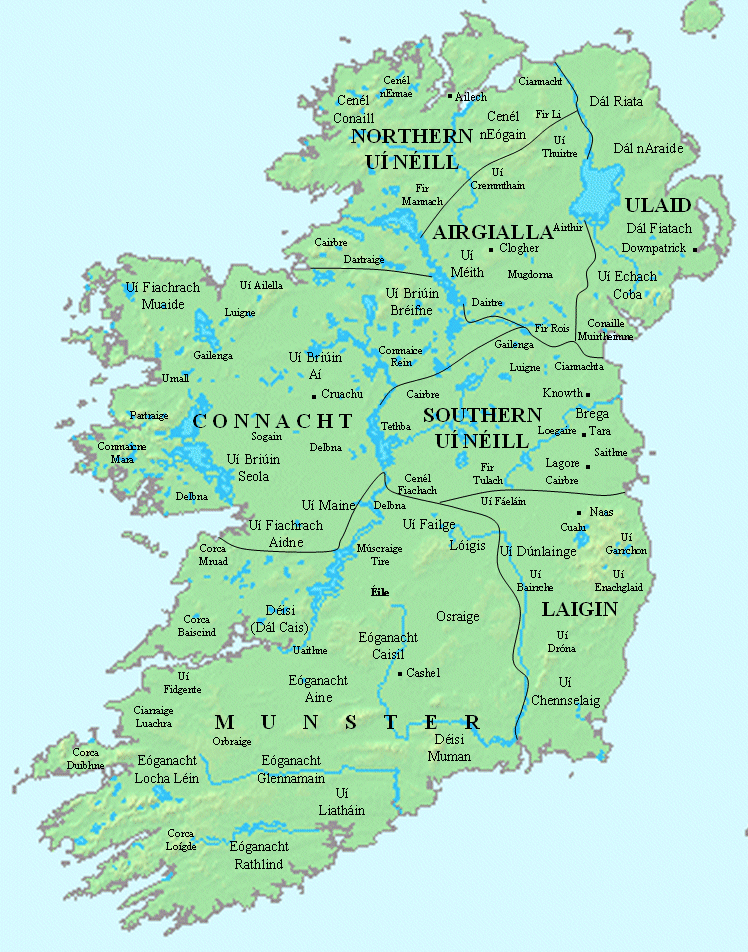
Early peoples and kingdoms of Ireland, c.800

Maigh Seóla (Irish pronunciation: [mˠəi ˈʃoːl̪ˠə]), also known as Hy Briuin Seola, was the territory that included land along the east shore of Lough Corrib in County Galway, Ireland. It was bounded to the east by the Uí Maine vassal kingdom of Soghain, extending roughly from Lough Corrib east to Knockma Hill and from Clarinbridge north to the County Mayo border. Its rulers belonged to the Uí Briúin Seóla and are sometimes found in the annals under the title "King of Uí Briúin" and "King of South Connacht". The earliest identifiable kings belonged to the line that became the Clann Cosgraigh. However, in later times the line which would become the Muintir Murchada, under the O'Flaherty chiefs, monopolized the kingship.

The Muintir Murchada were based at Loch Cime (later called Lough Hackett) until forced west of Lough Corrib during the de Burgo led English invasion of Connacht in the 13th century. According to the 17th-century historian Ruaidhrí Ó Flaithbheartaigh, Maigh Seóla was considered part of Iar Connacht prior to the 13th-century Anglo-Norman invasion of Connacht. After the de Burgo / Burke family became established in Maigh Seola the territorial term Iar Connacht was only used to denote the territory of the O'Flahertys west of Lough Corrib and Lough Mask.

In English, the plain of Maigh Seóla is also known as Moyola.

== Kings of Maigh Seóla ==
- Donn mac Cumasgach, died 752
- Connmhach Mór mac Coscraigh, died 846
- Maelan mac Cathmogha, died 848
- Murchadh mac Maenach, died 891
- Cléirchén mac Murchadh, died 908
- Urchadh mac Murchadh, died 943
- Donnchadh mac Urchadh, died 959
- Murchad mac Flann mac Glethneachan, died 973
- Ruaidhrí mac Coscraigh, died 992
- Maelcairearda, died 993
- Brian mac Maelruanaidh, died 1003
- Muireadhach ua Flaithbheartach, died 1034
- Murchadh an Chapail Ua Flaithbheartaigh, died 1036
- Cathal mac Ruaidhri, died 1043
- Amhalgaidh mac Cathal, died 1075

== Annalistic references ==
From the Annals of the Four Masters:

- M990.7 - The wind sunk the island of Loch Cimbe suddenly, with its dreach and rampart, i.e. thirty feet.

== See also ==
- Crichaireacht cinedach nduchasa Muintiri Murchada
- Clann Fhergail
- Uí Fiachrach Aidhne
- Clann Taidg
- Conmhaicne
- Delbhna Tir Dha Locha
- Muintir Murchada
- Nevin (surname)
- Senchineoil
- Uí Maine
- Soghain
- Trícha Máenmaige
- Uí Díarmata
- Cóiced Ol nEchmacht
- Síol Anmchadha
- Iar Connacht
- Cenél Áeda na hEchtge
