= Ó Flaithbheartaigh =

Family name

O'Flaherty Ó Flaithbheartaigh
- Parent house: Connachta (Uí Briúin Seóla)
- Country: Kingdom of Connacht
- Founder: Flaithbheartach mac Eimhin
- Final ruler: Domnell Crone Ó Flaithbheartaigh
- Historic seat: Aughnanure Castle
- Titles: King of Connacht; King of Iar Connacht; King of Maigh Seóla; King of Muintir Murchada; Governor of Dun Gallimhe
- Cadet branches: McDonough

O'Flaherty (/oʊˈflɛərti, oʊˈflæhərti/ oh-FLAIR-tee, oh-FLA-hər-tee, UK also /oʊˈflɑːərti/ oh-FLAH-ər-tee; Middle Irish: Ua Flaithbertaig; Modern Irish: Ó Flaithbheartaigh [oː ˈfˠlˠahəɾˠt̪ˠəj]) is an Irish Gaelic clan based most prominently in what has become County Galway. The clan name originated in the 10th century as a derivative of its founder Flaithbheartach mac Eimhin. They descend in the paternal line from the Connachta's Uí Briúin Seóla. They were originally kings of Maigh Seóla and Muintir Murchada and as members of the Uí Briúin were kinsmen of the Ó Conchubhair and Mac Diarmada amongst others. After their king Cathal mac Tigernán lost out to Áed in Gai Bernaig in the 11th century, the family were pushed further west to Iar Connacht, a territory associated with Connemara. They continued to rule this land until the 16th century. The name has been alternatively rendered into English in various forms, such as Flaherty, Fluharty, Faherty, Laverty, Flaverty, Lahiff, Lafferty and Flahive.

== Naming conventions ==
Male	Daughter (Long)	Daughter (Short)	Wife (Long)	Wife (Short)
Ó Flaithbheartaigh	Iníon Uí Fhlaithbheartaigh	Ní Fhlaithbheartaigh	Bean Uí Fhlaithbheartaigh	Uí Fhlaithbheartaigh
Ó Flaithearta	Iníon Uí Fhlaithearta	Ní Fhlaithearta	Bean Uí Fhlaithearta	Uí Fhlaithearta

== Overview ==
This Gaelic-Irish surname is written as "Ua Flaithbertach" (nominative) or "Ua Flaithbertaig" (genitive) in Old Irish and Middle Irish texts. In Modern Irish the surname is generally spelt as Ó Flatharta.

The surname is commonly translated as "bright ruler" or more correctly "bright prince", flaith originally meaning prince in Irish. "O" or Ó comes from Ua, designating "grandson" or "descendant" of a (major) clan member. The prefix is often anglicised to O', using an apostrophe instead of the Irish síneadh fada.

According to historian C. Thomas Cairney, the O'Flahertys were a sept of the Uí Briúin tribe who in turn were a tribe of the Connachta who in turn were from the Gaels, the fourth and final wave of Celtic settlement in Ireland which took place during the first century BC.

Maigh Seóla was the earliest O'Flaherty domain, to the east of Lough Corrib in the kingdom of Connacht, the westernmost province of the Island of Ireland (Irish: Éire).

The Ó Flaithbertaighs are a branch of the Muintir Murchada dynasty, named after Murchadh mac Maenach (died 891), King of the Uí Briúin Seóla. Murchadh is one of the earliest attested kings of his region. The leading family of this dynasty would take the surname Ó Flaithbheartaigh (O'Flaherty) from the 11th century onwards.

== Kings of Magh Seóla ==
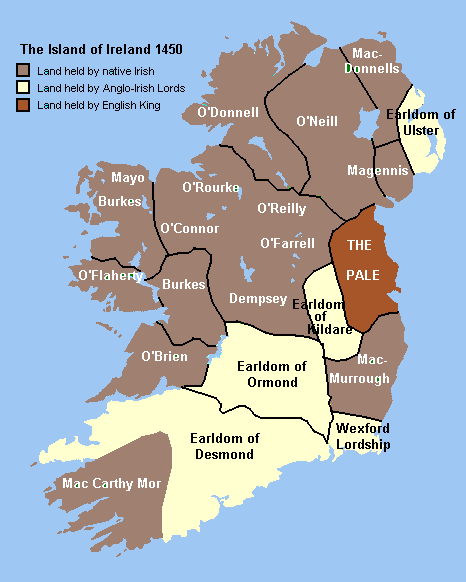
Ireland in 1450

The Uí Briúin Seóla was one of the major branches of the powerful Uí Briúin dynasty, which had become the dominant force in Connacht by the 8th century. The genealogies list two sons of Murchadh mac Maenach: Urchadh and Urumhain. Urchadh mac Murchadh, King of Maigh Seóla (also listed as king of Iarthair Connacht, died 945, in the 14th century Book of Ballymote) was father of Bé Binn inion Urchadh, Princess of the Uí Briúin Seóla and Queen of Thomond (fl. early 10th century). Bé Binn married Cennétig mac Lorcáin of Thomond to produce a son who would become the High King of Ireland (Irish: Ard-Rí na hÉireann): Brian Bóruma mac Cennétig, known in English as Brian Boru (c. 941–23 April 1014). Brian broke the near monopoly of the Uí Néill over the High Kingship of Ireland and fought to unite Ireland as a people under one, native king. His father, Cennétig mac Lorcáin of Thomond, was one of the principal leaders of the resistance to the Danish Viking incursions. Cennétig had several wives and children but positively assigned Bé Binn as the mother of Brian Bóruma.

Bé Binn's sister Creassa inion Urchadh was a wife of King Tadg mac Cathail of Connacht, while her sister, Caineach inion Urchadh, married the ancestor of the Clann Coscraig sept of the Uí Briúin Seóla. Her brother, Donnchadh mac Urchadh succeeded their father as King of Maigh Seóla (943–959).

Like the Uí Briúin Seóla, the Uí Briúin Ai were a major branch of the Uí Briúin dynasty, from whom the high medieval Ua Conchobair (O'Connor) kings of Connacht, including the last high king of Ireland, Ruaidrí Ua Conchobair, were descended.

The Ó Flaithbertaigh family line and kingship can be traced back to Brión mac Echach Muigmedóin, King of Connacht, who was the half-brother of Niall of the Nine Hostages. Their father, Eochaid Muigh Meadhoin mac Muiredach, was, according to legend, also 122nd High King of Ireland and was a direct descendant of Galamh Milesius (c. 1763 BCE – c. 1699 BCE). Galamh Milesius's bloodline produced kings in succession for over 3,000 years. Kingship was passed on to direct descendants only starting with Érimón mac Míl Espáine, 2nd High King of Ireland son of Galamh Milisius.

== The first Ó Flaithbertaighs ==
In Connacht the first to bear the name was Muireadhach ua Flaithbheartach, king of Maigh Seóla, who died in 1034. He is listed as having three sons – Ruaidhrí of Lough Cimbe, Donagh Aluinn and Aedh. From Ruaidhrí and Donagh would descend the O'Flahertys of East and West Connemara.

== Exiled by the Kings of Connacht ==
In the Annals of the Four Masters, Rúaidhri Ua Flaithbheartaigh, King of Iar Connacht, is described as dying at the battle of Glen Patrick in 1061 (Book of Ballymote: died 1062). The Annals state:

- Maidhm Glinne Pattraicc ria n-Aodh Ua Conchobhair for Iarthair Connacht, in ro mudhaighith ile im Ruaidhri Ua Flaithbheartaigh, tigherna Iarthair Connacht, & ro dicendadh é, & ruccadh a ceann co Cruachain Chonnacht iar sraoineadh for mac Aodha mic Ruaidhri./The victory of Gleann-Phadraig was gained by Aedh Ua Conchobhair over the people of Iar Connacht (West Connacht), where many were slain, together with Ruaidhri. O'Flaithbheartaigh, lord of Iar Connacht, was beheaded, and his head was carried to Cruachain in Connacht, after the son of Aedh, son of Ruaidhri, had been defeated.

The following year records that Tadhg, son of Aedh Ua Conchobhair (O'Connor), was "slain by the son of Aedh, son of Ruaidhri (ie O'Flahertys), and the people of Iar Connacht." From this point on, the family were forced into Iar Connacht, as the Kings of Connacht took the original Ua Flaithbheartaigh homeland for themselves.

Aedh Ua Flaithbheartaigh, (King of Iar Connacht, died 1079) was the third bearer of the surname Ua Flaithbheartaigh to rule over the Muintir Murchada. Aedh was killed in 1079 by Ruaidrí na Saide Buide (Ruaidrí Ua Conchobair, anglicised Roderic O'Connor, died 1118), who in turn was blinded by Flaithbertaigh Ua Flaithbertaigh (Flaherty O'Flaherty), King of Iar Connacht, in 1092.

== Flaithbertaigh Ua Flaithbertaigh, King of Connacht ==
Crichaireacht cinedach nduchasa Muintiri Murchada is a tract listing the main families and their estates of the Muintir Murchada in the reign of its lord, Flaithbertaigh Ua Flaithbertaigh, who was king of Iar Connacht from 1091 until his death in 1098. He seized the kingship of Connacht in 1092 by blinding the Godfather of his children, King Ruaidrí na Saide Buide. He was killed by Ruaidrí's sons in 1098.

== Kings of Iar Connacht ==
The subsequent king of Iar Connacht, Muireadhach Ua Flaithbheartaigh (died 1121), and his descendants, remained loyal to the Ó Conchobair's.

Before the close of the 13th century, the Chiefs of Clan Ó Flaithbertaigh became Lords of Iar Connacht, extending from the western banks of Lough Corrib to the shores of the Atlantic. In the 1230s, the Hiberno-Normans came and took Galway. Gaels were forbidden even from entering the city walls. In the 16th-century, the Ó Flaithbertaigh built a tower house called Aughnanure Castle, which was featured on an Irish stamp and became a National Monument and tourist destination, managed by the Office of Public Works.

== Motto and coat of arms ==
The clan motto is Fortuna Favet Fortibus, or "Fortune Favours the Brave" which may have been inspired by the same line in Virgil's Aeneid. The Ó Flaithbertaigh coat of arms depicts "two red lizards or dragons rampant combatant, supporting a red dexter hand, couped at the wrists, in base a black boat with eight oars". The two red lizards or dragons are often confused with the lions of the English heraldic tradition. Often a grey or green salamander is depicted on a black or grey helmet above the coat of arms.

However, there is little known of Irish heraldic tradition as compared to that of the English although Irish use of distinctive flags and banners in battle is recorded in Irish annals such as the Annals of the Four Masters.

== Notable Ó Flaithbertaighs ==
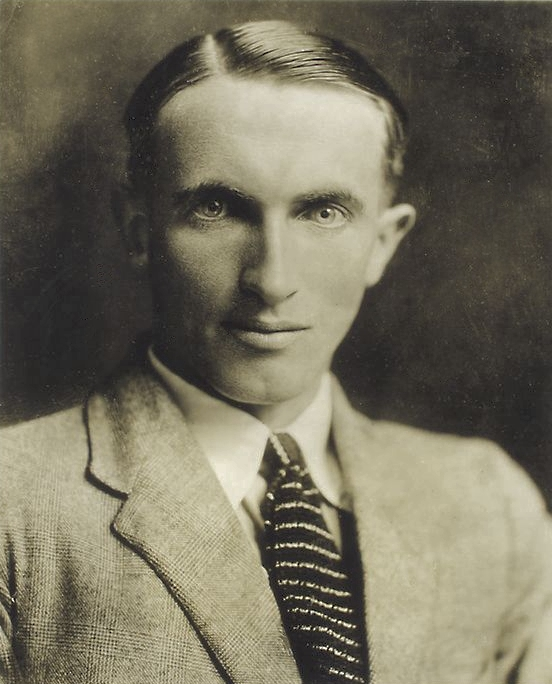
Liam Ó Flaithearta.

- Muireadhach ua Flaithbheartach, King of Maigh Seóla, died 1034.
- Murchadh an Chapail Ua Flaithbheartaigh, King of Maigh Seóla/Iar Connacht, died 1036.
- Rúaidhri Ua Flaithbheartaigh, King of Iar Connacht, died 1061.
- Flaithbertaigh Ua Flaithbertaigh, King of Connacht, died 1098.
- Conchobhar Ua Flaithbheartaigh, King of Iar Connacht, died 1132.
- Áedh Mór Ó Flaithbheartaigh, died 1236.
- Murchad Ua Flaithbertaig, Bishop of Annaghdown, c. 1202–1241.
- Morogh Ó Flaithbheartaigh, King of Iar Connacht and Chief of the Name, fl. 1244.
- Ruaidhri Ó Flaithbheartaigh, King of Iar Connacht and Chief of the Name, fl. 1244–1273.
- Áedh Ó Flaithbheartaigh, Taoiseach of Iar Connacht and Chief of the Name, fl. c. 1377?–1407.
- Dónal "an Chogaidh" Ó Flaithbheartaigh (Donal of the Battle), also known as Donall an Cullagh (The Cock). Married to Grace O'Malley ("Granuaile"), and tanist to the Ó Flaithbheartaigh title.
- Murrough na dTuadh Ó Flaithbheartaigh, Chief of the Name, died 1593.
- Teige Ó Flaithbheartaigh, warlord, died 1589.
- Maidhc Ó Flaithearta, member of the Irish National Land League, fl. 1882.
- Oscar Fingal O'Flahertie Wills Wilde 16 October 1854 – 30 November 1900, Irish writer and poet
- Tom Sailí Ó Flaithearta, actor
- Maire Eilis Ní Fhlaithearta, actress and former model.
- Fionnuala Ní Fhlatharta, actress, Ros na Rún.

== See also ==
- O'Flaherty, a list of people with the surname
- Flaherty, a list of people with the surname
- Crichaireacht cinedach nduchasa Muintiri Murchada
- Toombeola
- Ó Laithbheartaigh
- Irish clans
