= Donn Cothaid mac Cathail =

Donn Cothaid mac Cathail, King of Connacht, died 773.

Donn Cothaid was a King of Connacht from the Ui Fiachrach Muaidhe branch of the Connachta. He was the great-grandson of Dúnchad Muirisci mac Tipraite (died 683). He was the last member of this branch to hold the throne of Connacht and ruled from 768 to 773.

== Descendants ==
Donn Cothaid's son, Connmhach mac Duinn Cothaid (died 787), was a later king of the Ui Fiachrach. A grandson, Dubda mac Conmac, was the grandfather of Aed Ua Dubhda, eponym and ancestor of the O'Dowd Chiefs of the Name.

== Family tree ==
Fidach, King of Munster	See Connachta
Crimthann mac Fidaig; King of Munster and High King of Ireland	Mongfind	Eochaid Mugmedon	Cairenn
Brion	Fiachrae	Ailill	Niall Noígíallach, died c.450.
See Uí Briúin	(Uí Fiachrach)	See Uí nAilello	See Uí Néill
Amalgaid; King of Connacht	Nath Í King of Connacht	Macc Ercae
Fiachnae	Ailill Molt, d.482. King of Connacht and probably High King of Ireland	Echu
(Uí Fiachrach Muaidhe)	See Uí Fiachrach Aidhne
Elgach	?
Maeldubh	Eógan Bél; King of Connacht
Tipraite	Ailill Inbanda; King of Connacht
Dúnchad Muirisci; King of Connacht
Indrechtach, d.707 King of Connacht	Ailill
Ailill Medraige, d.764 King of Connacht	Cathal
Cathal, d.816	Donn Cothaid mac Cathail, d.787
Connmhach
Caomhán	Dubda

== See also ==
- Kings of Connacht
