= Máel Cothaid mac Máele Umai =

Máel Cothaid mac Máele Umai (flourished 601) was a King of Connacht from the Uí Fiachrach branch of the Connachta. He was of the Fir Chera sept of this branch and was the grandson of Feradach mac Ross (died c.557), a previous Connacht king. The king lists such as the Book of Leinster have placed his reign after his grandfathers and before Áed mac Echach Tirmcharna (died 575) and give him a reign of three years. Prof. Byrne has placed him after Uatu mac Áedo (died 600).

In 601 was fought the Battle of Echros (Aughris Head) where he suffered a defeat at the hands of the Cenél Coirpri led by Colman. This was part of the perennial feud between the Connachta and the northern Ui Neill for control of the strategic route through County Sligo. Mael Cothaid is only mentioned as king of the Uí Fiachrach in reference to this battle in the annals. His defeat may have contributed to the failure of his line to maintain their hold on the Moy estuary and his branch is found later in Carra, County Mayo and provided no further kings of Connaught.

== See also ==
- List of kings of Connacht
