= Finsnechta mac Tommaltaig =

Finsnechta mac Tommaltaig (died 848), was one of the sons of Tommaltach mac Murgail, and King of Connacht from 843–848. Finsnechta mac Tommaltaig succeeded to the throne of the Connachta in 843 after the death of Fergus mac Fothaid grandson of Dub-Indrecht mac Cathail and was succeeded by Mugron mac Máel Cothaid. He was also brother to Muirgius mac Tommaltaig and Diarmait mac Tommaltaig.

Preceded by Fergus mac Fothaid	King of Connacht; 843–848	Succeeded by Mugron mac Máel Cothaid
