= Feradach mac Ross =

Feradech mac Ross (died c. 557) was a King of Connacht from the Ui Fiachrach branch of the Connachta. He was of the Fir Chera sept of this branch descended from Macc Ercae, a son of Fiachra, the ancestor of the Ui Fiachrach. Feradech was the great-grandson of this Macc Ercae.

Not mentioned in the annals as king, he is however listed in king lists such as the Book of Leinster which gives him a reign of three years after Echu Tirmcharna mac Fergusso (d.556?). Francis J. Byrne places his reign between Echu Tirmcharna and Áed mac Echach (d. 575) who acceded to the throne in 557. In A poem on the Kings of Connaught he is called the fair and a true judge.

His son Máel Umai was father of a later king Máel Cothaid mac Máele Umai (flourished 601).

== See also ==
- Kings of Connacht
