= List of kings of Connacht =

Kings of Connacht
- Rí Chonnacht
- Map of Connacht, c. 10th century.

Details
- Style: Rí Chonnacht
- First monarch: Genann
- Last monarch: Feidhlimidh Geangcach Ó Conchobair
- Formed: Ancient
- Abolished: 1474
- Residences: Rathcroghan; Carnfree
- Appointer: Tanistry
- Pretenders: Desmond O'Conor Don (Ó Conchubhair Donn)

The Kings of Connacht were rulers of the cóiced (variously translated as portion, fifth, province) of Connacht, which lies west of the River Shannon, Ireland. However, the name only became applied to it in the early medieval era, being named after the Connachta.

The old name for the province was Cóiced Ol nEchmacht (the fifth of the Ol nEchmacht). Ptolemy's map of c. 150 AD does in fact list a people called the Nagnatae as living in the west of Ireland. Some are of the opinion that Ptolemy's Map of Ireland may be based on cartography carried out as much as five hundred years before his time.

The Connachta were a group of dynasties who claimed descent from the three eldest sons of Eochaid Mugmedon: Brion, Ailill and Fiachrae. They took their collective name from their alleged descent from Conn Cétchathach. Their younger brother, Niall Noigiallach was ancestor to the Uí Néill.

The following is a list of kings of Connacht from the fifth to fifteenth centuries.

== Prehistoric kings of Ol nEchmacht ==
- Genann
- Conrac Cas
- Eochaid Feidlech
- Eochaidh Allat
- Tinni mac Conri
- Medb, Queen of Connacht
- Medb and Ailill mac Máta
- Maine Aithreamhail mac Ailill Máta
- Sanbh Sithcheann mac Ceat mac Magha
- Cairbre mac Maine Aithreamhail
- Eochaidh Fionn
- Aodh mac Cu Odhar
- Eochaidh mac Cairbre
- Aonghus Fionn mac Domhnall
- Cormac Ulfhada
- Aonghus Feirt mac Aonghus Fionn
- Connall Cruchain mac Aonghus Feirt
- Fearadach mac Connal Cruchain
- Forghus Fiansa
- Forghus Fiansa and Art mac Conn
- Ceidghin Cruchain mac Connall Cruchain
- Aodh mac Eochaidh
- Aodh Alainn mac Eochaidh Baicidh
- Nia Mór mac Lughna
- Lughaidh mac Lughna Fear Tri
- Aodh Caomh mac Garadh Glundubh
- Coinne mac Fear Tri
- Muireadh Tireach mac Fiachra Sraibrintne
- Eochaid Mugmedon
- Niall Noigiallach/Niall of the Nine Hostages, died c. 450/455

== List of historical kings ==
=== Uí Fiachrach, 406–482 ===
Name	Reign	Clan Arms	Parentage	Death
Amalgaid mac Fiachrae	406–440		Son of Fiachrae	440
Nath Í mac Fiachrach	440–445		Son of Fiachrae	445
Ailill Molt	445–482		Son of Nath Í mac Fiachrach	482

=== Uí Briúin, 482–500 ===
Name	Reign	Clan Arms	Parentage	Death
Dauí Tenga Uma	482–500		Son of Brión mac Echach Muigmedóin	500

=== Uí Fiachrach, 500–549 ===
Name	Reign	Clan Arms	Parentage	Death
Eógan Bél	500–542		Son of Cellaig, the son of Ailill Molt	542
Ailill Inbanda	542–549		Son of Eógan Bél	549

=== Uí Briúin, 549–600 ===
Name	Reign	Clan Arms	Parentage	Death
Echu Tirmcharna	549–556		Son of Fergus mac Muireadach	556
Áed mac Echach	556–575		Son of Echu Tirmcharna	575
Uatu mac Áedo	575–600		Son of Áed mac Echach	600

=== Uí Fiachrach Aidhne, 600–622 ===
Name	Reign	Clan Arms	Parentage	Death
Colmán mac Cobthaig	600–622		Son of Cobthach mac Gabran	622

=== Uí Briúin, 622–649 ===
Name	Reign	Clan Arms	Parentage	Death
Rogallach mac Uatach	622–649		Son of Uatu mac Áedo	649

=== Uí Fiachrach Aidhne, 649–663 ===
Name	Reign	Clan Arms	Parentage	Death
Loingsech mac Colmáin	649–655		Son of Colmán mac Cobthaig	655
Guaire Aidne mac Colmáin	655–663		Son of Colmán mac Cobthaig	663

=== Uí Briúin Seóla, 663–682 ===
Name	Reign	Clan Arms	Parentage	Death
Cenn Fáelad mac Colgan	663–682		Son of Colga mac Aodha	682

=== Uí Fiachrach Muaidhe, 682–683 ===
Name	Reign	Clan Arms	Parentage	Death
Dúnchad Muirisci	682–683		Son of Tipraite mac Máel Dubh	683

=== Uí Fiachrach Aidhne, 683–696 ===
Name	Reign	Clan Arms	Parentage	Death
Fergal Aidne mac Artgaile	683–696		Son of Artgal mac Guaire	696

=== Uí Briúin Síl Muiredaig, 696–702 ===
Name	Reign	Clan Arms	Parentage	Death
Muiredach Muillethan	696–702		Son of Fergus mac Rogallaig	702

=== Uí Briúin Síl Cellaig, 702–705 ===
King	Clan sept	Reign
Cellach mac Rogallach mac Uatach	Uí Briúin	702–705

=== Uí Fiachrach Muaidhe, 705–707 ===
Name	Reign	Clan Arms	Parentage	Death
Indrechtach mac Dúnchado	705–707		Son of Dúnchad Muirisci	707

=== Uí Briúin Síl Muiredaig, 707–723 ===
Name	Reign	Clan Arms	Parentage	Death
Indrechtach mac Muiredaig	707–723		Son of Muiredach Muillethan	723

=== Uí Briúin Síl Cellaig, 723–728 ===
King	Clan sept	Reign
Domnall mac Cellaig mac Rogallach	Uí Briúin Síl Cellaig	723–728

=== Uí Briúin Síl Cathail, 728–735 ===
Name	Reign	Clan Arms	Parentage	Death
Cathal mac Muiredaig	728–735		Son of Muiredach Muillethan	735

=== Uí Briúin Síl Muiredaig, 735–742 ===
Name	Reign	Clan Arms	Parentage	Death
Áed Balb mac Indrechtaig	735–742		Son of Indrechtach mac Muiredaig	742

=== Uí Briúin Síl Cellaig, 742–756 ===
King	Clan sept	Reign
Forggus mac Cellaig	Uí Briúin Síl Cellaig	742–756

=== Uí Fiachrach Muaidhe, 756–764 ===
Name	Reign	Clan Arms	Parentage	Death
Ailill Medraige mac Indrechtaig	756–764		Son of Indrechtach mac Dúnchado	764

=== Uí Briúin Síl Cathail, 764–768 ===
Name	Reign	Clan Arms	Parentage	Death
Dub-Indrecht mac Cathail	764–768		Son of Cathal mac Muiredaig	768

=== Uí Fiachrach Muaidhe, 768–773 ===
Name	Reign	Clan Arms	Parentage	Death
Donn Cothaid mac Cathail	768–773		Son of Cathal mac Ailill Medraige	773

=== Uí Briúin Síl Cellaig, 773–777 ===
King	Clan sept	Reign
Flaithrí mac Domnaill	Uí Briúin Síl Cellaig	773–777

=== Uí Briúin Síl Cathail, 777–782 ===
Name	Reign	Clan Arms	Parentage	Death
Artgal mac Cathail	777–782		Son of Cathal mac Muiredaig	782

=== Uí Briúin Síl Muiredaig, 782–786 ===
Name	Reign	Clan Arms	Parentage	Death
Tipraite mac Taidg	782–786		Son of Tadhg mac Indrechtach	786

=== Uí Briúin Síl Cathail, 786–792 ===
Name	Reign	Clan Arms	Parentage	Death
Cináed mac Artgail	786–792		Son of Artgal mac Cathail	792

=== Uí Briúin Síl Cellaig, 792–796 ===
King	Clan sept	Reign
Colla mac Fergusso	Uí Briúin Síl Cellaig	792–796

=== Uí Briúin Síl Muiredaig, 796–839 ===
Name	Reign	Clan Arms	Parentage	Death
Muirgius mac Tommaltach	796–815		Son of Tommaltach mac Murgail	815
Diarmait mac Tommaltaig	815–833		Son of Tommaltach mac Murgail	833
Cathal mac Muirgiussa	833–839		Son of Muirgius mac Tommaltaig	839

=== Uí Briúin Síl Cathail, 839–843 ===
Name	Reign	Clan Arms	Parentage	Death
Murchad mac Áedo	839–840		Son of Aedh mac Fogartach	840
Fergus mac Fothaid	840–843		Son of Fothaid mac Dub-Indrecht	843

=== Uí Briúin Síl Muiredaig, 843–848 ===
Name	Reign	Clan Arms	Parentage	Death
Finsnechta mac Tommaltaig	843–848		Son of Tommaltach mac Murgail	848

=== Uí Briúin Síl Cathail, 848–872 ===
Name	Reign	Clan Arms	Parentage	Death
Mugron mac Máel Cothaid	848–872		Son of Máel Cothaid mac Fogartaig	872

=== Uí Briúin Síl Muiredaig, 872–956 ===
Name	Reign	Clan Arms	Parentage	Death
Conchobar mac Taidg Mór	872–882		Son of Tadhg Mór mac Muirgius	882
Áed mac Conchobair	882–888		Son of Conchobar mac Taidg Mór	888
Tadg mac Conchobair	888–900		Son of Conchobar mac Taidg Mór	900
Cathal mac Conchobair	900–925		Son of Conchobar mac Taidg Mór	925
Tadg mac Cathail	925–956		Son of Cathal mac Conchobair	956

=== Ó Ruairc, 956–967 ===
Name	Reign	Clan Arms	Parentage	Death
Fergal Ua Ruairc	956–967		Son of Art mac Ruarc	967

=== Ó Conchobhair, 967–1030 ===
Name	Reign	Clan Arms	Parentage	Death
Conchobar mac Tadg	967–973		Son of Tadg mac Cathail	973
Cathal mac Tadg	973		Son of Tadg mac Cathail	973
Cathal mac Conchobar mac Taidg	973–1010		Son of Conchobar mac Tadg	1010
Tadg in Eich Gil	1010–1030		Son of Cathal mac Conchobar mac Taidg	1030

=== Ó Ruairc, 1030–1046 ===
Name	Reign	Clan Arms	Parentage	Death
Art Uallach Ua Ruairc	1030–1046		Son of Aedh mac Fergal	1046

=== Ó Conchobhair, 1046–1067 ===
Name	Reign	Clan Arms	Parentage	Death
Áed in Gai Bernaig	1046–1067		Son of Tadg in Eich Gil	1067

=== Ó Ruairc, 1067–1087 ===
Name	Reign	Clan Arms	Parentage	Death
Áed Ua Ruairc	1067–1087		Son of Art Uallach mac Aedh	1087

=== Ó Conchobhair, 1087–1092 ===
Name	Reign	Clan Arms	Parentage	Death
Ruaidrí na Saide Buide	1087–1092		Son of Áed in Gai Bernaig	1092

=== Ó Flaithbheartaigh, 1092–1095 ===
Name	Reign	Clan Arms	Parentage	Death
Flaithbertaigh Ua Flaithbertaigh	1092–1095		Son of Mac meic Aedh Ua Flaithbheartaigh	1098

=== Ó Conchobhair, 1092–1097 ===
Name	Reign	Clan Arms	Parentage	Death
Tadg mac Ruaidrí Ua Conchobair	1092–1097		Son of Ruaidrí na Saide Buide and Mór Ní Briain	1097

=== Ó Ruairc, 1097–1102 ===
Name	Reign	Clan Arms	Parentage	Death
Domnall Ua Ruairc	1097–1102		Son of Tigernán mac Ualgharg	1102

=== Ó Conchobhair, 1102–1280 ===
Name	Reign	Clan Arms	Parentage	Death
Domnall Ua Conchobair	1102–1106		Son of Ruaidrí na Saide Buide and Mór Ní Briain	1106
Tairrdelbach Ua Conchobair	1106–1156		Son of Ruaidrí na Saide Buide and Mór Ní Briain	1156
Ruaidrí Ua Conchobair	1156–1186		Son of Tairrdelbach Ua Conchobair	1198
Conchobar Máenmaige Ua Conchobhair	1186–1189		Son of Ruaidrí Ua Conchobair	1189
Cathal Carragh Ua Conchobhair	1190–1202		Son of Conchobar Maenmaige Ua Conchobair	1202
Cathal Crobderg Ua Conchobair	1202–1224		Son of Tairrdelbach Ua Conchobair	1224
Aedh Ua Conchobair	1224–1228		Son of Cathal Crobderg Ua Conchobair	1228
Aedh mac Ruaidri Ua Conchobair	1228–1233		Son of Ruaidrí Ua Conchobair	1233
Felim mac Cathal Crobderg Ua Conchobair	1233–1265		Son of Cathal Crobderg Ua Conchobair	1265
Aedh mac Felim Ó Conchobair	1265–1274		Son of Felim Ua Conchobair	1274
Aedh Muimhnech Ó Conchobair	1274–1280		Son of Felim Ua Conchobair	1280

=== Muircheartaigh Uí Conchobhair, 1280–1293 ===
Name	Reign	Clan Arms	Parentage	Death
Cathal Ó Conchobair	1280–1288; 1293		Son of Conchobair Ruadh mac Muirchertaig Ó Conchobair	1293
Maghnus Ó Conchobair	1288–1293		Son of Conchobair Ruadh mac Muirchertaig Ó Conchobair	1293

=== Ó Conchobhair, 1293–1309 ===
Name	Reign	Clan Arms	Parentage	Death
Aedh Ó Conchobair	1293–1309		Son of Eoghan mac Ruaidri Ó Conchobair	1309

=== Muircheartaigh Uí Conchobhair, 1309–1310 ===
Name	Reign	Clan Arms	Parentage	Death
Ruaidri Ó Conchobair	1309–1310		Son of Cathal Ó Conchobair	1310

=== Ó Conchubhair Ruadh, 1310–1317 ===
Name	Reign	Clan Arms	Parentage	Death
Fedlim Ó Conchobair	1310–1316		Son of Aedh Ó Conchobair	1316

=== Ó Conchobhair, 1316–1317 ===
Name	Reign	Clan Arms	Parentage	Death
Ruaidri na bhFeadh Ó Conchobair	1316–1317		Son of Donnchadh mac Eoghan Ó Conchobair	unknown

=== Ó Conchubhair Donn, 1317–1350 ===
Name	Reign	Clan Arms	Parentage	Death
Toirdelbach Ó Conchobair	1317–1318; 1324–1350		Son of Aedh Ó Conchobair	1350
Aedh mac Tairdelbach Ó Conchobair	1324		Son of Toirdelbach Ó Conchobair	1345

=== Ó Conchobhair Sligigh, 1318–1324 ===
Name	Reign	Clan Arms	Parentage	Death
Cathal mac Domhnall Ó Conchobair	1318–1324		Son of Domnall mac Tadg Ó Conchobair	1324

=== Muircheartaigh Uí Conchobhair, 1342–1350 ===
Name	Reign	Clan Arms	Parentage	Death
Aedh mac Aedh Breifneach Ó Conchobair	1342–1350		Son of Aedh Breifneach mac Cathal Ó Conchobair	1350

=== Ó Conchubhair Donn, 1368–1474 ===
Name	Reign	Clan Arms	Parentage	Death
Ruaidri mac Tairdelbach Ó Conchobair	1368–1384		Son of Toirdelbach Ó Conchobair	1384
Toirdhealbhach Óg Donn Ó Conchobair	1384–1406		Son of Aedh mac Tairdelbach Ó Conchobair	9 December 1406
Cathal mac Ruaidri Ó Conchobair	1406–1439		Son of Ruaidri mac Tairdelbach Ó Conchobair	19 March 1439
Aedh mac Tairdelbach Óg Ó Conchobair	1439–1461		Son of Toirdhealbhach Óg Donn Ó Conchobair	15 May 1461
Fedlim Geancach Ó Conchobair	1461–1474		Son of Toirdhealbhach Óg Donn Ó Conchobair	1474

== See also ==
- List of High Kings of Ireland
- List of kings of Ulster
- List of kings of Leinster
- List of kings of Munster
- List of kings of Mide

== Sources ==
- Annals of the Four Masters, 1990 edition.
- The Annals of Connacht, A. Martin Freeman, 1944.
- Irish Kings and High Kings, Francis John Byrne, 1973.
- Leabhar Mor Genealach, Dubhaltach MacFhirbhisigh, ed. O'Muralie, 2004.
