= Ailill Medraige mac Indrechtaig =

Ailill Medraige mac Indrechtaig (died 764) was a King of Connacht from the Uí Fiachrach Muaidhe branch of the Connachta. He was the son of Indrechtach mac Dúnchado Muirisci (died 707), a previous king and grandson of Dúnchad Muirisci mac Tipraite (died 683). He was the first member of this branch since 707 to hold the Connacht throne which had been dominated by the Uí Briúin since that time. He reigned from 756 to 764.

His sobriquet Medraige implies that he was fostered by this tribe on the eastern shore of Galway Bay. His acquisition of the throne of the Uí Fiachrach branch would have occurred sometime after the death of Airechtach, another grandson of Dúnchad Muirisci, who died around 735.

In 758, he defeated the Uí Briun at the Battle of Druim Robaig (Dromrovay, S.Mayo Co.). As this was fought in the territory of the Fir Chera branch of the Uí Fiachrach, it appears that the Uí Briúin were on the offensive. Three sons of the previous Uí Briúin king Forggus mac Cellaig (died 756) were slain.

His son Cathal mac Aillelo (died 816) was a king of the Uí Fiachrach.

== See also ==
- Kings of Connacht
