= Cináed mac Artgail =

Cináed mac Artgaile (died 792) was a King of Connacht from the Uí Briúin branch of the Connachta. He was the son of Artgal mac Cathail (died 791), a previous king. He was of the Síl Cathail sept of the Ui Briun.

The succession to Tipraite mac Taidg after 786 appears disputed and the Ui Fiachrach Muaide and Ui Aillelo made attempts to assert themselves as well. Cinaed is also not mentioned as king in the king lists nor is he called king in the annals.

In 787 the Battle of Gola was fought between the Ui Fiachrach and Ui Briun in which the victory went to the Ui Fiachrach. However it was a pyrrhic victory as their king Cathmug mac Duinn Cothaid, son of Donn Cothaid mac Cathail (died 773) was slain as well as Dub-Díbeirg mac Cathail of the Ui Briun, the uncle of Cinaed. Also, in 787, the Ui Fiachrach Muaide slaughtered the Uí Briúin of Umall and slew their king Flathgal son of Flannabra.

In 788 the law of Saint Ciarán was put in force in Connacht. Another battle among the Connachta is reported in 789 at Druim Góise where Fogartach mac Cathail, another uncle of Cinaed was defeated and fled.

Meanwhile the Ui Aillelo slaughtered the Luigne at the Battle of Achad Ablae (in Corann barony) in 789 and in 790 won the Battle of Áth Rois over the Luigne and slew their overchief in 790.

In 792 Cinaed was defeated and slain by Muirgius mac Tommaltaig at the Battle of Sruth Cluana Argai (Cloonargid, Roscommon Co.) from which date the annals say Muirgius reign began.

== See also ==
- Kings of Connacht
