= Máel Cothaid mac Fogartaig =

Máel Cothaid mac Fogartaig(flour.818) was a possible King of Connacht from the Uí Briúin branch of the Connachta. He was the grandson of Cathal mac Muiredaig Muillethan(d.735), a previous king and nephew of Dub-Indrecht mac Cathail(d.768) and Artgal mac Cathail(d.791). He was of the Síl Cathail sept of the Ui Briun. His father Fogartach mac Cathail was defeated in a battle among the Connachta in 789 at Druim Góise during a time when the throne of Connacht was being contested.

The king lists such as the Book of Leinster do not mention him as king nor is he referred to as king in the annals. The only reference for him in the annals is where, in conjunction with Diarmait mac Tommaltaig(d.833), as chiefs of the Ui Briun, they defeated the Ui Maine at the Battle of Foráth in the territory of the Delbna Nuadat between the Suck and Shannon Rivers in 818. The king of the Ui Maine, Cathal mac Murchadh, was slain.

His son Mugron mac Máel Cothaid (d.872) was the last Sil Cathail king of Connacht.

== See also ==
- Kings of Connacht
