= Colmán mac Cobthaig =

Colmán mac Cobthaig (died 622) was a king of Connacht from the Ui Fiachrach. He was the first king of Connacht from the Ui Fiachrach Aidhne branch. This branch was descended from Eochu, the brother of Ailill Molt (died 484). According to the Book of Ballymote he was the grandson of Goibnenn mac Conaill (flor.537), the first Aidne king mentioned in the annals, but Rawlinson Genealogies name his grandfather as Gabrán.

He succeeded as king sometime after 601. Both the Book of Leinster and the Laud Synchronisms consider him the successor of Uatu mac Áedo (died 600) and give him a reign of 25 and 21 years respectively.

The annals report that in 622 was fought the Battle of Cennbag (Cambo, County Roscommon) where he was slain. He was defeated by his successor Rogallach mac Uatach (died 649) of the Uí Briúin branch.

His sons included: Laidgnen/Loingsech mac Colmáin (died 655) and Guaire Aidne mac Colmáin (died 663) future kings of Connacht.

== See also ==
- Kings of Connacht
- Kings of Uí Fiachrach Aidhne

Preceded by Cobthach mac Gabran?	King of Uí Fiachrach Aidhne ?-622	Succeeded by Loingsech mac Colmáin

Preceded by Uatu mac Áedo	King of Connacht; 600–622	Succeeded by Loingsech mac Colmáin
