= Tipraiti mac Taidg =

Tipraiti mac Taidg (or Tipraite mac Taidg) (died 786) was a King of Connacht from the Uí Briúin branch of the Connachta. He was the grandson of Indrechtach mac Muiredaig Muillethan (died 723), a previous king and nephew of Áed Balb mac Indrechtaig (died 742). He was of the Síl Muiredaig sept of the Uí Briúin. He ruled from 782 to 786.

In 783 in the year of his accession occurred the promulgation of the law of Saint Patrick of Armagh in Cruachu by Tipraite and the abbot of Armagh, Dub-dá-Leithe. This marked the mutual recognition of the claims of Armagh and of the Ui Briun in Connacht. Tipraite's choice of Armagh over Iona shows a desire to pursue an independent ecclesiastical policy from that of Donnchad Midi mac Domnaill, the high king.

In 784 Tipraite defeated the Ui Fiachrach Aidhne at the Battle of Carn Conaill (near Gort). Also, in 785 he defeated the northern Ui Fiachrach at the Battle of Muad (Moy River). These victories established the dominance of the Ui Briun in Connacht.

== See also ==
- Kings of Connacht
