= Domnall mac Cathail =

Domnall mac Cathail (died 715) was a possible King of Connacht from the Uí Briúin branch of the Connachta. He was the son of Cathal mac Rogallaig (died 680) and grandson of a previous king Rogallach mac Uatach (died 649).

Though listed in king-lists he is omitted from the annals as king except for the Chronicum Scotorum which mention him as king of Connacht at his death obit in 715. He would have acceded to the throne in 707 upon the slaying of Indrechtach mac Dúnchado Muirisci (died 707) by the northern Ui Neill.

== See also ==
- Kings of Connacht
