= Echu Tirmcharna =

Irish king

Echu Tirmcharna mac Fergusso (died ca. 556) was a king of Connacht from the Uí Briúin branch of the Connachta. Genealogically he is mentioned as the great-great grandson of Dauí Tenga Uma (d. 500) a previous king. Prof. Byrne believes that the early Uí Briúin genealogies are fabricated however. His place in the king lists falls between the reign of Ailill Inbanda (d. 549) and of his son Áed mac Echach Tirmcharna (d. 575). The Annals of Tigernach simply mention him as king in 556 and his son's accession to the throne in 557.

A Poem on the Kings of Connaught describes him as Echu "dryflesh", the "choice man", and also as noble.

== See also ==
- Kings of Connacht
