= Conchobar mac Tadg =

Conchobar mac Tadg, King of Connacht 967–973 and eponym of the O'Conor family of Connacht.

== Biography ==
A son of Tadc in Túir (of the tower), Conchobar's father died in 956 as king of Connacht, but his sept of the Síol Muireadaigh were successfully opposed by Fergal ua Ruairc of the Uí Briúin of Bréifne, who reigned till 967.

According to Ailbhe Mac Shamhráin,

"Conchobar had inherited marriage-alliances with the principal dynasties of the Uí Néill: his sister Bébinn was wife to the king of Brega, Domnall son of Congalach Cnogba, while another sister, Muirgel, was married into the Cenél Conaill. It was his brother-in-law Domnall son of Congalach who slew Fergal grandson of Ruarc in 966, leaving the way clear for Conchobar to assume overkingship of Connacht, the new provincial ruler, however, was not to enjoy an untroubled reign."

The death of one of his sons occurred in 967 while supporting Muirgel's husband's kindred against their great rivals, the Cenél nÉogain.

The kings of Bréifne continued to attempt to re-gain the provincial kingship, as attested by Conchobar's defeat of Ualgarc ua Ruarc.

The Book of Leinster implies that Conchobar died of colic, and that his successor, Cathal, was killed at the battle of Céis Chorainn, reigning three days. His killer was Murchad Glun re Lar mac Flaithbertaigh of Cenél nÉogain. Mac Shamhráin states:

"It seems that the provincial kingship remained weak for the next twenty years, as dynasty from several different lines extended their sway over parts of Connacht. However, through his son Cathal, who eventually emerged as provincial ruler, Conchobar became the ancestor of the royal line of Ua Conchobair (O'Connor), which provided most of the later kings of Connacht."

His great-grandchildren were the first to be known by the surname Ua Conchobair, and his senior male descendant is The Ó Conchubhair Donn.

A brother of Conchobar's was Máel Ruanaid Mór mac Tadg, ancestor of the Kings of Moylurg and the families of Ua/Ó Maolruanaid (Mulrooney) and MacDiarmata (MacDermot).

Preceded by Fergal Ua Ruairc	King of Connacht; 967–973	Succeeded by Cathal mac Tadg
