= Colla mac Fergusso =

Colla mac Fergusso (or Colla mac Forgusso, died 796) was a possible King of Connacht from the Uí Briúin branch of the Connachta. He was the son of Forggus mac Cellaig (died 756), a previous king. The sept of Uí Briúin he belonged to was the Síl Cellaig of Loch Cime (Lough Hackett, near Headford in modern County Galway) named for his grandfather Cellach mac Rogallaig (died 705).

Though omitted from king lists such as the Book of Leinster, he is called king at his death obit in the Annals of Innisfallen. However, the Annals of Ulster say that Muirgius mac Tommaltaig (died 815) became king after defeating Cináed mac Artgail (died 792) at the Battle of Sruth Cluana Argai (Cloonargid, Roscommon, Co.) in 792. His death is recorded in this annal as King of Uí Briúin.

Colla was the last king from the Síl Cellaig sept. This sept was later displaced from this area by the Uí Briúin Seóla.
