= Dauí Tenga Uma =

Dauí Tenga Uma (died 500) was a King of Connacht from the Uí Briúin branch of the Connachta.

== Biography ==
Dauí Tenga Uma ("Copper-Tongue"—for the beauty of his speech) is listed in the genealogies as a great-great-great grandson of Brión, the eponymous founder of his dynasty. He is specifically stated to be the ancestor of the Uí Briúin Seóla branch. (His brothers Echu Tirmcharna and Feargna were the progenitors of the Uí Briúin Aí and Uí Briúin Bréifne branches respectively.) Francis Byrne believes him to be a duplicate of his supposed great-great grandfather, Dauí Galach, that the early Uí Briúin genealogies are fabrications and that these two were the same person. Dauí succeeded Ailill Molt of the Ui Fiachrach (died 484) as king.

Keating mentions two marital relations of his family:

- his daughter Duinseach ingen Duach married the high-king Muirchertach mac Ercae (died 532) of the Cenel nEogain and was mother of his sons Domnall and Fergus;
- his granddaughter Mugain ingen Cú Charainn was married to the high-king Diarmait mac Cerbaill (died 563) of the southern Ui Neill and mother of the high-king Áed Sláine (died 602).

In 500 Daui was defeated and slain at the Battle of Segsa (Seghais or Boyle River) by his own son-in-law Muirchertach mac Ercae. The annals record that the war was caused by his daughter Duinseach.

== See also ==
- Kings of Connacht
