= Connmhach mac Duinn Cothaid =

Connmhach mac Duinn Cothaid, King of Ui Fiachrach Muaidhe, died 787.

Connmhach is the earliest recorded King of Ui Fiachrach Muaidhe, and was descended from the Kings of Connacht of the Ui Fiachrach dynasty.

== Uí Fiachrach Muaidhe genealogy ==
   Fiachnae
   |
   |
   Elgach
   |
   |
   Maeldubh
   |
   |
   Tipraite
   |
   |
   Dunchad Muirisci
   |
   |_______________________________________________
   |                              |                |  
   |                              |                |
   Indrechtach, d.707.            mac Dunchad      Ailill
   |                              |                | 
   |                              |                |
   Ailill Medraige, d.764.        Tipraite, d.719  Cathal
   |                                               |
   |                                               |
   Cathal, d.816.                                 Donn Cothaid mac Cathail, d.787.

Preceded by Donn Cothaid mac Cathail	Kings of Ui Fiachrach Muaidhe ?–787	Succeeded by Cathal mac Ailill?
