= Forggus mac Cellaig =

Forggus mac Cellaig (or Fergus mac Cellaig) (died 756) was a King of Connacht from the Uí Briúin branch of the Connachta. He was the son of Cellach mac Rogallaig (died 705), a previous king and brother of Domnall mac Cellaig (died 728). The sept of Uí Briúin he belonged to was the Síl Cellaig of Loch Cime (Lough Hackett, near Headford in modern County Galway) named for his father. He reigned from 742 to 756.

Events occurred in his reign which helped to weaken the other branches of the Connachta. In 743 a battle was fought between the Uí Fiachrach Aidhne and their ex-allies the Uí Maine. Also in 743 the Ui Aillelo fought a battle in Mag Luirg (Moylurg, the plains of Boyle) with the Gailenga.

Fergus himself had to impose his authority and in 746 in alliance with the Conmaicne he was defeated by opponents from the Uí Briúin. That same year he slaughtered The Uí Briúin Seóla branch in southern Connacht. In 752 the Ui Briun destroyed the Calraige Luirg, who were possibly vassals of the Ui Aillelo. In 753 the Ui Aillelo were slaughtered by the Grecraige.

The Ui Briun expansion to the north met with the hostility of the Cenél Coirpri branch of the Uí Néill. In 754 was fought the Battle of Ard Noíscan (Ardneeskin) in Ui Aillelo territory between the Ui Briun and the Cenel Coipri. In 756 he inflicted a heavy defeat on them at the Battle of Móin Mór (in modern County Longford).

Forggus ensured the support of Clonmacnoise by promulgating the Law of Ciarán of Clonmacnoise and the Law of Brendan of Clonfert in 744.

His son Colla mac Fergusso (died 796) was also a king of Connacht. Three of his sons Catharnach, Cathmug, and Artbran were slain in 758 at the Battle of Druim Robaig (Dromrovay, southern modern County Mayo) by the Uí Fiachrach in 758.
