= Cathal O'Connor (disambiguation) =

Cathal O'Conor was king of Connacht from 1280 to 1288.

Cathal O'Connor or Cathal O'Conor may also refer to:

== Kings of Connacht ==
- Cathal mac Conchobar mac Taidg, king of Connacht, died 1010
- Cathal Carragh Ua Conchobair, king of Connacht from 1189 to 1202
- Cathal Crobhdearg Ua Conchobair, 12th/13th-century king of Connacht

== Other ==
- Cathal Ó Conchobair, 14th-century Irish bishop
- Cathal O'Connor Faly, 16th-century Irish rebel, known as Don Carlos
