= Artgal mac Cathail =

Irish king (died 791)

Artgal mac Cathail (died 791) was a King of Connacht from the Uí Briúin branch of the Connachta. He was the son of Cathal mac Muiredaig Muillethan (died 735), a previous king and brother of Dub-Indrecht mac Cathail (died 768). He was of the Síl Cathail sept of the Ui Briun and ruled from 777 to 782.

In 777, The Ui Fiachrach who are from now on excluded from the throne slaughtered the Calraige. In 778, Artgal slaughtered the Ui Maine at the Battle of Mag Dairben.

In 780, the third enforcement of the law of Saint Commán of Roscommon and the abbot Áedán was imposed on the three Connachta. Artgal abdicated in 782 and went on a pilgrimage to Iona the following year where he died in 791.

His son Cináed mac Artgail (died 792) was also a king of Connacht.

== See also ==
- Kings of Connacht
