= Murchad mac Áedo =

Murchad mac Áedo was a King of Connacht from the Uí Briúin branch of the Connachta. He reigned from 839-840.

He was of the Síl Cathail sept and great-grandson of the founder of this sept Cathal mac Muiredaig (died 735). His grandfather Fogartach mac Cathail (died 789) had been a claimant to the Connacht throne. He was the first member of the Síl Cathail sept to hold the throne since 782 to be definitely recognized as king in both king lists and Irish annals. The Síl Muiredaig sept had dominated the kingship from 796 to 839 though his uncle, Máel Cothaid mac Fogartaig (flourished 818), may have been a co-ruler at one point.

Nothing is known of his short reign other than his death notice in the annals.
