= Domnall mac Cellaig =

Domnall mac Cellaig (died 728) was a King of Connacht from the Uí Briúin branch of the Connachta. He was the son of Cellach mac Rogallaig (died 705), a previous king. The sept of Ui Briun he belonged to was the Síl Cellaig of Loch Cime.

Domnall has been omitted from the king-lists but his reign is attested in the annals. He succeeded Indrechtach mac Muiredaig Muillethan (died 723) as king and ruled 723–728. His son Flaithrí mac Domnaill (died 779) was also a king of Connacht.

== See also ==
- Kings of Connacht
