= Muirgius mac Tommaltaig =

King of Connacht

Muirgius mac Tommaltaig (died 815) was a King of Connacht from the Uí Briúin branch of the Connachta. He was the great-grandson of Indrechtach mac Muiredaig Muillethan (died 723), a previous king. The death of his father Tommaltach mac Murgail (died 774) is recorded in the annals where he is called king of Mag nAi. Muirgius was of the Síl Muiredaig sept of the Uí Briúin. He reigned from 792 to 815.

== Struggle for the throne ==
The annals state that his reign began after Battle of Sruth Cluana Argai (Cloonargid, Co. Roscommon) in 792 when he defeated Cináed mac Artgail (d. 792), of the Síl Cathail sept, who was slain. In 793 we find him imposing the Law of Saint Commán of Roscommon in conjunction with abbot Aildobur (d. 800) upon the three Connachta at Cruachu.

Another important battle in 792 was the battle of Ard Maiccrime in County Sligo, where the Ui Ailello were delivered their death blow. Among the slain were Cathmug mac Flaithbertaig of the Cenél Coirpri and Cormac son of Dub dá Crích of the Uí Briúin Bréifne. The Annals of the Four Masters states that Muirgius was the victor in this battle also. The Ui Briun profited by the decline of the Ui Ailello and a branch of the Sil Muiredaig later occupied Mag Luirg.

The Annals of Innisfallen refer to Colla mac Fergusso (d. 796) as king at the time of his death, and he may have been a rival to Muirgius. Also, in 796 we find Muirgius defeated at the battle of Áth Féne on the northern border of Ciarraige in his home territory. His reign though appears uncontested after the battle of Dún Gainiba in 799 where Muirgius was victorious in a battle among the Connachta. Also that year Gormgal, abbot of Armagh imposed the Law of Saint Patrick on Connacht.

== Subjugation of minor peoples ==
Muirgius then turned his attention to the south and in 802 he destroyed the fortress at Loch Riach(Loughrea) in the Uí Maine territory of Maenmag. The next year the Cruithne Sogain tribe revolted against their Uí Maine overlords in this region in 803.

Muirgius had imposed his son Cormac (d. 805) as abbot of Baslick, a church of the Ciarraige Aí but Cormac was slain and defeated by this tribe in 805. In revenge Muirgius devastated their lands that year.

In 810 two of his sons Tadg (d. 810) and Flaithnia (d. 810) were slain by the Luigni of Corann and in revenge Muirgius devastated their lands. In 812 he slaughtered the Calraige of Mag Luirg and then invaded the south of Connaught.

== Hostility to the High King ==
Muirgius was hostile to the ambitions of the high-king Áed Oirdnide mac Néill (d. 817) of the Cenél nEógain and in 805 Muirgius gave refuge to the Leinster king Fínsnechta Cethardec mac Cellaig (d. 808) who had been deposed by Aed; and Muirgius aided Fisnechta in recovering his throne in 806.

In 808 Muirgius gave support to Conchobar mac Donnchada (d. 833), the king of Mide of the Clann Cholmáin in his revolt against Aed Ordnide and advanced with the Connacht army as far as the assembly grounds of Tailtiu. But on the appearance of Aed's army the allies dispersed. Aed, however confined his vengeance to the Mide territory.

== Viking attacks ==
There were several Viking attacks on the coast of Connacht during his reign. In 812 the men of Umall killed Viking raiders but the men of Conmaicne were slaughtered by the raiders that same year. In 813 the Vikings slaughtered the men of Umall and slew their king Dúnadach.

== Church relations ==
Muirgius continued to seek support from the church and in 811 Nuado, abbot of Armagh visited Connacht with the casket of Saint Patrick and his Law. In 814 the abbot of Echdruim (Aughrim), Máel Dúin was slain by the Uí Maine. Aughrim was a daughter church of Clonmacnoise and that year Muirgius and Foirchellach, abbot of Clonmacnoise led a retaliatory expedition into Uí Maine territory south of the Suck River. The annals record that Adomnán's Law of the Innocents was violated on this campaign. Muirgius had the Law of Saint Ciarán of Clonmacnoise raised over Connacht in 814 at Cruachu. This law was imposed at an assembly at Cruachu held by Muirgius

== Descendants ==
Besides his slain sons Cormac (d. 805), Tadg (d. 810), and Flaithnia (d. 810); Muirgius had a son Cathal mac Muirgiussa (d. 839), a king of Connacht. Another son Máel Dúin was slain fighting the Vikings in 838.

Muirgius' brothers Diarmait mac Tommaltaig (d. 833) and Finsnechta mac Tommaltaig (d. 848) were also kings of Connacht.

== See also ==
- Kings of Connacht
