= Airechtach ua Dunchadh Muirsce =

Airechtach ua Dunchadh Muirsce (???–730) was a king of Ui Fiachrach Muaidhe.

Airechtach was a grandson of Dúnchad Muirisci. However, unlike his grandfather, he never became King of Connacht.

Preceded by	King of Ui Fiachrach Muaidhe ?–730	Succeeded by Ailill Medraige mac Indrechtaig
