= Síol Muireadaigh =

Family and territory in Roscommon, Ireland

The Síol Muireadaigh or Síol Muireadhaigh (lit. 'Seed of Muiredach'; Anglicized Sil Murray or Silmurray), was a leading sept of the Connachta group of Gaelic dynasties in medieval Ireland. The name Síol Muireadaigh was also used to refer to the territory occupied by the group which was centered around the ancient royal site of Cruachan on the plains of Connacht (Mag nAí/Machaire Connacht) in County Roscommon.

== Overview ==
A branch within the royal Uí Briúin (Uí Briúin Aí) dynasty, the tribe of Síol Muireadaigh consisted of all the descendants of Muiredach Muillethan, a 7th-century King of Connacht. The term Síol denotes the seed, or descendants, of Muiredach. According to historian C. Thomas Cairney, the Síol Muireadhaigh were the chiefly family of the Uí Briúin tribe of Connachta who in turn were from the Gaels, the fourth and final wave of Celtic settlement in Ireland which took place during the first century BC.

The major division within the tribe was between the descendants of Muireadhach's two sons, Indrechtach and Cathal (a quo Clann Cathail), who would both go on to become Kings of Connacht.

Síol Muireadagh's parent dynasty, the Uí Briúin, held the Kingship of Connacht, with one exception, for over 700 years (696–1474). The vast majority of Uí Briúin kings were members of the Síol Muireadaigh, whose power reached its peak in the 12th century when Toirdhealbhach Mór Ua Conchobhair was recognized as High King of Ireland. Toirdhealbhach's son Ruaidri mac Tairrdelbach Ua Conchobair, would go on to succeed him, becoming last the Gaelic High King of Ireland.

== Clann Cathail ==
The family groupings within Clann Cathail shown below are as listed in McFirbis' Leabhar na nGenealach (The Great Book of Irish Genealogies). Clann Cathail was ruled at various times by the O'Morans, O'Mulrenins, and the O'Flanagans, but the line of chiefs became permanent among the O'Flanagans by late medieval times. In addition to the family groupings below McFirbis lists 13 other surnames that he says also belonged to Clann Cathail: O'Mothlachain, O'Dathail, OhUllsa, O'Cloithfhilidh, O'Gusain, O'Fionnagain, O'Laighin, O'Laoghog, O'Tomhrair, O'Caomhoige, O'Breslein, O'Dubhain, and O'Fannain. He lists another sub-tribe in Clann Cathail called Siol Con Bhuidhe (a townland in Kilcorkey Parish called Ballyconboy was the land of that group). Other sources refer to O'Maolmordha (O'Moore) and O'Carthaig (O'Carthy) as being sub-chiefs of O'Flanagain.

The O'Flanagans had their main seat in Mantua (previously called Mointeach) which is located along the southern borders of Cloonyeffer and Corry East townlands in Shankill Parish. They also had another seat in the townland of Ballyroddy in Shankill Parish. They lost their territory to the O'Connor Roe in the 1300s.

== Septs ==
Septs of the Síol Muireadaigh included

- Ó Conchubhair/O'Conor
- Mac Diarmada/MacDermot
- Ó Tighe/Tighe/MacTeige
- Ó Flannagain/O'Flanagan
- Ó Fithcheallaigh/O'Feely
- Ó Mannachan/O'Monahan
- Ó Maoilbhreanainn/O'Mulrennan/Brennan
- Ó Birn/O'Beirne
- Ó Concheanainn/Concannon
- Mag Oireachtaigh/MacGeraghty/Geraghty
- Mac Maghnusa/MacManus
- Ó Conbhuidhe/O’Conboy
- Ó Fionnachta/O’Finnerty/Finnerty

== Family tree ==
    Muiredach Muillethan of the Connachta
    |
    |____________________________________________________________________________
    |                                                                           |
    |                                                                           |
 Indrechtaig, died 723.                                                      Cathal
    |                                                                           |
    |____________________________________________________________               |               
                                               |                                |
                                               |      |         |               |                  
                                               |                                |
                                               |      |         |               |                     
                                               |                                |
                                               |    Murgal    Medb              |                                                                
                                               |          = Áed Oirdnide        |               
                                               |                |               |
                                               |                |               |
                                               |                |               |
                                               |            Niall Caille        |
                                               |                |               |
                                               |                |               |
                                               |            Áed Findliath       |
                                               |________________________________|
                                                                |
                                                                |
                                                         Síol Muireadaigh

== See also ==
- Kings of Connacht
- O'Conor Don
- MacDermot family
- MacDermot Roe
- Ollamh Síol Muireadaigh
- Irish clans
