= Flaithrí mac Domnaill =

Flaithrí mac Domnaill (died 777) was a King of Connacht from the Uí Briúin branch of the Connachta. He was the son of Domnall mac Cellaig (d.728), a previous king. The sept of Uí Briun he belonged to was the Síl Cellaig of Loch Cime. He reigned from 773-777.

In 775 the Uí Maine were defeated by the Sil Cellaig at the Battle of Achad Liac (in Cluain Acha Liag, now called Killeroran- i.e. the Uí Maine inauguration site). After this battle the law of Ciarán of Clonmacnoise was again imposed on Connacht.

The annals record his death in 777, but other historians state he abdicated and died in 779.

== See also ==
- Kings of Connacht
