= Tír Amhlaidh =

Tir Amhlaidh Tír Amhalghaidh
- Túath/ Tríocha Céad
- History
  - Created: uncertain
  - Abolished: 1603
  - Succeeded by: Barony of Tirawley, County Mayo
- Status: Túath (Territory)
- Subdivisions
  - Type: Parishes/Townlands

Tír Amhlaidh was a túath in northwest Ireland. It is now represented by the barony of Tirawley, County Mayo. The name is derived from Amhalghaidh, son of Fíachra son of Eochaid Mugmedon of the Connachta group of early Gaelic dynasties.

== History ==
The O'Dowds were chiefs, but were then replaced by the Barretts in the 13th century after the Battle of Kilroe was fought between the Barretts led by William Mór Barrett and the O'Dowds led by Taichlech O' Dubhdha. Several military families of Welsh extraction and associated with the Norman invasion settled in this region and intermarried with the local clans, namely Walshes, Joyces, Lawlesses, Lynotts, and Barretts.

== Organisation ==
The O'Dowds kings were traditionally inaugurated at the site of Carn Amhalghaidh, now in the townland of Carns near Killala. The túath contained many castles as part of its defence network.

== Annalistic references ==
- U913.6. Niall son of Aed led an expedition to Connacht and inflicted a battle-rout on the warriors of the north of Connacht, i.e. on the Uí Amalgada and the men of Umall, and they left behind a very large number either dead or captured, including Mael Cluiche son of Conchobor.
- M1205.2.Donat O'Beacdha, Bishop of Tyrawley, died.
- M1206.11. Rory O'Toghda, Chief of Bredagh in Hy-Awley Tirawley, died.
- M1207.9. Cathal Carragh, son of Dermot, who was son of Teige O'Mulrony, took a great prey from Cormac, son of Tomaltagh Mac Dermot, and O'Flynn of the Cataract, but was overtaken by some of the Connacians, namely, Dermot, son of Manus, who was son of Murtough O'Conor; Cormac, son of Tomaltagh; Conor God O'Hara, Lord of Leyny; and Donough O'Dowda, Lord of Tirawley and Tireragh; and a battle ensued, in which Cathal Carragh was defeated. He was taken prisoner, and blinded; and his son, Maurice, with the son of Cugranna O'Flanagan, and many others, were killed (in the battle).
- M1460.1. The monastery of Maighin in Tirawley, in the diocese of Killala, in Connaught, was founded by Mac William Burke, at the request of Nehemias O'Donohoe, the first Irish provincial vicar of the order of St. Francis de Observantia.
- M1463.8. The son of Main Barrett, Lord of Tirawley, and Siacus Cam, the son of Farrell, Lord of the Clann-Auliffe O'Farrell, died
