= Cath Sruthair =

766 AD attack by the Ui Briuin

Cath Sruthair (transl. Battle of Sruthair) was an aggression by the Ui Briuin against a branch of the Conmaicne in 766 AD. The battle site was probably Shrule in County Mayo.

== Battle ==
Dub-Indrecht mac Cathail and the Uí Briúin were victorious, and Áed Dub mac Taichlech and many Conmaicne were killed. The Annals of Ulster has the following entry-

"766 Irish: Bellum Sruthre iter H. Briuin & Conmaicniu ubi plurimi ceciderunt di Conmaicnibh, & Aedh Dubh m. Toichlich cecidit. Dub Innrecht m. Cathail uictor fuit."

"766 English: The battle of Sruthair between the Uí Briúin and the Conmaicne in which very many of the Conmaicne fell, and Aed Dub son of Taichlech fell. Dub Innrecht, son of Cathal, was victor".

== Battle site ==
Sruthair ("stream") was identified as Abbeyshrule, near the Inny, in County Longford by O'Donovan. He considered this the first direct evidence of Ui Briuin expansionism east of the River Shannon. However Eoin MacNeill said "sruthair" was a common place name, Abbeyshrule was "too far south", and another 'Sruthair' was north-west in the barony of Moydow. Mac Neill noted Shrule, near Lough Mask, in County Mayo could be the battle site. Walsh agrees. Both Ui Briuin and Conmaicne were settled in Connacht. The battle marks an Ui Briun expansion to the west. "Sruthair", now Shrule, was part of, or adjacent with, the tuath of Conmaicne Cuile in Mayo.

== See also ==
- Conmhaicne
- Cath Maige Tuired
