= Fergus mac Fothaid =

Fergus mac Fothaid was a King of Connacht from the Uí Briúin branch of the Connachta. He reigned from 840-843.

He was of the Síl Cathail sept and grandson of Dub-Indrecht mac Cathail (died 768), a previous king. The Síl Muiredaig sept had dominated the kingship from 796-839 but this was broken by the predecessor of Fergus, his second cousin Murchad mac Áedo (died 840).

Nothing is known of his short reign other than his death notice in the annals.
