= Ailill Molt =

Ailill mac Nath Í (died c. 482 or 484), called Ailill Molt, is included in most lists of the High Kings of Ireland and is also called King of Connacht. His cognomen, molt, means "ram" but its origin is unknown.

== Family ==
Ailill was said to be the son of Nath Í and Ethne ingen Chonrach Cais. His paternal grandfather Fiachrae is called a brother of Niall of the Nine Hostages. Ailill thus belonged to the Connachta, a kindred united by supposed descent from Conn of the Hundred Battles, which included the Uí Néill, the Uí Briúin and, named for Ailill's grandfather, the Uí Fiachrach.

Although Ailill's descendants are not reckoned High Kings of Ireland, his grandson Eógan Bél and great-grandson Ailill Inbanda are counted as Kings of Connacht. Ailill's son Mac Ercae may have been an important historical figure, but the record conflates Mac Ercae mac Ailello Muilt and the Uí Néill king Muirchertach mac Muiredaig, called Muirchertach Mac Ercae, probably confusing events beyond recovery.

== Historicity ==
The broad agreement of generally pro-Uí Néill sources that Ailill was High King is offered as proof that this was the case. Although the chronology of 5th century High Kings has been the subject of manipulation, it is seen as unlikely that later historians and genealogists would have added a non-Uí Néill king had the belief that Ailill was king not been widespread. Ailill is said to have become High King following the supernatural death of Lóegaire mac Néill, supposedly c. 463. The Irish annals contain many references to him, but most of these are taken to be late additions, or come from the now lost Book of Cuanu, extracts of which are preserved in the Annals of Ulster. Tradition has him killed in battle at Faughan Hill, fighting against the sons of Niall. The king lists say that he was succeeded by Lugaid mac Lóegairi.

Opposing the view that Ailill was included as a High King from the earliest times, Thomas Charles-Edwards suggests that the inclusion of Nath Í and Ailill Molt was a means to reinforce links between the Uí Néill and the other branches of the Connachta in the late 7th or 8th centuries, when he presumes the king lists and the annals related to Saint Patrick to have been collected and edited. This is offered without giving undue support to any contemporary claims by the other Connachta kindreds, the Uí Ailello and, in particular, the powerful Uí Briúin, to the High Kingship.

Preceded by Nath Í mac Fiachrach	King of The Connachta ?–after-482	Succeeded by Dauí Tenga Uma
