= Cellach mac Rogallaig =

Irish king

Cellach mac Rogallaig (or Cellach Locha Cime) (died 705) was a King of Connacht from the Uí Briúin Sil Cellaig branch of the Connachta. He was the son of Rogallach mac Uatach (died 649), a previous king. He succeeded his nephew Muiredach Muillethan mac Fergusso (died 702) as king in 702.

He reigned from 702 to 705. The king lists in this period vary in their order of kings. The reign of Cellach is misplaced in the king-lists, which place his reign between Dúnchad Muirisci mac Tipraite (died 683) and Fergal Aidne mac Artgaile (died 696). Both the Annals of Tigernach and the Annals of Ulster call him King of Connachta at his death obit however in 705. To confuse matters further, he is listed as the guarantor of the Cáin Adomnáin in 697 at the Synod of Birr as King of Connacht.

In July 703, the high-king Loingsech mac Óengusso of the Cenél Conaill led a large army into Connacht to levy tribute but was defeated and slain along with many of his sons and other kings of the Ui Neill at the Battle of Corann (in South County Sligo). The saga tradition of this battle is preserved in the Fragmentary Annals of Ireland. According to this, the bards of the high king mocked Cellach for being an old, shaky king. However, Cellach:

sprang from his chariot swiftly and far from the chariot, and the cracking of the old man's bones was audible as he leaped out of the chariot. And after that he said, in a loud voice, springing to the nearby battle: ‘Connachtmen, defend and protect your own freedom, for the people who are against you are not nobler or braver than you, and they have not done any better than you up to now.’ And he was talking to them like that, with his voice quavering and his eyes on fire."

The Connaughtmen rose to the challenge and won the battle.

The reason for Loingsech's attack may have been because the Cenél nEógain had outflanked the Cenél Conaill in the north, resulting in expansion into Connacht as the only option available for them, as well as a desire by Loingsech to assert his authority as high king. It also may have been due to the pressure of the Uí Briúin on the Cenél Coirpri in the direction of Breifne, which would have cut off the Cenél Conaill from their access to the midlands. The true reason is unclear; the Ui Neill were defeated.

At his death obit in 705 in the annals, it is mentioned that he entered the clerical life. He is also referred to as Cellach Locha Cime. This lake is now Lough Hackett, near Headford in modern County Galway. His children were called the Síl Cellaig and contested the kingship of Connacht with the Síl Muiredaig and Síl Cathail throughout the 8th century. They were later displaced from this area by the Uí Briúin Seóla.

His children included Domnall mac Cellaig (died 728) and Forggus mac Cellaig (died 756), both kings of Connacht.
