= Duinseach ingen Duach =

Irish queen c. 500 CE

Duinseach ingen Duach, Queen of Tara, fl. 500.

== Background ==
Duinseach was a daughter of Dauí Tenga Uma, King of the Connachta. She was married to King Muirchertach mac Muiredaig (died 532), King of Tara. They were ancestors of the Cenél nEógain.

== Battle of Seaghais ==
Duinseach is said to have been responsible for the battle of Seaghais in 500, where her husband killed her father.

== Annalistic account of Seaghais ==
An account of the battle is given sub anno 499 (sic 500) in the Annals of the Four Masters:

The battle of Seaghais was fought by Muircheartach mac Earca against Duach Teangumha, King of Connaught. The cause of the battle was this, viz.: Muircheartach was a guarantee between the King and Eochaidh Tirmcharna, his brother, and Eochaidh was taken prisoner against the protection of Muircheartach. In proof of which Ceannfaeladh said:

- The battle of Seaghais;
- a certain woman caused it;
- red blood was over lances,
- By Duiseach, daughter of Duach.
- The battle of Dealga, the battle of Mucramha,
- and the battle of Tuaim Drubha,
- With the battle of Seaghais,
- wherein fell Duach Teangumha.

Against the Connaughtmen these battles were gained.

== Family tree ==
    Eochaid Mugmedon
    |
    |_______________________________________________
    |                                             |
    |                                             |
    Brión                                 Niall Noígíallach
    |                                             |
    |                                             |
    Dauí Tenga Uma                         Eógan mac Néill
    |                                             |
    |                                             |
    |________________                    Muiredach mac Eógain
    |               |                             |
    |               |                             |
    Cú Charainn     Duinseach, alive 500 = Muirchertach mac Muiredaig/Muirchertach mac Ercae
    |                                          |
    |                          ________________|____________________
    Mugain ingen Cú Charainn   |                               |
   =Diarmait mac Cerbaill      |                               |
    |                         Forggus mac Muirchertaig Domnall Ilchelgach, died c. 566.
    |
    Áed Sláine

== Cenél nEógain descendants ==
    Domnall Ilchelgach, died c. 566.
    |
    |______________________________________
    |                    |                |
    |                    |                |
    Áed Uaridnach Eochaid Colgo
    |
    |_______________________________________
    |                                      |
    |                                      |
    Máel Fithrich mac Áedo, d. 630.    Dáre
    |
    |_____________________________________________
    |                                             |
    |                                             |
    Máel Dúin mac Máele Fithrich, died 681.   Máel Tuile (ancestor of Síl Maíle Fithrich)
    |
    |
    Fergal mac Máele Dúin
    |
    |_____________________________________________________
    |               |                    |             |
    |               |                    |             |
    Áed Allán Niall Frossach Conchobar Colgu (ancestor of Clann Colgan)
    |               |
    |      _________|_________________________________________________________
    |      |                       |                 |                       |
    |      |                       |                 |                       |
    |      Áed Oirdnide Colmán Ferchar Muirchertach
    |      |                 (Clann Colmáin) (Muinter Dúin Bó) (a quo Clann Muirchertaich Locha Enaich)
    |      |
    |      |____________________________________________________________________________________
    |      |                              |                  |                |               |
    |      |                              |                  |                |               |
    |      Niall Caille (died 846) Máel Dúin Fogartach Blaithmac Máel Calland
    |        (issue) (Síl Máela Dúin) (issue) (Úi Duib Enaich)
    |__________________________________________
    |                                        |
    |                                        |
    Máel Dúin mac Áedo Alláin Cathal (ancestor of Clann Cathail)
    |
    |___________________________________________________________________
    |                                         |                        |
    |                                         |                        |
    Murchad mac Máele Dúin, fl. 819–833.  Tigernach Flann
    |                                         |                        |
    |                                   Úi Tigernaich     Úi Chellaich & Úi h-Uidir.
    |
    |__________________________________________________________________
    |                                 |                               |
    |                                 |                               |
    Erulb/Herulfr Ruadrí                          Muiredach
    |                                 |                               |
    |________________________         |_______________                |
    |                       |         |              |                Úi Flaithbertaich
    |                       |         |              |
    Amlaíb Sartobda Birn Máel Ciaráin
    |                       |         |              |
    |                       |         |              |
    Niall, d.958/964?     Tomrar Muintir Birn   Úi Domnalláin
    |                       |
    |                       |
    Áed Gilla Maire
    |                       |
    |                       |
    Donnchad Tomrar
    d.1014.               d. 1013?
    |
    |
    Máel Colum

== Muintir Birn/Byrne of Donegal ==
    Birn mac Ruadrí mec Murchad mac Máele Dúin
    |
    |___________________________________________________________
    |                    |                                   |
    |                    |                                   |
    Anféid Cern Guthmár Donnacán
    |                    |                                   |
    |                    |                                   |
    Tellach n-Anfida Tellach Cruind id est Úi Fergail Tellach n-Donnacáin
