= Eógan Bél =

Eógan Bél mac Cellaig (died 542) was a king of Connacht from the Uí Fiachrach branch of the Connachta. He was the grandson of the high king Ailill Molt. His reign began sometime after 500. His byname bél means "mouth" or "lip," supposedly because he received praise from all who encountered him as a child. Other sources claim he had a cleft lip.

During his reign, he feuded with the northern Uí Néill and the Connachta suffered a defeat at Aidne in 531 during the reign of the powerful high king Muirchertach mac Ercae of the Cenél nEógain. Also during his reign, a victory was one at the Battle of Claenloch (near Kinelea, Co. Galway) by the Uí Fiachrach Aidhne branch in the south under its king Goibnenn mac Conaill over Maine mac Cerbaill (brother of Diarmait mac Cerbaill) of the southern Uí Néill who was slain in 537. Goibnenn was defending the right to take hostages from the Uí Maine. This battle was significant in separating the Uí Maine from the Cenel Maine of Meath and in separating the Uí Néill from the Connachta.

Eogan's feud with the northern Uí Néill finally led to the Battle of Slicech (Sligo) in 542 in which Eogan was slain. According to the annals, the victors were Muichertach's sons Fergus and Domnall along with Ainmuire mac Sétnai and Ninnid mac Duach of the Cenel Conaill.

The Annals of the Four Masters say this of the battle:

"The battle of the Uí Fiachrach was fought with fury of edged weapons against Bel, The kine of the enemy roared with the javelins, the battle was spread out at Crinder. The Sligeach bore to the great sea the blood of men with their flesh, They carried many trophies across Eabha, together with the head of Eoghan Bel."

A Middle Irish poem Caithréim Cellaig gives a different view of this battle. It states that Eogan won the battle but was mortally wounded and died afterwards. He was buried standing up in pagan style at Ráith Ua Fiachrach on Knocknarea with his red spear in his hand as a challenge to the northern Uí Néill. The Uí Néill later dug up his body and buried it face down at Óenach Locha Gile on Lough Gill in Cenél Caipre territory of the Uí Néill. Eogan is mentioned as a great warrior and honorable.

Local lore claims that Eogan may have been buried under Magheraghanrush Court Tomb.

The poem also mentions that his son Cellach was a pupil of Saint Ciarán of Clonmacnoise but was treacherously slain by the Uí Fiachrach Aidne. Prof. Byrne believes that though the poem introduces characters of a later date, it does reflect a tradition of feud between the northern and southern branches of the Uí Fiachrach.

He was succeeded by his son Ailill Inbanda.

== See also ==
- Kings of Connacht
