= Murtogh Moynagh O'Conor =

Prince of Connacht during the 12th century

Murtogh Moynagh O'Conor (Irish: Muirchertach Muimhnech Ua Conchobair), prince of Connacht, Ireland, flourished 1156–1210.

== Biography ==
Muirchertach was one of over twenty sons sired by King Tairrdelbach of Connacht. His nickname, Muimhnech, indicated that he was fostered in Munster.

He was one of three sons of Tairdelbach arrested in 1156 by their brother, Ruaidrí Ua Conchobair, on the death of their father. Ruaidrí was his father's Tánaiste, but secured Muirchertach, Brian Breifneach and Brian Luighneach to prevent them gaining the kingship. As an extra precaution, Brian Breifneach was blinded. Before his death Muirchertach became Tánaiste himself and held control of much of present-day County Mayo. His sons were subsequently expelled from this area in the conquest of Connacht by Richard Mór de Burgh, 1st Baron of Connaught in 1235.

He was the ancestor to the Clan Muircheartaigh Uí Conchobhair and five Kings of Connacht, who reigned between 1280 and 1343.

His wife died in 1231. She is described in the Annála Connacht as:

"..Feth fo lige, daughter of Conchobar Mac Diarmata and wife of Muirchertach Muimnech son of Toirrdelbach Mor O Conchobair, died this year. She was the greatest, most beautiful, most generous, purest woman and of the best repute that ever was in Leth Cuinn, and the mother of Magnus mac Muirchertaig Muimnig and Conchobar Ruad and Tuathal and Toirrdelbach the priest, prior of the church of Peter and Paul".

The Mac Diarmata family also had a recently acquired lordships in central Mayo, north of the Clan Muircheartaigh.

== Offspring ==
- Maghnus mac Muirchertaig Ó Conchobair
- Conchobair Ruadh mac Muirchertaig Ó Conchobair (father of Cathal Ó Conchobair and Maghnus Ó Conchobair)
- Tuathal mac Muirchertaig Ó Conchobair
- Toirrdelbach mac Muirchertaig Ó Conchobair
