= Amalgaid mac Fiachrae =

Amalgaid mac Fiachrae (Old Irish: Amalgaid mac Fiachrach) (died 440) was a King of Connacht of the Ui Fiachrach sept. He was the son of Fiachrae mac Echach Mugmedóin and grandson of the high king Eochaid Mugmedón (died 362).

He is mentioned as king of Connacht in the Laud Synchronisms and the Book of Leinster which gives him a reign of 34 years. The Chronicon Scotorum and Annals of the Four Masters also refer to him. He was ancestor of the Ui Amalgada branch of the Ui Fiachrach. He gave his name to Tír Amhlaidh or its name to the barony of Tirawley, County Mayo.

A succession dispute broke out upon his death in Tír Amhlaidh between his sons Óengus and Éndae. Saint Patrick arranged for the high king Lóegaire mac Néill (died 462) and his brother Eógan mac Néill (died 465) to mediate the dispute. Endae had his son Conall baptised and given to Patrick's service for his support.

== Notes ==
Preceded by Niall Noígíallach	King of The Connachta ?–after 455	Succeeded by Nath Í mac Fiachrach
