= Artgal =

Artgal, Arthal, or Arthgal may refer to:

- Artgal mac Cathail (died 791), King of Connacht
- Arthgal ap Dyfnwal (died 872), King of Alt Clut
