= Áed in Gai Bernaig =

Áed Ua Conchobair or Áed in Gai Bernaig was the King of Connacht, and reigned from 1046 to 1067. He was the son of Tadg in Eich Gil.

A member of the Ó Conchobhair family, Áed ascended to the throne after King Art of Connacht was killed by the Cinel Conaill in 1046. This was "the second year after his (King Art) having plundered Cluain-mic-Nois."

In December 1061, Áed survived an invasion from a branch of the Uí Briúin dynasty (namely the Síl Cellaigh) which led to the expulsion of the branch to Iar Connacht.

The Muintir Murchadha invaded Loch Oirbsean, and deposed Aedh Ua Conchobhair. The victory of Gleann-Phadraig was gained by Aedh Ua Conchobhair over the people of West Connacht, where many were slain, together with Ruaidhrí. Ó Flaithbheartaigh, lord of West Connacht, was beheaded, and his head was carried to Cruachain in Connacht, after the son of Aedh, son of Ruaidhri, had been defeated.

The same branch, the Muintir Murchada, would later take the life of Áed's son, in May 1062.

Tadhg, son of Aedh Ua Conchobhair, was slain by the son of Aedh, son of Ruaidhrí, and the people of West Connacht.

In 1067, Áed died in battle against Áed Ua Ruairc, who became the next King of Connacht.

== Family tree ==
- Cathal mac Conchobar mac Taidg (d. 1010)
  - Dub Choblaigh m. Brian Boru, High King of Ireland (d. 1014)
    - Domnall?
      - Diarmait (d. 1051)
  - Tadg in Eich Gil, King of Connacht (d. 1030) m. ?
    - Áed in Gai Bernaig, King of Connacht (d. 1067)
  - Brian (d. 1029)
  - Conchobor (fl. 1029)
  - In Cléirech (fl. 1044)
    - Tadg (d. 1056)
    - Conchobar (d. 1069)
  - Tadhg Direach
    - An Gilla Lónach

Preceded by Art Uallach Ua Ruairc	Kings of Connacht; 1046–1067	Succeeded by Áed Ua Ruairc
