= Áed Balb mac Indrechtaig =

Áed Balb mac Indrechtaig (died 742) was a King of Connacht from the Uí Briúin branch of the Connachta. He was the son of Indrechtach mac Muiredaig Muillethan (died 723), a previous king. He was of the Síl Muiredaig sept of the Uí Briúin. His sobriquet Balb means "Stammerer".

Aed is mentioned as king in both the king-lists and the annals. He ruled from 735 to 742, but nothing is known of his reign.

== See also ==
- Kings of Connacht
