= Mugron mac Máel Cothaid =

Irish provincial king (died 872)

Mugron mac Máel Cothaid (died 872) was King of Connacht from 848–872. He was the son of Máel Cothaid mac Fogartaig and was of the Síl Cathail sept of the Ui Briun.

Mugron mac Máel Cothaid succeeded to the throne of the Connachta in 848 after the death of Finsnechta mac Tommaltaig, and was the last Sil Cathail king of Connacht. He was succeeded by Conchobar mac Taidg Mór.

| Preceded by Finsnechta mac Tommaltaig | King of Connacht; 848–872 | Succeeded by Conchobar mac Taidg Mór |
