= Bélchú =

Bélchú (Old Irish "dog-mouth", also spelled Bealchu or Bealcu) of Breifne is a warrior of Connacht in the Ulster Cycle of Irish Mythology.

According to legend, Bélchú finds the Ulster hero Conall Cernach close to death after his final combat with Cet mac Mágach, takes him home and tends to his wounds, intending to fight him when Conall is fit enough. As Conall recuperates, Bélchú regrets this honourable behaviour and tells his three sons to kill Conall as he sleeps in his sickbed. Conall overhears and makes Bélchú take his place in the bed, so when the sons arrive, they kill their father instead. Conall then kills the three sons, and takes all four heads home. One can also find Bélchú referenced in The Glenmasan Manuscript. The story is known as "Argain Belcon Breifne" or as "Togail Bruidne Bélchon Bréifne" (Massacre of Belcu Brefne). The site of the conflict is now the modern-day village of Belcoo, on the border of Counties Cavan and Fermanagh, which is reputedly named after Bélchú, although there are several colourful alternatives.
