= Kingdom of Breifne =

Medieval kingdom in Ireland

Kingdom of Breifne Bréifne (Irish)
- c. 750–1256
- Coat of arms
- Motto: Buagh (English: Victory)
- Breifne c. 900
- Capital: Dromahair
- Common languages: Irish
- Religion: Christianity
- Government: Tanistry / Elective monarchy
- King
  - 743: Dub Dothra
  - 1250–1257: Conchobar Ó Ruairc
- History
  - Split from Connacht: c. 750
  - Dissolution: 1256
Preceded by	Succeeded by
Connacht	East Breifne; West Breifne
- Today part of: Ireland

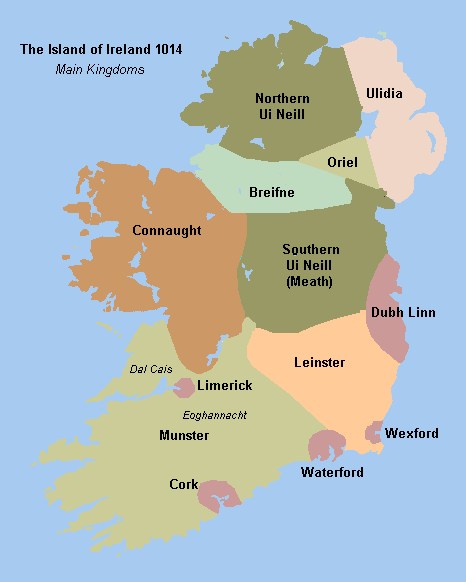
Ireland in 1014 showing the patchwork of kingdoms

The Kingdom of Breifne or Bréifne (Irish: [ˈbʲɾʲeːfʲnʲə]), anglicized as Breffny, was a medieval overkingdom in Gaelic Ireland. It comprised what is now County Leitrim, County Cavan and parts of neighbouring counties, and corresponds roughly to the Roman Catholic Diocese of Kilmore. It had emerged by the 10th century, as a confederation of túatha headed by an overking drawn from the Uí Briúin Bréifne.

By the 11th century, Bréifne was ruled by the Ua Ruairc (O'Rourke) dynasty. The kingdom reached the height of its power in the 12th century, under Tigernán Ua Ruairc. During the latter part of his reign, Bréifne took part in campaigns against the Norman invasion of Ireland. His assassination by the Anglo-Normans in 1172 was followed by a succession dispute, and a conflict between the Ua Ruairc and Ua Raghallaigh (O'Reilly) dynasties.

Following the Battle of Magh Slecht in 1256, Bréifne split into West Breifne (ruled by the Ua Ruairc) and East Breifne (ruled by the Ua Raghallaigh).

Bréifne was part of the province of Connacht until the reign of Queen Elizabeth I. In that time it was shired into the modern counties Cavan and Leitrim, Leitrim remaining a part of the province of Connacht while Cavan became part of Ulster.

== History ==
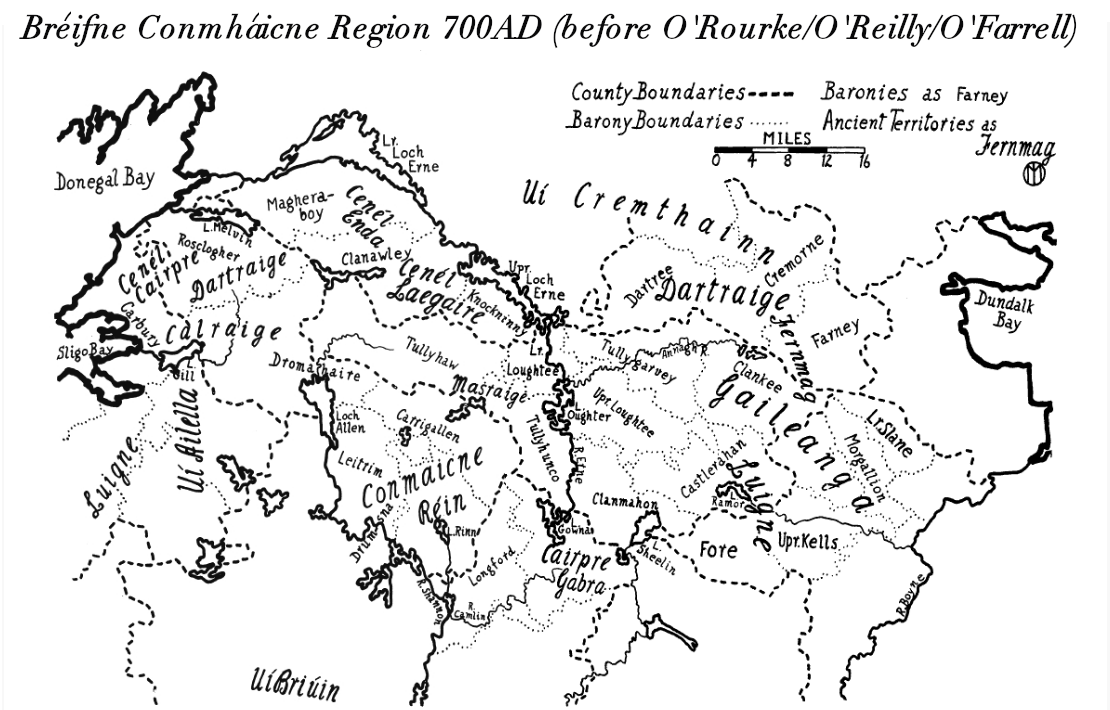
Septs of Breifne c. AD 700

Breifne is said to derive from an obsolete Irish word meaning "hilly", a description which describes the topography of this part of Ireland. But this derivation is opposed by the likes of O'Connell and MacEoin. It was referred to as the rough third of Connacht. Alternatively, the Metrical Dindshenchas states the name is derived from Brefne, daughter of Beoan mac Bethaig, the grandson of Nemed, a brave soldier-woman. She was slain by Regan after whom Tomregan is supposedly named.

In ancient times the area that became known as Bréifne was said to be occupied by the Erdini, called in Irish 'Ernaigh', who possessed the entire country bordering Lough Erne.

At the time of the Christianization of Ireland (c. 5th–6th century), groups believed to be in or near Breifne included the Glasraighe, Masraige, Dartraige, Armhaighe, Gallraighe, the Fir Manach, and the Gailenga.

Around the 6th century, a people known as the Conmaicne Rein are thought to have moved north from around the present Dunmore in County Galway and settled in Magh Rein (the area around Fenagh). From here they peopled what is now South Leitrim, which became known as Magh Rein, and its inhabitants as the Conmaicne Magh Rein. They consisted of different family groupings – Muintir Eolais, Muintir Cearbhallain (O Mulvey), and Cinel Luachain, among others.

About the 8th century, the area since known as Breifne was conquered and settled by the Uí Briúin Bréifne who were a branch of the royal family of Connacht. The Uí Briúin established themselves first in modern county Leitrim and then into what is now County Cavan. It can be argued that there is no contemporary evidence to support these speculations.

By the 9th century, the Ó Ruaircs had established themselves as kings of Breifne.

In the 10th and 11th centuries, the Ó Ruairc kings of Breifne fought some battles for the title of king of Connacht, with four different kings of Breifne gaining the title.

During the 12th century the reign of Tighearnán Ua Ruairc, the kingdom of Breifne was said to comprise most of the modern counties of Leitrim and Cavan, and parts of Longford, Meath, Fermanagh and Sligo.

In the 16th century Breifne O'Rourke eventually became County Leitrim and Breifne O'Reilly became County Cavan.

== Territories ==
The following territories were at one stage part of Breifne.

- Cenél Cairpre (Cairbre) – northern County Sligo and northeast County Leitrim. The territory of Coirpre, son of Niall of the Nine Hostages, around the 6th century extended from the Drowes west to the Owenmore River in Ballysadare.

Duncarbry (Dun Chairbre) marks the border of Cairbre's territory on the Drowes, while the Barony of Carbury in North Sligo still reminds us also today.

Noted chiefs of Cenél Cairpre included Ó Maolchloiche (O'Mulclohy).

- Cairpre Gabra – northern County Longford, barony of Granard. Ó Ronáin (O'Ronan) were lords in the barony of Granard until dispossessed by the Ó Fearghails in the 13th century.

According to the Annals of the Four Masters, about 476 AD, the Battle of Granard was fought by Eochaidh, son of Cairbre, son of Oilioll, son of Dunlaing, son of Enda Niadh against the Ui Dunlainge, Ui Briúin Cualann and Ui Fergusa of North Leinster.

- Cenél Laegaire – County Fermanagh. The Fir Manach, the Cinéal Eanna and the Cenél Laegaire were early indigenous tribes in the County Fermanagh area. The Cenél Laegairi mic Neill were noted west of Loch Erne (Book of Lecan). The Cenél Laegairi mic Neill were also noted in central Ireland (Mide, Meath).

== Kings of Breifne ==
Note: Where mentioned spelling used in the document is used here.

=== Early kings ===
- Echu Mugmedón, father to Brión, Fiachra, and Niall (of the Nine Hostages).
- Brión: son of Echu Mugmedón and the ancestor of the Uí Briúin Kings of Connacht.
- Aodh Fionn mac Fergna: king of Breifne
- Maenach mac Báithin: king of Ui Briuin Breifne – c.653
- Dub Dothra: king of the Ui Briuin & Conmaicne & Breifne – c.743
- Cormacc mac Duibh Dá Críoch: king of Breifni – c.790
- Muircheartach mac Donnghal, king of Breifne: c.800–806
- Mael Dúin mac Échtgal, king of Breifne: died 822
- Ceallach son of Cearnach, son of Dubh Dothra, king of Breifne
- Tighearnán mac Seallachan, king of Breifne: c.888 – father of Ruarc
- Ruarc mac Tighearnáin, lord of Ui Briuin Breifne: c. 893 – grandfather of Sean Fergal
- Flann mac Tighearnáin, lord of Breifne: c.910
- Cernachan mac Tighearnáin, king of Breifne: died 931
- Conghalach mac Cathaláin, lord of Breifne: c.935
- Cléircén son of Tigernán, king of Bréifne: c. 937
- Fergal? ua Ruairc, king of Bréifne

=== Ó Ruairc dynasty, Kings of Bréifne, c. 964–1257 ===
- (Sean) Fergal Ó Ruairc king of Connacht and Breifne: c.964–67
- Niall Ó Ruairc, heir of Breifne: 1000–1001
- Aedh Ó Ruairc, king of Breifne: died 1014–1015 – son of Fergal
- Art an caileach Ó Ruairc, king of Breifne: c.1020–1030? – son of Fergal
- Aedh Ó Ruairc, lord of Dartraige: 1029
- Art uallach (oirdnidhe) Ó Ruairc, king of Connacht and Breifne: c.1030–1046 – son of Aedh mac Fergal
- Niall Ó Ruairc, king of Breifne Connacht: 1047 – son of Art uallach
- Domnall Ó Ruairc, lord of Breifne: c.1057 – son of Niall
- Cathal Ó Ruairc, lord of Breifne: c.1051–1059 – son of Tighernan
- Aedh in Gilla Braite Ó Ruairc, king of Breifne: 1066 – son of Niall, son of Art Uallach
- Aed Ó Ruairc, king of Connacht & Breifne: c.1067–1087 – son of Art Uallach
- Donnchadh cael Ó Ruairc, king of Breifne: c.1084 – son of Art an caileach
- Ualgharg Ó Ruairc, royal heir of Connacht: 1085 – son of Niall, son of Art uallach
- Donnchadh Ó Ruairc, lord of Ui Briuin and Conmaicne: 1101 – son of Art Uí Ruairc
- Domnall Ó Ruairc, king of Connacht and Breifne: c.1095–1102 – son of Tigernán son of Ualgharg
- Cathal Ó Ruairc, lord of Ui Briuin Breifne and Gailenga: 1105 – son of Gilla Braite, son of Tigernán
- Domnall Ó Ruairc, lord of Ui Briúin: c.1108 – son of Donnchadh
- Aedh an Gilla Sronmaol Ó Ruairc king of Conmaicne: c.1117–1122 – son of Domnall (or Donnchadh).
- Tigernán mór Ó Ruairc, king of Breifne: c.1124–1152, 1152–1172 – son of Donnchad macDomnail
- Aedh Ó Ruairc, king of Breifne: 1152–1152, 1172–1176 – son of Gilla Bruide, son of Domnall
- Amlaíb Ó Ruairc, king of Breifne: 1176–1184 – son of Fergal, son of Domnall, son of Tigernán
- Aedh Ó Ruairc, king of Breifne: 1184–1187 – son of Máelsechlann, son of Tigernán mór
- Domnall Ó Ruairc, lord of the greater part of Breifne: c.1207 – son of Ferghal mac Domnall, son of Fergal
- Ualgarg Ó Ruairc, king of Breifne: c.1196–1209 – son of Cathal, son of Aedh, son of Donnchadh
- Art Ó Ruairc, king of Bréifne: 1209–1210 – son of Domnall, son of Fergal, son of Domnall
- Niall O'Ruairc, king of Dartry and clann Fermaige: 1228 – son of Congalach, son of Fergal, son of Domnall
- Ualgarg Ó Ruairc, king of Breifne: c.1210–1231 – son of Cathal, son of Aedh, son of Donnchadh
- Cathal riabach O'Ruairc, king of Bréifne: 1231–1236 – son of Donnchadh, son of Aedh, son of Gilla Braite
- Conchobar O'Ruairc, king of Bréifne: 1250?–1257 – son of Tigernán, son of Domnall, son of Cathal

=== Lords of Bréifne Ó Ruairc, 1257–1605 ===
- Sitric Ó Ruairc, king of Bréifne: elected and killed 1257–1257 – son of Ualgarg, son of Cathal
- Amlaíb Ó Ruairc, king of Breifne West: 1257–1258 – son of Art, son of Domnall, son of Fergal
- Domnall Ó Ruairc, king of Breifne: 1258 to 1258 (deposed) – son of Conchobar, son of Tigernán
- Art Ó Ruairc, king of Breifne East: 1258–1259 (deposed) – son of Cathal riabach, son of Donnchadh
- Domnall Ó Ruairc, king of Breifne: 1259 to 1260 (killed) – son of Conchobar son of Tigernán
- Art Bec Ó Ruairc, king of Breifne West: 1260–1260 (killed) – son of Art son of Domnall son of Fergal
- Art Ó Ruairc, king of Breifne: 1261–1266 (deposed)– son of Cathal riabach son of Donnchadh
- Conchobar Buide Ó Ruairc, king of Breifne: 1266–1273 – son of Amlaíb, son of Art
- Tigernán Ó Ruairc, king of Breifne: 1273–1274 – son of Aedh, son of Ualgarg, son of Cathal
- Art Ó Ruairc, king of Breifne: 1275–1275 – son of Cathal riabach, son of Donnchadh
- Amlaib Ó Ruairc, king of Breifne: 1275?–1307 – son of Art, son of Cathal riabach
- Domnall Carrach Ó Ruairc, king of Breifne: 1307–1311 – son of Amlaíb, son of Art
- Ualgarg Mór Ó Ruairc, king of Breifne: 1316–1346 – son of Domnall carrach
- Flaithbheartach Ó Ruairc, king of Breifne: 1346–1349 (deposed) – son of Domnall carrach
- Aodh Bán Ó Ruairc, king of Breifne: 1349–1352 – son of Ualgarg mór, son of Domnall
- Flaithbheartach Ó Ruairc, king of Breifne: 1352–1352 (died) – son of Domnall carrach
- Tadhg na gCaor Ó Ruairc, king of Breifne: 1352–1376 – son of Ualgarg mór son of Domnall carrach
- Gilla Crist Ó Ruairc, lord of Breifny: died 1378 – son of Ualgarg mór, son of Domnall carrach
- Tigernán mór Ó Ruairc, king of Breifne: 1376–1418 – son of Ualgarg mór, son of Domnall carrach
- Aodh buidhe Ó Ruairc, king of Breifne: 1418–1419 – son of Tigernán mór
- Tadhg Ó Ruairc, king of West Breifne: 1419–1424 – son of Tigernán mór
- Art Ó Ruairc, king of East Breifne: 1419–1424 – son of Tadhg na gcoar
- Tadhg Ó Ruairc, king of Breifne: 1424–1435 – son of Tigernán mór
- Lochlann Ó Ruairc, king of East Breifne: 1435–1458 – son of Tadhg na gcoar
- Donnchadh bacagh Ó Ruairc, king of West Breifne: 1435–1445 – son of Tigernán mór?
- Donnchadh Ó Ruairc, king of West Breifne: 1445–1449 – son of Tigernán óg, son of Tigernán mór
- Tigernán óg Ó Ruairc, king of Breifne: 1449–1468 – son of Tadhg, son of Tigernán mór
- Donnchadh losc Ó Ruairce, king of Breifne: 1468–1476 – son of Tigernán mór, son of Ualgarg mór
- Domnall Ó Ruairc, king of Breifne: 1468–1476, – son of Tadhg, son of Tigernán mór
- Feidhlimidh Ó Ruairc, king of Breifne: 1476–1500 – son of Donnchadh son of Tigernán óg
- Eóghan Ó Ruairc, king of Breifne: 1500–1528 – son of Tigernán óg son of Tadhg
- Feidhlimidh Ó Ruairc, king of Breifne: 1528–1536 – son of Feidhlimidh, son of Donnchadh
- Brian ballach mór Ó Ruairc, king of Bréifne, 1528–1559, 1560–1562 – son of Eóghan, son of Tigernán óg
- Tadhg Ó Ruairc, king of Breifne: 1559–1560 – son of Brian ballach
- Aodh gallda Ó Ruairc, king of Breifne: 1562–1564 – son of Brian ballach
- Aodh buidhe Ó Ruairc, king of Breifne: 1564–1566 – son of Brian ballach
- Brian na múrtha O'Rourke, king of Breifne: 1566–1591 – son of Brian ballach
- Brian óg na samhthach O'Rourke, king of Breifne: 1591–1600 – son of Brian na múrtha
- Tadhg Ó Ruairc, lord of Breifne: 1600–1605 – son of Brian na múrtha

=== Lords of Bréifne Ó Raghallaigh (Muintir Maelmordha) ===
- Godfrey Ua Raghallaigh, lord of Muintir-Maelmordha: 1161
- Cathal Ua Raghallaigh, lord of Muintir-Maelmordha: 1161–1162 – son of Godfrey
- Fergal son of Cu Chonnacht O'Raigillig, King of Dartry and Clann Fermaige: 1239
- Cathal Ua Raghallaigh, lord of Muintir-Maelmordha: 1256
- Con Ua Raghallaigh, chief of Muintir-Maelmordha: 1256–1257
- Matha Ua Raghallaigh, lord of Muintir-Maelmordha: 1282
- Ferghal O'Raigillig, East Breifne: 1282–1293
- Gilla-Isa Ruaid O'Raigillig, East Breifne: ↑1327 or 1330
- Matha son of Gilla-Isa O'Raigillig, East Breifne: 1304
- Mael Sechlainn O'Raigillig, East Breifne: 1328
- Richard [Risderd] O'Reilly, East Breifne: 1349–1346 or 1349
- Cu Chonnacht O'Reilly, East Breifne: 1362 or 1365 (resigned) – son of Gilla-Isa Ruaid
- Philip O'Reilly, East Breifne: 1365–1366/69 (deposed) – son of Gilla-Isa Ruaid
- Magnus O'Reilly, East Breifne: 1366/69–1366/69 (deposed)
- Philip O'Reilly, East Breifne: 1366/69–1384 – son of Gilla-Isu Ruaid
- Thomas, son of Mathgamain Ua Raighillaigh, king of Muinter-Mailmordha: 1384–1390
- John, son of Philip O'Reilly, East Breifne: 1390–1400 – son of Philip, son of Gilla-Isa-Ruaid
- Gilla-Isa son of Anrig O'Raigillig, East Breifne: 1400–1400
- Maelmordha, son of Cuconnaught O'Reilly, Muintir Reilly: 1403–1411 – son of Cu Chonnacht, son of Gilla-Isa Ruaid
- Richard, son of Thomas O'Reilly, East Breifne: 1411–1418
- Owen, son of John O'Reilly, Muintir-Maelmordha: 1418–1449
- Farrell, son of Thomas O'Reilly, Muintir-Maelmordha: 1450 (deposed) – (AM1450)
- John, son of Owen O'Reilly, Muintir-Maelmordha: 1450–1460 – son of Owen, son of John, son of Philip, son of Gilla-Isa-Roe
- Cathal O'Reilly, Muintir-Maelmordha: 1467
- Turlough, son of John O'Reilly, East Breifne: 1468–1487 – son of John, son of Owen
- John, son of Turlough O'Reilly, East Breifne: 1487–1491
- John, son of Cathal O'Reilly, East Breifne: 1491–1510 – son of Cathal, son of Owen son of John
- Hugh, son of Cathal O'Reilly, East Breifne: 1514
- Owen, son of Cathal O'Reilly, East Breifne:1526
- Farrell, son of John O'Reilly, East Breifne & Conmaicne: 1526–1536 – son of John, son of Cathal
- Maelmordha, son of John O'Reilly, East Breifne: 1537–1565 – son of John, son of Cathal
- Hugh Conallagh O'Reilly, son of Maelmordha O'Reilly, East Breifne: 1583 – son of Maelmordha, son of John
- John Roe, son of Hugh Conallagh O'Reilly, East Breifne: 1583–1596
- Philip, son of Hugh O'Reilly, East Breifne: 1596–1596
- Edmond, son of Maelmordha O'Reilly, East Breifne: 1596–1601 – son of Maelmordha, son of John, son of Cathal
- Owen, son of Hugh Conallagh O'Reilly, East Breifne: 1601–1609

== See also ==
- Gaelic nobility of Ireland
- Bélchú
- Beara-Breifne Way
- https://royalcourtofbreifne.org/ Royal Court of Breifne
