= Muirgius mac Tommaltach =

Historical Irish provincial king

Muirgius mac Tommaltach was King of Connacht (796–815). He was preceded by Colla mac Fergus and superseded by Mael Cothaid.

Mac Tommaltach hosted a meeting in 814 with the Abbott of Clonmacnois. He "destroyed" Loch Riach.

== See also ==
- History of Ireland
