= Cathal mac Muiredaig =

Cathal mac Muiredaig Muillethan (died 735) was a King of Connacht from the Uí Briúin branch of the Connachta. He was the son of Muiredach Muillethan mac Fergusso (died 702), a previous king and brother of Indrechtach mac Muiredaig Muillethan (died 723). He was of the Síl Muiredaig sept of the Uí Briúin. He ruled from 728 to 735.

According to a poem on The Kings of Connacht, Cathal seized the kingdom without being the heir. The annals record a battle of the Connachta in 732 where Muiredach mac Indrechtaig, son of his brother was slain.

Cathal was ancestor of the Síl Cathail sept which carved out lands in the Co. Roscommon area from the Ui Maine. His sons included two kings of Connacht: Dub-Indrecht mac Cathail (d. 768) and Artgal mac Cathail (d. 792); as well as Dub-Díbeirg (d. 787) and Fogartach (fl. 789).

== See also ==
- Kings of Connacht
