= Rogallach mac Uatach =

Rogallach mac Uatach (died 649) was a king of Connacht from the Uí Briúin branch of the Connachta. He was the son of Uatu mac Áedo (d. 600), a previous king. He married Muireann, the great-great-great-granddaughter of Túathal Máelgarb, High King of Ireland (died 544). He acquired the throne of Connacht after defeating the previous king Colmán mac Cobthaig (d. 622) of the Ui Fiachrach Aidhne, who was slain at the Battle of Cennbag (Cambo, County Roscommon) in 622. Professor Francis Byrne believes he is the first reasonable representative of this branch to be said to have held the throne of Connacht

According to Geoffrey Keating, Rogallach killed his brother's son treacherously at a meeting of whom he feared might demand the succession. He also developed an incestuous relationship with his daughter much to the dismay of his wife Muireann (of the Cenél Coirpri) who complained to the high king. The intercession of Saint Feichin was not enough to make him stop his bad ways. One day while hunting a deer with his javelin he wounded the animal. He followed it only to discover that a couple of slaves had already killed the deer and cut it up at which he demanded the slaves hand over the venison. The result was that the slaves killed him on his white horse.

His actual killer recorded in the Annals of Tigernach was Máel Brigte mac Mothlachán of the Corco Cullu who were a subject tribe of the Ciarraige who were still the major population group in the Mag nAí, the home territory of the Ui Briun.

His known sons included Cathal mac Rogallaig (d. 680) who avenged his death; Cellach mac Rogallaig (d. 705), a later king of Connacht; and Fergus mac Rogallaig (d. 654) ancestor of the main ruling line of the Ui Briun Ai.

== See also ==
- Kings of Connacht
