= Cathal mac Tadg =

Cathal mac Tadg was King of Connacht, 973.

Cathal only briefly succeeded his brother. Murchadh Glunillar ua Flaithbheartach, King of Aileach, invaded Connacht and gave battle to Cathal at Ceis Corran. Cathal was killed as were some of his prime vassals - "Geibheannach, son of Aedh, lord of Ui-Maine; Tadhg, son of Muircheartach, chief of Ui-Diarmada; Murchadh, son of Flann, son of Glethneachan, chief of Clann-Murchadha; and Seirridh Ua Flaithbheartaigh, with a countless number along with them."

Murchadh totally plundered Connacht afterwards, while Cathal was succeeded as King of Connacht by Cathal mac Conchobar mac Taidg.

Preceded by Conchobar mac Tadg	King of Connacht; 973 - 973	Succeeded by Cathal mac Conchobar mac Taidg
