= Nath Í mac Fiachrach =

5th century Irish king

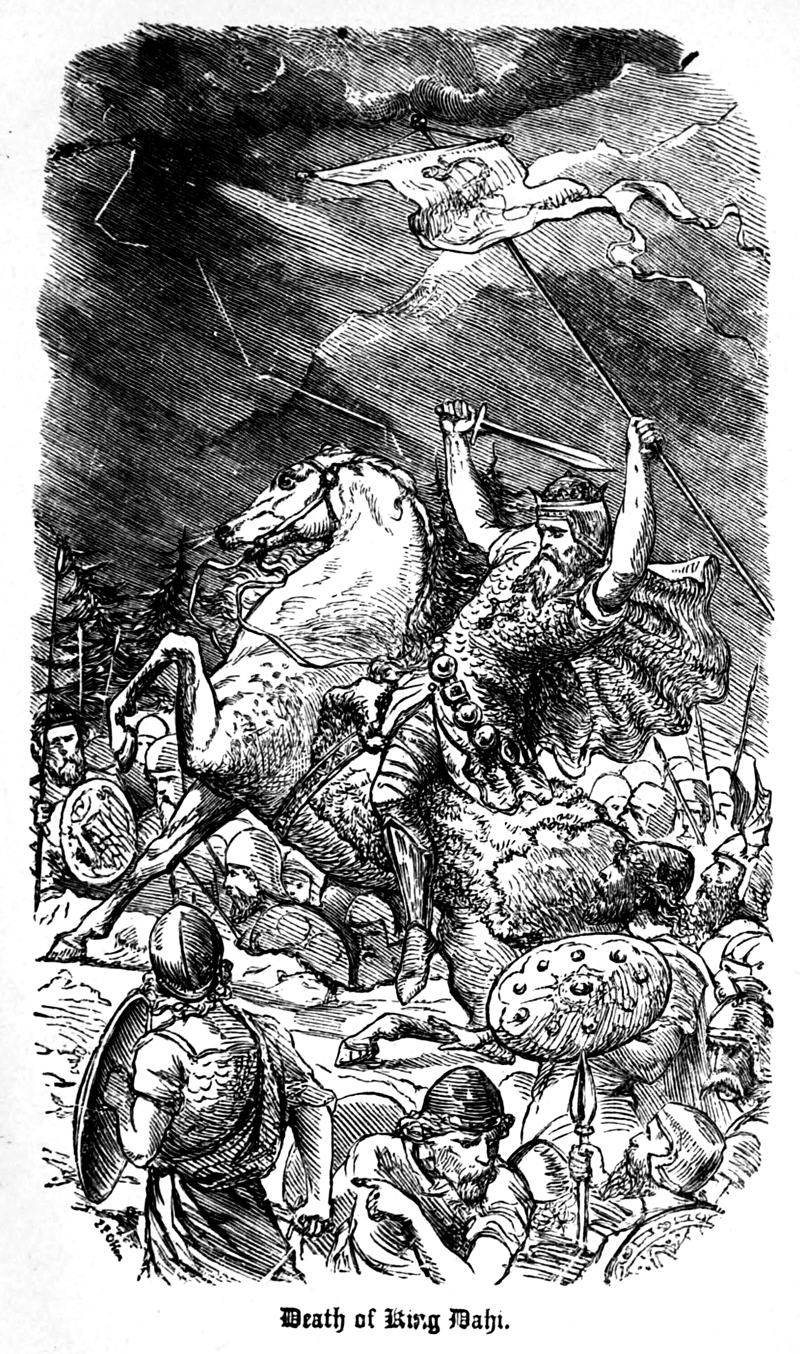
"Death of King Dahi", illustration by John Fergus O'Hea from A. M. Sullivan, The Story of Ireland, 1867

Nath Í, also known as Dathí, son of Fiachrae, son of Eochaid Mugmedon, was a semi-historical Irish king of the 5th century, the father of the likely-historical king Ailill Molt and the ancestor of the Uí Fiachrach dynasties of early medieval Connacht. His mother was Béḃinn. According to legend, he was a High King of Ireland, and died after being struck by lightning while on an expedition to the Alps.

== History ==
Historically, Nath Í is primarily known for his descendants. His son Ailill Molt was likely a historical 5th century king. Two more sons, Echu and Fiachnae, were the ancestors of the Uí Fiachrach Aidni and the Uí Fiachrach Muaide respectively, both early medieval dynasties in Connacht. A fourth son, Amalgaid, was the ancestor of Tírechán, the 7th century bishop and biographer of St. Patrick.

Nath Í's own status and position are disputed. Most early Irish sources, including the Lebor Gabála Érenn, the Annals of the Four Masters and Geoffrey Keating's Foras Feasa ar Éirinn, place him in the traditional list of High Kings of Ireland, after Niall of the Nine Hostages and before Niall's son Lóegaire, with Nath Í's son, Ailill Molt, succeeding Lóegaire. However, he is not included in the earliest list of kings of Tara, the Baile Chuinn Chétchathaig. T. F. O'Rahilly argues that Nath Í did not rule at Tara, but was in fact a king of the province of Connacht, although he accepts that Ailill Molt was a king of Tara. However, Nath Í's name does not appear on the Connacht regnal lists, and Ailill Molt's does. T. M. Charles-Edwards considers it a possibility that neither were kings of Tara, but that both were included later, when members of the Uí Fiachrach dynasties were prominent and it was felt politically necessary to include their ancestors in the ranks of former High Kings.

An early list of Nath Í's battles takes him outside Ireland, including battles in Strathclyde and Kincardine in Scotland, and an expedition across the English Channel to the Alps. In the Annals of Ulster there is an entry for the year 445 which originally consisted solely of Nath Í's name. Later writers, presuming this to be his death notice, added the detail that he was struck by lightning in the Alps, circumstances also recounted in the Lebor Gabála, Keating and the Annals of the Four Masters, the latter of which dates it to 428. According to legend, his followers carried his body back to Ireland, winning ten battles on the way, and buried him at Cruachan, capital of Connacht. A standing stone said to mark his grave is part of the Rathcroghan complex of archeological sites near Tulsk in County Roscommon.

O'Rahilly and Francis J. Byrne observe out that Nath Í's death-tale is modelled on that of Niall of the Nine Hostages, and as with Niall, the early Irish name for Britain, Alba, may have been confused with Elpa, the Alps. O'Rahilly therefore concludes that "he was a king of Connacht in the first half of the fifth century, that he appears to have acquired fame in his day as a leader of predatory expeditions to Britain, and that he died in or about the year 445, and was probably buried at Cruachain."

== Legends ==
The medieval glossary Cóir Anmann ("the fitness of names") and Keating say his given name was Feradach, and that he was given the nickname dathí, "active, quick" because of his vigour in taking up arms. Keating adds that he had three wives: Fial, daughter of Eochaid; Eithne, daughter of Orach, the mother of Aill Molt; and Ruad, daughter of Airtech Uichtlethan, who died giving birth to another of his sons, Fiachrae Elgach. His other sons were Amalgaid, Echu and Cobthach.

According to legend, after the accession of Niall of the Nine Hostages as High King, there was a civil war between Niall's brothers Brión and Fiachrae, Nath Í's father, over the kingship of Connacht. Fiachrae was defeated and captured, but Nath Í continued the war and eventually defeated and killed Brión. Fiachrae was released and became king of Connacht.

A fuller version of his death-tale, as mentioned to in the annals, is found in the saga Aided Nath Í ("the death of Nath Í"), a later version of the Lebor Gabála, and Keating, in which he besieges a tower in which Forménus, king of Thrace, lives as a hermit, having forsaken his kingdom for a religious life. Forménus prays that God will punish him, and he is struck by lightning, although the Lebor Gabála adds that "scholars suppose" Forménus shot him with an arrow.

Preceded by Amalgaid mac Fiachrae	King of The Connachta ?–after-?	Succeeded by Ailill Molt
