= Tadg mac Cathail =

King of Connaught (died 956)

Tadg mac Cathail (died 956) was King of Connacht.

| Preceded by Cathal mac Conchobair | Kings of Connacht; 925–956 | Succeeded by Fergal Ua Ruairc |
