= Uatu mac Áedo =

Uatu mac Áedo (died 600) was a King of Connacht from the Uí Briúin branch of the Connachta. He was the son of Áed mac Echach Tirmcharna (d. 575). The kinglists place his reign after his father which would put his succession in the year in 575. Prof. Byrne preserves this arrangement but points out that the Annals of Ulster do not name him as king at his death obit and he does not agree that the early Uí Briúin kings held the overlordship in Connacht.

His son Rogallach mac Uatach (died 649) was a later King of Connacht.

== See also ==
- Kings of Connacht
