= Muiredach Muillethan =

8th-century Irish king

Muiredach Muillethan mac Fergusso (or Muiredach Mag Aí) (died 702) was a King of Connacht from the Uí Briúin Aí branch of the Uí Briúin. He was the grandson of Rogallach mac Uatach (died 649), a previous king. His sobriquet Muillethan means "broad-crowned".

== Overview ==
The annals report that his father Fergus (Muirgius) had been killed in 654 by the Uí Fiachrach Aidhne. His uncle Cathal mac Rogallaig is reported as dying in the year 680. The date of his accession to rule over the Uí Briúin is not known but must have been after the death of Cenn Fáelad mac Colgan (died 682) of the Uí Briúin Seóla.

The king lists vary in their order of kings in this period. The Laud Synchronisms place his reign after Fergal while the Book of Leinster places his reign much later. The Annals of Tigernach report a reign of 696-702 for Muiredach as king of Connacht succeeding Fergal Aidne mac Artgaile (died 696). Nothing is recorded of his reign however.

He was married to Cacht of the Corco Cullu (a minor tribe in Mag nAí), daughter of the slayer of his grandfather Rogallach. He was the ancestor of the Síol Muireadaigh of Connacht and his known sons were Indrechtach mac Muiredaig Muillethan (died 723) and Cathal mac Muiredaig Muillethan (died 735), both future kings of Connacht.

== Family tree ==
    Muiredach Muillethan
    |
    |____________________________________________________________________________
    |                                                                           |
    |                                                                           |
    Indrechtaig, died 723.                                                      Cathal
    |                                                                           |
    |____________________________________________________________               |__________________________________
    |                    |                     |      |         |               |             |       |           |
    |                    |                     |      |         |               |             |       |           | 
    Áed Balb (died 742)  Muiredach (died 732)  Tadg   Murgal    Medb            Dub Indrecht  Artgal  Dub Díbeirg Forgartach
                                             = ?              = Áed Oirdnide     d. 768.      d. 792.   d. 787.    fl. 789.
                                               |                |
                                               |                |
                                               Tipraiti         Niall Caille
                                               |                |
                                               |                |
                                         Síol Muireadaigh   Áed Findliath
