= Art Uallach Ua Ruairc =

Art Uallach Ua Ruairc ("Art the Proud;" died 1046) was King of Connacht.

Preceded by Tadg in Eich Gil	Kings of Connacht; 1030–1046	Succeeded by Áed in Gai Bernaig
