= Uí Fiachrach Muaidhe =

Familial unit in medieval Celtic Ireland

The Uí Fiachrach Muaidhe were a branch of the Uí Fiachrach dynasty of the Connachta in medieval Ireland. They were centred on the Moy River valley of modern-day County Mayo, Ireland. At its largest extent, their territory, Tír Fhíacrach Múaidhe (now in County Sligo) included the territories of Irrus Domnann and Tír Amhlaidh now in County Mayo. This branch of the Ui Fiachrach was descended from Fiachnae, a brother of Ailill Molt (died 484), high king of Ireland. Later their chief sept was the Ó Dubhda (O'Dowd), princes at Carn Amalgaidh, near Killala, County Mayo.

They provided some Kings of Connacht, including:

- Dúnchad Muirisci mac Tipraite (died 683)
- Indrechtach mac Dúnchado Muirisci (died 707)
- Ailill Medraige mac Indrechtaig (died 764)
- Donn Cothaid mac Cathail (died 773)

== See also ==
- Kings of Connacht
- Kings of Ui Fiachrach Muaidhe
