= Áed mac Echach =

Áed mac Echach Tirmcharna (died 575) was a King of Connacht from the Uí Briúin branch of the Connachta. He was the son of Echu Tirmcharna mac Fergusso (died ca. 556). He came to the throne in the year 557 and ruled until 575.

The slaying of one of his sons was the cause of a war with the high-king Diarmait mac Cerbaill (died 563). Geoffrey Keating states that Diarmait held a feast at Tara at which Áed's son Curnán mac Áedo (died 559) slew a nobleman. Curnán then put himself under the protection of Forguss and Domnall mac Muichertaig of the Cenél nEógain of the northern Uí Néill who placed him under the protection of their kinsman Saint Columba. However Diarmait had Curnán executed for violating laws of Tara in 559. According to the Annals of the Four Masters, Curnán was torn from the hands of Columba. As a result, Columba organized a confederacy of the northern Uí Néill including the Cenél Conaill with Áed of Connacht against Diarmait.

In 560, the Battle of Cúl Dreimne (in County Sligo) was fought by this alliance against Diarmait. The Annals of the Four Masters mention that the prayers of Columba prevailed over the druids of Diarmait and he was defeated. T.M. Charles-Edwards places this battle in later Cenel Caipre Droma Cliab territory in the region between the Northern Uí Néill and the Connachta stating that Diarmait was on the offensive and tried to cut the allies off. He also states that the true cause of this battle was probably a dispute over the succession to Diarmait.

Byrne doubts the legitimacy of the early Uí Briúin genealogies and goes so far as to doubt that these early kings of Connacht were even of the Uí Briúin. He cites the reference in the annals to the death of Áed in 575 who is said to be killed by the Uí Briúin and to a reference in the Annals of Innisfallen that he gave Enach Dúin (Annaghdown on Lough Corrib) to Saint Brendan of Clonfert. He doubts that a ruler from the Mag nAí region would be able to make this gift. However, Hubert Knox believed the Uí Briúin in fact originated near Annaghdown, which would explain this situation. Charles-Edwards on the other hand believes that the Uí Briúin were set up in Connacht by Diarmait mac Cerbaill as a balance to the Uí Fiachrach before Áed joined the alliance against him.

He was succeeded by his son Uatu mac Áedo (died 600).

== See also ==
- Kings of Connacht
