= Magheraghanrush Court Tomb =

- Tuama Cúirte Mhachaire Chon Rois (Irish)
- Deerpark Court Tomb
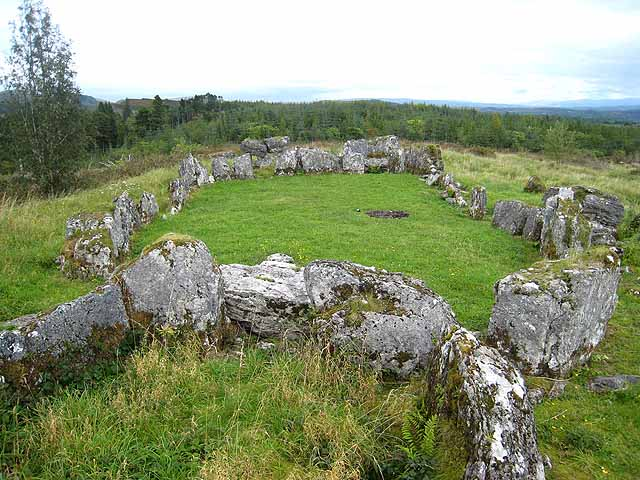
- The cairn in 2008

- Location in Ireland
- 54.279326°N 8.381069°W
- Type: court cairn
- Location: County Sligo, Ireland

History
- Built: c. 3000 BC

Site notes
- Elevation: 137 m (449 ft)

National monument of Ireland
- Official name: Magheraghanrush or Deerpark
- Reference no.: 377

Magheraghanrush Court Tomb is a court cairn and National Monument located in County Sligo, Ireland.

== Location ==
Magheraghanrush Court Tomb is located 6 km (3.7 mi) east of Sligo.

== History ==
Magheraghanrush Court Tomb was built c. 3000 BC. It may have first been a simple construction with U-shaped court; the east part was added later.

Local legend has it as a Giant's Grave or Druid's Altar, or the burial site of Eógan Bél, King of Connacht, although the Middle Irish poem Caithréim Cellaig says he was buried on Knocknarea and reburied on an island in Lough Gill.

Unburned animal and human bones were discovered on the site as well as a flint flake.

== Description ==
The tomb is very large, 30 m (100 ft) long. The court is oval and located in the centre with two chambers at one end and a single chamber at the other, giving it the appearance of a man from above. The central court is not a perfect oval but is crooked in the middle, indicating that there was originally one court cairn which was then added to. Some of the uprights had lintels, giving it the name of "the Irish Stonehenge."
