= Dúnchad Muirisci =

Dúnchad Muirisci mac Tipraite (died 683) was a King of Connacht from the Ui Fiachrach branch of the Connachta. He was of the Ui Fiachrach Muaidhe sept based along the River Moy. This line was descended from Fiachnae, a brother of Ailill Molt who lived about two centuries earlier than Dúnchad Muirisci.

His epithet shows that he won control of the Muiresc region on the Moy and his line provided the later kings of Ui Fiachrach. Both the king lists and the annals attest to his rule as king in the years 682–683. However, they give his father as Máeldub whereas genealogies such as the Book of Ballymote name Máeldub as his grandfather and Tipraite as his father.

The annals record that he was killed in 683 but do not mention who was responsible. His known sons were Indrechtach mac Dúnchado (died 707), a king of Connacht, and Aillil.

== See also ==
- Kings of Connacht
