= Aughris =

Coastal area of County Sligo, Ireland

Coordinates: 54.27474°N 8.76101°W

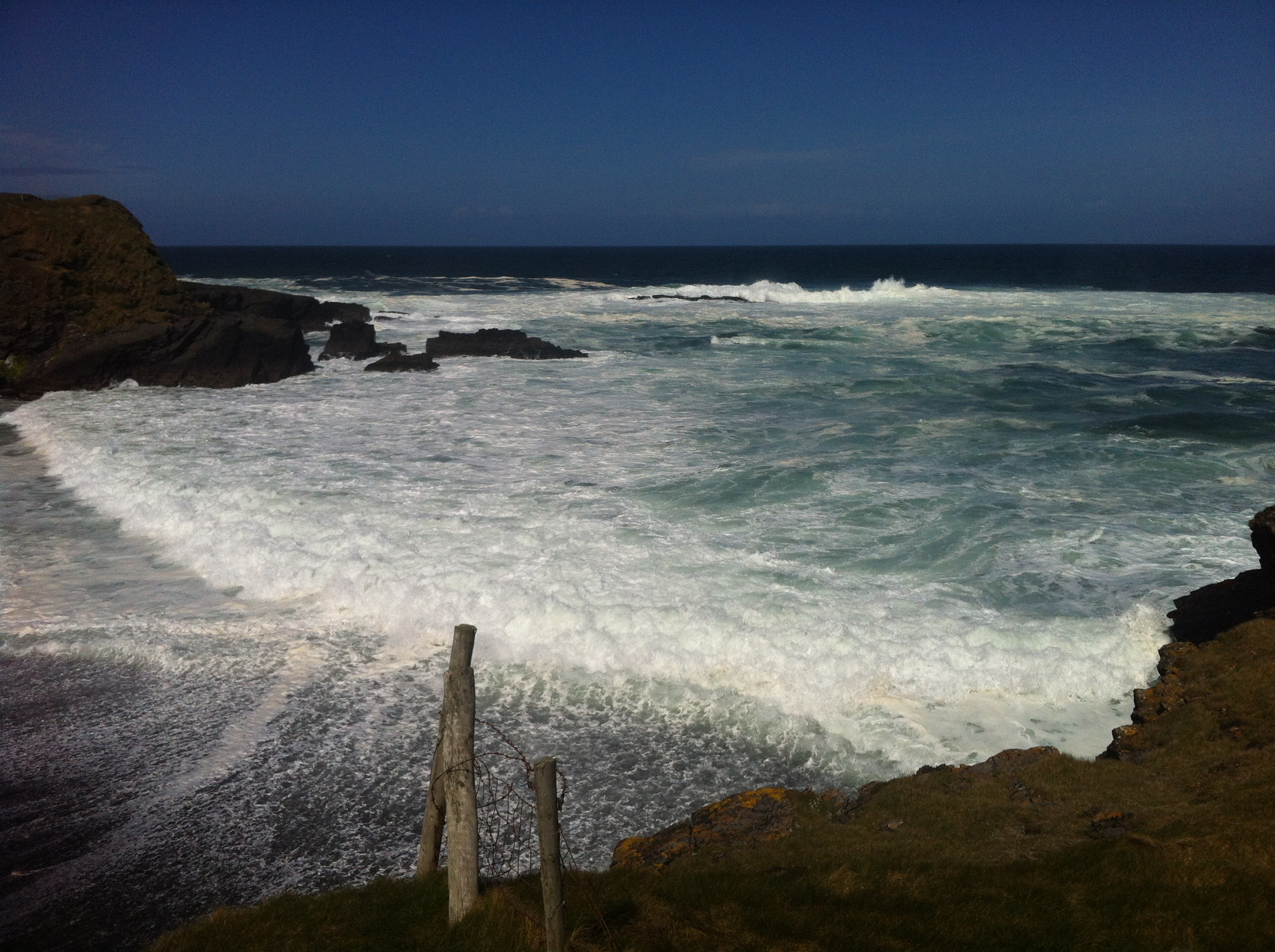
Inlet at Auhgris.

Aughris (Irish: Eachrois, meaning 'point of the horses') is a coastal townland in County Sligo, in the west of Ireland. It is also the name given to a prominent headland that includes the townlands of Aughris, Garryduff, Kilrusheighter and Rathglass. The area has been settled since at least medieval times and there are several archaeological remains in the vicinity.

Aughris now has a small harbour used by inshore fishermen and a public house known as Beach Bar. The geology of the area is limestone, with examples of fossilized coral fauna visible in exposed coastal areas.

A tiny clachán-type village located close to the coast is now largely abandoned. Most existing houses cluster near the harbour and public house.
