= Dub-Indrecht mac Cathail =

Dub-Indrecht mac Cathail (died 768) was a King of Connacht from the Uí Briúin branch of the Connachta. He was the son of Cathal mac Muiredaig Muillethan (died 735), a previous king. He was of the Síl Cathail sept of the Ui Briun and ruled from 764 to 768.

In 766, Dub-Indrecht defeated the Conmaicne Cuile Tolad at the Battle of Sruthair. His grandson, Fergus mac Fothaid (died 843), was a later king of Connacht.

== See also ==
- Kings of Connacht
