= Indrechtach mac Dúnchado =

Indrechtach mac Dúnchado Muirisci (died 707) was a King of Connacht from the Ui Fiachrach Muaidhe branch of the Connachta. He was the son of a previous king Dúnchad Muirisci mac Tipraite (died 683). He reigned from 705 to 707.

His predecessor Cellach mac Rogallaig (died 705) had defeated an attempt by the northern Ui Neill to assert their supremacy at the Battle of Corann in 703. In revenge the northern Ui Neill under Fergal mac Máele Dúin of the Cenél nEógain; Fergal mac Loingsig of the Cenél Conaill; and Conall Menn of the Cenél Coirpri defeated and slew Indrechtach in 707. The Annals of Tigernach refer to Indrechtach as "king of the Three Connachta" which indicated the beginnings of a true provincial over-kingship in hostility to Ui Neill pretensions.

Indrechtach's son Ailill Medraige mac Indrechtaig (died 764) was also a King of Connaught.

== See also ==
- Kings of Connacht
