= Fergal ua Ruairc =

Fergal Ua Ruairc (died 967) was King of Connacht, Ireland. The annals state that, in 961, he won the battle of Catinchi.

Preceded by Tadg mac Cathail	Kings of Connacht; 956–967	Succeeded by Conchobar mac Tadg
