= Ailill Inbanda =

Ailill Inbanda mac Eógain (died 549) was a king of Connacht from the Ui Fiachrach branch of the Connachta. He was the son and successor of Eógan Bél, who was slain by the northern Ui Neill in 542. His nickname Inbanda means "womanish" or effeminate or it could mean "the vigorous" which is more likely (see eDill).

His father's feud with the northern Ui Neill continued. He himself was slain at the Battle of Cúl Conaire in Cera, (County Mayo) along with his brother Áed Fortobol ("the strong") by Fergus and Domnall of the Cenél nEógain, sons of Muirchertach mac Ercae. However Byrne believes this is a misinterpretation and that he was slain by his Fir Chera cousins of the Ui Fiachrach who were descended from a Macc Ercae as it was in their territory this battle was fought.

== See also ==
- Kings of Connacht
