= Cathal mac Conchobar mac Taidg =

Cathal mac Conchobar mac Taidg (died 1010) was king of Connacht.

== Family tree ==
- Cathal mac Conchobar mac Taidg (d. 1010)
  - Dub Choblaigh m. Brian Boru, High King of Ireland (d. 1014)
    - Domnall?
      - Diarmait (d. 1051)
  - Tadg in Eich Gil, King of Connacht (d. 1030) m. ?
    - Áed in Gai Bernaig, King of Connacht (d. 1067)
  - Brian (d. 1029)
  - Conchobor (fl. 1029)
  - In Cléirech (fl. 1044)
    - Tadg (d. 1056)
    - Conchobar (d. 1069)
  - Tadhg Direach
    - An Gilla Lónach

Preceded by Cathal mac Tadg	Kings of Connacht; 973–1010	Succeeded by Tadg in Eich Gil
