= Indrechtach mac Muiredaig =

Indrechtach mac Muiredaig Muillethan (died 723) was a King of Connacht from the Uí Briúin branch of the Connachta. He was the son of Muiredach Muillethan mac Fergusso (died 702), a previous king. He was of the Síl Muiredaig sept of the Uí Briúin.

The king-lists for this period are contradictory but the Laud Synchronisms give him a reign of 16 years. The annals mention him as king at his death obit in 723. Only the Chronicum Scotorum gives Domnall mac Cathail (died 715) a reign in between Indrechtach mac Muiredaig and Indrechtach mac Dúnchado Muirisci (died 707) and it is possible that Indrechtach mac Muiredaig was king from 707. His reign saw the consolidation of the Ui Briun as the dominant dynasty in Connaught. One event which occurred during his reign was the defeat of the Corco Baiscind, a Thomond tribe, by the Connachta in 721. The annals do not specify what Connachta were victors.

Indrechtach died peacefully as a pilgrim to Clonmacnoise. This monastery favored the Ui Briun expansion. His known sons were Áed Balb mac Indrechtaig (died 742), a king of Connacht; Muiredach (died 732); Tadg; and Murgal. A daughter of Indrechtach named Medb is said by the Banshechas to have married Áed Oirdnide and to have been the mother of Niall Caille

== See also ==
- Kings of Connacht

== Bibliography ==
- Annals of Tigernach
- Chronicum Scotorum
- Francis John Byrne, Irish Kings and High-Kings
- Laud Synchronisms
- The Chronology of the Irish Annals, Daniel P. McCarthy
