= Cathal Ó Conchobair =

Irish bishop

Cathal Ó Conchobair was a 14th century Irish bishop.

Also known as Carolus, he was formerly Abbot of Loch Cé, near Boyle, County Roscommon. Ó Conchobair was elected in September 1307; and consecrated in October 1307. He received possession of the temporalities on 12 March 1309. Ó Conchobair resigned in 1310 and died in 1343.
