= Brión mac Echach Muigmedóin =

4th or 5th century legendary Irish king

Brión (or Brían), son of Eochaid Mugmedón, was a legendary and possibly historical Irish king, fl. 4th/5th century.

== Biography ==
The older half-brother of Niall Noígíallach (Niall of the Nine Hostages) and one of the three brothers whose descendants were known as the Connachta, Brión is said to have been king of Connacht. According to the traditional Irish chronology, his father died in 362. Brión's descendants, the Uí Briúin, gave rise to many Kings of Connacht and its ruling families over the next thousand years. A descendant of his via the Uí Briúin Ai was Tairrdelbach Ua Conchobair, who became High King of Ireland in 1166.

"The Violent Death of Crimthann mac Fidaig and of the Three Sons of Eochaid Muigmedón" gives the story of the sons of Eochaid Mugmedón. According to this saga, Brión was the favorite son of his mother Mongfind, sister of Crimthann mac Fidaig (d. 367), the king of Munster. She wanted Brión to succeed Eochaid but upon his death, war broke out with her stepson Niall Noígíallach (d. 405). When she realized the war was not going in her favor she arranged for Crimthann to become high king and sent Brión away to learn soldiering. On Brión's return after seven years, Mongfind poisoned her brother in order to get the throne for Brión.

However, Niall acquired the throne and made Brión his champion and levier of his rents and hostages. Brión took the throne of Connacht leading to war with his brother Fiachrae. Brión defeated Fiachrae at the Battle of Damchluain (near Tuam, County Galway) who was taken captive to Tara. However, Fiachrae's son Nath Í rallied forces and defeated Brión who was slain at a second Battle of Damchluain. Brión was buried at Ross Camm. Fiachrae was released and became the new king of Connacht.

== Descendants ==
According to Tirechan, Patrick visited the "halls of the sons of Brión" at Duma Selchae in Mag nAí, but does not give their names. An equivalent passage in the Vita Tripartita, possibly of 9th-century origin, names six sons. "A series of later sources dating from the eleventh century onward, meanwhile, enumerates Brión's progeny as no less than twenty-four. No doubt the increasing power of the Ui Briúin was responsible for this dramatic swelling of the ranks, as tribes and dynasties newly coming under Ui Briúin sway were furnished with ancestries that would link them genealogically to their overlords. Into this category fall the Ui Briúin Umaill, and likely also the Ui Briúin Ratha and Ui Briúin Sinna." (p. 485, "Ui Briúin", Anne Connon, in "Medieval Ireland: An Encyclopedia").

== Children ==
- Duach Galach
