= Fiachrae =

Fiachrae was an Irish prince, the son of the high king Eochaid Mugmedón (d.362) by his wife Mongfind, sister of Crimthann mac Fidaig (d.367). He was ancestor of the Uí Fiachrach dynasties of Connacht. He lived in the late 4th century.

"The Violent Death of Crimthann mac Fidaig and of the Three Sons of Eochaid Muigmedón" gives the story of the sons of Eochaid Mugmedón. According to this saga, his half-brother the high king Niall Noigiallach (d.405) made Fiachrae's full brother Brión his champion and Brion seized the kingship of Connacht. This led to war between Brion and Fiachrae and they fought a battle at Damchluain (near Tuam, County Galway). Fiachrae was captured and taken to Tara. However Fiachrae's son Nath Í rallied forces and defeated and slew Brion at a second battle at Damchluain.

Fiachrae was now released by Niall and given Brion's position as champion and levier of his hostages and rents. With his brother Ailill, he then went to take hostages from Munster. They defeated Eochaid mac Crimthainn and took loot and hostages. However, Fiachrae was severely wounded and died at Ferrach in Meath on the way home. The hostages of Munster were buried alive with him as a tribute to him.
