= Uí Fiachrach =

Irish family

The Uí Fiachrach (Modern Irish: Uí Fhiachrach, pronounced [iː ˈiəxɾˠəx]) were a royal dynasty who originated in, and whose descendants later ruled, the coicead or fifth of Connacht (a western province of Ireland) at different times from the mid-first millennium onwards. They claimed descent from Fiachrae, an older half-brother of Niall Noigiallach or Niall of the Nine Hostages. Fiachrae and his two full brothers, Brion and Ailill, were the collective ancestors of the Connachta dynasty that eventually became the new name of the province. Their mother was Mongfind.

== History ==
The other two dynasties within the Connachta were the Uí Briúin – descendants of Brion – and the Uí nAilello – descendants of Ailill. The latter sank into obscurity at an early stage but both the Uí Fiachrach and Ui Briuin and their many sub-septs featured prominently in the history of Connacht for one thousand years. In the 12th century, an Ui Briuin descendant, Toirdhealbhach Mór Ua Conchobhair became High King of Ireland. Toirdhealbhach's son Ruaidri mac Tairrdelbach Ua Conchobair, would succeed him to become last the Gaelic High King of Ireland.

The Uí Fiachrach separated into two distinct branches, situated widely apart from each other. The Ui Fiachrach Aidhne settled in the kingdom of Aidhne and established themselves as its new ruling dynasty. The Uí Fiachrach Muaidhe were based along the River Moy in what is now part of County Mayo and County Sligo. It appears that they once constituted a single overkingdom, and ruled or took tribute from the older tribes and nations situated between Aidhne and Muaide, but lost their grip on power by the early 8th century leaving them confined to their own strict territory.

Uí Fiachrach Aidhne was bounded on the north and east by the powerful independent kingdom of Hy-Many or Ui Maine; to the west by Lough Lurgan (Galway Bay) and the Corco Mo Druad (Corcomroe); and to the south by Déisi Tuisceart (later the Dál gCais, later still the O'Brian's of Thomond). The territorial gains made by the Uí Fiachrach were lost and the kingdom seems to have reverted to something of its original size for its subsequent history.

For eight hundred years up to the mid-12th century its kings were from the[Cenel Guire] the Clan O'Cleary. Their kinsmen Clan O'Shaughnessy and Clan O'Hynes remained rulers of the territory until the land confiscations of the late 1690s and early 18th century.

Uí Fiachrach Muaidhe covered all of what is now county Sligo and much of north and central County Mayo. In 982 Aedh ua Dubhda (Aedh grandson of Dubhda), King of Uí Fiachrach Muaidhe, died "an untroubled death". He was the first of his dynasty to use the surname O Dubhda (anglicised to O'Dowd, Dowd). Brian, Melaghlin Carragh, Connor Oge, and Murtogh mac Connor O Dubhda fought at the Second Battle of Athenry in 1316, only Brian surviving. However, by the 14th century their power was much reduced, as was their territory which now almost entirely consisted of the barony of Tireragh. For this reason they were no longer referred to as Kings, but as Taoiseach (Chieftain) of Uí Fiachrach Muaidhe.

Here the family became sponsors of the Clan Mac Fhir Bhisigh, a family of hereditary historians and judges. Because of this, the O Dubhda is singular in having his inauguration ceremony preserved in an old book, the Great Book of Lecan. Written between 1397 and 1418 at Enniscrone in Tireagh, it was commissioned by Tadhg Riabhach O Dubhda.

A later Tadhg O Dubhda, Tadhg Buí, became Taoiseach in 1595. In 1601 he led the men of Uí Fiachrach south to Kinsale, never to return. A tradition states that "he survived the battle and settled in Co. Kerry, where his family later became known as Doody". The last true O Dubhda of Uí Fiachrach was Dathi Og, patron and lord of Dubhaltach MacFhirbhisigh. Bearers of the name are still found scattered through Sligo, Mayo and Galway.

== Genealogy of the early Uí Fiachrach ==
Bold print indicates Kings of Connacht

           Eochaid Mugmedon
          =Mongfind       + Cairenn
             |                  |
    _________|_________         |
    |        |        |         |
    |        |        |         |
    Brion Fiachrae Ailill     Niall, died c.450.
             |                   (Ui Néill)
    _________|________________________
    |                 |             |
    |                 |             |
    Amalgaid          Nath Í       Macc Ercae
                      |
   ___________________|_____________________
   |           |                           |
   |           |                           |
   Fiachnae    Ailill Molt, d.482.         Echu
   |                                       |
   |                                       |
  (Uí Fiachrach Muaidhe) (Uí Fiachrach Aidhne)

== Uí Fiachrach Muaidhe ==
   Fiachnae
   |
   |
   Elgach
   |
   |
   Maeldubh
   |
   |
   Tipraite
   |
   |
   Dunchad Muirisci
   |
   |_______________________________________________
   |                              |                |
   |                              |                |
   Indrechtach, d.707.            mac Dunchad Ailill
   |                              |                |
   |                              |                |
   Ailill Medraige, d.764.        Tipraite, d.719 Cathal
   |                                               |
   |                                               |
   Cathal, d.816.                                 Donn Cothaid mac Cathail, d.787.

== Uí Fiachrach Aidhne ==
   Echu
   |
   |
   Eogan
   |
   |
   Conall
   |
   |____________
   |          |
   |          |
   Gabran Goibnenn, fl. 538.
   |
   |
   Cobthach
   |
   |
   Colman, d. 622.
   |
   |_____________________________________
   |                                   |
   |                                   |
   Laidgnen/Loingsech, d. 655.         Guaire Aidne, d. 663.
                                       |
   ____________________________________|
   |                                   |
   |                                   |
   Muirchertach Nar, d.668.            Artgal
                                       |
                                       |
                                       Fergal Aidne, d. 696.

== Sources ==
- Byrne, Francis John (1973). Irish Kings and High Kings. Dublin.
- MacFhirbhisigh, Dubhaltach; O Muraile, Nollaig, editor (2004). Leabhar Genealach. The Great Book of Irish Genealogies. Dublin: DeBurca. (Alternate names by which it may be referenced include Leabhar Mor nGenealach, and Leabhar Mor na nGenealach)
- http://www.fatherdowd.net/dowdstuff/dowdclan.htm
- https://news.yahoo.com/s/nm/20060117/sc_nm/science_ireland_dc
