= Uí Briúin =

Royal dynasty of Connacht, Ireland

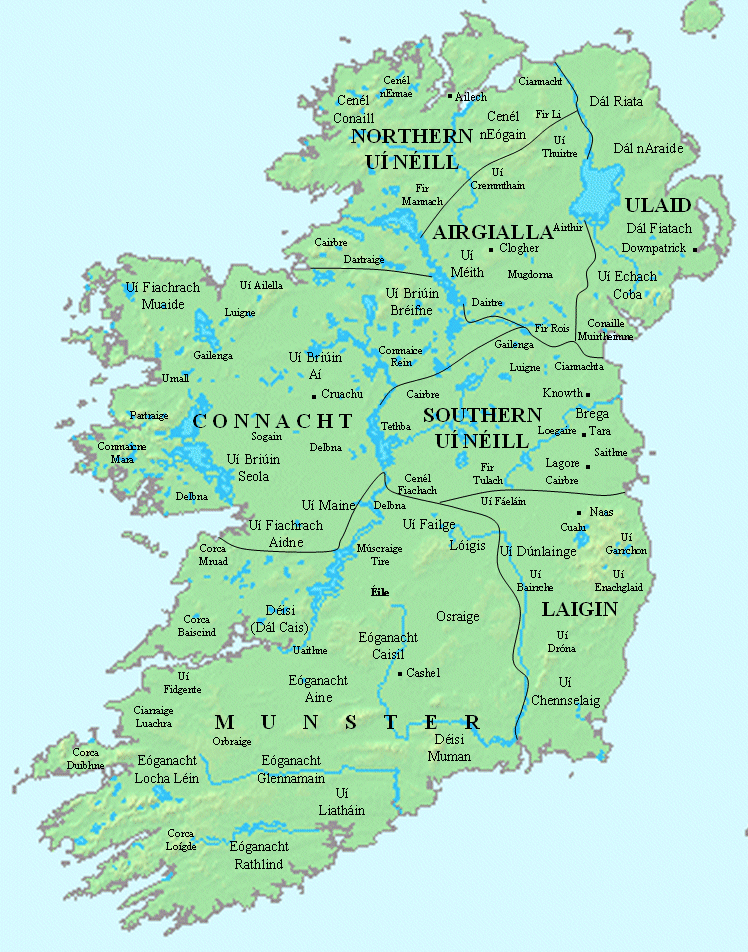
Early peoples and kingdoms of Ireland, c.800

The Uí Briúin were a royal dynasty of Connacht. Their eponymous apical ancestor was Brión, son of Eochaid Mugmedon and Mongfind, and an elder half brother of Niall of the Nine Hostages. They formed part of the Connachta, along with the Uí Fiachrach and Uí Ailello, putative descendants of Eochaid Mugmedon's sons Fiachra and Ailill. The Uí Ailello were later replaced as the third of the Three Connachta, through genealogical sleight of hand, by the Uí Maine.

== History ==
Connacht was ruled in early times by the Uí Fiachrach, the Uí Briúin only becoming the dominant force in Connacht in the 7th and 8th centuries.

The Uí Briúin divided into multiple septs, the three major ones being:

- The Uí Briúin Aí, named for the region they controlled—Mag nAí, the lands around the ancient centre of Connacht, Cruachan in modern County Roscommon. The most notable sept of the Uí Briúin Ai was the Síol Muireadaigh, from whom the ruling families of Ó Conchubhair (O'Connor) and MacDermot descended.
- The Uí Briúin Bréifne, whose high medieval kingdom of Bréifne lay in modern County Cavan and County Leitrim. The Ó Ruairc (O'Rourke) dynasty was the senior sept of the Uí Briúin Bréifne. Other septs included The Ó Raghallaigh (O'Reilly), Mág Tighearnán (McKiernan) and Mág Samhradháin (McGovern).
- The Uí Briúin Seóla, who were centred on Maigh Seóla in modern County Galway. The Ó Flaithbheartaigh kings of Iar Connacht and their kin, the Clann Cosgraigh, belong to this branch.

The Uí Briúin kings of Connacht were drawn exclusively from these three branches.

According to Tírechán, Saint Patrick visited the "halls of the sons of Brión" at Duma Selchae (located by John O'Donovan in Mag nAí and alternatively by Roderic O'Flaherty near Loch Cime), but does not give their names. An equivalent passage in the Vita Tripartita, possibly of 9th-century origin, names six sons. "A series of later sources dating from the eleventh century onward, meanwhile, enumerates Brion's progeny as no less than twenty-four. No doubt the increasing power of the Uí Briúin was responsible for this dramatic swelling of the ranks, as tribes and dynasties newly coming under Uí Briúin sway were furnished with ancestries that would link them genealogically to their overlords. Into this category fall the Uí Briúin Umaill and likely also the Uí Briúin Ratha and Uí Briúin Sinna."

== Geographic origins ==
While Francis Byrne and John O'Donovan believed the dynasty originated in Mag nAí, Roderic O'Flaherty and John Colgan related traditions of Saints Patrick and Felartus visiting the sons of Brión in Maigh Seóla. This confusion surrounding the location of Mag Selce as mentioned in the Tripartite caused Nicholls to suggest that the geographical origin of the Uí Briúin was moved for political reasons to near Cruachan by the time of Tírechán. MacCotter also points out that when the Uí Briúin were purportedly beginning their ascent, given the distributions of surrounding population groups, "the area originally available to Uí Briúin [in Mag nAí] cannot have consisted of more than the area of a few civil parishes", which may lend support to Nicholls' theory.

A story in the Silva Gadelica notes that during the legendary war between Brión and Fiachra, Fiachra's encampment was situated in Aidhne and Brión's lay in Damh-Chluain, which is stated to be in Uí Briúin Seóla and not far from Knockma Hill, west of Tuam. Although this is a legend, it may be an indication of the Uí Briúin's original homeland, as is Aidhne for the Uí Fiachrach. In addition, Hubert Knox, citing the Conmaicne's distribution and early status as subjects of the Uí Briúin, posited that the Uí Briúin originated in the barony of Clare in County Galway as the leading lineage of that people. Intriguingly, the Book of Ballymote calls Cellach mac Rogallaig "King of Conmaicne", a title also commonly taken by members of the Uí Briúin Bréifne branch in later centuries. The Maigh Seóla origin scenario is more consistent with the fact that early Uí Briúin kings (e.g. Cenn Fáelad mac Colgan and Cellach mac Rogallaig) had their residence on Loch Cime, as well as Áed mac Echach's donation of Annaghdown in the 6th century, which Byrne thought unlikely given Annaghdown's distance from Mag nAí. Furthermore, Cenn Fáelad mac Colgan is stated in the annals as having been killed by the Conmaicne Cuile, and the king-list in Laud 610 states that the same king died at the hands of "his own people". If both of these accounts are accurate, it would indicate that the Uí Briúin originated among the Conmaicne.

With the inclusion of Máenach mac Báethíne, ancestors of all three major branches of the dynasty are mentioned in the annals as residing or fighting in the Maigh Seóla region in the 7th century. The district to the east of Lough Corrib and the River Corrib is referred to as "Magh Ua mBriuin" at least as late as 1149. This likely denotes the domain of the "king of Uí Briúin", a title borne primarily by men of the Uí Briúin Seóla. As Knox points out, these kings were distinguished at an early date from the Síol Muireadaigh of central Roscommon in the Book of Rights, suggesting that the lands of the Uí Briúin Seóla were the original "Hy Briuin".

== Descendants ==
A recent study found that the Y-DNA SNP A259 is likely the defining mutation for the dynasty. While all of the branches share a common ancestor in the timeframe of Brión, there are no extant genealogies which correctly detail the first generations. Notably, the Uí Briúin Bréifne are more closely related to the Uí Briúin Seóla than they are to the Uí Briúin Aí.

== See also ==
- Nuala na Meadóige Ní Fionnachta
