= Connachta =

Group of medieval Irish dynasties

- Parent house: Dál Cuinn
- Country: Ireland
- Founded: 4th century AD
- Founder: Eochaid Mugmedon
- Current head: O'Conor Don
- Titles: Kings of Cruachan; Kings of Connacht; Kings of Tara; High Kings of Ireland; Kings of Breifne; peerage titles

The Connachta are a group of medieval Irish dynasties who claimed descent from the legendary High King Conn Cétchathach (Conn of the Hundred Battles). The modern western province of Connacht (Irish Cúige Chonnacht, province, literally "fifth", of the Connachta) takes its name from them, although the territories of the Connachta also included at various times parts of southern and western Ulster and northern Leinster. Their traditional capital was Cruachan (modern Rathcroghan, County Roscommon).

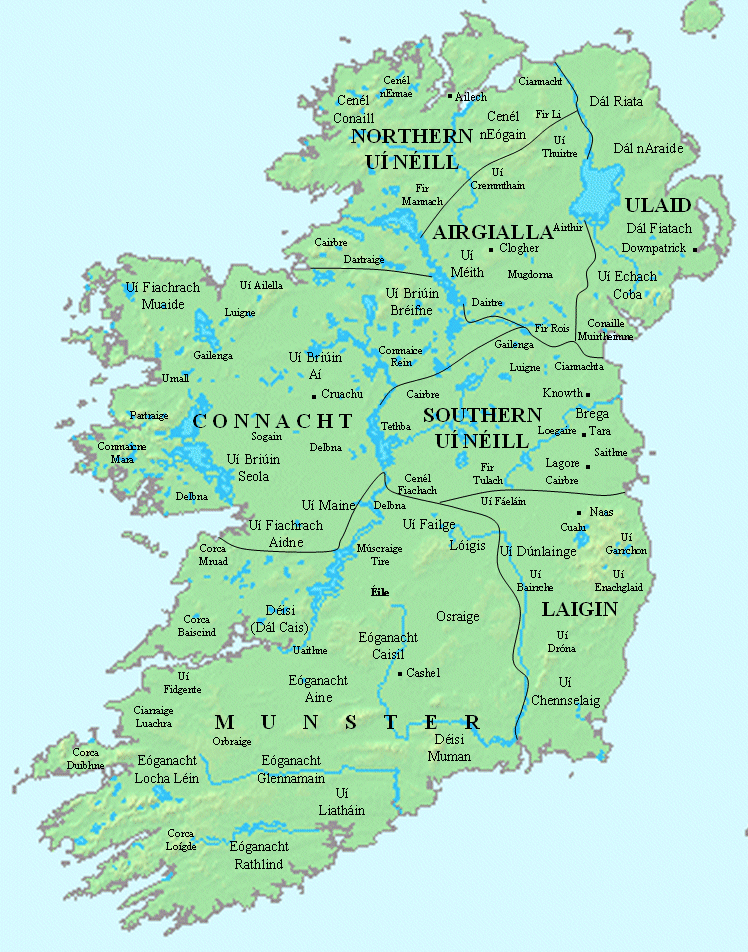
Early peoples and kingdoms of Ireland, c.800

== Origins ==
The use of the word cúige, earlier cóiced, literally "fifth", to denote a province indicates the existence of a pentarchy in prehistory, whose members are believed to have been population groups the Connachta, the Ulaid (Ulster) and the Laigin (Leinster), the region of Mumu (Munster), and the central kingdom of Mide. This pentarchy appears to have been broken up by the dawn of history in the early 5th century with the reduction of the Ulaid and the founding of new Connachta dynasties which expanded north and east.

Medieval Irish historical tradition traces these dynasties to the four or five sons of Eochaid Mugmedon: Brion, Ailill, Fiachrae, Fergus Caech (perhaps a literary addition), and Niall of the Nine Hostages. Four were ancestors of new Irish dynasties; those of Brión (the Uí Briúin), Fiachrae (the Uí Fiachrach) and Ailill (the Uí Ailello, later replaced by Uí Maine) were known as teóra Connachta, or the historical Three Connachta of the province itself; that of Niall, the Uí Néill, at first surpassed its parent dynasty, establishing or continuing the so-called High Kingship of Ireland at Tara, and became the most powerful dynasty in Ireland down to early modern times.

However David Sproule points out that:

It does not seem that the word "Connacht" can originally have meant 'the descendants of Conn'; it may have meant 'headship' or 'supremacy' from "cond" or "conn", head, and later have been interpreted as meaning "the descendants of Conn", Conn Cetchathach being derived from the word "Connacht" rather than vice versa. ... the name "Eoganacht" and "Ciannacht" were formed in imitation ...

Sproule's hypothesis has been accepted by historians such as Paul Byrne.

The dynasties of the Airgíalla, and through them the Uí Maine, while also counted as belonging to the Connachta by medieval genealogists, may not possibly be related, as some have assessed that they descend from other peoples later added to the genealogical scheme. Regardless, the connections to Uí Maine with each of the septs and their defined ancestor have been maintained for well over a millennium.

== The Connachta in the Ulster Cycle ==
In the sagas of the Ulster Cycle, the Connachta, ruled from Cruachan by their king Ailill mac Máta and their formidable queen Medb, are the enemies of the Ulaid, ruled from Emain Macha (Navan Fort, County Armagh) by Conchobar mac Nessa, and their wars, notably the Táin Bó Cúailnge (cattle raid of Cooley), are the setting for most of the stories. These sagas are traditionally set around the time of Christ, which creates an apparent anachronism: the Connachta are supposedly named after Conn Cétchathach, who in the usual chronological scheme established by the Lebor Gabála Érenn, lived in the 2nd century AD. Later texts used the supposedly earlier names of Cóiced Ol nEchmacht (the province of the Fir Ól nÉcmacht, an ancient people of Connacht) and Cóiced Genaind (the province of Genann, a legendary king of the Fir Bolg) for the western province to get around this difficulty. However, the saga tradition is older than the chronological scheme, which is an artificial attempt by Christian monks to synchronise native traditions with classical and biblical history, and it is possible that the Ulster Cycle is based on historical wars between the Ulaid and the Connachta which have been chronologically misplaced. Kenneth H. Jackson estimated that Ulster heroic saga originated in the 4th century.

== Connachta family tree ==
Genealogy of the Connachta

Tuathal Techtmar
Fedlimid Rechtmar | Cathair Mór
Conn Cétchathach | Eithne Táebfada
Medb Lethderg | Art mac Cuinn | Achtan
Cormac mac Airt
Cairbre Lifechair
Fíacha Sroiptine | Eochaid Doimlén
Muiredach Tirech
Mongfind | Eochaid Mugmedon | Cairenn
Brión | Fiachrae | Ailill | Fergus Caech | Niall | Airgíalla
Uí Briúin | Uí Fiachrach | Uí Ailello | Uí Néill | Uí Maine

== See also ==
- Kings of Connacht
- Síol Muireadaigh
- Cenél Conaill
- Cenél nEógain
- Irish nobility
- Irish royal families
