= Cóiced Ol nEchmacht =

Ancient region of Ireland (roughly Connacht)

Coordinates: 53.999°N 9.000°W

Cóiced Ol nEchmacht is an ancient name for the province of Connacht, Ireland and including the area of County Clare.

== Etymology and extent ==
Cóiced Ol nEchmacht may be translated as the portion/fifth/province of the Ol nEchmacht, also called the Fir Ol nEchmacht ("Fir" means "men"). The name nEchmacht has been linked by some scholars to the tribe called Nagnatae on Ptolemy's 2nd century AD world map.

They were divided into three main tribes: the Fir Craibe, or Fir na Criabe; the Tuatha Taiden; and the Gamanraige. Each tribe ruled respective kingdoms within Ol nEchmacht.

- The kingdom of the Fir Craibe extended from Limerick to the Palace of Fidach, a place thought to be located in north-eastern Aidhne. In later centuries the territory south of Aidhne, Thomond, would be annexed by Munster, which it is still counted as part of.
- The kingdom of Tuatha Taiden extended from Fidach eastwards to and across the Shannon towards Tara, and was probably co-extensive with Hy-Many at its greatest extent.
- The Gamanraige ruled the territory between the Gallimhe or Galway river, to the Drowes and Duff rivers in the north-east. Their capital was Rath Eochaidh, later called Cruachan.

This territory seems to have been Ol nEchmacht proper.

It was only with the rise of the Connachta dynasty that the term Fir Ol nEchmacht was dropped and the province was renamed Connacht.

== Nations of Ol nEchmacht ==
Nations known to have resided in Ol nEchmacht during this era included:

- Badhna - uncertain
- Bunrath - north of Athenry/south-west of Tuam
- Cairpre - around Drumcliffe in County Sligo
- Calraige - border of County Sligo/County Leitrim
- Cattraige - uncertain
- Ciarraige - central Mayo
- Clann Úmóir - Aran Islands, Galway and Mayo
- Conmaicne - west coast, and northern areas of, County Galway
- Corco Fhir Trí - south County Sligo
- Corco Moga - north-east County Galway
- Dál nDruithne - east of Loughrea
- Dartraige - north-west County Leitrim
- Delbhna - south County Roscommon, and both sides of the Corrib
- Erdini - County Leitrim/County Cavan
- Fir Craibe - County Clare (then part of Connacht) and south-west Galway
- Fir Domnann - west coast of Mayo
- Gabraige - along the River Suck
- Gamanrad - west shore of Killala Bay
- Gailenga - central County Mayo
- Luigne - east County Mayo & south County Sligo
- Mairtine Mór - branch of a Munster nation, possibly located in Connacht
- Medraige - nowadays the townlands of Maree, Oranmore
- Nagnatae - County Sligo
- Óic Bethra - area around Clarenbridge
- Partraige - in Connemara and Partry, County Mayo
- Senchineoil - centered on what is now Ballinasloe
- Soghain - most of east-central County Galway
- Tuatha Taiden - east Galway and south Roscommon
- Uaithne - County Roscommon/County Galway (likely Ptolemy's Auteini)
- Uí Mail - the area around Clew Bay

== Sources ==
- Foras Feasa Eirann, Geoffrey Keating, 1636.
- Leabhar Mor nGenealach, Dubhaltach MacFhirbhisigh, 1649–1666.
- Ogygia, Ruaidhri O Flaithbheartaigh, 1684.
- The History of Mayo, T.H.Knox, 1908.
