= Contents of the Book of Leinster =

The following table of contents for the Book of Leinster is based on the diplomatic edition by R.I. Best and M.A. O'Brien. The contents are listed according to the folio number of the manuscript and the page and volume number of the edition. The names of poets assigned in the Book of Leinster are here followed by (ascr.) (for 'ascribed') and need not represent genuine authorship.

== Diplomatic edition vol 1 ==
folio (MS)	page (ed.)	text
1	1	Lebor Gabála
14b 40	56	Do Flathiusaib hÉrend
24a 40	94	Do Flaithesaib hÉrend Iar Creitim (annals)
26b 30	100	Poem "Connachta cid dia tá in t-ainm"
27a	103	Cormac mac Cuilennáin (ascr.) "Iarfaiged nech acaib dam"
27b 50	108	Flann Mainistrech (ascr.), "A Gillu gairm n-ilgrada"
28a 45	112	Cormac an Fíle (ascr.), Turim Tigi Temrach "The Enumeration of the House of Tara" (dindsenchas poem)
29a	116	Tech Midchúarda (Diagram of guests and staff in a feasting hall)
29a	117	Poem Suidigud Tigi Midchuarda "The Arrangement of the Feasting Hall (in Tara)"
30a	120	Dindgnai Temrach "Tara's remarkable places" (Dindsenchas poem)
30d	124	Cethri srotha déc éicsi "The Fourteen 'Streams' of Poetry"
30d	125	Fland Fína (ascr.), "[...] nDe sruithe saera sonaide"
31a	128	Cináed úa hArtacáin (ascr.), Fíanna Bátar i nEmain
32a	135	Gilla na Náem úa Duinn (ascr.), "Cuiced Lagen na lecht ríg"
33b	144	Cúán úa Lothcháin (ascr.), "Temair Breg bale na fian"
35a	154	Fothart for trebaib Con Corbb (poem)
35a	156	Feidlimid athair Echach (poem)
35b	159	Augaine Már mac ríg Hérend (poem)
35b	160	Túathal Techtmar ba rí Temrach (poem)
37a	165	Trefocul (poetic treatise)
38a	173	Cellach húa Rúanada (ascr.), "Sluindfet duib dagaisti in dana"
38a	175	Dían
38b	177	De dúlib feda na fored
38b	179	Marb Cairpre Músc co n-áne
38b	180	Ríg hÉrend "The Kings of Ireland"
39b	181	Ríg Lagen "The Kings of Leinster"
40a	184	Ríg húa Cendselaig "The Kings of Uí Cheinnselaig"
40c	186	Ríg húa Falge "The Kings of the Isle of Man"
40e	189	Reges Ossairge "The Kings of Ossory"
41a	191	Ríg Connacht "The Kings of Connacht"
41c	192	Ríg Ulad "The Kings of Ulster"
41e	195	Ríg Dail Araide "The Kings of Dál nAraidi"
42a	196	Ríg Uisnig "The Kings of Uisnech"
42c	199	Comarbada Pátraic "The Successors of St. Patrick"
42d	202	Chóicid chóem Chairpri chrúaid
43b	206	Broccán Craibdech (ascr.), "Lecht Cormaic meic Culennain"
44b	213	Medb Lethderg (ascr.), "Macc Moga Corbb celas clú"
45a	215	Dubthach húa Lugair (ascr.), "Andsu immarbáig ri Lagnib"
45a	216	Dubthach húa Lugair (ascr.), "Crimthan clothrí cóicid Herend"
45b	219	Dubthach húa Lugair (ascr.), "Cath tucastar Crimthann"
46a	223	A bairgen ataí i ngábud ("O loaf, you are in danger"), "The Quarrel about the Loaf"
47a	226	Dallán mac Móre (ascr.), "Cerball Currig cáem Life"
47a	230	Dallán mac Móre (ascr.), "Mo chen a chlaidib Cherbaill"
47b	233	Brandub mac Echach
47b	233	Guidim Comdid cumachtach
48a	236	Bémmend Branduib for Brega "The Blows of Brandub in Brega", on Brandub son of Eochaid, king of the Leinstermen.
48b	237	Echta Lagen for Leth Cuind
49a	241	Clanna Falge Ruis in ríg
49b	243	Slan seiss a Brigit co mbuaid
50a	247	Haec sunt nomina uirorum componentium lapides
50a	248	Gormlaith ingen Flainn (ascr.), "Cia dír do chlerchib na cell"
50a	249	Túarastla Rosa Failgi
51a	250	Túathal Techtmar
51b	252	Orthanach (ascr.), "Masu de chlaind Echdach aird"
52a	257	Gormlaith ingen Flainn
52b	260	Dallan mac Móre (ascr.), ollam Cerbaill, "Cormac Femin Fogertach"

== Diplomatic edition vol 2 ==
folio (MS)	page (ed.)	text
53b-104b		Táin Bó Cúailnge
105b/106a	400	Scéla Chonchobuir ("the Tale of Conchobar")
107b	405	Aided Guill meic Carbada & Aided Gairb Glinne Rigi
111b	418	Scel Mucci Meic Da Thó ("The Tale of Mac Da Thó's Pig")
114a	426	Talland Etair ("The Siege of Howth")
117a	434	Athirne Áilgessach & Mider Brí Léith ("Athirne the Unsociable and Midir of Brí Léith")
117b	435	"Athirne and Amairgen son of Ecet Salach"
118a	436	Aigidecht Aithirne ("The Guesting of Athirne")
118b	440	Aided Cheltchair meic Uthechair ("The death of Celtchar mac Uthechair")
118b	442	Brislech Mór Maige Muirthemni
119b	444	Beochobra Con Culaind isind ló fúair bás
122b	454	Siaburchobra Con Culaind i llathiu a éitsechta
122b	454	Cu Chulaind atbert. De aduentu Christi.
123a	455	Nuallguba Emire
123b	458	Aided Choncobuir
124b	461	Aided Meidbe
125a	463	Aided Derb Forgaill
125b	467	Noenden Ulad & Emuin Macha
126a	469	Tréide Cétna Labratar Iarna Genemain

== Diplomatic edition vol 3 ==
folio (MS)	page (ed.)	text
127a	471	Gilla Cómáin mac Gilla Samthainde (ascr.), "hÉriu ard inis na rríg"
129b	491	Gilla Cómáin mac Gilla Samthainde (ascr.), "Attá sund forba fessa"
130b	496	Gilla Cómáin mac Gilla Samthainde (ascr.), "Analad anall uile"
131b	504	Fland Mainistrech (ascr.), "Rig Themra dia tesband tnú"
132b	509	Fland Mainistrech (ascr.), "Rig Themra toebaige iar tain"
133b	516	Mael Muru Othna (ascr.), "Can a mbunadas na nGaedel"
135a	524	Mac Cosse fer legind Ruis Ailithir (ascr.), "Rofessa i curp domuin dúir"
136b	533	Gilla Mo Dutu Úa Caiside, "Adam oenathair na ndoene"
141b	563	Dublitir hua Uathgaile, "Redig dam a Dé do nim"
143a	574	Gilla in Chomded húa Cormaic, "Arí richid reidig dam"
145a	588	Ailbe: Úar in lathe do Lum Luine
145b	590	Fland Mainistrech (ascr.), "Mugain ingen Chonchraid chain"
145b	592	Clanna Ailella Uluim uill
146a	594	Senchán Torpéist (ascr.), "A Pair ri sil nEogain Móir"
146a	597	Trí Fothaid Elgga cen chron
146b	598	Ailill Aulom (ascr.), "Beir mo scíath sceo fri úath"
146b	602	Ailill Aulom (ascr.), "A Maccáin ná cí"
147a	608	Dub Dá Thúath (asc.), "Diambad messe bad rí reil"
148a	613	Fothad na Canone, "Cert cech rig co rréil"
149a	621	Fothad na Canone, "Cu Aed Ordnithe"
149a	622	Moling (ascribed), "Rochuala la nech legas libru"
149a	623	Fithal Fíle & Cormac an Fíle (ascr.), "Niba me linfes do neoch dara thráth"
149a	625	"A Chormaic coisc do maicni"
149a	627	Teist Chathail meic Finguine (poem)
149b	629	Diarmait mac Cerbaill (ascr.), "Mairg thochras ri clerchib cell"
150a	632	Fland Fína, "In rigan ecnaid óg fial"
150a	633	Cináed ua hArtacáin (ascr.), "A chloch thall for elaid úair"
150a	635	Fland Fína (ascr.), "Inn eól dúib in senchas sen"
150b	637	Flann mac Lonáin (ascr.), "Maiccni Echach ard a ngle"
151-8		Metrical Dindsenchas
154a	663	Oisín (ascr.), "Ogum i llia lia uas lecht"
159-60		Prose Dindsenchas

== Diplomatic edition vol 4 ==
folio (MS)	page (ed.)	text
161-4		Metrical Dindsenchas
165-70		Prose Dindsenchas
171a	761	Cath Ruis na Ríg
179a	780	Sanas Cormaic
181a	782	Fland Manistrech (ascr.), "Cia triallaid nech aisnis senchais"
181b	785	Fland Manistrech (ascr.), "Cind cethri ndíni iar Frigrind"
182a	788	Ascnam ni seol sadal
182b	791	Aní doronsat do chalmu
183b	797	A Ngluind a n-echta a n-orgni
184b	803	Mide magen clainne Cuind
185a	810	Síl Aeda Sláne na sleg
186a	815	Immacallam in dá Thúarad
189a	833	Cathcharpat serda
189b	835	Do nemthigud filed
190b	838	Na Trí Fothaid
190b	840	Inis Dornglais ro gab Crimthann
190c	840	Temaile fáid Miled Espáin
190c	841	Mugdorn ingen Moga Duib
191-216		Metrical Dindsenchas
217a-244b		Togail Troí "The Destruction of Troy"

== Diplomatic edition vol 5 ==
folio (MS)	page (ed.)	text
245b	1119	Do fallsigud Tána Bó Cualnge
245b	1120	De Gabail in tSida
246a	1121	De Chophur in da Muccida
247a	1125	Tain Bó Flidaisi
248a	1127	Tain Bó Fraich
252b	1136	Fochond Loingse Fergusa meic Roig
252b/253a	1137	Tochmarc Ferbae
259b	1162	Longes mac nUsnig
261b	1171	Mesca Ulad
269a	1188-92	Orgain Dind Ríg
270a 45-271a 46		Esnada Tige Buchet
271-273		Fingal Rónáin "The Kin-slaying of Ronan"
273b	1202	Niall Frossach
274a	1204	Óenach Talten
274a	1205	Aided Cuanach meic Ailchini
275b	1210	Echtra Laegaire meic Crimthainn
276b	1214	Cath Carn Chonaill
277b	1218	Senchas Ailiúin Chobthaig
278a	1221	A ben bennacht fort na raid
278a	1222	Días macclerech
278b	1223	Ri irissech ro boí do Grecaib
279a	1224	Iartaige na hingine colaige do Grécaib
280a	1227	Dá brón flatha nime
281a	1229	Cethrur macclerech
281b	1230	Epscop do Gaedelaib dochoid do Róim
282a	1231	Baí rí amra de Grécaib Salemón a ainm
282b	1232	Sloiged már rucsat Gréic co Hebríb fechtas n-aile
283a	1233	Triar macclerech
283b	1235	Macclerech do muntir Ferna móire
283b	1236	Fechtas do M'ling is Tóidin co n-acca Mael Doborchon
284a	1236	Drochcomaithech ro baí i n-ocus dosom .i. Grác
284a	1237	Mo Lling Luachra dalta do Maehóc Ferna
284a	1238	Fechtas dósom oc ernaigthi ina eclais
284b	1240	Caillech dorat a mac dósum do M'Ling
285a	1241	Fechtas aile do M'Ling is Toídin
285b	1243	Cóica epscop dodeochatar dochum M'Oedoc Ferna do Bretnaib Cille Muine
285b	1244	Buí siur Mo Lassi Lethglinni oc légund i fail Mo Lasse
286a	1246	Luid Mael Ruain Tamlachta fechtas dia airge
286b	1248	Cummíne Fota mac Fiachnai di Eoganacht Chassil
286b	1249	Longes Chonaill Chuirc
288a	1252	Cath Maige Mucrama
292a	1262	De maccaib Conaire"On Conaire's sons"
293a	1265	Audacht Morainn "The Testament of Morand"
294b	1268	Bórama
308b	1319	Cogad Gaedel re Gallaib

== Sources ==
- Book of Leinster, ed. R.I. Best; Osborn Bergin; M.A. O'Brien; Anne O'Sullivan (1954–83). The Book of Leinster, formerly Lebar na Núachongbála. 6 vols. Dublin: DIAS. Available from CELT: vols. 1 (pp. 1–260), 2 (pp. 400–70), 3 (pp. 471–638, 663), 4 (pp. 761–81 and 785–841), 5 (pp. 1119–92 and 1202–1325)
