= Gamanraige =

The Gamanraige were the main branch of the Fir Ol nEchmacht, a people who ruled much of Ireland west of the Shannon in the pre-historic era.

The Gamanraige ruled the territory between the Gallimhe or Galway river, to the Drowes and Duff rivers in the north-east. Their capital was Rath Eochaidh, later called Cruchain. This territory seems to have been Ol nEchmacht proper. It was only with the rise of The Connachta dynasty that the term Fir Ol nEchmacht was dropped and the province was renamed Connacht.

The story of the Táin Bó Flidhais tells the tale of a raid by the Connachta tribe on the Gamanraige. Queen Medb, her husband Ailill and their guest from the Ulaidh, Fergus launched a raid on Flidhais and her husband Oilill Finn in Erris, North Mayo.

== Sources ==
- "Foras Feasa Eirann", Geoffrey Keating, 1636.
- "Leabhar Mor nGenealach", Dubhaltach MacFhirbhisigh, 1649–1666.
- "Ogyia", Ruaidhri O Flaithbheartaigh, 1684.
- "The History of Mayo", T.H.Knox, 1908.
