= Moylena =

Moylena may refer to:

- Mag Lena, anglicised Moylena or Moylen, a heath near Dunmore Abbey in Ireland, the site of medieval battles and a synod
- Moylena Ground, home of Muckamore Cricket Club, Antrim, Northern Ireland

== Similar spellings ==
- Molena, Georgia, city in Pike County, Georgia, United States
- Mollena Williams-Haas, American actress and BDSM educator
