= Flaithbertach mac Inmainén =

Flaithbertach mac Inmainén (died 944) was abbot of Inis Cathaig (Scattery Island) and sometime King of Munster in the south of Ireland. Unrelated to the dominant Eóganachta, Flaithbertach belonged to the Múscraige, an Érainn people.

== Cath Belach Mugna ==
Flaithbertach is first mentioned by the Irish annals in 907, when he is recorded, along with the then-King of Munster Cormac mac Cuilennáin, leading an expedition by the Munstermen against Connacht and the Uí Néill. According to the partisan pro-Munster Annals of Innisfallen, Cormac and Flaithbertach defeated Flann Sinna, the High King of Ireland, and later obtained hostages from the Uí Néill. The northern Annals of Ulster make no mention of this although the late Annals of the Four Masters agree with the Annals of Innisfallen.

In 908, Cormac and Flaithbertach collected an army to campaign against their eastern neighbours, Leinster, whose king Cerball mac Muirecáin was Flann Sinna's son-in-law and staunch ally. The Fragmentary Annals of Ireland, a source compiled in the 11th century for Donnchad mac Gilla Pátraic, king of Osraige and king of Leinster, contain a long account of this campaign, perhaps written within living memory.

After the army of Munster had gathered, while riding through the camp Flaithbertach's horse stumbled and threw him to the ground. This, it is said, was taken to be a very bad omen. Many of the Munstermen were unwilling to fight, and news of this came to Cerball mac Muirecáin, who proposed a negotiated settlement. The Leinstermen would pay tribute, and give hostages, but the hostages would be given to Móenachm, abbot of Diseart Díarmata (Castledermot, modern County Kildare), rather than to the Munstermen. Cormac, it is said, was willing to accept this settlement, but Flaithbertach—Byrne refers to him as "Cormac's evil genius"— was not and persuaded Cormac to fight, in spite of the king's conviction that he would be killed.

This, and the news than Flann and the Uí Néill had come to Cerball's aid, led to desertions from Cormac's army, but he marched on Leinster all the same, meeting Cerball and Flann at the Battle of Bellaghmoon (Bellaghmoon, in the south of modern County Kildare). The Fragmentary Annals say that "the men of Munster came to the battle weak and in disorder" and they quickly broke and fled the field. Many were killed, Cormac among them, his neck broken when falling from his horse. Flaithbertach was captured.

== Kildare and Cashel ==
Flaithbertach was taken to Kildare, where he was held captive, not being released until after Cerball mac Muirecáin's death in 909. The Fragmentary Annals say that the clerics of Leinster, apparently led by the abbess of Kildare, Muirenn ingen Suairt, subjected Flaithbertach to harsh criticism for his part in the death of the saintly Cormac: "The evil things that certain scholars of Leinster said about Flaithbertach are shameful to tell, and improper to write."

The kingship of Munster was seemingly vacant from Cormac's death until 914, when the Annals of Innisfallen and the Fragmentary Annals report that Flaithbertach was installed at Cashel as king of Munster. It is suggested that clerical kings—Flaithbertach and Cormac were not the only such, an earlier abbot of Inis Cathaig, Ólchobar mac Flainn had also been king of Munster, as had an abbot of Emly, Ólchobar mac Cináeda—were usually compromise candidates, chosen when the inner circle of Eóganachta could find no acceptable candidate from their own ranks. Such clerical kings often belonged to outsider or even unimportant families. Byrne states that Flaithbertach had no link to the ruling families of the Eóganachta, being described as a member of the Múscraige.

Little can be said with certainty about Flaithbertach's reign, a period which saw increasing Viking activity in the south-west of Ireland. While he died in 944, it is very unlikely that he was king at his death. It is presumed that he abdicated in 922, being followed as king by Lorcán mac Coinlígáin of the Cashel branch of the Eóganachta. The Annals of the Four Masters state that he went upon pilgrimage. In 923 Flaithbertach was captured near Roscrea by Vikings from Limerick, although evidently later released.

Flaithbertach mac Inmainén Múscraige
Regnal titles
Preceded by Cormac mac Cuilennáin	King of Munster c. 914 – 922	Succeeded by Lorcán mac Coinlígáin
