= Mag Lena =

Plain found in Irish legends

Coordinates: 53.29°N 7.52°W

Mag Lena, Mag Léna, or Mag Léne (anglicised Moylena or Moylen) was the name of a plain or heath in the Gaelic Irish territory of Firceall, between modern Tullamore and Durrow in County Offaly. Mag Lena straddled the Esker Riada, was near the border between Mide and Laigin (Leinster), and is mentioned in Irish manuscripts as the site of several legendary, pseudohistorical, and historical events. The civil parish of Kilbride in Ballycowan was "Kilbride al[ias] Moylena" in the time of Charles I. According to John O'Donovan, the name Moleany was still being used in 1837 for the corresponding Catholic parish (formally Kilbride or Tullamore, and united to Durrow, in the Diocese of Meath). By then the area was agricultural rather than heathland.

== Legendary events ==
The dindsenchas of Mag Lena appended to The Tale of Mac Da Thó's Pig says the name means "the plain of Léna", from Mac Da Thó's son Léna, who was buried there. The division of Ireland into Leath Cuinn and Leath Moga (Conn's Half and Mug's Half) stems from a battle at Mag Lena, in which Conn Cétchathach defeated Éogan Mór Mug Nuadat, The battle is placed at varying dates in the second century AD by the Book of Ballymote, Book of Lecan, Annals of Ulster, and Book of Leinster. The 13th-century text The Battle of Magh Lena was published in 1855 with an English translation and notes by Eugene O'Curry. (James Macpherson's Ossian conflates this Moylena with a different place in Ulster, perhaps Moylinny in County Antrim, which gives its name to the Moylena Cricket Ground.)

== Historical events ==
About AD 630, a synod of Irish clerics was held in Mag Lena to resolve the controversy over the date of Easter. Shortly afterwards the southern clergy accepted the Roman computus, while at Mag nAilbe (Moynalvy, County Meath) the northern clergy persisted with the Iona value. The Óenach Colmáin, an important 9th-century aonach dedicated to Colmán Elo, was probably held at Lynally at the southern edge of Mag Lena. In AD 906, another battle at Mag Lena was the first of two between the forces on the one hand of Cormac mac Cuilennáin, the king of Munster, and on the other hand of Flann Sinna, the king of Mide and High King of Ireland, and Cerball mac Muirecáin, the king of Leinster. Cormac won at Mag Lena but was killed two years later at Belach Mugna. About AD 1020, Maolmuadh Ó Maolmhuaidh, king of Firceall, was taken by force from Durrow Abbey by Fogartach Uí Chernaig, and killed in Mag Lena. In AD 1090, Muirchertach Ua Briain of Munster lost a bloody battle against Domnall Ua Maél Sechnaill of Mide as part of a four-sided contest for the High Kingship.

== Sources ==
- FitzPatrick, Elizabeth (2015). "Assembly Places and Elite Collective Identities in Medieval Ireland". Journal of the North Atlantic. 8: 52–68. doi:10.3721/037.002.sp805. hdl:10379/5224. JSTOR 26687008. S2CID 145379529.
- O'Donovan, John (2008). Herrity, Michael (ed.). Offaly. Ordnance Survey Letters. Dublin: Four Masters Press. ISBN 9781903538111 – via Internet Archive.
