= Cathal mac Conchobair =

Cathal mac Conchobair (died 925) was King of Connacht.

== Family background ==
Cathal was the third son of Conchobar mac Taidg Mór (died 882) to rule Connacht, following his older brother Áed mac Conchobair (died 888) and youngest brother Tadg mac Conchobair (died 900). There may have been a fourth brother, Máel Cluiche mac Conchobair, who died in battle in 913.

They belonged to the Síl Muiredaig branch of Uí Briúin Ai kindred. The Uí Briúin Ai claimed descent from Brion, an older brother of Niall of the Nine Hostages, and the kingship of Connacht alternated irregularly between the Síl Muiredaig and the Síl Cathail branches of the kindred. By Cathal's time, the Síl Cathail were all but excluded from the succession.

== King of Connacht ==
On becoming king, Cathal was faced with a demand from Flann Sinna (died 916), the High King of Ireland, for acknowledgement of his authority. This was agreed in a meeting at Clonmacnoise in 900, and Cathal is found frequently fighting alongside and on behalf of Flann.

== The Munster Wars ==
War broke out between the high king and the King of Munster, Cormac mac Cuilennáin (died 908) and Cathal became caught up in this as an ally of Flann Sinna. In 907, the forces of Munster campaigned against the Connachta as far as Mag nAí (in central modern County Roscommon) and the Ui Neill and took the hostages of Connacht. These forces included a naval force operating on the Shannon. In 908, however, the forces of the high king which included Cathal defeated and crushed the forces of Munster at the Battle of Bellaghmoon in Mag Ailbe (Ballaghmoon, in northern modern County Carlow) and Cormac was slain.

== Connacht invaded ==
In 913, Niall Glúndub (died 919) of the Cenél nEógain of the northern Ui Neill began to make his bid to be recognized as heir to the high Kingship. He invaded Connacht and defeated the men of North Connacht (Uí Amalgada and the men of Umall). Cathal's brother was slain in this affair. Niall became high king in 916.

== Defeat of Donnchad Donn ==
The next high king Donnchad Donn (died 944) of Meath invaded Connacht in 922. His forces were however defeated in the wilderness of Áth Luain (Athlone). Whether this was the usual attempt of a new high king to impose his authority on Connacht or directed against the intense Viking activity on the Shannon at this time is not mentioned. The King of Aidne, Mael son of Duí had been killed by Vikings that year

== Death of the Tainist of Connacht ==
The death of Cathal's heir is mentioned in the annals in 923. According to The Annals of Ulster this was Máel Cluiche who was treacherously killed, however his death is mentioned in 913 in this annal. The Annals of the Four Masters give his heir the name Indrechtach and state he was another son of Conchobar. This same Indrechtach was found operating a fleet with the men of Meath on Loch Derg clearing out the Munster fleet from the Shannon.

== Death and succession ==
Cathal died in 925 in penitence. Cathal was succeed on his death by his son Tadg in Túir (died 956), who was succeeded in his turn by Fergal ua Ruairc (died 967) of the rising Uí Briúin Bréifne branch of the Uí Briúin.

== Notes ==
| Preceded by Tadg mac Conchobair | Kings of Connacht; 900–925 | Succeeded by Tadg mac Cathail |
