= Esker Riada =

Geologic feature in Ireland

The Esker Riada (Irish: Eiscir Riada) is a system of eskers that stretch across the middle of Ireland, between Dublin and Galway.

== Geography ==
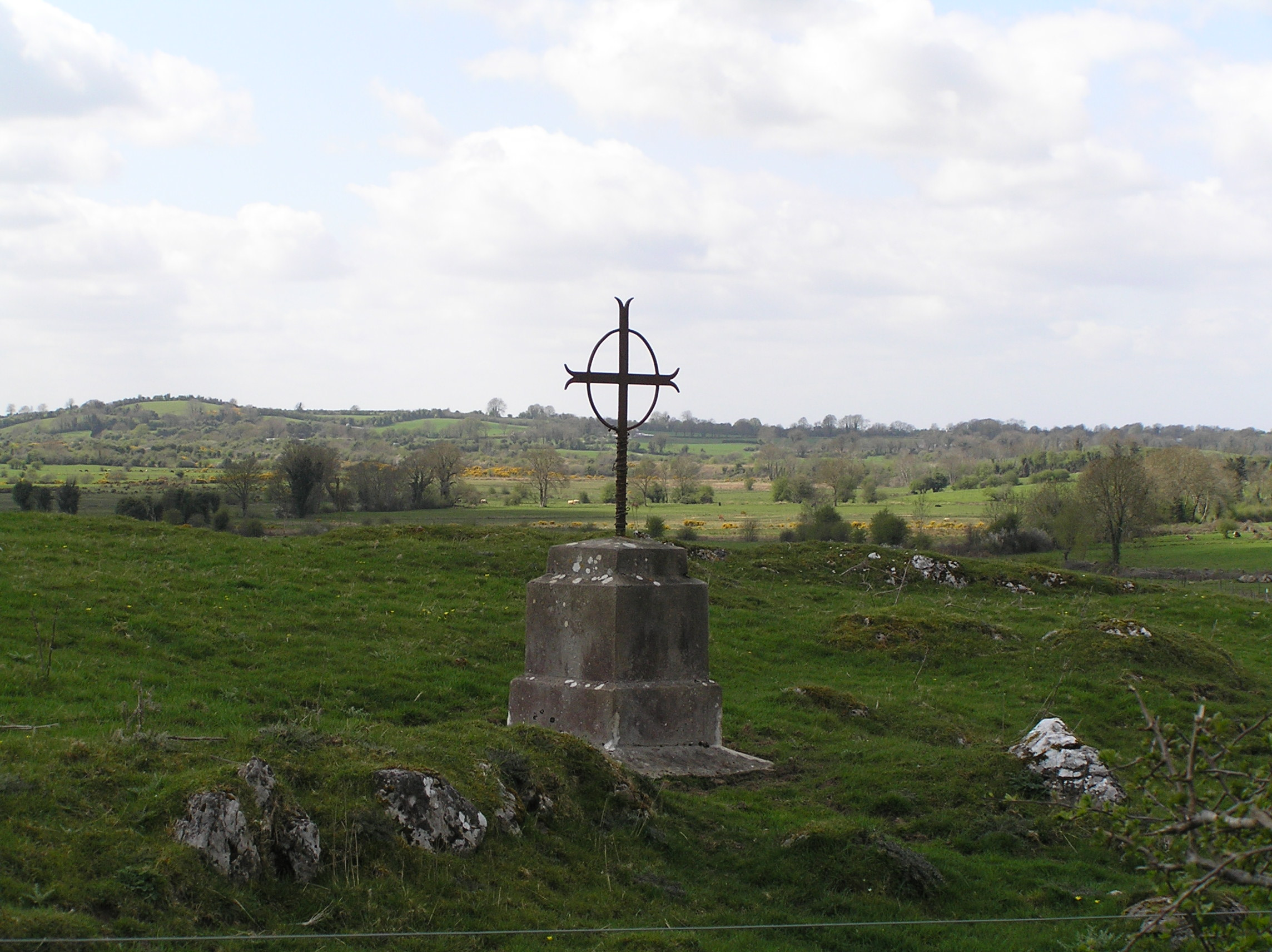
Landscape typical of the Esker Riada, County Westmeath

The Esker Riada is a collection of eskers that passes through the counties of Dublin, Meath, Kildare, Westmeath, Offaly, Leitrim, Longford, Roscommon and Galway. A large remnant of the Esker exists in the Teernacreeve region of Westmeath, and stretches from Kilbeggan to Tyrrellspass.

The eskers take the form of relatively low-lying ridges composed of sand, gravel and boulders deposited by water flowing beneath a glacier that became exposed when the glacier melted at the end of the last ice age, around 10,000 years ago.

== Historical significance ==
The Irish name Eiscir Riada provides an indication of the significance of the eskers. The first element (and English esker) comes from Old Irish escir meaning "a ridge, an elevation (separating two plains or depressed surfaces)" and the second is from Old Irish ríad which refers to "riding, driving" (later "taming") of the horses or oxen driven on it.

Following a battle at Mag Lena, in the second century, the island of Ireland was divided into two political entities along the line of the eskers – ‘Leath Cuinn’ (‘Conn’s Half’) to the north, and ‘Leath Mogha’ (‘Mogha’s Half’) to the south.

Because of its slightly higher ground, the Esker Riada provided a route through the bogs of the Irish midlands. It has, since ancient times, formed a highway joining the east and west of Ireland. Indeed, its ancient Irish name is ‘An tSlí Mhór’, meaning ‘The Great Way’.

The Slighe Mhór ('Great Highway') provided a link between Clonard Abbey, Durrow Abbey and the monastic settlement of Clonmacnoise, constructed at the point where the River Shannon passes through the Esker Riada.

In contrast with the surrounding boglands, the glacial sands typical of the eskers provided well drained and relatively good quality land, proving useful for agriculture.

== Present day ==
To this day, the Esker Riada continues to serve as a highway, the main N6 Dublin to Galway road still closely following it; and much agricultural activity still takes place along its length. The Dublin part begins at High Street, beside Wood Quay, site of the Viking settlement and original ford made of hurdles, or basketwork, that gives Dublin its name (Átha Cliath), and follows southwest through Kilmainham to Greenhills Road.

The eskers have become a valued source of building material, with sand and gravel extraction being commonplace. However, the negative environmental impact of such operations is now being realized and this, along with a developing awareness of the ridge and its significance in Ireland’s history, has led to increasing restrictions. Indeed, Offaly County Council has moved to give the ridge protection in its County Development Plan, and has gone so far as to press to have the Esker Riada recognized as a World Heritage Site.

== See also ==
- Geology of Ireland
- Geography of Ireland
