= Coin of Connaught =

A coin was issued for circulation in Connaught during the reign of King Edward VI of England (1547–1553). It is a contemporary forgery of the extremely rare English shilling of that reign. It was struck in brass, and, occasionally, in copper. This interesting coin was known by the nickname 'Bungal', whose origin is not yet known. It circulated as a 1 penny coin.

== Obverse inscription ==
EDWARD VI D.G. AGL FRAN Z HB REX – Edward VI by the grace of God, of England, France and Ireland King.

== Reverse inscription ==
TIMOR DOMINI FONS VITE MDLII – The fear of God is the fountain of life 1552. This was the family motto of Edmund Butler, 1st/11th Baron Dunboyne (1515–1567) and subsequent Barons Dunboyne.

== Obverse details ==
The crowned portrait of the boy King facing right. The harp mintmark is located at the start of the inscription.

== Reverse details ==
The English coat of arms in an oval shield dividing the letters 'E.R.'

== Catalogue reference numbers ==
- IE6SH-010.
- S6494a

== See also ==
- Coins of Ireland
