= Delbhna =

Gaelic Irish Tribe

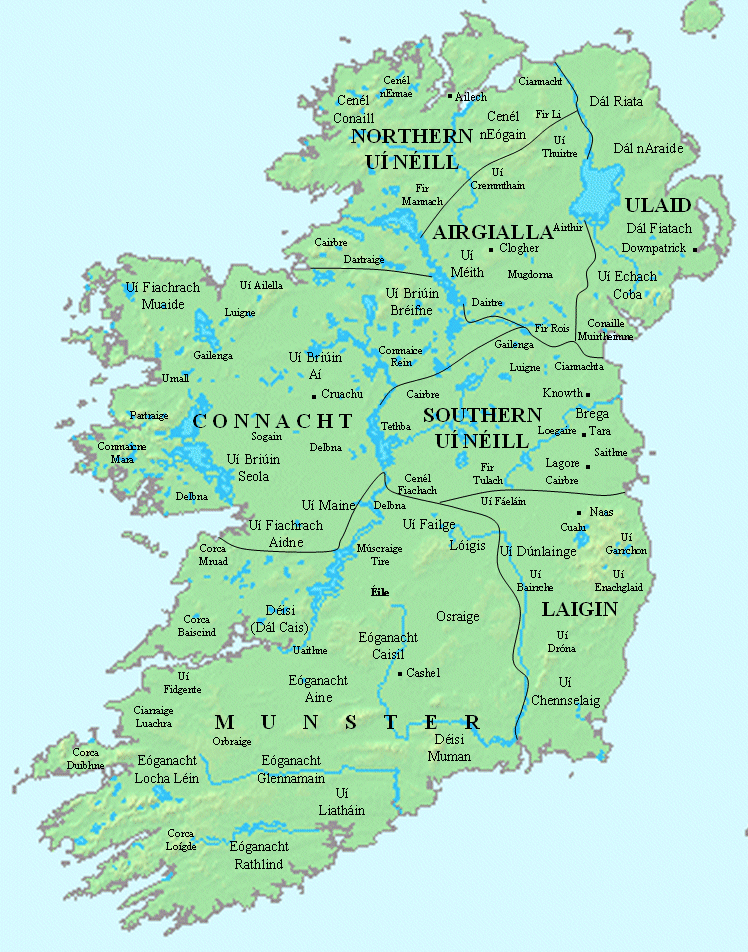
Map of Ireland with tribes, AD 800; the Delbhna are circled.

The Delbna or Delbhna were a Gaelic Irish tribe in Ireland, claiming kinship with the Dál gCais, through descent from Dealbhna son of Cas. Originally one large population, they had a number of branches in Connacht, Meath, and Munster in Ireland.

== Branches ==
- The Delbhna Tir Dha Locha (of the Two Lakes), or Delbhna Feadha (of the Heather), were based in the area of County Galway between Lough Corrib and Lough Lurgan/Galway Bay. Their chiefs took the surname MacConraoi, or MacConroy, later Anglicized to King. The MacConraoi held Gno Mor while their cadets, O'hEanna or O'Heney, held Gno Beg, but in the annals MacConraoi is always styled Ri or Tighearna Thira Da Locha.
- The Delbhna Cuile Fabhair ('Delbhna of the hill of the well') once held Maigh Seóla, the area east of Lough Corrib in County Galway, until conquered by the Uí Briúin Seóla (who later became the Muintir Murchada, then the Ó Flaithbertaighs, who were in turn later driven into Connemara, where they became known as Kings of Iar Connacht). Their chiefs took the surname O'Fathairtaigh or Faherty.
- The Delbhna Nuadat, or Delbhna Uí Maine, were lords of a large section that is now Athlone in County Roscommon, situated between the Suck and Shannon Rivers. From the early historic era they were a subject people of the Uí Maine. This place is where the Uí Maine expelled the old kings of the province. Their chiefs took the surname O'Flannagain or Flannagan.
- The Delbhna bEthra ('bear-Delbhna') may have once formed a single kingdom with the Delbhna Nuadat until subjugated by the Uí Maine. By the late 5th century they had fallen under the control of the Uí Néill. Their chiefs took the surname Mac Cochláin or Coughlan, and their territory was what is now Garrycastle in County Offaly, but did not include the Parish of Lusmagh, as that belonged to the MacCuolahans/Ó hUallacháins of Síol Anmchadha.
- The Delbhna Mor ('great Delbhna') were located in what is now Delvin in County Westmeath. Their chiefs took the surname O'Finnallain or Fenelon. They lived together with one of the seven branches of the Soghain.
- The Delbhna Bheag, or Delbhna Bec ('little Delbhna'), were based in what is now Fore barony in County Meath. Their chiefs took the surname Ua Maoilchallan, or Mulholland.
- The Delbhna Sith Neannta ('Delbhna of the nettle-fairies') ruled over the area now called Fairymount in County Roscommon. Their chiefs took the name O'Laoghog or Logue.
- The Delbhna Teannmhagh ('Delbhna of Teannmhagh', a plain in Connacht), or Delbhna Iarthair Mhidhe ('Delbhna of Western Mide'), at one time controlled what is now Rathconrath in County Westmeath. Their chiefs took the surname Ua Scolaidhe or O'Scully.

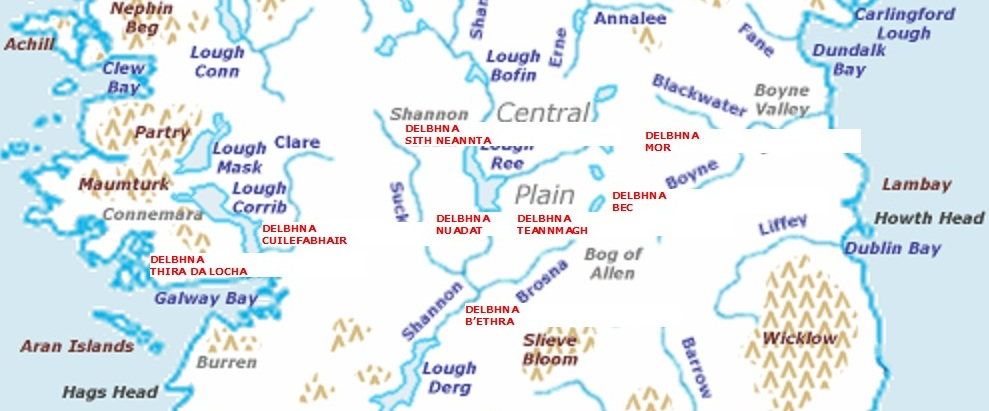
Central Ireland showing the approximate location of the various branches of the Delbhna

According to their earliest legends, the Delbhna took their name from their ancestor Delbáeth, son of either Aengus or Ogma, a god of the Tuatha Dé Danann who succeeded The Dagda, or Eochaid Ollathair, as High King of Ireland and who for various reasons is identified as the same as Tuireann. A later story told that the Delbhna descend from Suman, son of Lugh Delbáeth, son of Cas, progenitor of the Dal gCais. A possible derivation from the name is from the Old Irish delb, "form, likeness" and nae, "people", therefore the delbnae are "the beautiful people."

== See also ==
- Uí Fiachrach Aidhne
- Clann Fhergail
- Clann Taidg
- Senchineoil
- Trícha Máenmaige
- Uí Díarmata
- Cóiced Ol nEchmacht
- Síol Anmchadha
- Cenél Áeda na hEchtge
- Conmhaicne
