= Delbhna Nuadat =

The Delbhna Nuadat (Modern Irish: Dealbhna Nuad; IPA: [ˈdʲalˠəwnˠə ˈn̪ˠuəd̪ˠ]) were lords of a large section of what is now Athlone in County Roscommon, situated between the Suca and Shannon rivers. A branch of the larger Delbhna population group, they were from the early historic era a subject people of the Ui Maine.

There are a handful of references to the Delbhna Nuadat in the annals. In 751, they were defeated at the battle of Bealach Cro by Crimthann, king of Ui Maine. Finn mac Arbh, Lord of Delbhna, was killed "and the Dealbhna were slaughtered about him." This battle appears to have been the culmination of a war between the Ui Maine and the Delbhna Nuadat for possession of Athlone.

In 759, Diumasach, Lord of Delbhna Nuadat, drowned in an incident called "The shipwreck of the Dealbhna Nuadhat on Loch Ribh."

An entry for 1048 states that "A predatory excursion was made by the royal heirs or chieftains of Ui-Maine into Dealbhna, where the royal chieftains were all slain, namely, Ua Maelruanaidh, Ua Flannagain, the Cleireach Ua Taidhg, and Mac Buadhachain, royal heir of Dealbhna Nuadhat."

The chiefs of Delbhna Nuadat eventually took the surname O'Flannagain or O’Flanagan.
