= Conchobar mac Taidg Mór =

King of Connacht, founder of the Ó Conchobhair dynasty

Conchobar mac Taidg Mór (died 882) was a King of Connacht from the Uí Briúin branch of the Connachta. He was the grandson of Muirgius mac Tommaltaig (died 815), a previous king. His father Tadg Mór (died 810) had been slain fighting in Muirgius' wars versus the minor tribes of Connacht. He was of the Síl Muiredaig sept of the Uí Briúin. The Ó Conchobhair septs of Connacht are named for him.

== Biography ==
The exact dates of his reign are uncertain. According to the Book of Leinster king-list he is given a reign of 27 years which would synchronise to a reign of circa 855 to 882 The death of a co-ruler Mugron mac Máele Cothaid is mentioned in 872.

Connacht was subject to the High King of Ireland during this period. In 860 the men of Connacht participated in the expedition of the high king Máel Sechnaill mac Máele Ruanaid (died 862) of Clann Cholmáin against the northern Ui Neill. They halted at Mag Dumai, near Armagh, where their camp was attacked but they beat this attack off and the expedition ended without a clear victor. In 863 the new high king Áed Findliath (died 879) of the Cenél nEógain made an expedition into Connacht to impose his authority.

Conchobar fought as an ally of the high king Áed Findliath against Flann mac Conaing (died 868), King of Brega, and his Viking allies at the Battle of Cell Ua nDaigri in 868. Despite being outnumbered, they won the victory. Conchobar's vassal king, Mannachan, lord of Ui Briuin Na Sinna slew Flann; of which was said:

"Great the triumph for Mannachan, for the hero of fierce valour, to have the head of the son of Conaing in his hand, to exhibit it before the face of the son of Tadhg."

The Fragmentary Annals of Ireland record a Norse raid through Connacht on their way to Limerick in 867 but they were ambushed and defeated by the Connachtmen. In 873 Connacht was attacked by Dúnchad mac Duib-dá-Bairenn (died 888), King of Munster and Cerball mac Dúnlainge (died 888), king of Osraige.

The heir to Connacht, Abán son of Cinaed was killed with fire by Sochlachán son of Diarmait in 867 and in 872 his apparent co-ruler Mugron mac Máele Cothaid died. Conchobar himself died at an old age in 882, according to the annals.

Conchobar had married Ailbe, daughter of the high king Máel Sechnaill mac Máele Ruanaid. Conchobar's sons Áed mac Conchobair (died 888), Tadg mac Conchobair (died 900) and Cathal mac Conchobair (died 925) were all Kings of Connacht. Cathal's descendants were known as the Ua Conchobair (modern O'Connor), the descendants of Conchobar. Another son was named Máel Cluiche (died 913).
