= Lugh Delbáeth =

Lugh Delbáeth is a legendary figure mentioned by James Hardiman as a prehistoric settler in what is now County Galway. Hardiman states:

"About this period, some of the descendants of Luig Dealbhaodh, son of Cos, king of North Munster, settled in the territory of Delvin Feadha, in Tirdaloch, to the west of Galway."

This refers to settlement by the Delbhna, an ethnic group in Gaelic Ireland. They had a number of branches in central and western Ireland, including the Delbhna Tir Dha Locha were the most westerly branch, based in Iar Connacht. They may have originally spanned east and west banks of the two lakes. They fell into obscurity in the early Irish historic era. The royal dynasty of the Delbhna Tir Dha Locha adopted the surname MacConraoi, sometimes anglicised as Conroy, still found in Connemara and other parts of County Galway, but more often as King.
