= Tuatha Taiden =

Ancient tribe in Ireland

The Tuatha Taiden were a branch of the Fir Ol nEchmacht, one of the ancient peoples of Ireland.

The kingdom of Tuatha Taiden extended from Fidach eastwards to and across the Shannon towards Tara, and was probably co-extensive with Uí Maine at its greatest extent.

== Sources ==
- "Foras Feasa Éireann", Geoffrey Keating, 1636.
- "Leabhar Mor nGenealach", Dubhaltach MacFhirbhisigh, 1649–1666.
- "Ogyia", Ruaidhri O Flaithbheartaigh, 1684.
- "The History of Mayo", T.H.Knox, 1908.
