= Áed mac Conchobair =

King of Connacht
- Reign: 882 – 888
- Predecessor: Conchobar mac Taidg Mór
- Successor: Tadg mac Conchobair
- Died: 888

Áed mac Conchobair (died 888) was a King of Connacht from the Uí Briúin branch of the Connachta. He was the son of Conchobar mac Taidg Mór (died 882), the previous king and was the first of his three sons to rule in succession. He was of the Síl Muiredaig sept of the Uí Briúin. He ruled from 882-888.

Áed's reign was involved in conflict with the Vikings. In 887 the Connachta inflicted a slaughter on the Vikings of Limerick. In 888 Áed met his death at the Battle of the Settlers where the high king Flann Sinna (died 916) was defeated by the Vikings of Dublin.
