= Nagnatae =

Early Irish population group

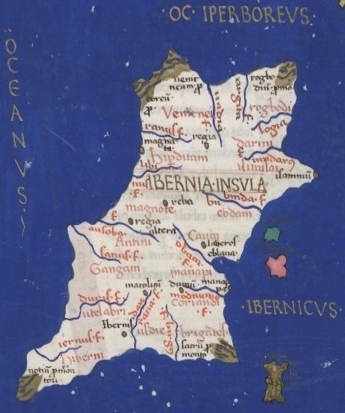
1467 reproduction of Ptolemy's Ireland: the red text Magnote is located in the west.

The Nagnatae (Ναγνάται) or Magnatae (Μαγνάται) were a people of ancient Ireland, recorded in Ptolemy's 2nd century Geography as living in northern Connacht. O'Rahilly suggests a connection between the Nagnatae and the Fir Ól nÉcmacht, a people of early Connacht, assuming a degree of corruption in the transmission of both names. For the town in their territory see Nagnata.
