= Fir Craibe =

Fir Craibe is a branch of the Fir Ol nEchmacht, one of the ancient peoples of Ireland.

The kingdom of the Fir Craibe extended from Limerick to the Palace of Fidach, a place thought to be located in north-eastern Aidhne. In later centuries the territory south of Aidhne, Thomond, would be annexed by Munster, which it is still counted as part of.

== Sources ==
- "Foras Feasa Éireann", Geoffrey Keating, 1636.
- "Leabhar Mor nGenealach", Dubhaltach MacFhirbhisigh, 1649–1666.
- "Ogyia", Ruaidhri O Flaithbheartaigh, 1684.
- "The History of Mayo", T.H.Knox, 1908.
