= Gilla Cómáin mac Gilla Samthainde =

Irish poet

Gilla Cóemáin mac Gilla Samthainde was a Medieval Irish poet (fl. 1072).

He was author of Annálad anall uile, a poem of fifty-eight quatrains, and a number of other works. Some of his works were incorporated into Lebor Gabála Érenn.
