= Duff River =

River in Counties Leitrim and Sligo, Ireland

Coordinates: 54.46023°N 8.3798°W

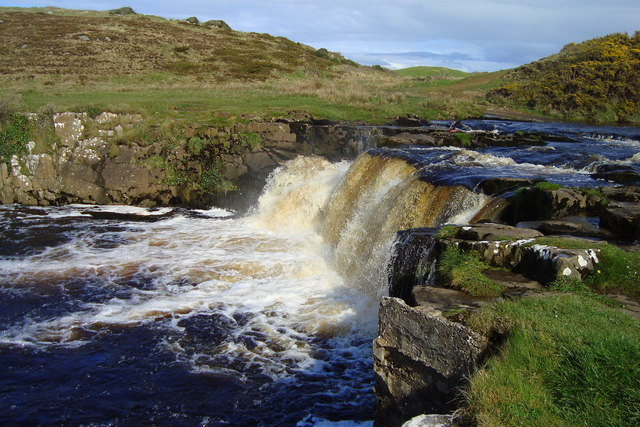
Falls on the River Duff

The River Duff, or Bunduff, (Irish: An Dubh, meaning 'the black') is a river in County Sligo and County Leitrim, Ireland. The River Duff is 14 miles (23 km) long, flowing from Glenade Valley in County Leitrim to the sea. In County Leitrim it is also known as the Black River. It is joined by the Ballanaghtrillick River, which runs out of the Horseshoe Pass.

This river along with the Drowes formed the ancient border between Ulster and Connacht.

The Duff River is good for beginner white-water rafters, kayakers, and the like, with approximately 500 metres of class 2/3 rapids and a three-metre (10 feet) drop at the end. As it is a short, mountain river, draining the Dartry Mountains and the Ben Bulben, water levels are known to change very quickly, after heavy rain.

The Duff River is also popular for salmon fishing. The fishing season is from 1 February to 30 September. The most fished reaches are the lower three and a half miles.
