= Dallán mac Móre =

Dallán mac Móre, fl. c. 900, was an Irish poet, and chief bard to King Cerball mac Muirecáin of Leinster (reigned 885–909. The poem The Song of Cerball's Sword is attributed to Dallán.

== Cath Bealach Mughna ==
Sub anno 903, the Annals of the Four Masters preserve part of a lament on those killed at the battle of Bealach Mugna:

Cormac of Feimhin, Fogartach,
Colman, Ceallach of the hard conflicts,
They perished with many thousands
in the great battle of Bealach-Mughna.
Flann of Teamhair, of the plain of Tailltin,
Cearbhall of Carman without fail,
On the seventh of the Calends of September,
gained the battle of which hundreds were joyful.
The bishop, the souls' director,
the renowned, illustrious doctor,
King of Caiseal, King of Iarmumha;
O God! alas for Cormac!
