= Tadg mac Conchobair =

Tadg mac Conchobair (died 900) was a king of Connacht from the Uí Briúin branch of the Connachta. He was the son of Conchobar mac Taidg Mór (died 882), a previous king, the second of his three sons to rule in succession, succeeding his brother Áed mac Conchobair (died 888). He was of the Síl Muiredaig sept of the Uí Briúin. He ruled from 888-900.

== Biography ==
His brother had met his death fighting the Vikings on the side of the high king of Ireland. the annals record that in 891 the men of North Connacht and specifically the Ui Amalgada, a branch of the Uí Fiachrach defeated Norse forces in 891 and slew their leader.

Connacht was generally subjected to the Ui Neill high kings at this time and in 897, the high king Flann Sinna (died 916) attacked Connacht and secured its pledges. In 899 though, the Connachta made a raid into Westmeath but were defeated at Áth Luain. The Annals of the Four Masters associate this raid with the renewal of the fair of Connacht by Tadg. The annals record Tadg's death the next year "after prolonged suffering"

His son Cathal mac Tadg (died 973) was also a king of Connacht: if so, this son died c.73 years after his father; it is alternatively said that the king Cathal mac Tadg who died in 973 was the son of Tadg (king 925-956), son of Cathal (king 900-925), son of Conchobar (king 872-882)

== Annalistic references ==
- M894.9 - The renewal of the fair of Connacht by Tadhg, son of Conchobhar;
