= Fir Ol nEchmacht =

Fir Ol nEchmacht was the name of a group of people living in pre-historic Ireland. The name may be translated as 'men' (Fir) of the 'people' (Ol, possibly from Dal) 'of Echmacht' (nEchmacht), the last being the given name of the people or their territory, perhaps from ech ('horse') and macht ('death', 'wonderful', or 'across the sea'). T. F. O'Rahilly believed they are connected to, or the same as, the Nagnatae tribe, mentioned in Ptolemy's second-century AD work Geography, but O'Rahilly's model of the early populating of Ireland is not well-accepted by modern scholars.

Virtually all of Ireland west of the Shannon was once named after the Fir Ol nEchmacht and was called Cóiced Ol nEchmacht until the early historic era (c. 5th-7th centuries).

It was only with the rise of the Connachta dynasty that the term Fir Ol nEchmacht was dropped and the province was renamed Connacht.
