= Moylena Ground =

Cricket ground in Antrim, Northern Ireland

Coordinates: 54°42′10.72″N 6°12′05.79″W

- Location: Antrim, Northern Ireland
- As of 29 August 2011; Source: Ground profile

Moylena Ground is a cricket ground in Antrim, Northern Ireland and the home of Muckamore Cricket Club. In 2005, the ground hosted two List A matches in the 2005 ICC Trophy. The first of these was between Denmark and Uganda, which resulted in a Danish victory by 28 runs, The second saw Canada play Oman, which resulted in 2 wicket victory for Canada.
