= Cerball mac Muirecáin =

Cerball mac Muirecáin (died 909) was king of Leinster. He was the son of Muirecán mac Diarmata and a member of the Uí Fáeláin, the descendants of Fáelán mac Murchado (died 738), of one of three septs of the Uí Dúnlainge of modern County Kildare in Ireland.

Cerball succeeded his distant cousin Muiredach mac Brain of the Uí Dúnchada sept as king of Leinster on Muiredach's death in 885. Unlike Muiredach, who was lay abbot of Kildare as well as king, Cerball appears to have been king only as one Lergus son of Cruinnén, bishop of Kildare, was killed in the battle of the Pilgrim, fought by Flann Sinna, the High King of Ireland, against the Vikings of Dublin in 888. That same year, the neighbouring king of Osraige Cerball mac Dúnlainge, who had repeatedly attacked Leinster over the previous decades in an attempt to make it subject to him, died.

The Annals of Ulster contain relatively few reports of Cerball's reign. In 902 they state that he, together with Máel Finnia mac Flannacain of Brega lead an expedition to Dublin which drove the "foreigners", the Vikings and Norse-Gaels, from Ireland. He fought alongside Flann (whose daughter Gormflaith ingen Flann Sinna he married), against the men of Munster at the Battle of Bellaghmoon (near Castledermot) where Cormac mac Cuilennáin, King of Munster and Bishop of Cashel, was killed.

Cerball died in 909, when the Annals of Ulster report:

Cerball son of Muirecán, an excellent king of the Laigin, died of a sickness.

Given the biases of the Annals of Ulster, it is understood that Cerball had been a reliable ally of his father-in-law Flann Sinna. He was memorialised in a poem by his poet, Dallán mac Móre.

After Cerball's death, Gormflaith married Niall Glúndub. Later traditions had it that she had wished to marry Cormac mac Cuilennáin, but that he had taken vows of celibacy, so for reasons of state she was married to the brutal Cerball, before finding a short period of happiness with Niall, who died in battle in 917. These tales appear to be largely poetic invention.

Cerball was succeeded by his distant cousin Augaire mac Ailella of the Uí Muiredaig sept. He himself had no recorded issue.
