= Connacht =

Traditional province in the west of Ireland

Connacht Connachta (Irish)
- Flag Coat of arms

- Coordinates: 54°N 9°W
- State: Ireland
- Counties: Galway; Leitrim; Mayo; Roscommon; Sligo

Government
  - Teachtaí Dála: 6 Independent TDs; 5 Fine Gael TDs; 4 Fianna Fáil TDs; 4 Sinn Féin TDs
  - MEPs^{[a]}: 2 Fine Gael MEPs; 1 Sinn Féin MEP; 1 Independent MEP

Area
  - Total: 17,713 km^{2} (6,839 sq mi)
  - Rank: 4th

Population (2022)
  - Total: 589,338
  - Rank: 4th
  - Density: 33.271/km^{2} (86.173/sq mi)
- Time zone: UTC±0 (WET)
  - Summer (DST): UTC+1 (IST)
- Eircode routing keys: Beginning with F, H, N (primarily)
- Telephone area codes: 07x, 09x (primarily)
- ISO 3166 code: IE-C
- a. Connacht is part of the Midlands–North-West constituency; the five Connacht counties contain 36.2% of the population of this constituency.

Connacht, also spelled Connaught (/ˈkɒnɔːt, ˈkɒnə(x)t/, Irish: Connachta [ˈkʊn̪ˠəxt̪ˠə] or Cúige Chonnacht [ˌkuːɟə ˈxʊn̪ˠəxt̪ˠ]), is the smallest and least populous of the four provinces of Ireland, situated in the west of Ireland. Until the ninth century it consisted of several independent major Gaelic kingdoms (Uí Fiachrach, Uí Briúin, Uí Maine, Conmhaicne, and Delbhna).

Between the reigns of Conchobar mac Taidg Mór (died 882) and his descendant, Aedh mac Ruaidri Ó Conchobair (reigned 1228–33), it became a kingdom under the rule of the Uí Briúin Aí dynasty, whose ruling sept adopted the surname Ua Conchobair. It is also the birth place of the legendary Niall of the Nine hostages. At its greatest extent, it incorporated the often independent Kingdom of Breifne, as well as vassalage from the lordships of western Mide and west Leinster. Two of its greatest kings, Tairrdelbach Ua Conchobair (1088–1156) and his son Ruaidri Ua Conchobair (c. 1115–1198) greatly expanded the kingdom's dominance, so much so that both became High King of Ireland.

The Kingdom of Connacht collapsed in the 1230s because of civil war within the royal dynasty, which enabled widespread Hiberno-Norman settlement under Richard Mór de Burgh, 1st Baron of Connaught, and his successors. The Norman colony in Connacht shrank from c. 1300 to c. 1360, with events such as the 1307 battle of Ahascragh (see Donnchad Muimnech Ó Cellaigh), the 1316 Second Battle of Athenry and the murder in June 1333 of William Donn de Burgh, 3rd Earl of Ulster, all leading to Gaelic resurgence and colonial withdrawal to towns such as Ballinrobe, Loughrea, Athenry, and Galway. Well into the 16th century, kingdoms such as Uí Maine and Tír Fhíacrach Múaidhe remained beyond English control, while many Norman families such as de Burgh, de Bermingham, de Exeter, de Staunton, became entirely Gaelicised. Only in the late 1500s, during the Tudor conquest of Ireland, was Connacht shired into its present counties.

Connacht's population was 1,418,859 in 1841. Then came the Great Famine of the 1840s, which began a 120-year decline to under 400,000. The province has a population of just under 590,000 according to the preliminary results of the 2022 census.

Anglicisation was less prominent in the west of Ireland, and Connacht today has the highest number of Irish language speakers among the four Irish provinces. Currently, the total percentage of people who consider themselves as Irish speakers in Connacht is 39.8% (more than 202,000 persons). There are Gaeltacht areas in Counties Galway and Mayo.

The province of Connacht has no official function for local government purposes, but it is an officially recognised subdivision of the Irish state. It is listed on ISO-3166-2 as one of the four provinces of Ireland and "IE-C" is attributed to Connacht as its country sub-division code. Along with counties from other provinces, Connacht is in the Midlands–North-West constituency for elections to the European Parliament.

== Name ==
The name comes from the medieval ruling dynasty, the Connacht, later Connachta, whose name means "descendants of Conn", from the mythical king Conn of the Hundred Battles. The name of the province in the Irish language is Connachta. Originally Connacht was a singular collective noun, but it came to be used only in the plural Connachta, partly by analogy with plural names of other dynastic territories like Ulaid and Laigin, and partly because the Connachta split into different branches. Before the Connachta dynasty, the province (cúige, "fifth") was known as Cóiced Ol nEchmacht. In Modern Irish, the province is usually called Cúige Chonnacht, "the Province of Connacht", where Chonnacht is plural genitive case with lenition of the C to Ch.

The usual English spelling in Ireland since the Gaelic revival is Connacht, the spelling of the disused Irish singular. The official English spelling during English and British rule was the anglicisation Connaught, pronounced /ˈkɒnɔːt/ or /ˈkɒnət/. This was used for the Connaught Rangers, an Irish regiment in the British Army; in the title of Queen Victoria's son Arthur, Duke of Connaught; and the Connaught Hotel, London, named after the Duke in 1917. Usage of the Connaught spelling is now in decline and is not a recognised version.

State bodies use Connacht, for example in Central Statistics Office census reports since 1926, and the name of the Connacht–Ulster European Parliament constituency of 1979–2004, although Connaught occurs in some statutes. Among newspapers, the Connaught Telegraph (founded 1830) retains the anglicised spelling in its name, whereas the Connacht Tribune (founded 1909) uses the Gaelic. Connacht Rugby who represent the region and are based in Galway, use the Gaelic spelling also.

== Geography and political divisions ==
The province is divided into five traditional counties, the fewest of any province. These are: Galway, Leitrim, Mayo, Roscommon and Sligo. Connacht is the smallest of the four Irish provinces both in terms of size and population. Galway is the only official city in the province.

County	Population (2022)	Area
Galway (Gaillimh)	276,451	6,151 km^{2} (2,375 sq mi)
Leitrim (Liatroim)	35,199	1,590 km^{2} (610 sq mi)
Mayo (Maigh Eo)	137,231	5,586 km^{2} (2,157 sq mi)
Roscommon (Ros Comáin)	70,259	2,548 km^{2} (984 sq mi)
Sligo (Sligeach)	70,198	1,838 km^{2} (710 sq mi)
Grand Total	589,338	17,713 km^{2} (6,839 sq mi)

=== Largest settlements ===
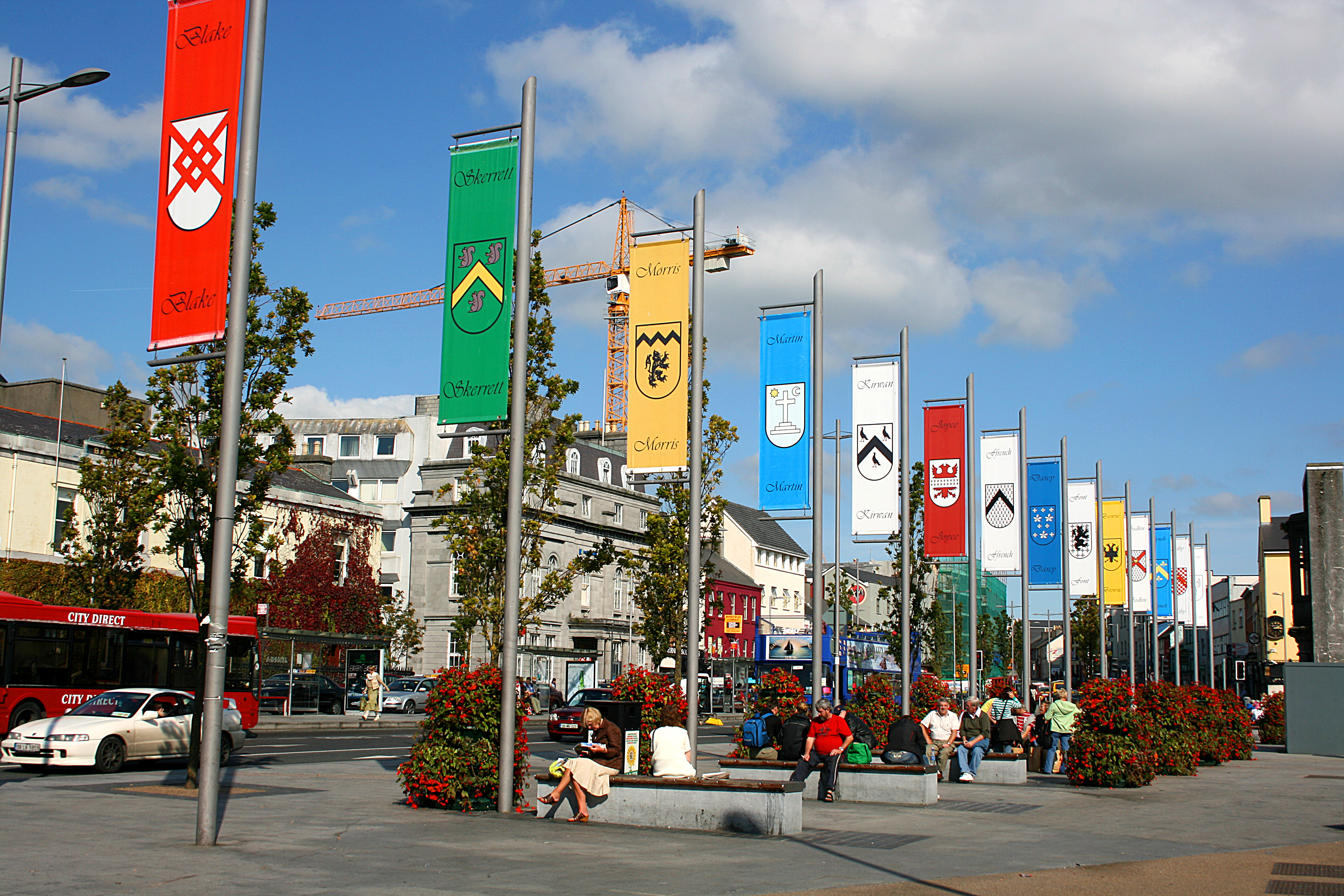
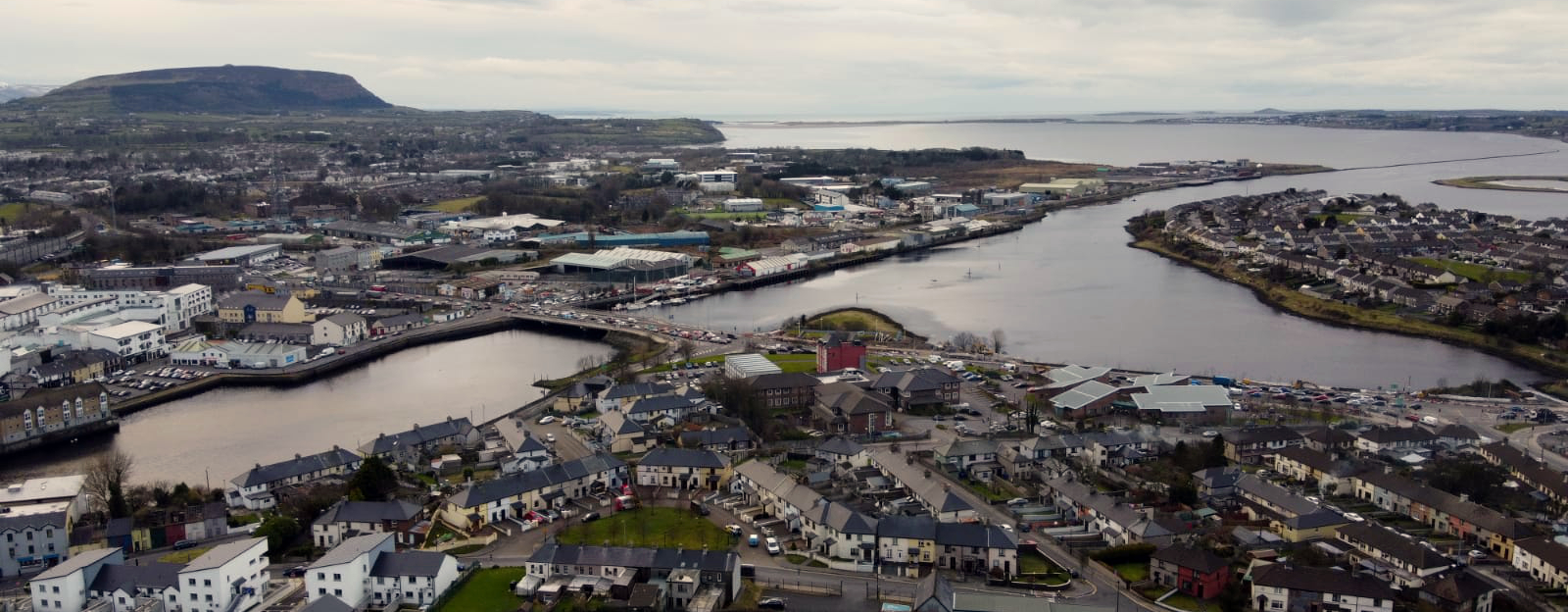
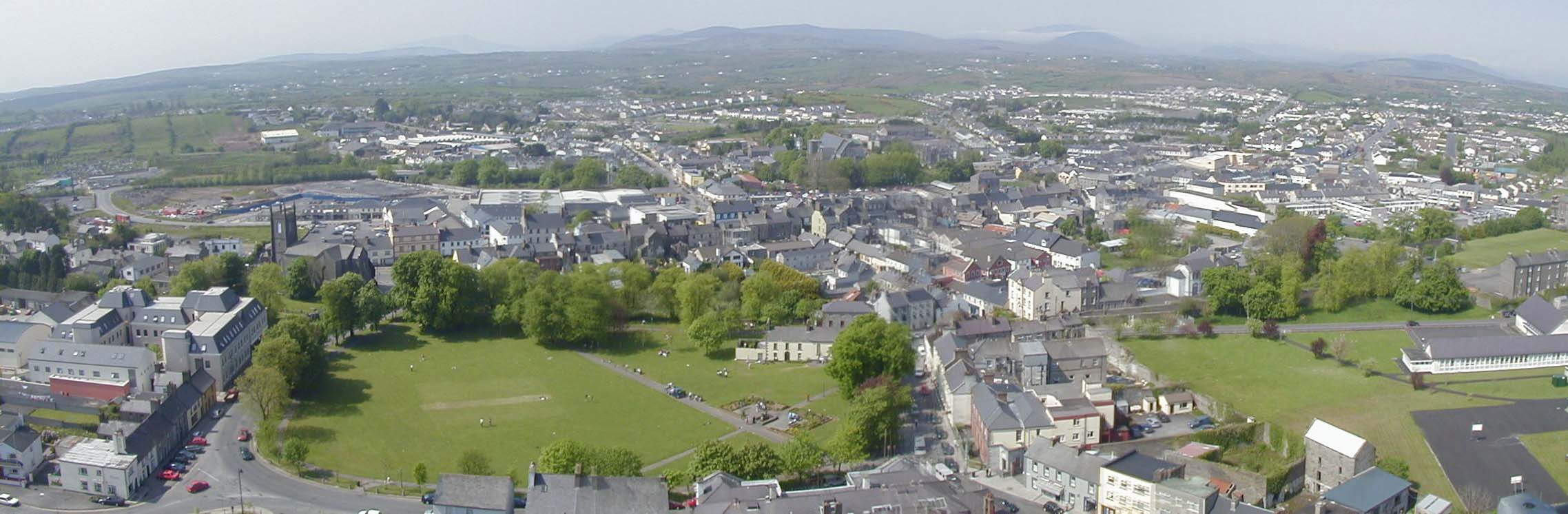
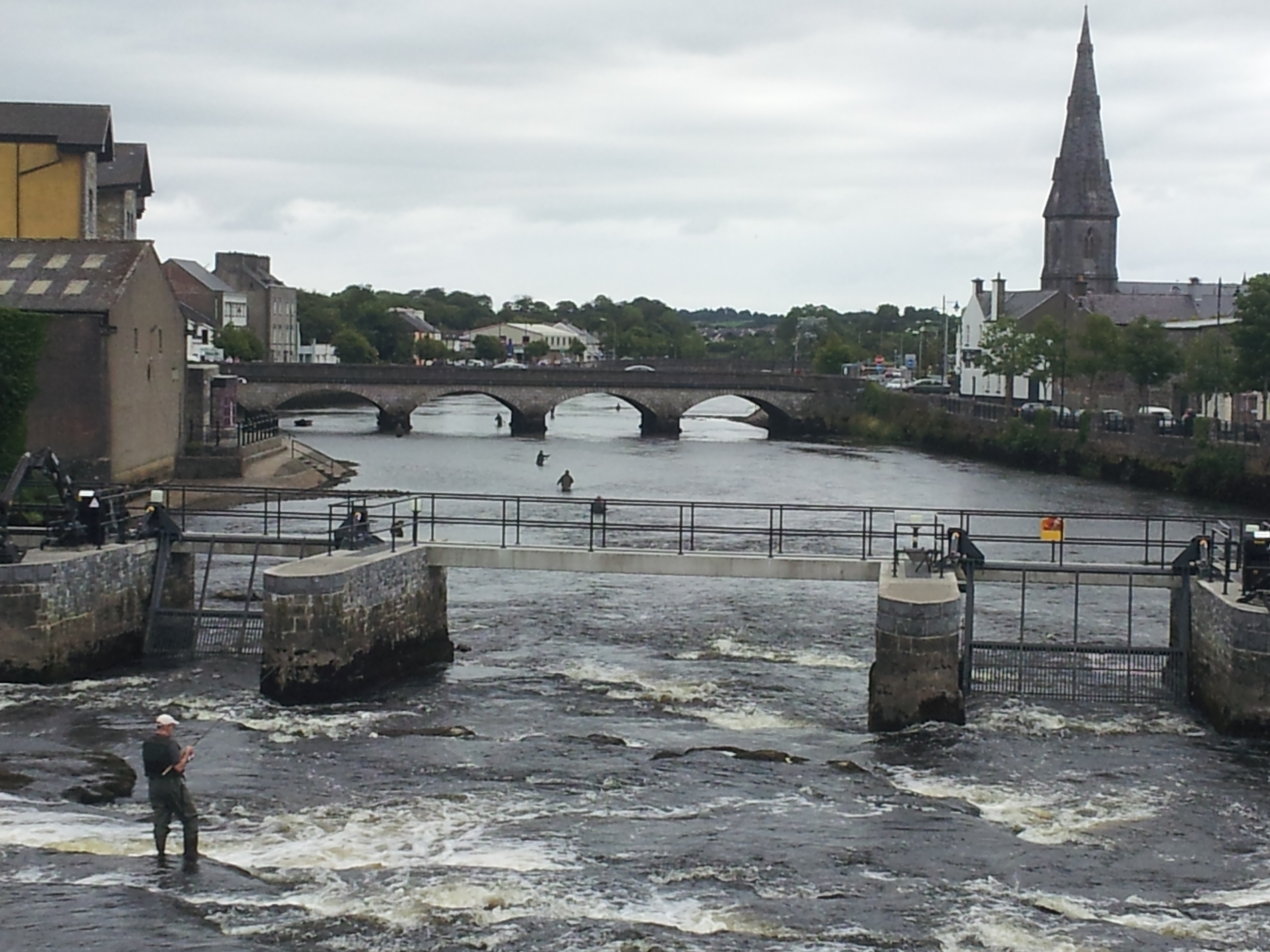
Largest population centres of Connacht in 2022
	Rank	City name	County	Pop.	Rank	City name	County	Pop.
Galway Sligo	1	Galway	County Galway	85,910	11	Carrick-on-Shannon	County Leitrim	4,743	Castlebar Ballina
Galway Sligo	2	Sligo	County Sligo	20,608	12	Athenry	County Galway	4,603	Castlebar Ballina
Galway Sligo	3	Castlebar	County Mayo	13,054	13	Claremorris	County Mayo	3,857	Castlebar Ballina
Galway Sligo	4	Ballina	County Mayo	10,556	14	Ballinrobe	County Mayo	3,148	Castlebar Ballina
Galway Sligo	5	Tuam	County Galway	9,647	15	Boyle	County Roscommon	2,915	Castlebar Ballina
Galway Sligo	6	Westport	County Mayo	6,872	16	Gort	County Galway	2,870	Castlebar Ballina
Galway Sligo	7	Ballinasloe	County Galway	6,597	17	Ballyhaunis	County Mayo	2,773	Castlebar Ballina
Galway Sligo	8	Roscommon	County Roscommon	6,555	18	Ballaghaderreen	County Roscommon	2,387	Castlebar Ballina
Galway Sligo	9	Loughrea	County Galway	6,322	19	Castlerea	County Roscommon	2,348	Castlebar Ballina
Galway Sligo	10	Oranmore	County Galway	5,819	20	Bearna	County Galway	2,336	Castlebar Ballina

=== Physical geography ===
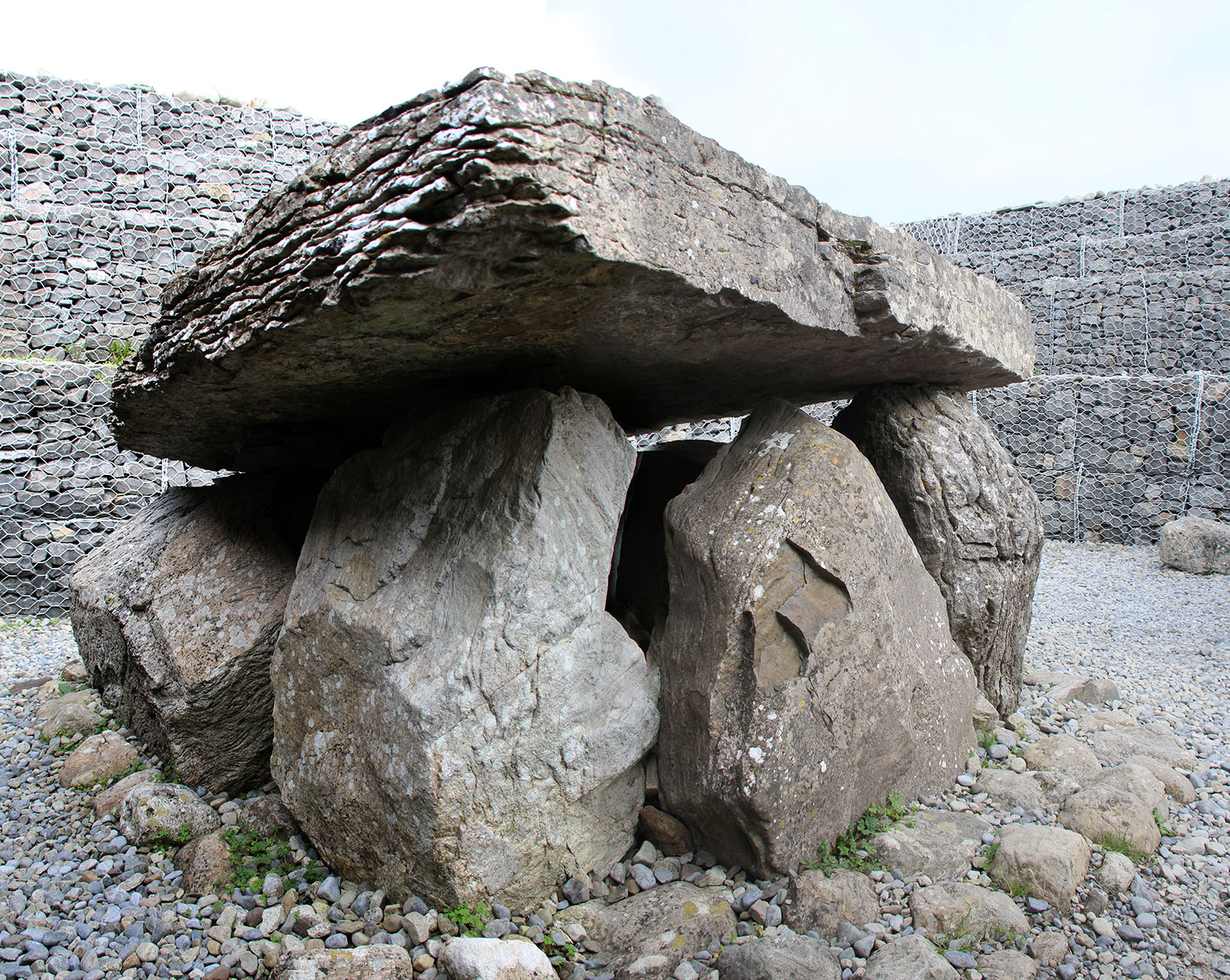
Passage Tomb, part of the Listoghil Complex at Carrowmore, County Sligo

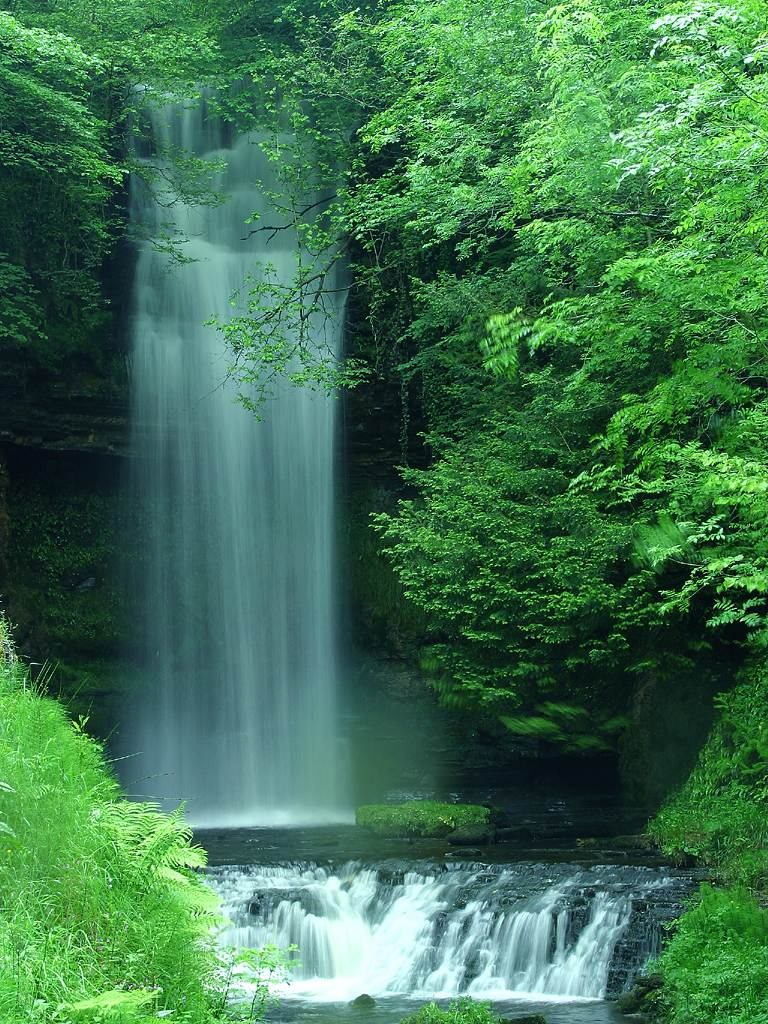
Glencar Waterfall, County Leitrim

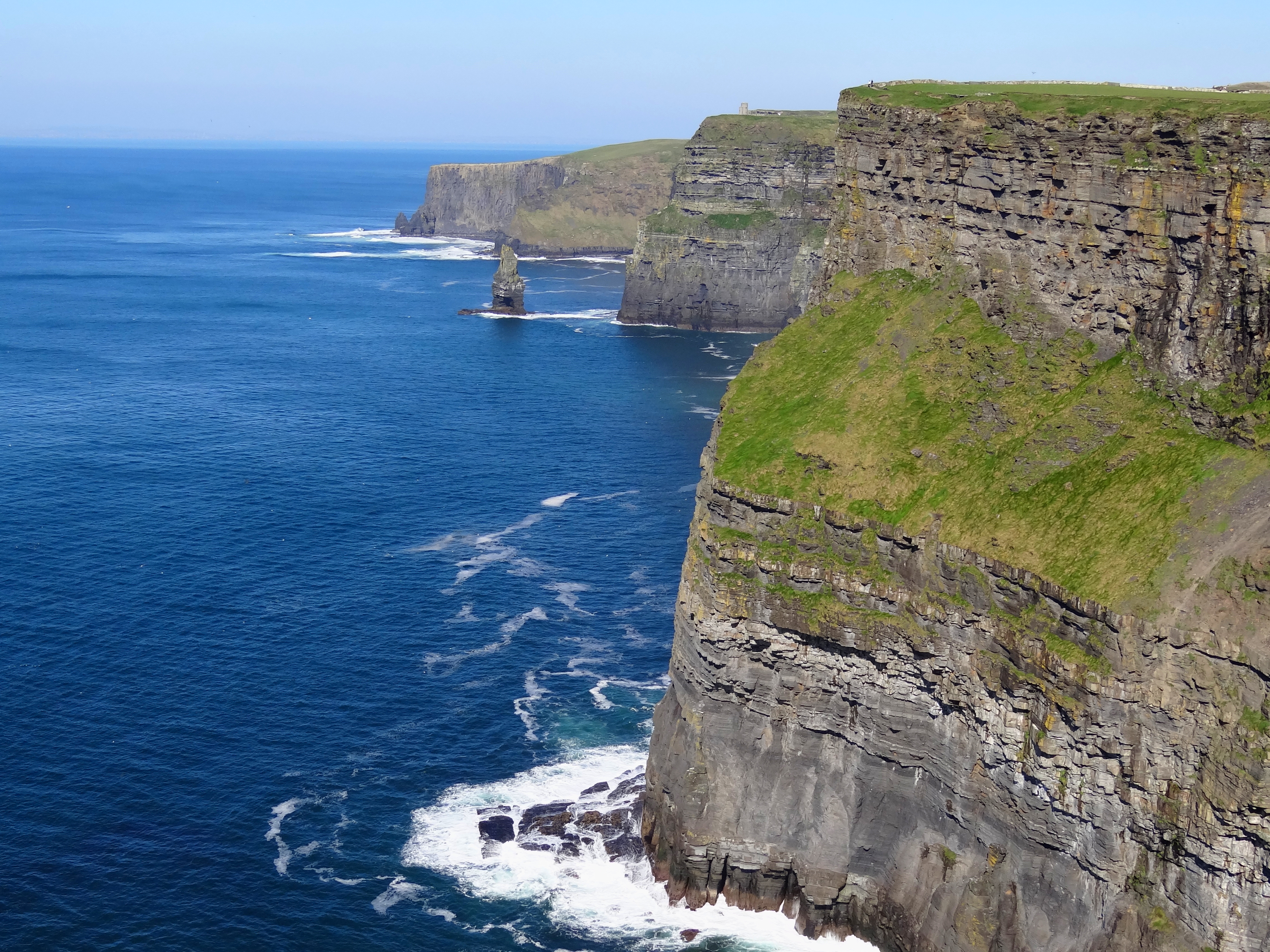
The Cliffs of Moher

The highest point of Connacht is Mweelrea (814 m), in County Mayo. The largest island in Connacht (and Ireland) is Achill. The biggest lake is Lough Corrib.

Much of the west coast (e.g. Connemara and Erris) is ruggedly inhospitable and not conducive for agriculture. It contains the main mountainous areas in Connacht, including the Twelve Bens, Maumturks, Mweelrea, Croagh Patrick, Nephin Beg, Ox Mountains, and Dartry Mountains.

Killary Harbour, one of Ireland's fjords (the others being Carlingford Lough and Lough Swilly), is located at the foot of Mweelrea. Connemara National Park is in County Galway. The Aran Islands, featuring prehistoric forts such as Dún Aonghasa, have been a regular tourist destination since the 19th century.

Inland areas such as east Galway, Roscommon and Sligo have enjoyed greater historical population density due to better agricultural land and infrastructure.

Rivers and lakes include the River Moy, River Corrib, the Shannon, Lough Mask, Lough Melvin, Lough Allen and Lough Gill.

== History ==
=== Early history ===
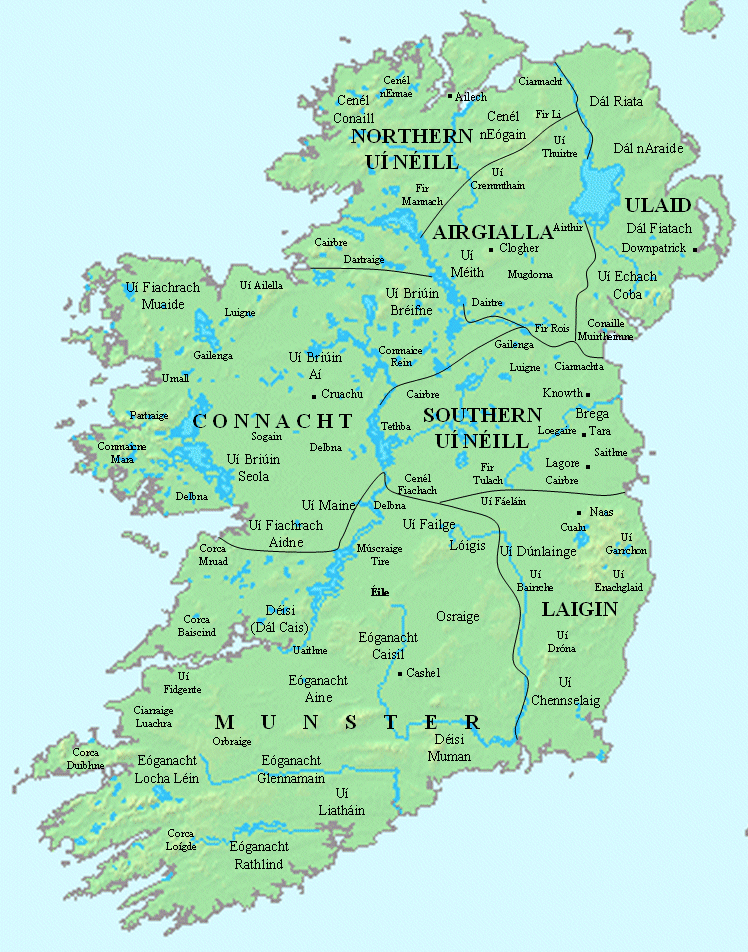
Early peoples and kingdoms of Ireland, c.800.

Up to the early historic era, Connacht then included County Clare, and was known as Cóiced Ol nEchmacht. Later myths state the Fir Bolg ruled all Ireland before the Tuatha Dé Danann arrived. When the Fir Bolg were defeated, the Tuatha Dé Danann drove them to Connacht. Sites such as the Céide Fields, Knocknarea, Listoghil, Carrowkeel Megalithic Cemetery and Rathcroghan, all demonstrate intensive occupation of Connacht far back into prehistory. Enigmatic artefacts such as the Turoe stone and the Castlestrange stone, whatever their purpose, denote the ambition and achievement of those societies, and their contact with the La Tène culture of mainland Europe. In the early historic era (c. A.D. 300 – c. A.D. 600), Ol nEchmacht was not a united kingdom but a region. It comprised dozens of major and minor túath; rulers of larger túatha (Maigh Seóla, Uí Maine, Aidhne and Máenmag) were accorded high-king status, while peoples such as the Gailenga, Corco Moga and Senchineoil were lesser peoples given the status of Déisi. All were termed kingdoms, but according to a graded status, denoting each according the likes of lord, count, earl, king.

Some of the more notable peoples or ethnic groups included the following:

- Conmaicne – west coast and northern areas of County Galway
- Dartraige – north-west County Leitrim
- Delbhna – south County Roscommon, and both sides of the Lough Corrib
- Fir Craibe – County Clare (then part of Connacht) and south-west Galway
- Fir Domnann – west coast of Mayo
- Soghain – most of east-central County Galway

By the 5th century, the pre-historic nations such as the Auteini and Nagnatae – recorded by Ptolemy (c. AD 90 – c. 168) in Geography – gave way to dynasties. This is demonstrated in the noun moccu in names such as Muirchu moccu Machtheni, which indicated a person was of the Machtheni people. As evidenced by kings such as Mac Cairthinn mac Coelboth (died 446) and Ailill Molt (died c. 482), even by the 5th century the gens was giving way to kinship all over Ireland, as both men were identified as of the Uí Enechglaiss and Uí Fiachrach dynasties, not of tribes. By 700, moccu had evolved into mac 'son' and patronymics had become surnames formed with hua 'descendant' (later Mac and Ó).

During the mid-8th century, what is now County Clare was absorbed into Thomond by the Déisi Tuisceart. It has remained a part of the province of Munster ever since.

The name Connacht arose from the most successful of these early dynasties, The Connachta. By 1050, they had extended their rule from Rathcroghan in north County Roscommon to large areas of what are now County Galway, County Mayo, County Sligo, and County Leitrim. The dynastic term was from then on applied to the overall geographic area containing those counties, and has remained so ever since.

=== Kingdom of Connacht ===
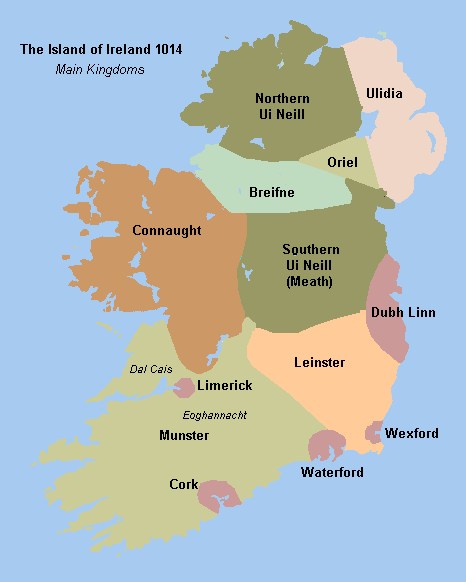
Ireland's main kingdoms as of 1014. Clockwise from the north-east they are Ulaid, Airgíalla, Mide, Laigin, Munster, Connaught, Breifne and Aileach. The city-states of Dyflin, Weisforthe, Vedrafjord, Corcach and Luimneach are shown. Missing are kingdoms of Osraighe and Uí Maine.

The most successful sept of the Connachta were the Ó Conchobair of Síol Muireadaigh. They derived their surname from Conchobar mac Taidg Mór (c. 800 – 882), from whom all subsequent Ó Conchobair Kings of Connacht descended.

Conchobar was a nominal vassal of Máel Sechnaill mac Máele Ruanaid, High King of Ireland (died 862). He married Máel Sechnaill's daughter, Ailbe, and had sons Áed mac Conchobair (died 888), Tadg mac Conchobair (died 900) and Cathal mac Conchobair (died 925), all of whom subsequently reigned. Conchobar and his sons' descendants expanded the power of the Síol Muiredhaigh south into Uí Maine, west into Iar Connacht, and north into Uí Fiachrach Muaidhe and Bréifne.

By the reign of Áed in Gai Bernaig (1046–1067), Connacht's kings ruled much what is now the province. Yet the Ó Conchobair's contended for control with their cousins, the Ua Ruairc of Uí Briúin Bréifne. Four Ua Ruairc's achieved rule of the kingdom – Fergal Ua Ruairc (956–967), Art Uallach Ua Ruairc (1030–1046), Áed Ua Ruairc (1067–1087), and Domnall Ua Ruairc (1098–1102). In addition, the usurper Flaithbertaigh Ua Flaithbertaigh gained the kingship in 1092 by the expedient of blinding King Ruaidrí na Saide Buide. After 1102 the Ua Ruairc's and Ua Flaithbertaigh's were suborned and confined to their own kingdoms of Bréifne and Iar Connacht. From then until the death of the last king in 1474, the kingship was held exclusively by the Ó Conchobair's.

The single most substantial sub-kingdom in Connacht was Uí Maine, which at its maximum extent enclosed central and south County Roscommon, central, east-central and south County Galway, along with the territory of Lusmagh in Munster. Their rulers bore the family name Ó Ceallaigh; its spelling sometimes varying slightly from scribe to scribe.

Though the Ó Ceallaigh's were never elevated to the provincial kingship, Uí Maine existed as a semi-independent kingdom both before and after the demise of the Connacht kingship.

=== Kings and High Kings ===
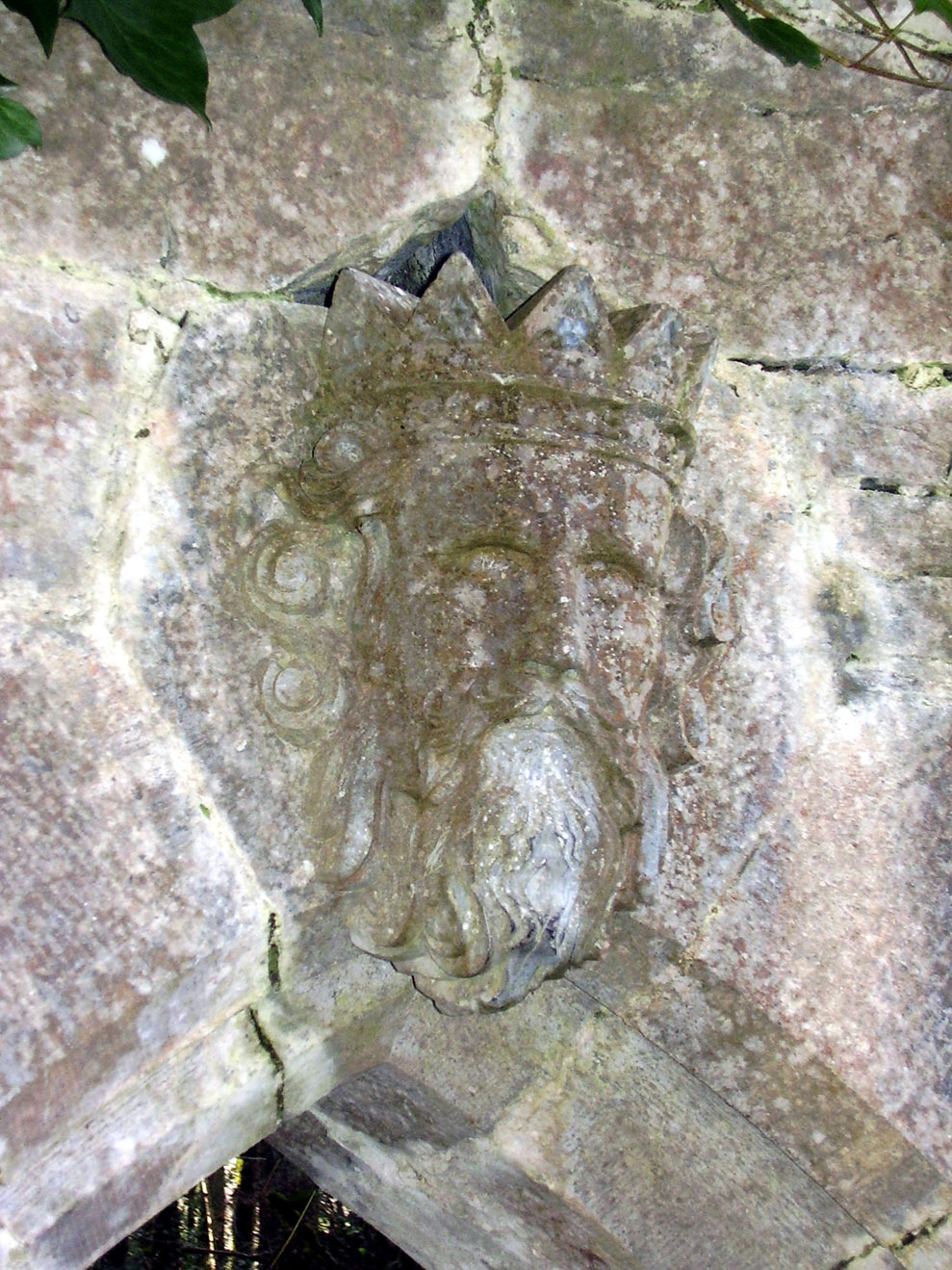
Stone carving of Ruaidrí Ua Conchobair from Cong Abbey

Under kings Tairrdelbach Ua Conchobair (1088–1156) and his son Ruaidrí Ua Conchobair (c. 1120–1198), Connacht became one of the five dominant kingdoms on the island. Tairrdelbach and Ruaidrí became the first men from west of the Shannon to gain the title Ard-Rí na hÉireann (High King of Ireland). In the latter's case, he was recognised all over the island in 1166 as Rí Éireann, or King of Ireland.

Tairrdelbach was highly innovative, building the first stone castles in Ireland, and more controversially, introducing the policy of primogeniture to a hostile Gaelic polity. Castles were built in the 1120s at Galway (where he based his fleet), Dunmore, Sligo and Ballinasloe, where he dug a new six-mile canal to divert the river Suck around the castle of Dun Ló. Churches, monasteries and dioceses were re-founded or created, works such as the Corpus Missal, the High Cross of Tuam and the Cross of Cong were sponsored by him.

Tairrdelbach annexed the Kingdom of Mide; its rulers, the Clann Cholmáin, became his vassals. This brought two of Ireland's five main kingdoms under the direct control of Connacht. He also asserted control over Dublin, which was even then being recognised as a kind of national capital.

His son, Ruaidrí, became king of Connacht "without any opposition" in 1156. One of his first acts as king was arresting three of his twenty-two brothers, "Brian Breifneach, Brian Luighneach, and Muircheartach Muimhneach" to prevent them from usurping him. He blinded Brian Breifneach as an extra precaution.

Ruaidrí was compelled to recognise Muirchertach Mac Lochlainn as Ard-Rí, though he went to war with him in 1159. Mac Lochlainn's murder in 1166 left Ruaidrí the unopposed ruler of all Ireland. He was crowned in 1166 at Dublin, "took the kingship of Ireland ...[and was] inaugurated king as honourably as any king of the Gaeidhil was ever inaugurated;" He was the first and last native ruler who was recognised by the Gaelic-Irish as full King of Ireland.

However, his expulsion of Dermot MacMurrough later that year brought about the Norman invasion of Ireland in 1169. Ruaidrí's inept response to events led to rebellion by his sons in 1177, and his deposition by Conchobar Maenmaige Ua Conchobair in 1183. Ruaidrí died at Cong in 1198, noted as the annals as late "King of Connacht and of All Ireland, both the Irish and the English."

=== High medieval era ===
Connacht was first raided by the Anglo-Normans in 1177 but not until 1237 did encastellation begin under Richard Mor de Burgh (c. 1194–1242). New towns were founded (Athenry, Headford, Castlebar) or former settlements expanded (Sligo, Roscommon, Loughrea, Ballymote). Both Gael and Gall acknowledged the supreme lordship of the Earl of Ulster; after the murder of the last earl in 1333, the Anglo-Irish split into different factions, the most powerful emerging as Bourke of Mac William Eighter in north Connacht, and Burke of Clanricarde in the south. They were regularly in and out of alliance with equally powerful Gaelic lords and kings such as Ó Conchobair of Síol Muireadaigh, Ó Cellaigh of Uí Maine and Mac Diarmata of Moylurg, in addition to extraprovincial powers such as Ó Briain of Thomond, FitzGerald of Kildare, Ó Domhnaill of Tír Chonaill.

Lesser lords of both ethnicities included Mac Donnchadha, Mac Goisdealbh, Mac Bhaildrín, Mac Siúrtáin, Ó hEaghra, Ó Flaithbheartaigh, Ó Dubhda, Ó Seachnasaigh, Ó Manacháin, Seoighe, Ó Máille, Ó Ruairc, Ó Madadháin, Bairéad, Ó Maolruanaidh, Ó hEidhin, Ó Fionnachtaigh, Ó Fallamhain, Breathnach, Mac Aireachtaigh, Ó Neachtain, Ó hAllmhuráin, Ó Fathaigh.

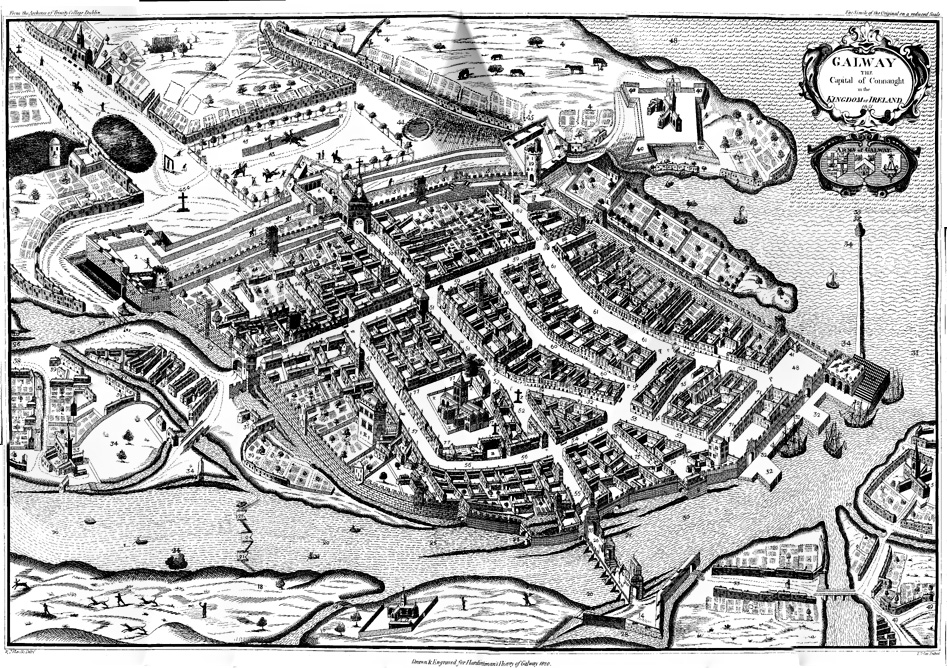
Galway map of c. 1651 displaying the medieval town, which now forms the modern city centre

The town of Galway was the only significant urban area in the province. Its inhabitants governed themselves under charter of the king of England. Its merchant families, The Tribes of Galway, traded not only with the lordships around them and in Ireland, but with England, France, and Spain. Its mayor enjoyed supreme power but only for the length of his office, rarely more than a year. Galway's inhabitants were of mixed descent, its families bearing surnames of Gaelic, French, English, Welsh, Norman and other origins.

Connacht was the site of two of the bloodiest battles in Irish history, the Second Battle of Athenry (1316) and the Battle of Knockdoe (1504). The casualties of both battles were measured in several thousand, unusually high for Irish warfare. A third battle at Aughrim in 1691 resulted in an estimated 10,000 deaths.

All of Connacht's lordships remained in states of full or semi-independence from other Gaelic-Irish and Anglo-Irish rulers until the late 16th century, when the Tudor conquest of Ireland (1534–1603) brought all under the direct rule of King James I of England. The counties were created from c. 1569 onwards.

=== Confederate and Williamite Wars ===
During the 17th century representatives from Connacht played leading roles in Confederate Ireland and during the Williamite War in Ireland. Its main town, Galway, endured several sieges (see Sieges of Galway), while warfare, plague, famine and sectarian massacres killed about a third of the population by 1655. One of the last battles fought in pre-20th century Ireland occurred in Connacht, the Battle of Aughrim on 12 July 1691.

=== Early modern era ===
Flag of the short-lived "Republic of Connacht"

Connacht was mainly at peace between 1691 and 1798. In 1798 Connacht was a major backdrop to the Irish Rebellion of 1798 when French forces under General Jean Humbert of the French Republic landed in Killala, County Mayo to link up with the United Irishmen. Together, the French army and United Irishmen rebels defeated a force of Crown troops at the Races of Castlebar before proclaiming the Irish Republic, which later became better known as the "Republic of Connacht" as its area of effective control never extended beyond the province. The Republic, and the Rebellion itself, was effectively crushed at the Battle of Ballinamuck.

A population explosion in the early 18th century was curbed by the Irish Famine, which led to many deaths and some emigration. Its memory has been overshadowed by the Great Famine (Ireland) one hundred years later.

=== The Famine to World War I ===
Connacht was the worst hit area in Ireland during the Great Famine, in particular, counties Mayo and Roscommon. In the census of 1841, the population of Connacht stood at 1,418,859, the highest ever recorded. By 1851, the population had fallen to 1,010,031 and would continue to decline until the late 20th century.

== Politics ==
Connacht–Ulster was one of Ireland's four regional European Parliament constituencies until it was superseded in 2004 by the constituency of North-West.

== Irish language ==
The Irish language is spoken in the Gaeltacht areas of Counties Mayo and Galway, the largest area being in the west of County Galway. The Galway Gaeltacht is the largest Irish-speaking region in Ireland, taking in Cois Fharraige, parts of Connemara, Conamara Theas, the Aran Islands, Dúithche Sheoigeach (Joyce Country) and the Galway City Gaeltacht. Irish-speaking areas in County Mayo can be found in Iorras, Acaill and Tourmakeady.

According to the 2016 census, Irish is spoken outside of the education system on a daily basis by 9,455 people in the Galway County Gaeltacht areas.

There are 202,667 Irish speakers in the province, over 84,000 in Galway and more than 55,000 in Mayo. There is also the 4,265 attending the 18 Gaelscoileanna (Irish language primary schools) and three Gaelcholáiste (Irish language secondary schools) outside the Gaeltacht across the province. Between 7% and 10% of the province are either native Irish speakers from the Gaeltacht, in Irish medium education or native Irish speakers who no longer live in Gaeltacht areas but still live in the province.

== Sport ==
=== Gaelic games ===
Gaelic football and hurling dominate sport in Connacht with 212 Gaelic Athletic Association affiliated clubs in the province.

Gaelic football is played throughout the province with the five counties annually competing in the Connacht Senior Football Championship to determine the provincial champion. Galway are the most successful side in Connacht with 48 Connacht titles and 9 All-Ireland Senior Football Championship. Mayo have been the dominant force in the province in recent years winning a five-in-a-row of Connacht titles from 2011 to 2015, and have regularly reached the semi-finals and finals of the All-Ireland Senior Football Championship. No football team from Connacht has won the All-Ireland since 2001, until recently when Mayo won back Sam in 2026 ending their 75 year drought since 1951.

Hurling in Connacht mostly played in County Galway. Galway is the only team in the province to compete in the All-Ireland Senior Hurling Championship winning the Liam MacCarthy Cup five times. The Galway hurling team compete in the Leinster Senior Hurling Championship due to the lack of competition in the province.

=== Rugby union ===
Connacht is represented by Connacht Rugby in the United Rugby Championship and the Rugby Champions Cup. Connacht home games are played in the Galway Sportsgrounds in Galway. During the 2015/2016 Season of the Pro12, Connacht, for the first time, reached the play off stages of the competition and won the final in Edinburgh against rivals Leinster. It was their first ever Pro12 title.

Connacht-based teams who have played in the All-Ireland League include Buccaneers RFC, Galway Corinthians RFC, Galwegians RFC, Connemara RFC, Ballina RFC and Sligo RFC.

=== Other sports ===
Some other sports are overseen by provincial bodies, including in association football, where the Connacht Football Association is the governing body for a number of Connacht league and cup competitions. Traditionally there have been two main senior men's teams from the province that compete on a national level, Galway United F.C. and Sligo Rovers F.C. Both clubs have won various domestic honours.

Cricket is a minor, but growing, sport within the province. The Connacht Cricket Union, founded in 2010, is the governing body for cricket in the province. There are cricket clubs based in Ballaghaderreen, Ballyhaunis, Galway, and Sligo. Connacht does not currently enter a team into the provincial competitions.

== See also ==
- Coin of Connaught
- Connacht Senior Football Championship – Annual Gaelic football competition played on two continents
- Corca Fhir Trí – Irish Clan
- Duke of Connaught – Title in the Peerage of the United Kingdom (1874–1943)
- Galway city – City in Connacht, Ireland
- Grace O'Malley – Irish pirate and chieftain (c. 1530–1603)
- Kings of Connacht
- Kings of Luighne Connacht – Ancient Irish kings
- Kings of Sliabh Lugha
- Kings of Uí Fiachrach Muaidhe
- Kings of Uí Maine
- Kings of Umaill – Rulers in western Ireland
- List of Cities and Towns in Connacht by population
- Lords of Connaught – Irish lordship
- The Connaught Rangers
