= Perceptions of the female body in medieval Europe =

In medieval Europe, the female body was seen (by men, at any rate) as an inferior, subordinate version of the male body.

== Menstruation ==
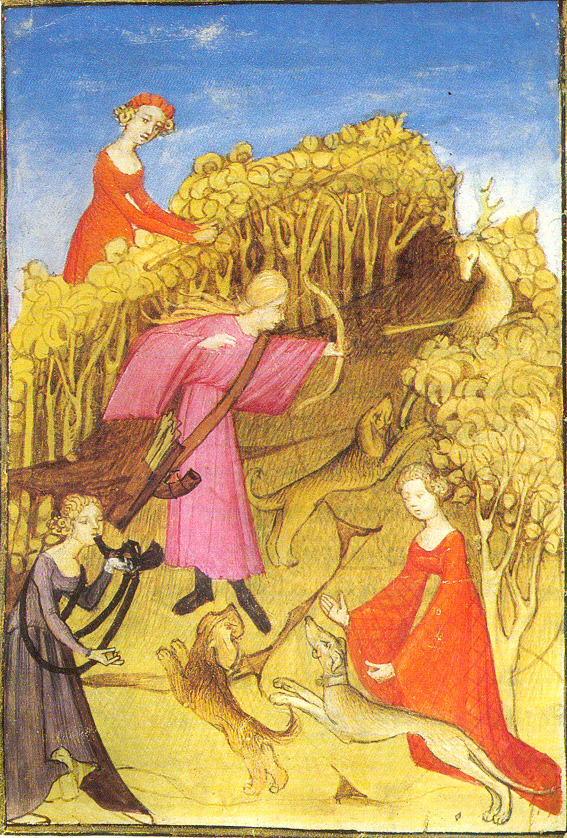
Women hunting, c. 1407–09. Note the golden hair and long limbs

While male bodies were praised (by other men) for their heat, women were likened to children; smaller, colder, smoother. Where the male body excreted extra heat and four temperaments, the female instead used menstruation. Like the study of the humours, menstruation could be used to determine the health of a woman, her character, and even her intellectual ability. Saint Cecilia was famously put into a bath of boiling water, but, due to her cold female body, was not affected. Like menstrual blood, female vaginal discharge could be used to determine character. From the Guide "from your flesh's vessel, does there come the small of aromas or sweet balm? … Are you not come from foul slime? Are you not a vessel of filth?" What a woman carried inside her was an indication of her spiritual and moral character. If the smell was good, so too was she; if not, she was but "a vessel of filth." It was not only men who wrote on the subject, however. Female Welsh poet Gwerful Mechain wrote a poem titled "To the Vagina", and women with access to education and time (primarily those in nunneries) wrote on the potential sanctification of a woman's body.

== Beauty and ugliness ==
Along with smell, a woman’s physical appearance was also indicative of her moral character. Outward physical beauty was a sign of high moral virtue, and physical ugliness was an indication of suspect morality. However, even beautiful women were potentially dangerous, as they could entice men toward sexual sin. According to Liz Herbert McAvoy, "Salvation was always jeopardized by the unruly flesh … the flesh eventually took on a synonymy with the female and her dangerously seductive body. Moreover, it was a body which could not only corrupt men from without but also the woman herself from within." The danger of a beautiful woman is alluded to in the Irish saga Echtra mac nEchach Muigmedóin, concerning Niall of the Nine Hostages: a young slave mother Cairenn with curly black hair gives birth to the son of a king, but is frightened by the queen Mongfind, who is wicked, beautiful, with long fair hair. This harkens back to the feelings of danger posed by beautiful women. Ugly women were cursed by God and obviously evil, but beautiful women could also be wicked and instruments of the devil.

Further, as beauty was a gift of God, obvious attempts to augment or increase one's beauty could indicate sinful pride. A like of "beauty products exposed a great hubris, a woman who tried to make herself more beautiful than she appeared counted as one with Lucifer". Thus, "The medieval body was central to a process of social classification according to categories of age, health, sex and purity, which were regulated through constructed categories such as stigma and gender." The body was not so much a self-chosen expression of the self as an outward marker of inner morality, worthiness, and station.

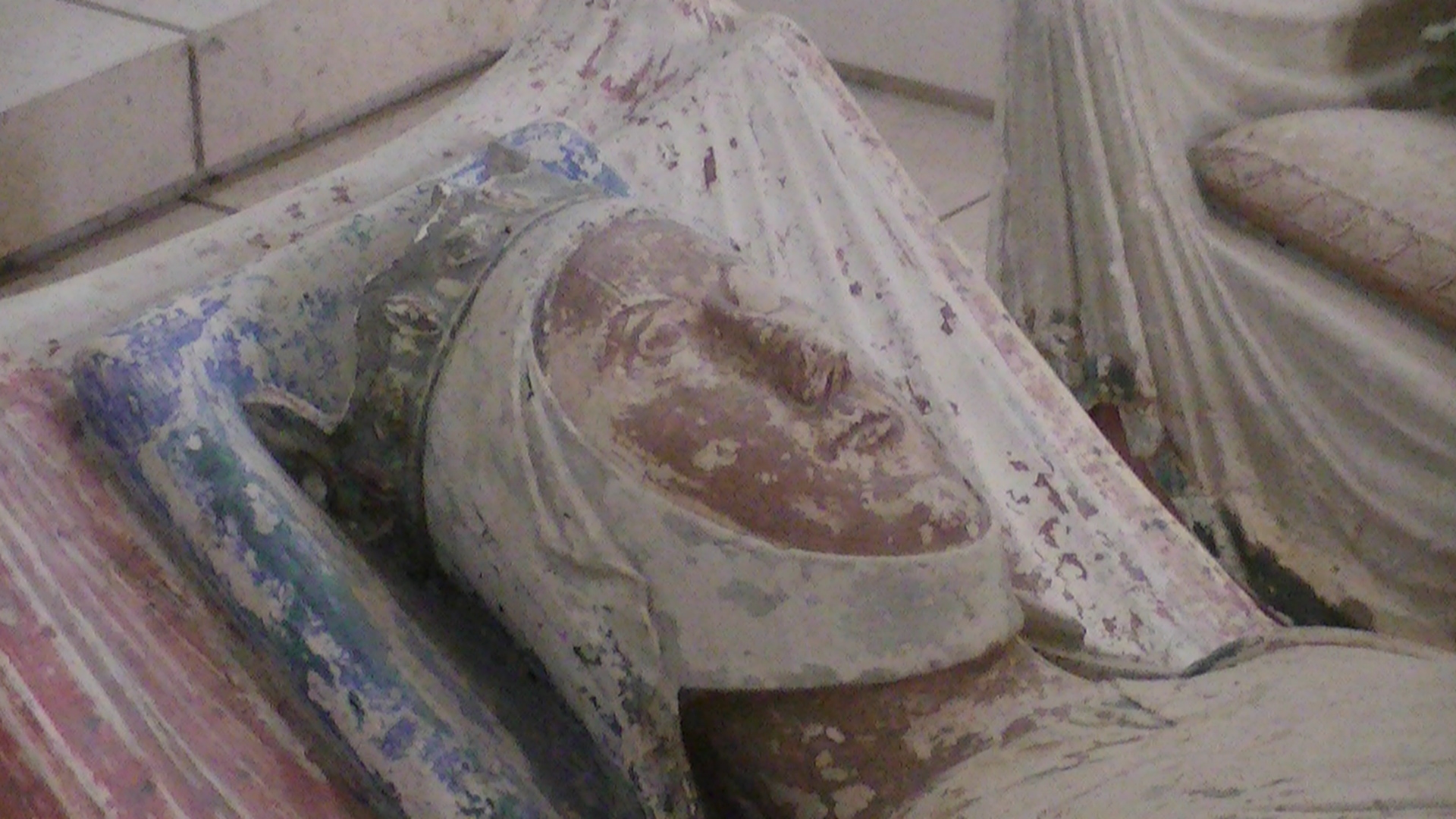
Funeral effigy of Eleanor of Aquitaine, said to be one of the most beautiful women of the medieval age. Note the long face and small lips

=== Original sin ===
Part of the rationale over the subordinate nature of female bodies came from the Christian teachings that held Eve, and thus all women, accountable for the fallen state of humanity. The best of women were virgins, as "the construction of the female chaste body as a sign of fallen humanity's alienation from its own properly angelic nature" only furthered the gap between pure virgins and women of a lower tier who were virgins no longer.

In The Romaunt of the Rose, "women are synonymous with sensual desire." The character Genius views the female with suspicion, seeing them as dangerous beings. He counsels husbands to have sex with their wives, but never to reveal any secrets to them, as they are unstable. In the same text, however, the female character of Nature comments that man "is proud, murderous, thieving, treacherous, envious." This trend is reflected in later literary traditions, notably Shakespeare's Lady MacBeth.

=== Beauty standards ===
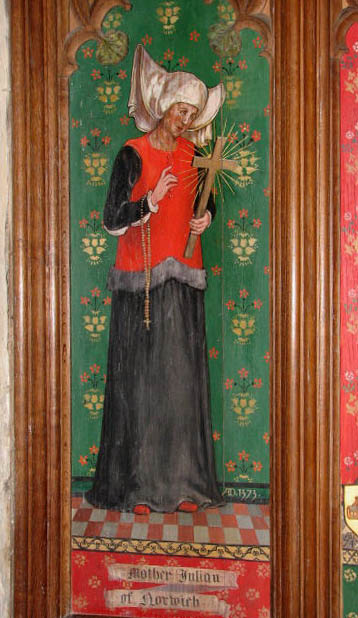
Julian of Norwich, in the Church of St Mary and St Andrew

The Middle Ages saw the rise of first seven, then nine, then eighteen, and finally thirty standards of beauty in European culture. There were "Three to be long — hands, legs, and hair; three to be white, three to be pink, three to be round, three to be narrow, and so on." Irish legends of sovereignty and kingship frequently featured a hag such as the one described in the poem Echtra Mac nEchnach, or Niall of the Nine Hostages: "twenty-seven rows of long teeth: the rough tusks were hard, like a buffalo’s horns are, [and] stretched around her ancient shoulders … her bitter eyes burned, on account of the harshness of her evil form.” Once transformed, the beautiful maiden is instead described as "well-shaped bright white shins and smooth thighs, carefully arranged golden blonde tresses, smooth, tender white shoulders, dark black eyebrows, and radiant skin." Some descriptions include "blackened skin" and "sores," a reference to leprosy. The leper was the opposite of medieval beauty and another sign of God's displeasure.

Claudio Da Soller examines the traditional European archetype of beauty: "a small head; blond hair; eyebrows set apart, long and arched; a narrow chin; large, prominent, colourful, and shining eyes, with long lashes; small, delicate ears; a long throat; a finely chiselled nose; small, even, sharp and white teeth, close together; red gums; red lips finely-drawn; a small mouth; and her face white, hairless, bright and smooth" and argues that, as these basic descriptions appear in nearly all European medieval descriptions of beauty, and thus should be regarded not merely as literary fall-backs but general descriptions. These features are "baby-like," seen in the large eyes, small hips, smooth skin, white teeth, small ears, and a slender nose. These standards can be seen in early Latin texts, as well as the Old Testament in the Song of Solomon. Thomas Aquinas' main requirement in a beautiful woman was based on Pythagoras' theory of proportion and relation to surrounding features.

== Social divides ==
Noblewomen such as Margery Kempe, often classified as mystics, wrote somewhat on the autonomy of the female body. Meanwhile, religious figures such as Julian of Norwich saw the female body as both a potential stumbling block to salvation and an instrument through which to deepen the personal relationship with Christ. The female body is a danger, both to men as a temptation, and to women as a corrupting influence on the female soul.

Julian of Norwich takes on overtly sexual tones in her Short Text referring to her encounters with Christ. Like Saint Cecilia, a "bride of Christ" and Mary Magdalene, Julian wished to be not only a spiritual but a physical "lover of Christ". This reflects the need for women to fit into the roles assigned to them—an unmarried woman was a dangerous woman, and moved outside the realm of perceived acceptability. Few records exist for any divide between common and elite women; rather, a universal standard of beauty applied to women of all classes, and with it a universal expectation. Women's bodies were for the bearing of children, be they field workers or queens.

== See also ==
- Pre-modern conceptions of whiteness
