= Conall Eachluath =

King of Munster

Conall Eachluath ("Conall of The Swift Steeds"; AD 359–434) was a King of Munster and ancestor of the Dal gCais through his son Cass (or Tál), their eponymous founder.

== Life ==
Conall was the son of Lugaid Mend and was the foster-son and friend of the Ard-ri Crimthann mac Fidaig, and before his death the monarch had exerted himself to obtain Conall’s future election to the throne of Mumha after Lugaid menn. This interference with the rule of succession was highly displeasing to the descendants of Eoghan, and they represented that Conall Corc, grandson of Ailill Flann beg, was the rightful successor to Lugaid. Conall Eachluath, consented willingly to refer the matter of the election to the judgment of an assembly of the chieftains of Leth-Mogha. They accordingly met together, and by them it was decided that Conall Core was entitled to the sovranty according to the rule established by Ailill Olom, the common ancestor of both candidates[sic]; seeing that Lugaid menn was of the race of Cormac Cas, and at his death it would be the turn of one of Eoghan’s descendants to rule over the province. The assembly moreover ordered hostages to be delivered to Conall eachluath to insure to him, or his next heir, the peaceful accession to the sovranty of Mumha immediately after Conall Core. This arrangement, whereby the will of Ailill Olom was confirmed and ratified, proved satisfactory to both claimants, and was duly executed, Conall eachluath peacefully succeeding Conall Corc.

Crimthan had such implicit confidence in Connal that he handed over to his care the many hostages he had taken, because, we are told, he felt that he could “ rely on the integrity of a prince who delivered up the possession of a crown that he was able to defend, for no other reason but because he had no right to it” In a poem contained in the “ Psalter of Cashel,” referring to Crimthan, it is said that:—

Numerous captives be in triumph led And hostages, the bonds of true submission,
These pledges and the prisoners of his wars He trusted in the hands of the brave Connal:
Than whom a prince of more integrity And stricter justice never wore a crown;
This prince for arms and martial skill renowned.
Enlarged the bounds of his command, and ruled With equity the countries he had won.

During his reign the men of Connachta made strenuous efforts to recover the territory beyond the Sinainn conquered by Lugaid menn; and Enna, in order that his forces might be free to oppose such attempts, was constrained to effect a compromise with the race of Eoghan. It was therefore agreed between them that the Dal-gCais and their posterity should rest content with their patrimonial inheritance of Tuadh-Mumha, and should surrender any claims over Des-Mumha to which they might become entitled when elected to rule over the whole province. The permanent hereditary possession of Des-Mumha, by this agreement, became vested in the Eoghanachta. The alternate right of succession to the supremacy of Mumha was however retained, but from this time forward, with few exceptions, was monopolised by the elder branch.

== Family ==
His wife was Coirpthe, a daughter of High King Eochaid Mugmedon. He had three sons, Tál Cas, Enna Airctheach and Énna Téith and one daughter, Cóemfhind who was the wife of Torna Éices.

He was succeeded in the kingship by his eldest son Enna Airctheach (the plunderer) and then to his younger son Cas. (Note: See Twigge, page 12)
