= Tál Cas =

Legendary founder of the Gaelic Irish clan Dál gCais

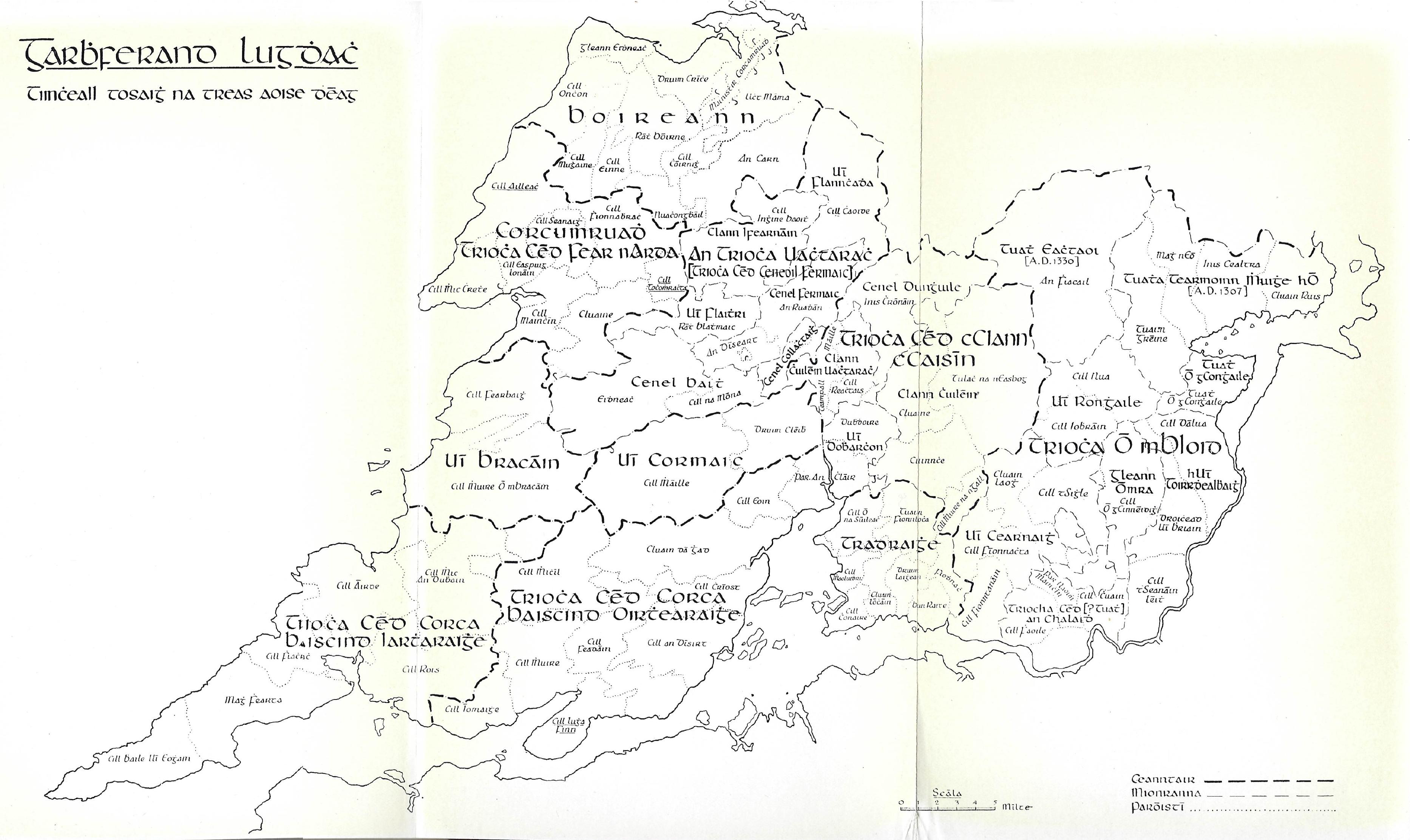
Thomond Tribal Map c. AD 1200, with Uí mBloid, Clann Caisin and Cinéal Fearmaic being the ancient Dál gCais tribal areas

Cas or Tál Cas was the eponymous ancestor and dynastic founder of the Dál gCais (Deisi Tuaiscirt) clan in Gaelic Ireland, from whom all branches of the Dalcassian dynasty claim common descent.

== Life ==
Tál Cas was the son of Conall Eachluath and his wife Coirpthe, daughter of Eochaid Mugmedon. He acquired the nickname Tál (meaning "adze") as he was the foster son of a wright. He became King of Thomond and made a gavel of his territory among his thirteen sons. On his death the kingship of Thomond passed to his eldest son Blait.

== Family ==
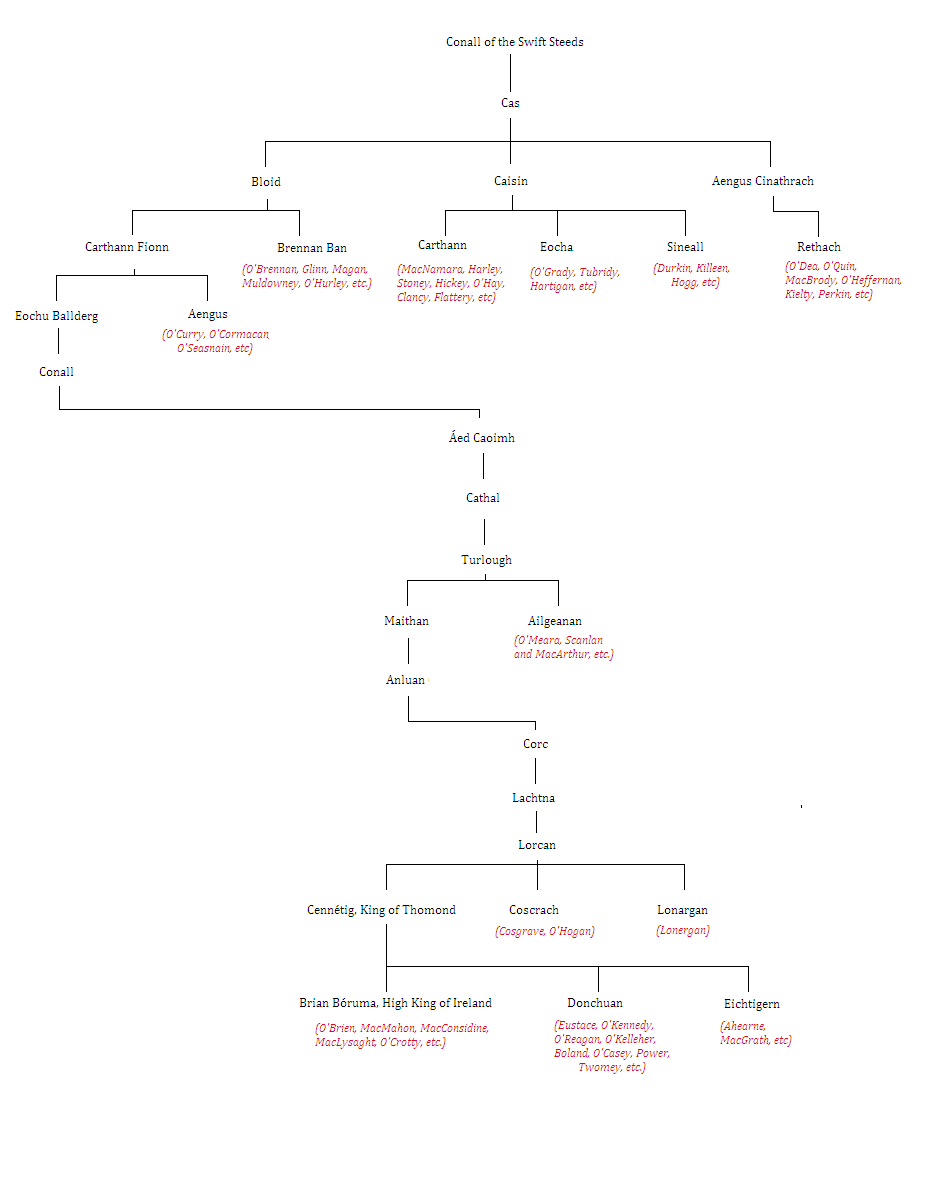
Tree chart showing relationships between the Dalcassian septs

He had thirteen sons, at least three of whom would found substantial lineages whose descendants would rule as lords over substantial territories:

- Blod (Uí Bhloid)
  - Carthann Fionn
    - Oenghus (Uí Óengussa)
      - Uí Ronghaile
      - Uí Chearnaigh
    - Eochaidh Bailldearg
      - Uí Floinn
      - Uí Thoirdhealbhach
        - Ua Briain
        - Ua Cinnéidigh
        - Ua hEachthighearn
- Caisín (Ua Caisin)
  - Eochaidh
    - Cinéal nDúnghaile
  - Sineall
    - Uí Dhobharchon
  - Carthann
    - Clan Cuiléin
      - Eoghan mac Cuiléin
        - Clan Cuiléin Uachtarach
      - Maol Cluiche mac Cuiléin
        - Mac Conmara
        - Ua hAllmharain
        - Ua hArtagain
- Aonghus Ceann-nathrach
  - Cinéal Fermaic
    - Ua Deághaidh
  - Cinéal gCuallachtaigh
    - Ó Gríobhtha
  - Cinéal mBaoi
- Aonghus Ceann-aitinn
  - Clann Ifeamain
  - Clann Neachtain
- Lughaidh/Dealbhaoth
  - na Dealbhna
  - Muinnter Chochláin
- Carthann
  - Dal gCais Leithe Lachtmhuighe
- Aedh
  - Ui Aedha
- Lughaidh Éile
  - Muinnter Dhobharchon
  - Muinnter Chonraoi
  - Muinnter Chearnaigh
  - Muinnter Aonghusa
  - Muinnter Dhubhthaigh
- Séadna
- Cormac
- Caindeach
- Nae
- Loisceann

== Genealogy ==
Surnames purported to be of Dalcassian origin have a statistically significant correlation with the possession of the Y-DNA signature R-L226 and thus this mutation is believed to be associated with their ancestral founder.
