= Lugaid Mend =

Legendary king of Ireland

Lugaid Mend (also Lámderg) was one of the legendary kings of Ireland. He was a son of Óengus Tírech, son of Fer Corb, son of Mug Corb, son of Cormac Cass. He was the grandfather of Cass.

He was contemporaneous with Niall of the Nine Hostages. The clans of In Déis Tuaisceirt considered him their ancestor.

== Life ==
Note: (Note: Quoted areas said to be extracted from the Book of Ballymote)

Lugaid menn (illustrious). “ He it was that first and violently grasped the land of Tuadh-Mumha [i.e. the modern county of Clare]—for which reason it is called Lugaid Red-hand’s rough sword-land, seeing that the countries which the men of Mumha acquired by main force were two, viz., Osraighe in eric for Edirsceol whom the men of Laigen slew, and Tuadh-Mumha in eric for Crimthann, son of Fidach. Howbeit .... according to the legal right of the [old] provincial partition Tuadh-Mumha belongs to the province of Connachta.”*

Now the ostensible reason why Lugaid seized on the land beyond the Sinainn as eric for Crimthann was this :—

Crimthann the Great, of the Eoganachta race, brother-in law of Eochaid Muigmedon, to whom he succeeded in the sovranty of Eire (365) had for sister Mongfionn the Queen, and her vehement desire was that her favourite son Brian should be Ard-ri after Crimthann her brother. To compass her purpose, and to that end, she entertained her brother while on a visit to the province of Connachta, at a banquet, whereat she handed him a poisoned cup of wine:

‘ Received he drink of poison in his house From his sister, from the daughter of Fidach.’

“ I will not drink,” said he, “ until thou first shalt have drunk.” She drank accordingly and Crimthann after her. Mongfionn died on Samhain’s Eve . . . but Crimthann from the north, progressing towards his own country, gained Sliabh-suidhe-in-rig (the mountain of the King’s sitting) near Creatalach beyond the Sinainn, and there he died (A.D. 379).

. . . Howbeit Mongfionn’s treachery and her choice of death for herself, served her purpose not at all, for Niall of the Nine Hostages succeeded Crimthann, and ruled all Eire (379-405).+

Lugaid gained seven battles over the Connachta, killed seven kings, and drove them with only hirelings and boys from Carn Feradaig to Áth Lucait. He guarded his newly acquired territory so well ‘ that not even a leveret escaped northward.’ Thus he made good his claims, and thus was that land annexed to Leth-Mogha, to which half of Eire it nominally had belonged, lying as it did southward of the frontier set up by Conn and Eoghan: but it was not entirely subdued till about the beginning of the fifth century, for Connachta’s kings made many attempts to recover possession of it.

The kingdom of Tuath-Mumha after this conquest extended from the isles of Aran and Sliabh Echtghe on the north to Sliabh Eibhline near Caisel; and from the cliffs of Leim-Conchullainn, eastward to Sliabh-Dala in Osraighe. “ And the Dal-gCais had it free without rent, without taxing from the Kings of Eire.”*

When Lugaid attained in due course the Kingship of Mumha, he invaded Wales and exacted its tribute, and sailing northward carried his forays into Alba, where he was likewise victorious.

== Acts ==
He carried on and finished the invasion of the southern end of Connacht started by King Crimthann mac Fidaig. The war defined the present-day boundary between County Clare and County Galway.

== Sons ==
- Conall Eachluath (succeeded his father)
- Loisceann
