= List of historical monuments in Ireland =

List of historical monuments in Ireland may refer to:

- List of castles in Ireland
- List of historic houses in the Republic of Ireland
- List of megalithic monuments in Ireland
- List of monastic houses in Ireland
- List of National Monuments of Ireland
- List of World Heritage Sites in the Republic of Ireland
