= Heapstown Cairn =

- Carn Ochtriallach (Irish)
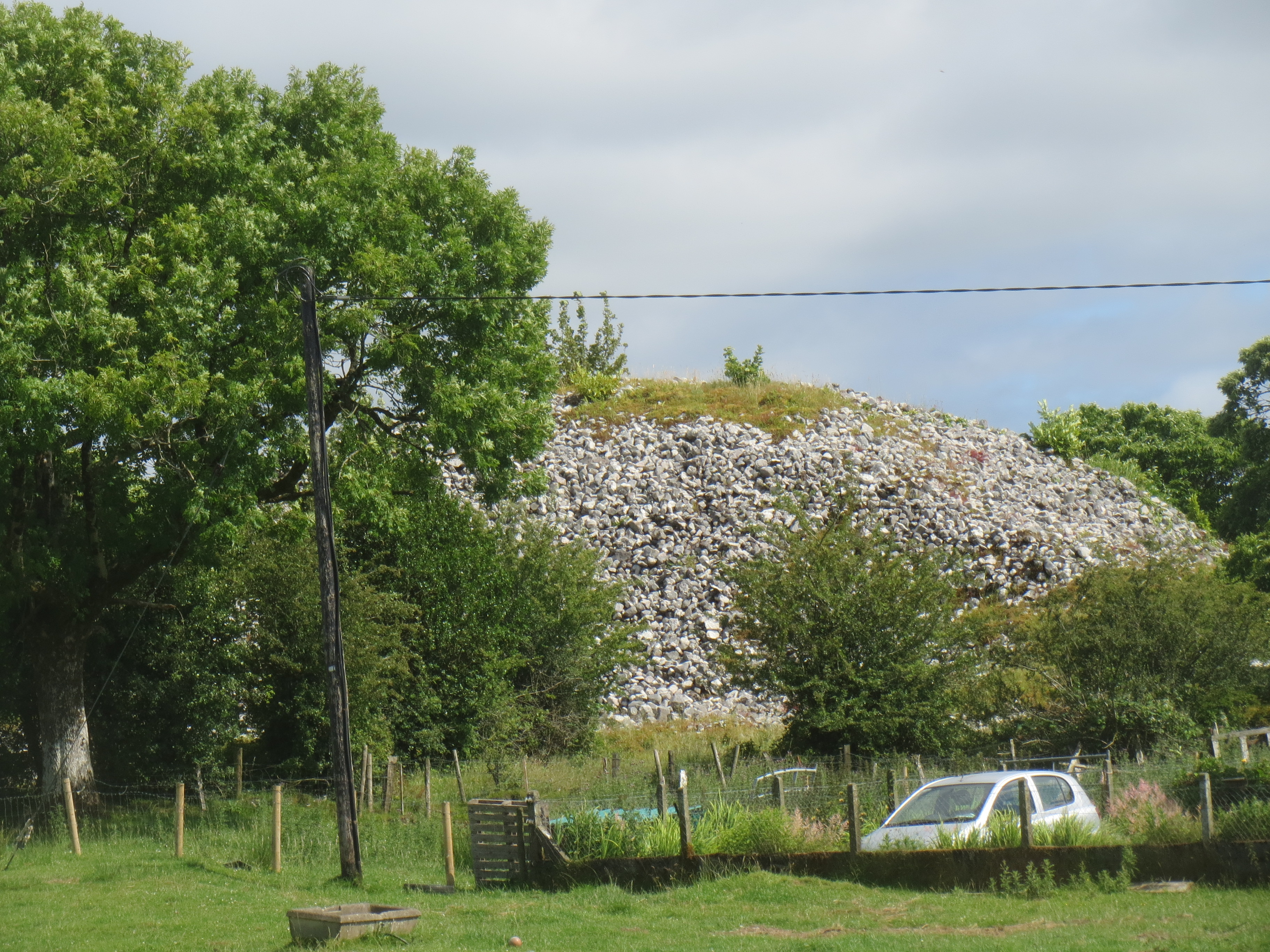
- Heapstown Cairn

- Location within Ireland
- 54.095000°N 8.348333°W
- Type: cairn
- Location: Heapstown, Castlebaldwin, County Sligo, Ireland

History
- Built: c. 3000 BC

Site notes
- Elevation: 65 m (213 ft)
- Height: 6 m (20 ft)

National monument of Ireland
- Official name: Heapstown
- Reference no.: 152

Heapstown Cairn (Irish: Carn Ochtriallach) is a large ancient cairn and protected National Monument in County Sligo, Ireland. It was built in the Neolithic, around 3000 BC, and is believed to cover a passage tomb. The cairn is one of the largest in Ireland and is near Carrowkeel Megalithic Cemetery.

== Location ==
Heapstown Cairn is located on a low hill immediately west of the River Unshin and north of Lough Arrow, 2.1 km (1.3 mi) northwest of Ballindoon Friary. It is in the townland of Heapstown, which is an English translation of the Irish name Baile an Chairn, meaning "townland of the cairn or heap". It was formerly anglicized Ballincarn.

== History and myth ==
Heapstown Cairn is thought to have been built c. 3000 BC, during the Neolithic era, and is believed to enclose a passage grave like those at the Carrowkeel Megalithic Cemetery, 5 km (3.1 mi) SSE of Heapstown.

One account of the cairn's construction is given in the medieval tale of the Second Battle of Moytura. Dian Cecht, healer of the divine Tuatha Dé Danann, puts healing herbs into the Well of Sláine, and the Tuatha Dé Danann drink from it. The Fomorians, on a suggestion from the warrior Ochtriallach, fill the well with stones to keep their enemies from using it. Thus it is known as Carn Ochtriallach "Ochtriallach's cairn". In another medieval tale, it was the burial mound of prince Ailill mac Echach Mugmedóin, brother of Niall of the Nine Hostages.

In 1837, when it was illustrated by George Petrie, it stood to its full height and had a standing stone on top. However, much of the stone was removed for road-building by the time it was illustrated by William Wakeman in 1878.

== Description ==
The cairn is about 60 m (200 ft) wide and about 6 m (20 ft) high, and is composed of locally quarried chunks of limestone mixed with blocks of red sandstone. There is a kerb of huge limestone blocks around the edge of the cairn. The monument has been extensively quarried on all sides except the southeast, which probably contains an undiscovered passage grave beneath the cairn. Passage grave-style megalithic art was found on a south-facing kerbstone in 1998. Heapstown Cairn is similar to Miosgán Meadhbha (Maeve's Cairn), also in County Sligo.
