= Lough Arrow =

Lake in northwest of Ireland

- Loch Arbhach (Irish)
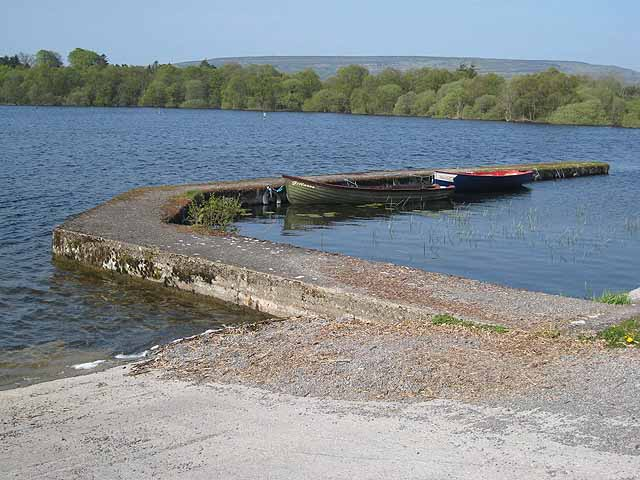
- Toward the Bricklieve Mountains

- Location in Ireland
- Location: County Sligo, County Roscommon
- Coordinates: 54°3′12″N 8°19′15″W
- Lake type: mesotrophic
- Primary inflows: Mainly spring-fed, also some streams
- Primary outflows: Unshin River
- Catchment area: 65.76 km^{2} (25 sq mi)
- Basin countries: Ireland
- Max. length: 6 km (3.7 mi)
- Max. width: 2 km (1.2 mi)
- Surface area: 12.47 km^{2} (4.81 sq mi)
- Average depth: 9 m (30 ft)
- Max. depth: 33 m (108 ft)
- Surface elevation: 53 m (174 ft)
- Islands: 4

Lough Arrow (Irish: Loch Arbhach) is a freshwater lake in the northwest of Ireland. This large, scenic lake covers an area of 12.47 square kilometres (4.8 sq mi) and lies mostly in County Sligo with a smaller part in County Roscommon. It is a popular trout fishing lake.

== Geography ==
Lough Arrow lies mostly in south County Sligo about 24 kilometres (15 mi) southeast of Sligo and 6 km (4 mi) northwest of Boyle. The Bricklieve Mountains rise west of the lake.

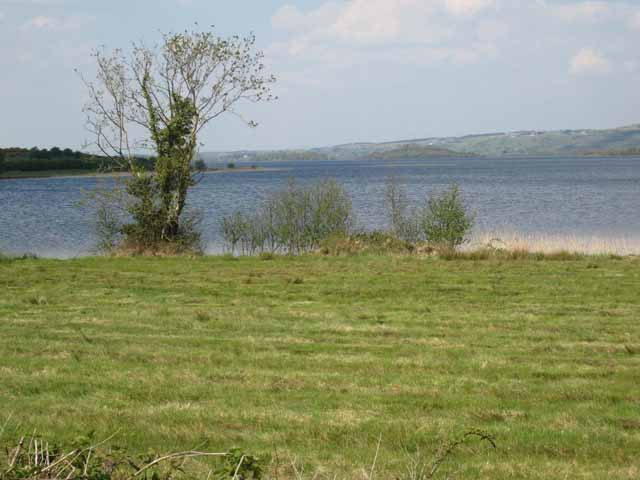
Looking towards Inishmore island

Lough Arrow is about 6 km (3.7 mi) long from north to south and 2 km (1.2 mi) wide. The lake has four islands: Annaghgowla, Inishmore, Inishbeg and Muck.

== Hydrology ==
Lough Arrow is a mesotrophic lake. It is fed mainly by springs but also by a number of streams entering on the lake's western and southern sides. The lake drains north into the Unshin River. The mean lake depth is 9 m (30 ft) with a maximum depth of 33 m (108 ft).

== Natural history ==
Fish present in Lough Arrow include brown trout, perch, roach, three-spined stickleback, pike, rudd, bream and the critically endangered European eel. A number of duck species winter at the lake including mallard, wigeon, teal, red-breasted merganser, tufted duck, pochard and goldeneye. Other bird species found at the lake include great crested grebe, little grebe, cormorant and mute swan.

Lough Arrow has been designated a Special Area of Conservation as a hard water lake habitat.

== History ==
A number of important historical sites are located in the area around Lough Arrow. Carrowkeel Megalithic Cemetery is located in the Bricklieve Mountains above the lake's western side. It is one of the most extensive and best preserved complexes of the Irish passage tomb tradition. Moytirra East Court Tomb, located on the eastern side of the lake, features standing stones and is also the site of the mythological Second Battle of Moytura. Just north of Lough Arrow is the 10 meter high Heapstown Cairn constructed c. 3000 BC.

== See also ==
- List of loughs in Ireland
- List of Special Areas of Conservation in the Republic of Ireland
