= List of World Heritage Sites in Ireland =

Location of the two World Heritage Sites within the Republic of Ireland. Map does not show the two World Heritage Sites in Northern Ireland.

The United Nations Educational, Scientific and Cultural Organization (UNESCO) World Heritage Properties are places of importance to cultural or natural heritage as described in the UNESCO World Heritage Convention, established in 1972. Cultural heritage consists of monuments (such as architectural works, monumental sculptures, or inscriptions), groups of buildings, and sites (including archaeological sites). Natural heritage consists of natural features (physical and biological formations), geological and physiographical formations (including habitats of threatened species of animals and plants), and natural sites which are important from the point of view of science, conservation, or natural beauty. The Republic of Ireland ratified the convention on 16 September 1991.

As of 2025, the Republic of Ireland has two sites on the list, and a further four on the tentative list. The first site listed was Brú na Bóinne – Archaeological Ensemble of the Bend of the Boyne, in 1993. The second site, Sceilg Mhichíl, was listed in 1996. Both are cultural sites, as determined by the organisation's selection criteria.

There are two other UNESCO World Heritage Sites in Ireland, both of these being in Northern Ireland. They are the Giant's Causeway and Gracehill Moravian Settlement, both in County Antrim.

== World Heritage Sites ==
UNESCO lists sites under ten criteria; each entry must meet at least one of the criteria. Criteria i through vi are cultural, and vii through x are natural.

Site	Image	Location (county)	Year listed	UNESCO data	Description
Brú na Bóinne – Archaeological Ensemble of the Bend of the Boyne	A monumental stone structure in the middle of the field	Meath	1993	659; i, iii, iv (cultural)	The site is a complex of Neolithic chamber tombs, standing stones, henges and other prehistoric enclosures, some dating from as early as 35th century BC – 32nd century BC. The site was built with sophistication and a knowledge of science and astronomy, which is most evident in the passage grave of Newgrange (pictured). It represents the largest concentration of prehistoric megalithic art in Europe.
Sceilg Mhichíl	Skellig Michael, a rocky islet in the sea	Kerry	1996	757; iii, iv (cultural)	The Celtic monastery, which is situated almost at the summit of a pyramidal rocky island, was probably founded in the 7th century. For 600 years, it was a centre of monastic life for Irish Christian monks. Due to the extreme remoteness, it has until recently discouraged visitors, thus the site is exceptionally well preserved. The very spartan conditions inside the monastery illustrate the ascetic lifestyle practised by early Irish Christians. The monks lived in stone 'beehive' huts (clocháns), perched above nearly vertical cliff walls.

== Tentative list ==
In addition to sites inscribed on the World Heritage List, member states can maintain a list of tentative sites that they may consider for nomination. Nominations for the World Heritage List are only accepted if the site was previously listed on the Tentative List. As of 2025, the Republic of Ireland has four sites on its tentative list.

* Transnational site

Tentative Sites
Site	Image	Location	Year listed	UNESCO criteria	Description
The Royal Sites of Ireland: Cashel, Dún Ailinne, Hill of Uisneach, Rathcroghan Complex, and Tara Complex	Castle ruins on a hill	several sites	2010	iii, iv, vi (cultural)	This nomination comprises properties that served as sites for major royal inauguration, ceremony, and assembly. They represent Irish provinces with the Hill of Uisneach being the place where provinces meet. Navan Fort, which is in County Armagh in Northern Ireland, can also be viewed as a royal site in this context. The sites have monuments ranging from the Neolithic, Bronze, and Iron Age, to early Christian period. The Rock of Cashel is pictured.
The Passage Tomb Landscape of County Sligo	Sun at peak of Queen Maeve's Tomb	Sligo	2023	iii, iv (cultural)	The Passage Tomb Landscape of County Sligo can be visualised as a northern coastal group of passage tombs centred on the Carrowmore complex and the Cúil Iorra peninsula, and a southern inland group in the Bricklieve Mountains, anchored by the Carrowkeel complex, both areas containing dense concentrations of monuments. These two foci, 23 km (14 mi) apart, are geographically connected by the Unshin River, but also by an intimate and dynamic interaction between landscape, ritual and ancestral connections.
Transatlantic Cable Ensemble*	Valentia Island Cable Station and residences	Kerry	2023	ii, iv (cultural)	This nomination comprises the two termini of the world's first permanent transatlantic telegraph cable, which revolutionized the long-distance communication. The eastern terminus, the Valentia Transatlantic Cable Station (pictured) in Ireland, was built in 1868, while the western terminus, the Heart's Content Cable Station, was finished in 1876. The sites were closed in the 1960s but still preserve a lot of intact original equipment.
The Historic Astronomical Observatories of Ireland*	A white observatory building	Dublin and Offaly	2025	ii, iv, vi	This nomination consists of three well-preserved historic observatories of Ireland. These complexes reflect global developments in telescope and observatory design of the 18th and 19th centuries. In the Republic of Ireland, the Birr Castle Demesne and the Dunsink Observatory (pictured) are nominated, with the other planned component being the Armagh Observatory in Northern Ireland.
