= Ailill mac Echach Mugmedóin =

Ailill mac Echach Mugmedóin was an Irish prince, the son of the high king Eochaid Mugmedón (d.362) by his wife Mongfind, sister of Crimthann mac Fidaig (d.367). He was ancestor of the Uí nAilello dynasty of Connacht. He lived in the late 4th century.

"The Violent Death of Crimthann mac Fidaig and of the Three Sons of Eochaid Muigmedón" gives the story of the sons of Eochaid Mugmedón. According to this saga, his half-brother the high king Niall Noigiallach (d.405) made Ailill's full brother Fiachrae his champion and levier of rents and hostages on the death of their brother Brion. Ailill accompanied Fiachrae on a successful raid into Munster but Fiachrae was mortally wounded. After Fiachrae's death, Ailill was captured and executed by Eochaid mac Crimthainn of Munster. According to legend, he was buried at Heapstown Cairn, County Sligo.
