= Crimthann =

Crimthann, Cremthann or in Modern Irish Criofan, is a masculine Irish given name meaning fox. Notable people with the name include:

- Crimthann mac Fidaig, legendary High King of Ireland of the 4th century AD
- Crimthann Nia Náir, legendary High King of Ireland of the 1st century AD
- Crimthann Coscrach, legendary High King of Ireland of the 3rd century BC
- Crimthann mac Énnai, 5th century AD King of Leinster
- Crimthann mac Áedo, 7th century AD King of Leinster
- Crimthann Srem mac Echado, 6th century AD King of Munster

== See also ==
- List of Irish-language given names
