= Eochaid Mugmedon =

Legendary Irish king

Eochaid Mugmedón (Old Irish: [ˈeu̯xəðʲ ˈmuɣβʲəðoːn]) was a legendary Irish king. According to medieval Irish legend and historical tradition, Eochaid was a High King of Ireland, best known as the father of Niall of the Nine Hostages and ancestor of the Uí Néill and Connachta dynasties. He is not mentioned in the list of kings of Tara in the Baile Chuind (The Ecstasy of Conn), but is included in the synthetic lists of High Kings in the Lebor Gabála Érenn, the Irish annals, Geoffrey Keating's history, and the Laud Synchronisms.

According to the Lebor Gabála Érenn and its derivative works, Eochaid was the son of the former High King Muiredach Tírech, a descendant of Conn Cétchathach. Muiredach was overthrown and killed by Cáelbad son of Cronn Bradruí, an Ulster king, but Cáelbad only ruled one year before Eochaid killed him and took the throne. The Lebor Gabála says he extracted the bórama or cow tribute from Leinster without a battle. However, Keating records that he was defeated in the Battle of Cruachan Claonta by the Leinster king Énnae Cennsalach.

According to the saga "The Adventures of the Sons of Eochaid Mugmedon", he is said to have had two wives: Mongfind, daughter of Fidach, who bore him four sons, Brion, Ailill, Fiachrae and Fergus; and Cairenn Chasdub, daughter of Sachell Balb, king of the Saxons, who bore him his most famous son, Niall. Mongfind is said to have hated Cairenn, and forced her to expose her child, but the baby was rescued and raised by a poet called Torna. When Niall grew up he returned to Tara and rescued his mother from the servitude Mongfind had placed her under. Mongfind appears to have originally been a supernatural personage: the saga "The Death of Crimthann mac Fidaig" says the festival of Samhain was commonly called the "Festival of Mongfind", and prayers were offered to her on Samhain eve. Although it is probably anachronistic for Eochaid to have had a Saxon wife, T. F. O'Rahilly argues that the name Cairenn is derived from the Latin name Carina, and that it is plausible that she might have been a Romano-Briton. Indeed, Keating describes her not as a Saxon but as the "daughter of the king of Britain".

After ruling for seven or eight years, Eochaid died of an illness at Tara, and was succeeded by Mongfind's brother Crimthann mac Fidaig, king of Munster. Keating dates his reign to 344–351, the Annals of the Four Masters to 357–365. Daniel P. McCarthy, based on the Irish annals, dates his death to 362.

Preceded by Cáelbad	High King of Ireland; AFM 357–365; FFE 344–351	Succeeded by Crimthann mac Fidaig

== The Connachta ==
Conn Cétchathach
Art
Cormac
Cairbre Lifechair
Fiachu Sraibtine
Muiredach Tirech
Mongfind	Eochaid; Mugmedon	Cairenn
Brión	Fiachrae	Ailill	Niall Noígíallach
(The Connachta)
Conall Gulban (Cenél Conaill)	Endae	Eógan (Cenél nEógan)	Coirpre	Lóegaire	Maine	Conall Cremthainne	Fiachu
Muirdeach	Cormac Cáech	Lugaid (d. 507)	Fergus Cerrbél	Ardgal (d. 520) (Cenél nArdgail)
Muirchertach mac Ercae (d. 536)	Túathal Máelgarb	Diarmait
Colmán Már (Clann Cholmáin)	Áed Sláine (Síl nÁedo Sláine)
Northern Uí Néill	Southern Uí Néill
