= Carrowkeel Megalithic Cemetery =

Cluster of tombs in County Sligo, Ireland

Coordinates: 54°03′12″N 8°22′40″W

Carrowkeel Tombs
- Tuamaí na Ceathrún Caoile (Irish)
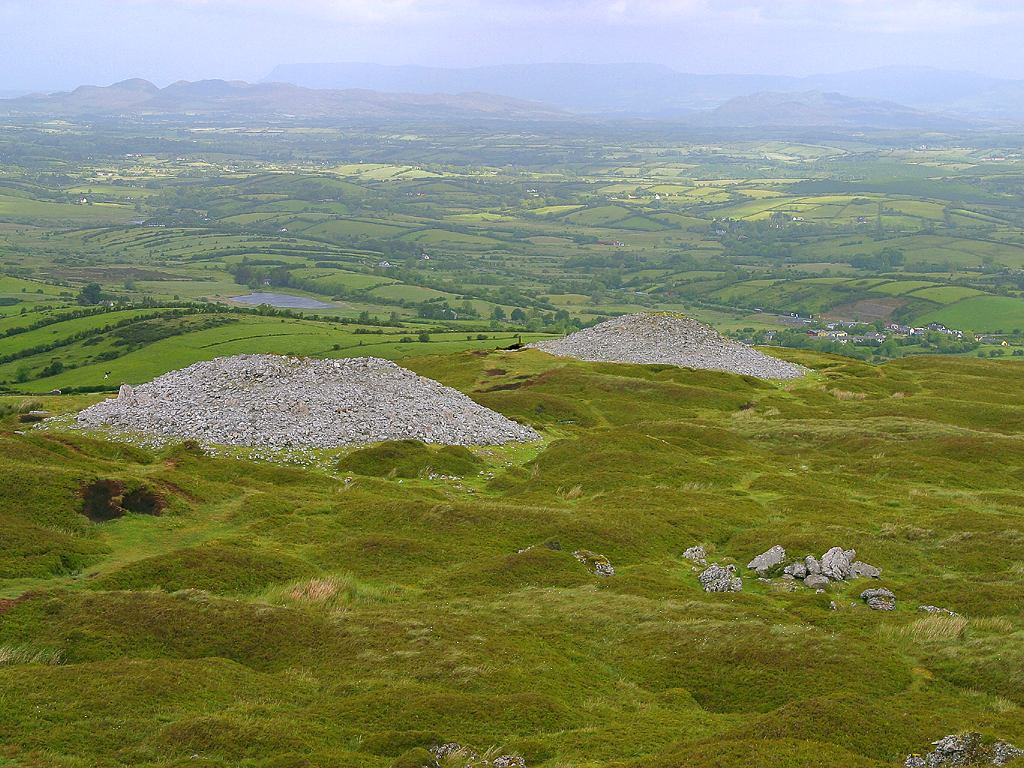
- Two of the tombs at Carrowkeel.

- Location within island of Ireland
- Type: passage tomb complex
- Periods: Neolithic
- Location: County Sligo, Ireland

History
- Built: c. 3500 BC - 2900 BC

Site notes
- Area: 2 km^{2} (0.77 sq mi)

National monument of Ireland
- Official name: Carrowkeel Passage Tomb Cemetery
- Reference no.: 518

Carrowkeel is a cluster of passage tombs in south County Sligo, Ireland. They were built in the 4th millennium BC, during the Neolithic era. The monuments are on the Bricklieve Hills (An Bricshliabh, 'the speckled hills'), overlooking Lough Arrow, and are sometimes called the Bricklieve tombs. They are named after the townland of Carrowkeel in which most of them are located. Nearby are the Caves of Kesh and Heapstown Cairn. The Carrowkeel tombs are protected National Monuments and are considered one of the "big four" passage tomb cemeteries in Ireland, along with Carrowmore, Brú na Bóinne and Loughcrew.

== History and research ==
The monuments at Carrowkeel were originally excavated in 1911 by a team led by R.A.S. Macalister, accompanied by Robert Lloyd Praeger and Edmund Clarence Richard Armstrong. These excavations led to an array of findings including animal bones, cremated human remains, human bones, and tools and pottery from the Neolithic Age. The particular type of crude pottery found in the Irish passage tombs is called Carrowkeel Ware, having first been recorded in the Carrowkeel Monuments. Some pottery has also been identified from the Bronze Age. Some of the artefacts recovered are stored in the National Museum of Ireland, but most of the bone assemblage was transported to Cambridge University, where Macalister's father, Alexander, was a Professor.

Praeger recorded an eerie account of the first entry into one of the Carrowkeel monuments in his 1937 memoir The Way That I Went:

I lit three candles and stood awhile, to let my eyes accustom themselves to the dim light. There was everything, just as the last Bronze Age man (sic) had left it, three to four thousand years before. A light brownish dust covered all... There beads of stone, bone implements made from Red Deer antlers, and many fragments of much decayed pottery. On little raised recesses in the wall were flat stones, on which reposed the calcinated bones of young children.

The bones curated in Cambridge at the Leverhulme Centre for Human Evolutionary Studies were researched by the Human Population Dynamics at Carrowkeel Project. The original excavation mistakenly dated the monuments as Bronze Age structures, but the new study has shown that the sites were in use between c. 3,500 and 2,500 Cal. BC. Of 22 stable isotope samples, the majority indicated that the dead had grown up in a carboniferous limestone region, probably close to Carrowkeel. The DNA genomes assembled from six individuals indicated ancestral origins in Anatolia, and greater affinity with the Mediterranean than the Danubian expansion of early farming in Europe.

Carrowkeel is set on high ground above Lough Arrow in the Bricklieve Mountains. There are fourteen passage tombs in the central core of the complex at Carrowkeel; some can be entered by crawling through a narrow passage. The entrances and passages of the monuments are often oriented northwest, towards the area of Cúil Irra, Knocknarea and Carrowmore. Twelve more passage tombs are located within a radius of 6 km, sometimes at elevated locations such as the Keshcorran group, or Suigh Lughaidh. One of these outliers is situated at the north end of Lough Arrow and NW Carrowkeel; the giant passage tomb, Heapstown Cairn. This is part of the legendary Moytura, a site of battles between the Tuatha Dé Danann, the ancient gods of Ireland, and the demonic Fomorians.

== Conservation ==
The monuments are under threat from visitors climbing on them, scratching names on them, and taking stones as keepsakes. The tombs are in danger of collapse, and graffiti can damage ancient megalithic art which is not easy to see. There is evidence of recent treasure hunting at some tombs, apparently by people unaware that these "stone age sites are over 5,000 years old and pre-date the use of metals in Ireland". It is illegal to be in possession of metal detectors at historic monuments or to dig for objects. Irish folklore holds that it is bad luck to damage or disrespect such tombs and that doing so could bring a curse. The Office of Public Works is preparing a program of works for the preservation and protection of Carrowkeel.

== Gallery ==
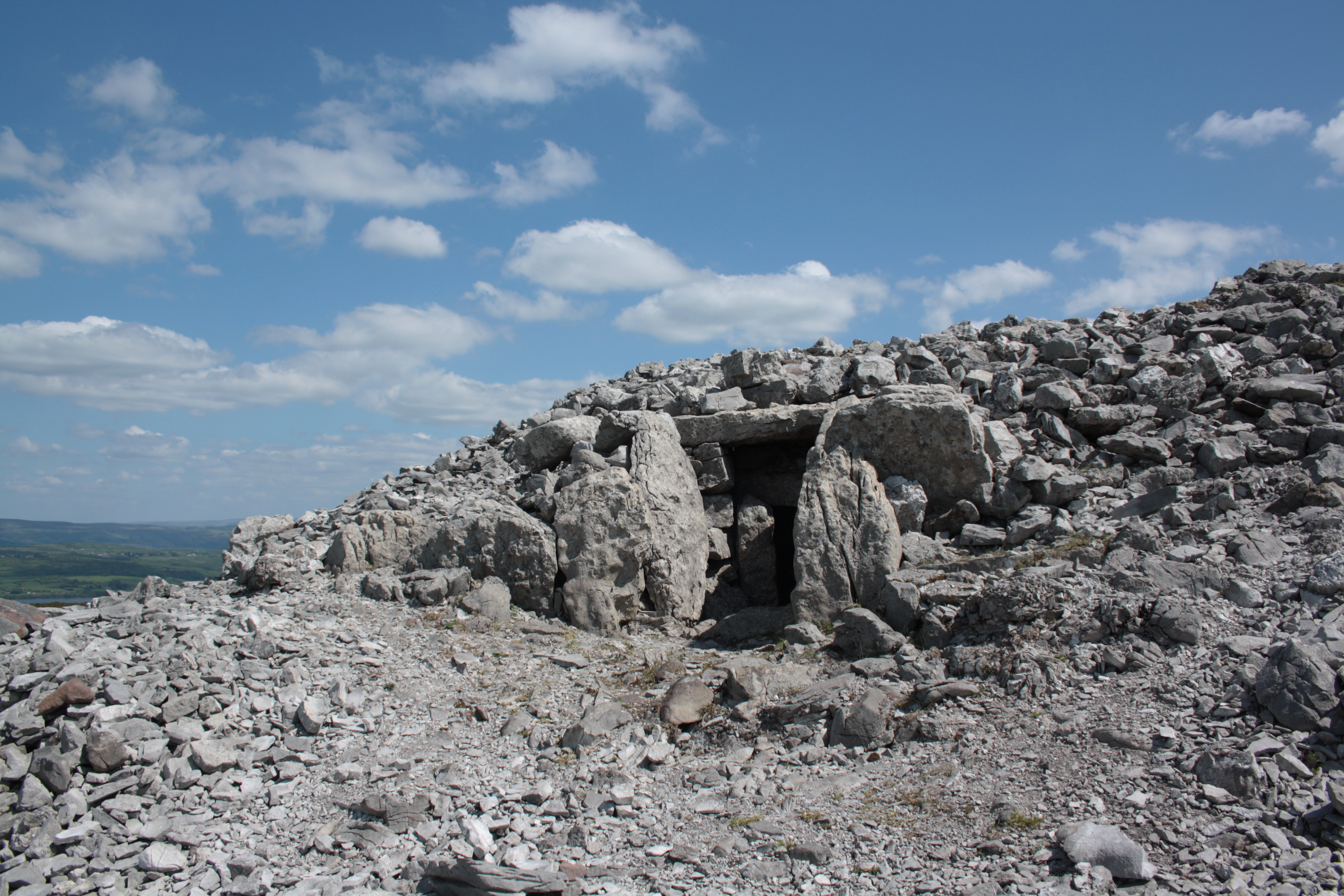

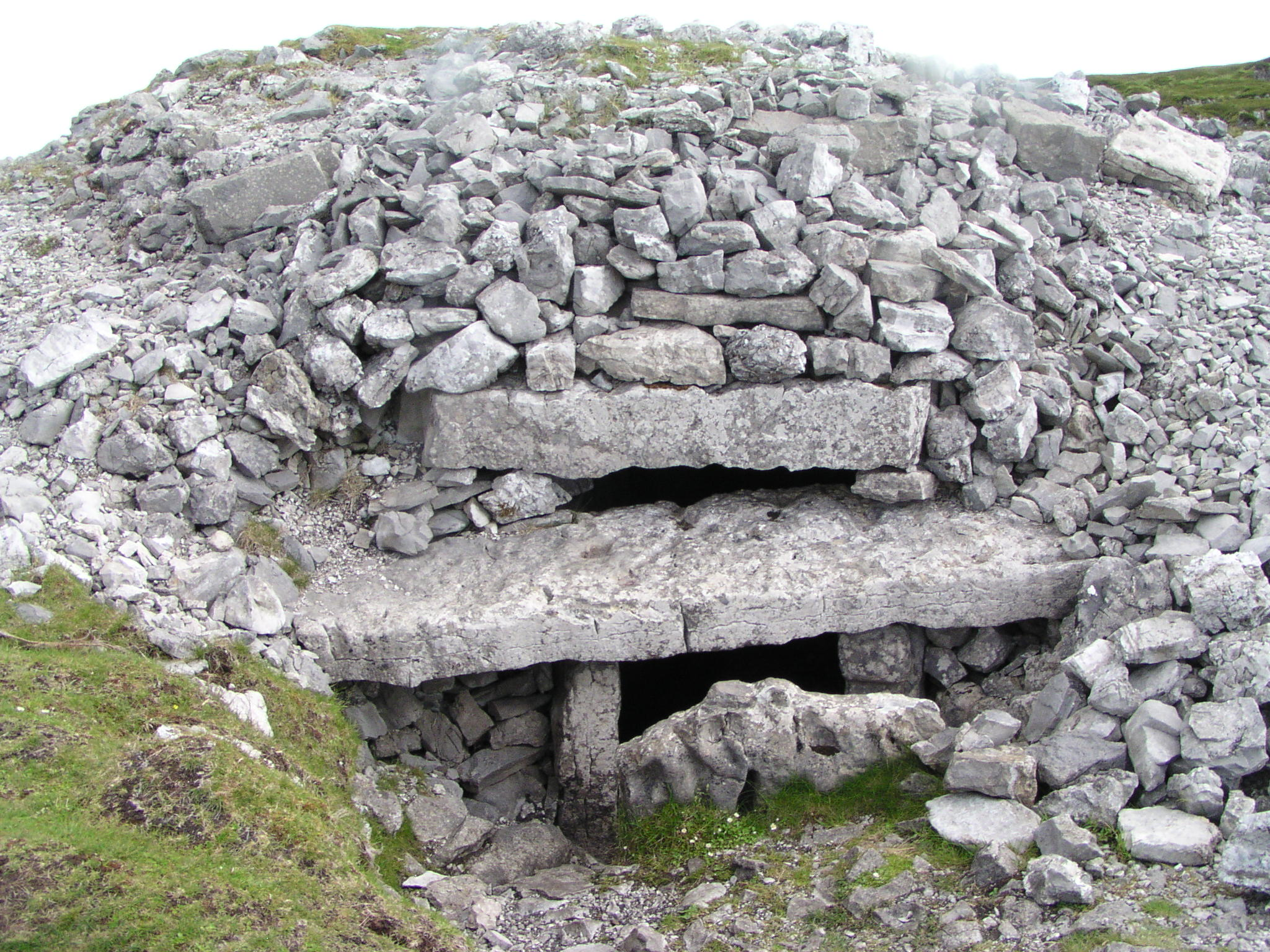

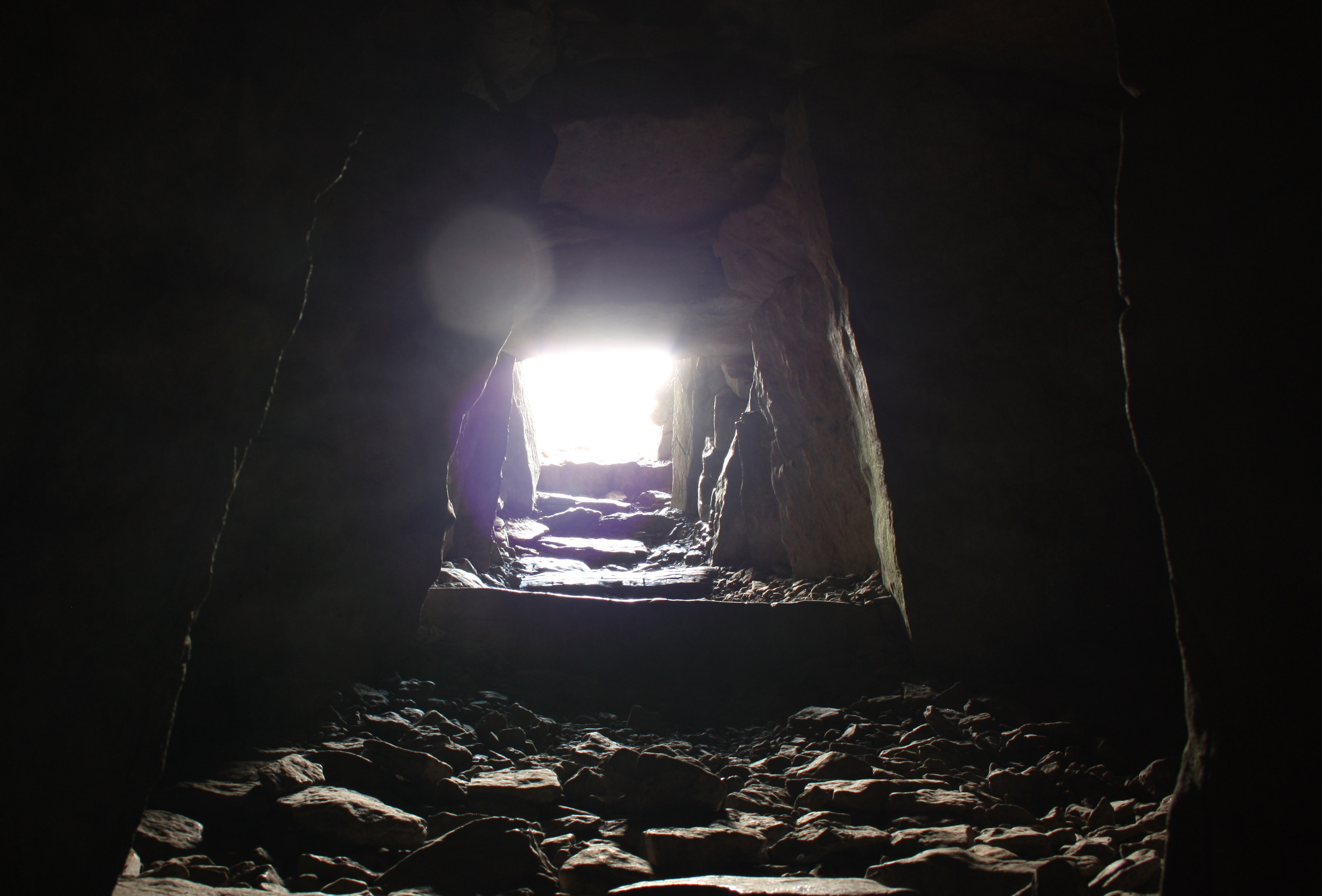

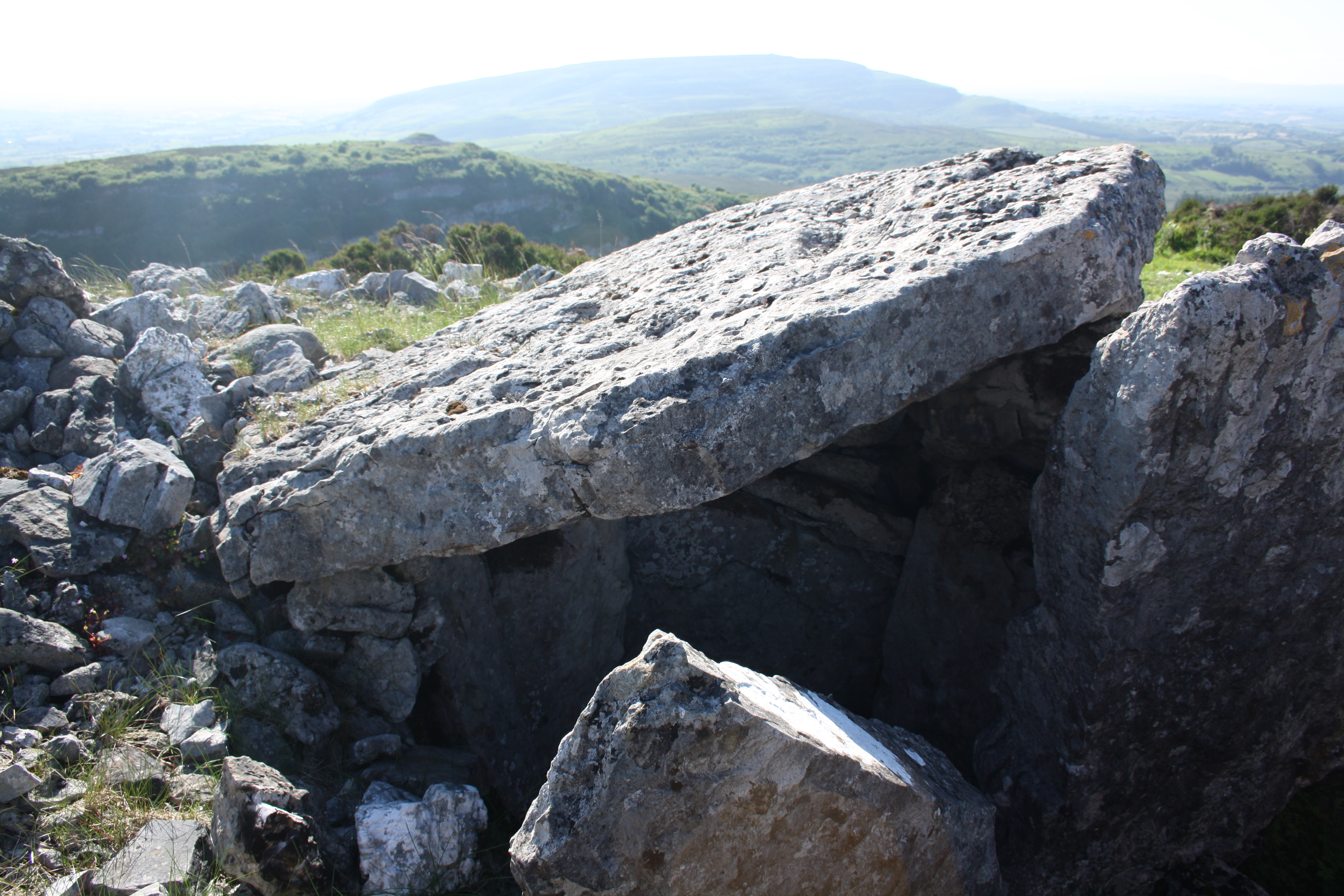
