= Moytirra East Court Tomb =

- Tuama Cúirte Mhaigh Tuireadh Thoir (Irish)
- Giant's Grave
- Location in Ireland
- 54.076009°N 8.283392°W
- Type: court cairn
- Location: Moytirra East, Kilmactranny, County Sligo, Ireland

History
- Built: c. 4000–2500 BC

Site notes
- Elevation: 147 m (482 ft)

National monument of Ireland
- Official name: Moytirra East
- Reference no.: 465

Moytirra East Court Tomb, commonly called the Giant's Grave, is a court cairn and National Monument located in County Sligo, Ireland.

== Location ==
Moytirra East court tomb is located 5 km (3.1 mi) west of Ballyfarnon, to the east of Lough Arrow.

== History ==
Moytirra East Court Tomb was built c. 4000–2500 BC, in the Neolithic.

It was locally known as the Giant's Grave, and was said to hold the remains of a giant killed in the Battle of Moytura.

== Description ==
Moytirra East Court Tomb has the remains of a U-shaped court leading to a four-chamber gallery. These would have been covered by a cairn, but these stones seem to have been removed.
