= Cairenn =

Cairenn Chasdub; Caireann ("curly-black (hair)") was, according to medieval Irish legend and historical tradition, the daughter of Sachell Balb, king of the Saxons, the second wife of the Irish High King Eochaid Mugmedón, and the mother of Niall of the Nine Hostages.

When she was pregnant with Niall, Eochaid's first wife Mongfind was jealous and made her do heavy labour, hoping to make her miscarry. She gave birth beside a well as she was drawing water, and, out of fear of Mongfind, left the baby exposed to the birds. But the child was rescued and brought up by a poet called Torna. When the child, Niall, grew up he returned to Tara and relieved his mother of her labour, and went on to become High King himself.

Given Niall's dates (he is traditionally supposed to have died around the turn of the 5th century, although modern historians place him half a century later), it is anachronistic for his mother to have been a Saxon, but O'Rahilly argues that the name Cairenn is derived from the Latin name Carina, and that it is plausible that she might have been a Romano-Briton. Indeed, Geoffrey Keating describes her not as a Saxon but as the "daughter of the king of Britain".
