= Ardgal mac Conaill =

Ardgal mac Conaill (died 520) was a King of Uisnech in Mide of the Ui Neill dynasty. He was the son of Conall Cremthainne (died 480) and grandson of Niall Noígíallach. He is considered the third king of Uisnech in the list in the Book of Leinster.

Ardgal was slain in the Battle of Detna in Druimne Breg by Colgu, King of the Airthir of Airgialla and the high king Muirchertach mac Muiredaig (died 532) on the Louth-Meath border which points to the origins of the family of Diarmait mac Cerbaill in the territory north of the Boyne and Blackwater.

Ardgal's descendants were known as the Cenél nArdgail. They were situated among the Luigne in Co.Meath.

== See also ==
- Kings of Uisnech
