= Hartigan =

Hartigan is a surname. Notable people with the surname include:

- Bernie Hartigan (b. 1944), Irish hurler
- Bill Hartigan (b. 1934), Australian politician
- Brent Hartigan (b. 1985), Australian football player
- Chad Hartigan (b. 1982), Cyprus-born, Irish-American filmmaker and actor
- Charles Conway Hartigan (1882–1944), American Medal of Honor recipient
- David James Hartigan (1887–1952), Canadian politician
- Gerald Hartigan (1884–1955), South African cricketer
- Grace Hartigan (1922–2008), American painter
- Henry Hartigan (1826–1886), Irish Victoria Cross recipient
- Joan Hartigan (1912–2000), Australian tennis player
- John Hartigan, fictional character
- John Patrick Hartigan (1887–1968), American jurist
- John Hartigan (media executive) (born 1947), Australian journalist and media executive
- John Hartigan (rowing) (1940–2020), American coxswain
- Mark Hartigan (b. 1977), Canadian ice hockey player
- Mercy Hartigan, fictional character
- Neil Hartigan (b. 1938), American politician
- Pamela Hartigan (1948–2016), businesswoman (Note: Born of diplomatic parents and raised in Latin America)
- Pat Hartigan (b. 1950), Irish hurler
- Pat Hartigan (actor) (1881–1951), American actor and director
- Patrick Joseph Hartigan (1878–1952), Australian priest, author and poet
- Roger Hartigan (1879–1958), Australian cricketer
