= Bricklieve Mountains =

Range of hills in Ireland

Coordinates: 54°03′N 8°22′W

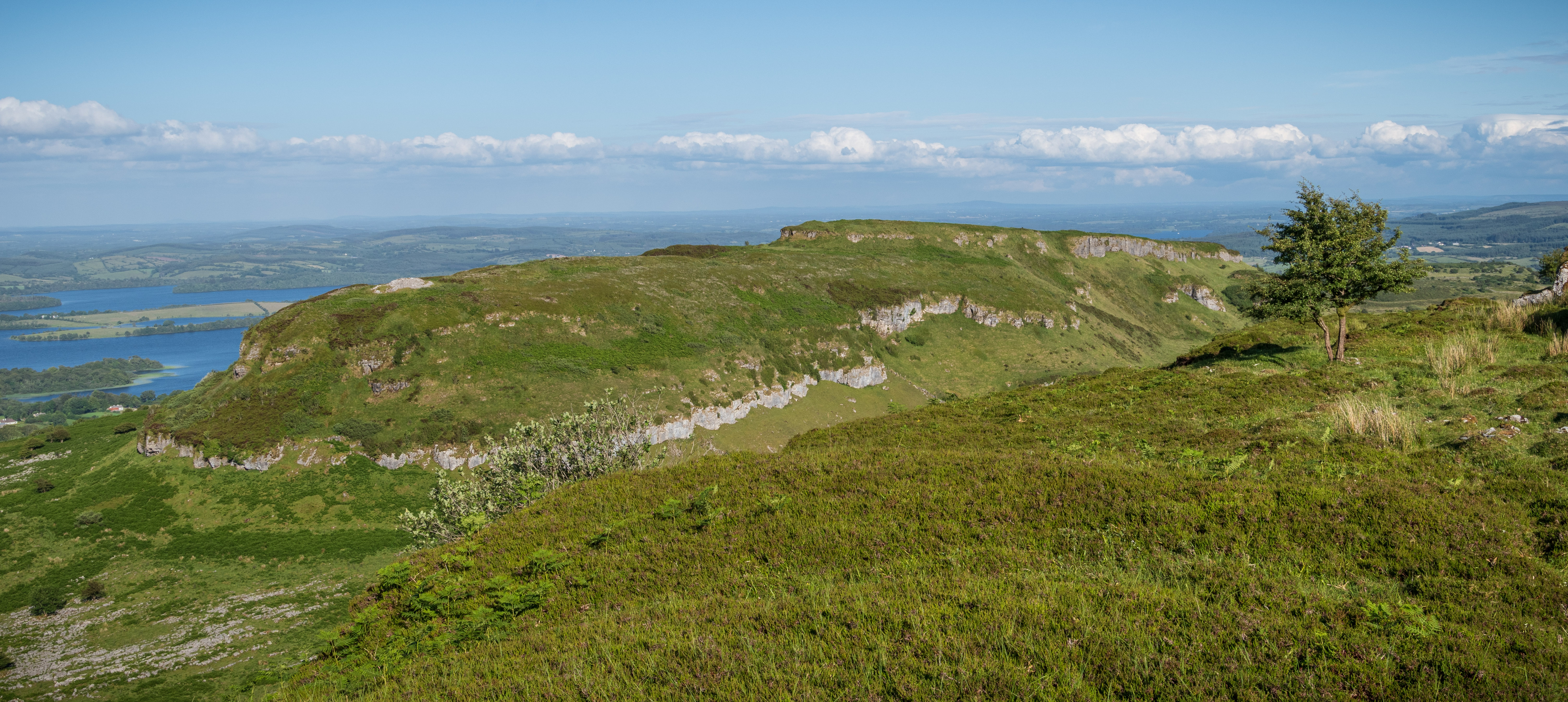
One of the Bricklieve Hills, looking east

The Bricklieve Mountains or Bricklieve Hills (Irish: An Bricshliabh, meaning 'the speckled mountains') are a range of hills in south County Sligo, Ireland. They are dotted with ancient passage tombs known as the Carrowkeel tombs or Bricklieve tombs. The name of the hills is a possible reference to their appearance when more quartz rock survived outside the cairns, making them sparkle in the sun. The hills cover an area of 25 square kilometres (9.7 sq mi) and include only two major hills, Carrowkeel at 321 metres (1,053 ft), and Kesh Corann at 359 metres (1,178 ft). The Caves of Kesh are on the west side of Kesh Corran.
