= Crimthann mac Fidaig =

Crimthann Mór, son of Fidach /ˈkriːvən ˈmɔːr mæk ˈfiːaɪ/, also written Crimthand Mór, was a semi-mythological king of Munster and High King of Ireland of the 4th century. He gained territory in Britain and Gaul but died poisoned by his sister Mongfind. This Crimthann is to be distinguished from two previous High Kings of Ireland of the same name, two Kings of Leinster, and another King of Munster, among others. Importantly, he is included in the Baile Chuinn Chétchathaig (summary), and is thus the last High King of Ireland from Munster until Brian Bóruma, over six hundred years later.

In addition to having his reign described by Geoffrey Keating and mentioned in the Annals of the Four Masters, Crimthand Mór mac Fidaig also plays a major role in many stories belonging to the Cycles of the Kings. In these, he is typically succeeded by Niall of the Nine Hostages as High King of Ireland and by Conall Corc as King of Munster, while his sister Mongfind, the first wife of Eochaid Mugmedón, becomes the ancestor of the Three Connachta. Thus this otherwise obscure kindred is central in the mythologies of most of the great medieval Irish dynasties.

According to Geoffrey Keating, Fidheang, daughter of an unnamed king of Connacht, was the wife of Crimthand Mór. She is not mentioned in other sources.

== Dind Traduí ==
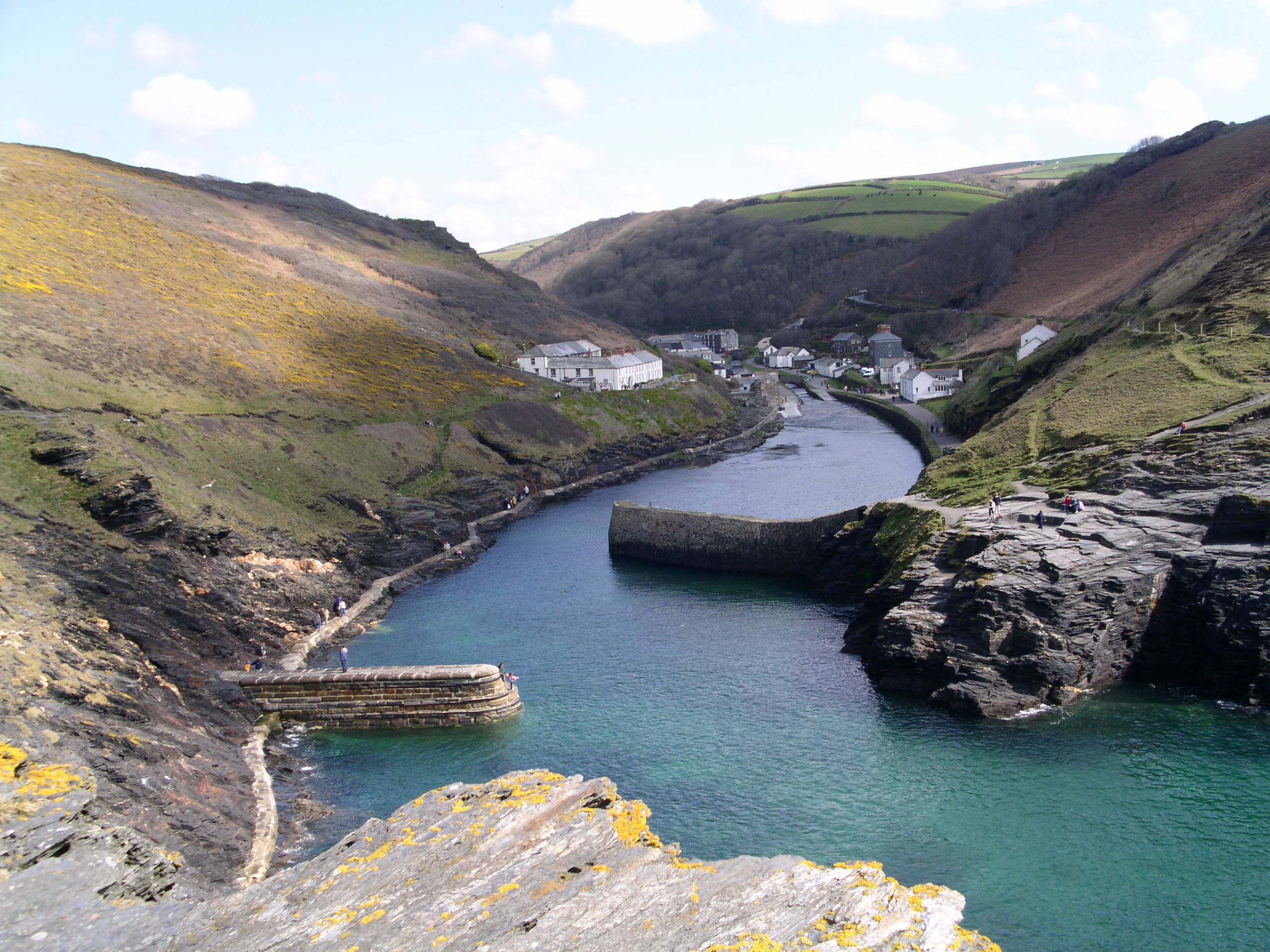
A Cornish harbour of a sort the Irish kings may have used.

According to the Sanas Cormaic, Crimthand Mór mac Fidaig built a great fortress in Cornwall known as Dind Traduí or Dinn Tradui (Dun Tredui/e, fortress of the three ramparts). There appears to be little doubt that it existed, and British archaeologists and linguists have attempted to identify it with a number of sites in Cornwall and in Wales as well, for example, Din Draithou, which is phonetically similar. Din Draithou is widely thought to be the modern Dunster, or the nearby Iron Age hillfort Bat's Castle. It may also be associated with Dind map Letháin, a colonial fortress constructed by the related Uí Liatháin, earlier form Létháin, kingdom of Munster, who is known to have been active in Britain for centuries. They may have retreated to South Wales or Cornwall after being expelled from North Wales by Cunedda, as mentioned in the Historia Brittonum.

In a 1926 paper, Eoin MacNeill discusses the movements of the Uí Liatháin at considerable length, arguing their leadership in the South Irish conquests and the founding of the later dynasty of Brycheiniog, the Welsh genealogies matching Uí Liatháin dynasts in the Irish genealogies. He argues any possible settlement of the Déisi in Wales would have been subordinate until the ousting of the Uí Liatháin by the sons of Cunedda. The founder of Brycheiniog, Brychan, is in all probability the early Uí Liatháin dynast Macc Brocc, while the name Braccan also occurs early in the pedigrees of the Uí Fidgenti and Uí Dedaid, close kindred of the Uí Liatháin. MacNeill further associates this with the sovereignty in Ireland and conquests in Britain of their cousin germane, the monarch Crimthann mac Fidaig.

Crimthand Mór mac Fidaig and the early Uí Liatháin may have belonged to the historical Attacotti (circa 368). Note the correspondence of dates.

== Ancestry ==
The brother and sister, described as the grandchildren of Dáire Cerbba in most sources, are sometimes regarded as belonging to an early branch of the Eóganachta that later became extinct or peripheral. However, it is more likely that all of Dáire Cerbba's descendants belonged to a distinct people, possibly the Dáirine, which is hinted at in an obscure Old Irish poem by Flann Mac Lonáin. In the Banshenchas, Mongfind is called "Mongfind of the Érnai" (Érainn), a people related to the Dáirine. A passage in Rawlinson B 502 states that Dáire Cerbba was born in Mag Breg, Mide, much of which probably remained Érainn or Dáirine territory at the time of his supposed floruit.

Later political genealogies may have removed this generation to make the monarch appear closer to the historical Eóganachta, his natural kindred having mostly fallen into obscurity. Byrne reproduces one of these genealogies, which records the father of Crimthand Mór as a certain Láre Fidach, son of Ailill Flann Bec. This may be a mistake, or an attempt by the Eóganachta literati, who were well known for their political fables, to more closely associate the brother and sister with the new Munster dynasty. In the Book of Lismore, Mongfind is simply called the daughter of Dáire, not of Fidach, and Dáire's father is called Findchad, while Crimthand Mór is not mentioned at all.

=== Death ===
King Crimthann was poisoned by his sister Mongfind in order for her son(s) to win the throne. She died from the act, having taken a sip to of the poison herself in order to convince her brother that it was safe to drink. While on his travels throughout the kingdom of Munster, the poison took effect, and there he died. A cairn was hastily made for the king.

The location of the cairn is uncertain, and there are three possible locations for it, the first being in Glenagross, Co. Clare. The supposed location is known as "Knock Righ Crimthann" ("The Hill of the King's Death"), and the remains of a cairn are still there today. The second location is in Ballycannon, Co. Clare (Baile Cónan); Cónan was the supposed first name of the king. This is the location of the cairn, according to the Bard of Thomond, Michael Hogan, although there are no known remains of a cairn there today. The third possible location is also in Glenagross, where there are three antiquities in a north-south alignment: a standing stone, a ring barrow, and what is described as an "archaeological complex".

Below is a possible and simplified pedigree for Crimthann mac Fidaig, based on Rawlinson B 502:

Mug Nuadat
|
|
Ailill Aulomm
|
|
Eógan Mór
|
|
Fiachu Muillethan
|
|
Ailill Flann Bec
|
|____________________________ ???
|                              |
|                              |
Lugaid Dáire Cerbba
|                              |
|                              |__________________________
|                              |                          |
|                              |                          |
|                         Fidach Uí Fidgenti & Uí Liatháin
|                         |
|                         |__________________________
|                         |                          |
|                         |                          |
|               Crimthann mac Fidaig Mongfind = Eochaid Mugmedón = Cairenn
|                                                         |                  |
|                                                         |                  |
Conall Corc Connachta Niall Noígiallach

== See also ==
- Irish nobility
- Kingdoms of Ireland
- List of Celtic tribes
- Iverni
- Attacotti
- Scoti
- Petty kingdom
- Túathal Techtmar

== Notes ==
Preceded by Eochaid Mugmedon	High King of Ireland; AFM 365–376; FFE 351–368	Succeeded by Niall Noígiallach
