= Niall of the Nine Hostages =

Irish high king

Niall Noígíallach
- High King of Ireland
- Reign: c. 405 (27 years)
- Coronation: Tara
- Predecessor: Eochaid Mugmedon
- Born: c. 4th century
- Died: c. 5th century
- Spouse: 1. Rignach; 2. Indiu
- Father: Eochaid Mugmedon
- Mother: Cairenn Chasdub

Niall Noígíallach (pronounced [ˈn̠ʲiːa̯l̪ n̪oːi̯ˈɣʲiːa̯l̪əx]; Old Irish "having nine hostages"), or Niall of the Nine Hostages, was a legendary, and possibly historical, Irish king. He was reputedly a High King of Ireland, and the progenitor of the Uí Néill dynasties who dominated Ireland from the 6th to the 10th centuries. Although Irish annalistic and chronicle sources place his reign in the late 4th and early 5th centuries, modern scholars date him about half a century later.

== Historicity and dates ==
Niall is presumed, based on the importance of his sons and grandsons, to have been a historical person, but the early Irish annals say little about him. The Annals of Inisfallen date his death before 382, and the Chronicon Scotorum to 411. The later Annals of the Four Masters dates his reign to 379–405, and the chronology of Geoffrey Keating's Foras Feasa ar Éirinn to 368–395.

However, the early annals record the activities of his sons between 429 and 516, an implausibly long period for a single generation, leading scholars like Kathleen Hughes and Francis J. Byrne to conclude that the events of the later half of the 5th century have been extended backwards to accommodate as early a date as possible for the arrival of Saint Patrick, with the effect of pushing Niall back up to half a century. Hughes says "Niall himself must have died not before the middle of the fifth century". Byrne, following James Carney, is a little more precise, dating his death to c. 452.

Niall is placed in the traditional list of High Kings of Ireland. However, the traditional roll of kings and its chronology is now recognised as artificial. The High Kingship did not become a reality until the 9th century, and Niall's status has probably been inflated in line with the political importance of the dynasty he founded.

T. F. O'Rahilly argued that Niall and his sons were responsible for the breakup of the ancient kingdom of Ulster and the creation of the kingdoms of Tír Chonaill and Tír Eoghain, and the satellite kingdom of the Airgíalla. O'Rahilly and Byrne argue that the literary sources, though late and garbled, preserve genuine traditions that Niall led raids on Britain, and perhaps died on one.

== Legendary biography ==
A biography of Niall can be constructed from sources such as the "Roll of Kings" section of the 11th-century Lebor Gabála Érenn, the Annals of the Four Masters, compiled in the 17th century, chronicles such as Geoffrey Keating's Foras Feasa ar Éirinn (1634), and legendary tales like the 11th-century "The Adventure of the Sons of Eochaid Mugmedon" and "The Death of Niall of the Nine Hostages".

=== Early life ===
A legendary account of Niall's birth and early life is given in the possibly 11th-century tale Echtra mac nEchach Muimedóin ("The adventure of the sons of Eochaid Mugmedón"). In it, Eochaid Mugmedón, the High King of Ireland, had five sons: four, Brión, Ailill, Fiachrae and Fergus, by his first wife Mongfind, sister of the king of Munster, Crimthann mac Fidaig; and a fifth, Niall, by his second wife Cairenn Chasdub, daughter of Sachell Balb, king of the Saxons. While Cairenn is pregnant with Niall, the jealous Mongfind forces her to do heavy work, hoping to make her miscarry. She gives birth as she is drawing water, but out of fear of Mongfind, she leaves the child on the ground, exposed to the birds. The baby is rescued and brought up by a poet called Torna. When Niall grows up he returns to Tara and rescues his mother from her labour.

Although it is anachronistic for Niall's mother to have been a Saxon, O'Rahilly argues that the name Cairenn is derived from the Latin name Carina, and that it is plausible that she might have been a Romano-Briton. Keating describes her not as a Saxon but as the "daughter of the king of Britain". Mongfind appears to have been a supernatural personage: the saga "The Death of Crimthann mac Fidaig" says the festival of Samhain was commonly called the "Festival of Mongfind", and prayers were offered to her on Samhain eve.

=== Accession ===
Seeing Niall's popularity among the nobles, Mongfind demands that Eochaid name a successor, hoping it will be one of her sons. Eochaid gives the task to a druid, Sithchenn, who devises a contest between the brothers, shutting them in a burning forge, telling them to save what they can, and judging them based on which objects they choose to save. Niall, who emerges carrying an anvil, is deemed greater than Brión, with a sledgehammer, Fiachrae with bellows and a pail of beer, Ailill with a chest of weapons, and Fergus with a bundle of wood. Mongfind refuses to accept the decision.

Sithchenn takes the brothers to the smith, who makes them weapons, and sends them out hunting. Each brother, in turn, goes looking for water, and finds a well guarded by a hideous hag who demands a kiss in return for water. Fergus and Ailill refuse and return empty-handed. Fiachrae gives her a quick peck, but not enough to satisfy her. Only Niall kisses her properly, and she is revealed as a beautiful maiden, the Sovereignty of Ireland. She grants Niall not only water but the kingship for many generations—twenty-six of his descendants will be High Kings of Ireland. Fiachrae is granted a minor royal line—two of his descendants, Nath Í and Ailill Molt, will be High Kings.

This "loathly lady" motif appears in myth and folklore throughout the world. Variations of this story are told of the earlier Irish high king Lugaid Loígde, in Arthurian legend—one of the most famous versions appears in both Geoffrey Chaucer's "The Wife of Bath's Tale" and the related Gawain romance, The Wedding of Sir Gawain and Dame Ragnelle—and in John Gower's Middle English poem Confessio Amantis.

In another story, the succession is not settled when Eochaid dies, and Mongfind's brother Crimthann takes the high kingship. But while he is away on a tour of his lands in Scotland, Mongfind's sons seize Ireland. Crimthann returns to Ireland intending to give battle. Mongfind, purporting to make peace between her brother and her sons, holds a feast, at which she serves Crimthann a poisoned drink. Crimthann refuses to drink it unless she does too; they both drink, and both die. Niall succeeds to the High Kingship, and Brión becomes his second in command. Another version has Mongfind try to poison Niall, but she takes the poison herself by mistake.

While Niall is the high king, his brothers establish themselves as local kings. Brión rules the province of Connacht, but Fiachrae makes war against him. Brión defeats Fiachrae and hands him over as a prisoner to Niall, but Fiachrae's son Nath Í continues the war and eventually kills Brión. Niall releases Fiachrae, who becomes king of Connacht and Niall's right-hand man. Fiachrae and Ailill then make war against Crimthann's son Eochaid, king of Munster. They defeat him and win great spoils, but Fiachrae is wounded in the battle and dies of his wounds shortly afterwards. The Munstermen renew the battle, capture Ailill and cut him to pieces, and war continues between Munster and Connacht for many years.

=== Death ===
The Lebor Gabála Érenn says there was war between Niall and Énnae Cennsalach, king of Leinster, over the bórama or cow-tribute first imposed on Leinster by Tuathal Techtmar. Énna's son Eochaid is named as Niall's killer in all sources, although the circumstances vary. All sources agree he died outside Ireland. The earliest version of the Lebor Gabála says Eochaid killed him on the English Channel, later versions add that Niall was invading Brittany when this happened. Keating, quoting a Latin Life of Saint Patrick, says that Niall led Irish raids on Roman Britain, and in one of those raids Patrick and his sisters were abducted. Keating associates these raids with those mentioned by Gildas and Bede, and deduces that, since some Irish sources say Patrick was abducted from Brittany, that Niall's raids must have extended to continental Europe as well.

In the saga "The Death of Niall of the Nine Hostages", Eochaid's enmity with Niall begins when he is refused hospitality by Niall's poet, Laidcenn mac Bairchid. He makes war and destroys the poet's stronghold, killing his son Leat (Keating has it that Laidchenn was a druid, and that Eochaid killed his son after he used defamatory language towards him). Laidchenn responds by satirising Leinster so that no corn, grass or leaves grow there for a year. Then Niall makes war against Leinster, and peace is concluded on the condition that Eochaid is handed over. Niall chains Eochaid to a standing stone, and sends nine warriors to execute him, but Eochaid breaks his chain and kills all nine of them with it. He then kills Laidchenn by throwing a stone which lodges in his forehead. Niall exiles him to Scotland. The story then becomes confusing. Niall makes war in Europe as far as the Alps, and the Romans send an ambassador to parlay with him. Abruptly, the tale then has Niall appearing before an assembly of Pictish bards in Scotland, where he is killed by an arrow shot by Eochaid from the other side of the valley. Keating has Eochaid shoot Niall from the opposite bank of the river Loire during his European campaign. His men carry his body home, fighting seven battles on the way, and his foster-father Torna dies of grief. His body is said to have been buried at Ochann, now known as Faughan Hill at Jordanstown, a few miles west of Navan in County Meath. He is succeeded by his nephew Nath Í.

Byrne suggests that Niall's death took place during a raid on Roman Britain. Irish tradition had forgotten that the Romans once ruled Britain, and relocated his remembered confrontations with the Empire to continental Europe, with Alba, the ancient name for Britain, being confused with Elpa, the Alps, or being understood with its later meaning of Scotland. A poem by the 11th-century poet Cináed Ua hArtacáin in the Book of Leinster credits Niall with seven raids on Britain, on the last of which he was killed by Eochaid "above the surf of the Ictian Sea"; a poem attributed to the same poet in Lebor na hUidre credits him with going to the Alps seven times.

=== Family and descendants ===
Keating credits Niall with two wives: Inne, daughter of Lugaid, who bore him one son, Fiachu; and Rignach, who bore him seven sons, Lóegaire, Éndae, Maine, Eógan, Conall Gulban, Conall Cremthainne and Coirpre. These sons are the eponymous ancestors of the various Uí Néill dynasties: Eógan of the Cenél nEógain and Conall Gulban of the Cenél Conaill, making up the northern Uí Néill; Fiachu of the Cenél Fiachach dynasty, Lóegaire (the king who Saint Patrick is said to have converted) of the Cenél Lóegaire, Maine of the Uí Maine, Conall Cremthainne of the Clann Cholmáin and the Síl nÁedo Sláine, and Coirpre of the Cenél Coirpri, making up the southern Uí Néill. The O'Higgins family claims descent from the Southern branch of Uí Néill. Famous descendants include Niall's great-great-grandson Saint Columba, Saint Máel Ruba, the kings of Ailech, the kings of Tir Eogain, and the kings of Tír Conaill. The Scottish Clan Ewen of Otter, Gilchrist; Clan Lamont; the MacSorleys of Monydrain, (of Clan MacDonald of Dunnyveg a branch of Clan Donald); Clan Maclachlan; Clan MacNeil, and the MacSweens all claim descent from an Irish prince of the O'Neill dynasty, Ánrothán Ua Néill/Anrothan O'Neill, son of Áed, son of Flaithbertach Ua Néill, King of Ailech and Cenél nEógain, who left Ireland for Kintyre in the 11th century and died 1036.

As next-generation sequencing has become available, various chief lines have been tested. Although these studies are not coordinated with each other and are ongoing, it is already apparent that not all of these lineages are related to each other within Niall's timeframe. For instance, the chiefs of Clan Donald are now known to belong to a branch of Haplogroup R1a, which split from Niall's hypothetical lineage over 20,000 years ago.

==== Y Chromosome Analysis ====
Following a 2006 hypothesis by Moore et al. suggesting that his Y chromosomal signature had been discovered, popular science journalists and genetic testing companies began promoting the theory that millions alive today have an unbroken descent from Niall.

Geneticists at Trinity College Dublin found that 21 per cent of men from north-western Ireland, 8 per cent from all of Ireland, a substantial percentage of men from western and central Scotland, and about 2 per cent of men from New York bore the same Y-chromosome haplotype. The geneticists estimated that about 2–3 million men bear this haplotype. Moore et al. concluded that these men descend from "a single early-medieval progenitor" and implied this was associated with Niall's dynasty. While Moore et al. did not specifically state that Niall was the progenitor of M222, journalists quickly jumped to that conclusion. According to the PBS documentary series Finding Your Roots, Bill O'Reilly, Stephen Colbert, Colin Quinn, Bill Maher, and the show's host, Henry Louis Gates Jr. all display STR markers consistent with the Irish Modal Haplotype. The series suggested that Niall may have been the most fecund male in Irish history.

This suggestion is no longer plausible. Niall does not have verifiable remains that can be tested. Furthermore, the paper examined only 17 STR loci, which are not a reliable means of verifying descent, as SNPs, which define haplogroups and subclades, would be. Indeed, more recent estimates indicate that the R1b-M222 subclade marked by the Moore et al. haplotype probably originated in the 2nd millennium BC, long before Niall is claimed to have lived, so his descendants would only represent a minority of men in this group even if Niall had been a historical figure.

Perhaps even more problematic is the dearth of M222 lineages in Midlands samples. We would expect to find a large concentration of Niall's descendants there, as the Southern Uí Néill were dominant in that region, but we do not. Because of that, the identification of M222 with Niall's descendants is "difficult to justify".

=== Origin of his epithet ===
There are various versions of how Niall gained his epithet Noígíallach. The saga "The Death of Niall of the Nine Hostages" says that he received five hostages from the five provinces of Ireland (Ulster, Connacht, Leinster, Munster and Meath), and one each from Scotland, the Saxons, the Britons and the Franks. Keating says that he received five from the five provinces of Ireland, and four from Scotland. O'Rahilly suggests that the nine hostages were from the kingdom of the Airgialla (literally "hostage-givers"), a satellite state founded by the Ui Néill's conquests in Ulster, noting that the early Irish legal text Lebor na gCeart ("The Book of Rights") says that the only duty of the Airgíalla to the King of Ireland was to give him nine hostages.

== Family tree ==
Bold indicates a High King of Ireland.

**Tuathal Teachtmhar**
**Fedlimid Rechtmar**
**Conn Cétchathach**
**Art mac Cuinn**	Son	Son	Son	Son
**Cormac mac Airt**
**Cairbre Lifechair**
**Fíacha Sroiptine**
**Muiredach Tirech**
Mongfind	**Eochaid Mugmedon**	Cairenn
Brión	Fiachrae	Ailill	**Niall Noígíallach**	Fergus
Conall Gulban	Endae (of Cenél Énda)	Eogan	Coirpre	**Lóegaire**	Máiné	Conall Cremthainne	Fiachu
Muirdeach	Cormac Caech	**Lughaid mac Loeguire**	Fergus Cerrbel	Ardgal
**Muirchertach mac Ercae**	**Tuathal Máelgarb**	**Diarmait mac Cerbaill**

Preceded by Eochaid Mugmedon	King of The Connachta ? – c. 450	Succeeded by Amalgaid mac Fiachrae

Preceded by Crimthann mac Fidaig	High King of Ireland; FFE 368–395; AFM 378–405	Succeeded by Nath Í

== Bibliography ==
- Bhreathnach, Edel (2005), The Kingship and Landscape of Tara, Dublin: Four Courts Press, ISBN 1-85182-954-7
- Burke, Bernard (1976), Burke's Irish family records, London: Burke's Peerage, ISBN 0-85011-018-1
- Byrne, Francis John (2001), Irish Kings and High-Kings, Dublin: Four Courts Press, ISBN 1-85182-196-1
- Thomas Charles-Edwards, Charles-Edwards, Thomas (2007), Early Christian Ireland, Cambridge University Press, ISBN 978-052136395-2
- Cross, Tom Peete and Clark Harris Slover (eds.), "The Adventures of the Sons of Eochaid Mugmedon", in Ancient Irish Tales. Henry Holt and Company. 1936. pp. 508–513.
- Ambassador Walter Curley, Vanishing Kingdoms: The Irish Chiefs and their Families. Dublin: Lilliput Press. 2004.
- Myles Dillon, The Cycles of the Kings. Oxford. 1946. (Four Courts Press edition, 1995.)
- Duffy, Seán (ed.), Medieval Ireland: An Encyclopedia. Routledge. 2005.
- FitzPatrick, Elizabeth (2004), Royal Inauguration in Gaelic Ireland c. 1100–1600: A Cultural Landscape Study, Boydell Press, ISBN 978-184383090-0
- Patrick Weston Joyce, A Social History of Ancient Ireland, Vol. I and A Social History of Ancient Ireland, Vol. II. Longmans, Green, and Co. 1903.
- Geoffrey Keating, with David Comyn and Patrick S. Dinneen (trans.), The History of Ireland by Geoffrey Keating. 4 Vols. London: David Nutt for the Irish Texts Society. 1902–14.
- Foster, Roy (ed.), The Oxford Illustrated History of Ireland. Oxford University Press. 2001.
- Joynt, Maud (ed. & tr.), "Echtra Mac Echdach Mugmedóin", in Ériu 4 (1910): 91–111.
- Koch, John T. (ed.), Celtic Culture: A Historical Encyclopedia. 5 volumes or single ebook. ABC-CLIO. 2006.
- MacKillop, James, A Dictionary of Celtic Mythology. Oxford. 1998. ISBN 978-0198804840
- Edward MacLysaght, Irish Families: Their Names, Arms and Origins. Irish Academic Press. 4th edition, 1998.
- Mac Niocaill, Gearóid, Ireland before the Vikings. Dublin: Gill and Macmillan. 1972.
- Kuno Meyer (ed.), "The Laud Genealogies and Tribal Histories", in Zeitschrift für Celtische Philologie 8. Halle/Saale, Max Niemeyer. 1912. pp. 291–338.
- Moore, Laoise T., Brian McEvoy, Eleanor Cape, Katharine Simms and Daniel G. Bradley, "A Y-Chromosome Signature of Hegemony in Gaelic Ireland." The American Journal of Human Genetics 78 (February 2006): 334–338.
- Ó Canann, Tomás G., Book Review: Brian Lacey, Cenél Conaill and the Donegal Kingdoms, AD 500–800, Royal Society of Antiquaries of Ireland
- Donnchadh Ó Corráin (ed.), Genealogies from Rawlinson B 502. University College, Cork: Corpus of Electronic Texts. 1997.
- Ó Corráin, Donnchadh, Ireland before the Normans. Dublin: Gill and Macmillan. 1972.
- Dáibhí Ó Cróinín (ed.), A New History of Ireland: Prehistoric and Early Ireland, Vol. 1. Oxford University Press. 2005.
- John O'Donovan (scholar) (ed. and tr.), Annala Rioghachta Eireann. Annals of the Kingdom of Ireland by the Four Masters, from the Earliest Period to the Year 1616. 7 vols. Royal Irish Academy. Dublin. 1848–51. 2nd edition, 1856.
- Standish Hayes O'Grady (ed. and tr.), "Death of Crimthann son of Fidach, and of Eochaidh Muighmedóin's three sons: Brian, Ailill, Fiachra", in Silva Gadelica Williams and Norgate. 1892. pp. 373–378. (also available here )
- O'Grady, Standish H. (ed. and tr.), "The Story of Eochaidh Muighmedóin's Sons", in Silva Gadelica Williams and Norgate. 1892. pp. 368–373.
- John O'Hart, Irish Pedigrees. Dublin. 5th edition, 1892.
- T.F. O'Rahilly, Early Irish History and Mythology. Dublin Institute for Advanced Studies. 1946.
- Richter, Michael, Medieval Ireland: The Enduring Tradition. Palgrave Macmillan. 1996. ISBN 978-0312158125
- Whitley Stokes (ed. and tr.), "Aided Chrimthaind Maic Fhidaig: The Death of Crimthann mac Fidaig", in Revue Celtique 24. 1903. pp. 172–189.
- Stokes, Whitley (ed. and tr.), "Echtra Mac nEchach Muigmedóin: The Adventures of the Sons of Eochaid Muigmedóin", in Revue Celtique 24. 1903. pp. 190–207.
- Welch, Robert (ed.) with Bruce Stewart, The Oxford Companion to Irish Literature. Oxford University Press. 1996.
