= Torna Éices =

Irish poet

Torna, nicknamed Éices or Éces ("the poet, sage"), was a legendary Irish poet of the 5th century, noted as "the last great bard of Pagan Ireland."

He was the foster-father of the Irish kings Corc and Niall of the Nine Hostages, and to him is attributed the Lament for Corc and Niall of the Nine Hostages. In the tale Suidigud Tellaig na Cruachna ("The Settling of the Manor of Crúachan"), he is the author of a poem on famous men and women who were buried in the cemetery of Crúachan (Rathcroghan).
