= Attorney General Sutton =

Attorney General Sutton may refer to:

- Nicholas Sutton (lawyer) (1440s–1478), Attorney General for Ireland
- William Sutton (lawyer) (c. 1410–1480), Attorney General for Ireland

== See also ==
- General Sutton (disambiguation)
