= Clerk of the Crown and Hanaper =

The Clerk of the Crown and Hanaper was a civil servant within the Irish Chancery in the Dublin Castle administration. His duties corresponded to those of the English Chancery offices of Clerk of the Crown, Clerk of the Hanaper, and Clerk of the Petty Bag. Latterly, the office's most important functions were to issue writs of election to the Westminster Parliament, both for the House of Commons and for Irish representative peers in the House of Lords.

== Functions ==
In 1859 commissioners investigating the Irish Chancery described the duties of the office thus:

The office of the Clerk of the Crown and Hanaper in Chancery is regulated by the Act of 6 and 7 Wm. IV., cap. 74, which provides that the office shall consist of the Clerk of the Crown and Hanaper, and two clerks to be appointed by him.

The duties of the office are threefold:—first, those connected with the petty-bag or law side of the Court; secondly, preparing and issuing certain writs specified in the schedule to the Act of 4 Geo. IV., cap. 61; and thirdly, swearing gentlemen into office before the Lord Chancellor.

The business of the petty-bag or law side of the Court is confined to proceedings to enforce the performance of a recognizance entered into in the Court, and to proceedings in cases of debt against officers of the Court, there being an antiquated privilege appertaining to officers of the Court of Chancery, that they are not amenable in cases of debt to the ordinary tribunals of the country, but must be sued in their own Court.

Prior to the acts, enumerated thus in 1817 by commissioners into legal costs:

- As clerk of the Crown, it is his duty, as appears by his patent, to make out and engross all letters patent for the appointment of sheriffs; all commissions of the peace and jail delivery (clearing out of prisoners), and all process in recognizances of the staple; with some other duties, not now of frequent recurrence.
- As clerk of the Hanaper, he makes out all letters patent for lands granted by the Crown; all patents of nobility, spiritual and temporal; all presentations by the Crown, to ecclesiastical dignities, and benefices; he is also to prepare and engross all charters of incorporation, grants of fairs, markets, letters of denization, pensions, offices, &c.; and all injunctions, and writs of execution of decrees in Chancery, writs of attachment, and commissions of rebellion, with other Chancery writs.

Until 1836, the Clerk was appointed by letters patent, and could himself appoint a deputy. There were no statutory qualifications required for the post.

In 1868 the Public Record Office of Ireland catalogued the older records it archived from the Hanaper office thus:

1. Writs of Election and Returns of Members of Parliament.
2. Writs and Returns electing Temporal Peers
3. Commissions of Lunacy, Idiocy, &c, and Returns.
4. Writs of Ad quod Damnum.
5. Commissions of Inquiry, and Inquisitions thereunder.
6. Writs to elect Coroners, and Returns.
7. Significavit and Warrants for Writs of Excommunicate Capiendo
8. Apostles and Warrants for Commissions of Delegates
9. Dedimuses to swear in Justices of the Peace, and a number of Six Clerk dockets
10. Fiants
11. Proclamations and Warrants for sealing them.
12. Commissions of Valuation.
13. Warrants for Pardons
14. Commissions to examine Witnesses before Lords Deputy and Council
15. Writs of Ease.
16. Sheriffs' Patents.
17. Warrants for superseding Magistrates.
18. Warrants of Appointment to the office of Custos Rotulorum.
19. Warrants appointing Masters Extraordinary.
20. Commissions of Array.
21. Commissions of Perambulation relating to ecclesiastical matters.
22. Commissions of Assize and Association.
23. Writs of Summons to Parliament (Irish)
24. Rolls of Allegiance
25. Roll of Oaths of Roman Catholic and Assistant Barristers
26. Writs of Scire Facias.

A mandate from Edward IV enumerates "that the Clerc of the Hanapier continuelly receive the fees of the sele of writts, comisssions, and patents, and also all suche fynes as shall be made in the Chaunsery, and thereupon pay the Chaunsellor his fees, wages and rewardes accustomed, and deliver the remnant unto the Kyng's Ex[checquer]. upon his accomptes, which he shall make yerly therof". It also mandates the clerk to appoint deputies in the King's Bench and Common Pleas to collect the fees and fines from those courts.

== History ==
James Roderick O'Flanagan states:

The office of Clerk of the Hanaper is of old date in Ireland. In this office the writs relating to the suits of the subject, and the return thereon, were anciently kept in hanaperio, a hamper; while those relating to the crown were placed in parva baga, a little bag; whereon arose the names Hanaper and Petty Bag Offices.

The offices of Clerk of the Hanaper and Clerk of the Crown in Chancery were originally separate but came to be held by the same person in the seventeenth century and were later formally merged. From 1888 the holder was ex officio secretary to the Lord Chancellor of Ireland.

In the early centuries, the Clerk was often a qualified lawyer. He might reasonably hope for promotion to the office of Attorney-General for Ireland, or to the Bench. At least five Clerks in the fourteenth and fifteenth centuries achieved judicial office, or the Attorney-Generalship. The office was an onerous one: in 1427 Stephen Roche, later Attorney-General, petitioned the Privy Council complaining of the great labours he had endured in the King's business, without reward "to his great impoverishment". The Council granted his petition and awarded him 10 marks.

== Abuses ==
In 1789, the Attorney-General for Ireland told the Irish House of Commons that it had "been a matter of necessity to purchase home the office of Clerk of the Crown and Hanaper to the court of Chancery; the person who had held that employment had been for twenty years an absentee, during which time the business had been done in such an irregular and slovenly manner, that a reform was indispensable". The 1817 commissioners noted disapprovingly that the appointed Clerk was paid £1800 annually by a deputy who in return kept all the fees chargeable by the office. They recommended that the Clerk should be paid a fixed salary and required to execute the office in person rather than by deputy; this was mandated by the Court of Chancery (Ireland) Acts of 1823 and 1836. The 1836 act formally abolished the existing patented office (compensating the holder) and established a replacement office on a statutory basis so that it could be subject to regulation. The 1859 commissioners recommended that the office be abolished, its few functions transferred elsewhere in Chancery, and the prolix form of its documents be simplified to reduce the cost of scriveners.

== Abolition ==
The last Clerk of the Crown and Hanaper was Gerald Horan, K.C. (1880–1949), who issued the writs for the June 1921 Stormont election and June 1922 Free State provisional parliament election, and a royal charter in September 1922 to the Law Society of Northern Ireland. His office was one of the parts of the Dublin Castle administration which had not been transferred to the Provisional Government by 27 September 1922.

In the Irish Free State, the offices of Chancery and Hanaper were presumed not to have survived the coming into force of the Free State Constitution on 6 December 1922. Writs for the 1923 Free State election were issued by the clerk of the Dáil. The office's residual statutory election functions were formally transferred to the Department of Local Government and Public Health when that was established under the Ministers and Secretaries Act 1924. The office was implicitly abolished by the Court Officers Act 1926.

In Northern Ireland, the Speaker of the House of Commons of Northern Ireland in March 1923 refused to allow the moving of a by-election writ because there was no official appointed to do so. An order in council of 12 August 1924 transferred the Clerk of the Crown and Hanaper's election functions in Northern Ireland to the Clerk of the Crown for Northern Ireland.

== List ==
=== Clerks of the Hanaper ===
- 1297: John Marshal
- 1373–c.1378: Thomas de Everdon
- 1382: Richard Carran; Thomas Talbot; John Newport; Nicholas Hotot
- 1383–86: Robert Sutton;Thomas de Everdon jointly
- 1386: John Bykeley
- 1388: Robert Huntingdon
- 1388–95: Robert Clayton
- c.1395–99: Richard Sydgrave
- 1399-1410: Hugh Bavent, or Banent
- 1410–after 1423: John Passvaunt
- 1425–27: Stephen Roche, first term
- 1427–28: Richard Newport (ejected as no longer resident)
- 1428–30: Stephen Roche, second term
- 1430: James Blakeney
- c.1431–37 William Sutton
- 1439: Adam Veldon
- 1439–after 1442: Thomas Beltoft and John Bolt in survivorship
- 1450–after 1461: James Prendergast (alias Collyn)
- 1461: Patrick Cogley
- 1479: Richard Nangle
- until 1532: Nicholas Wycombe
- 1532–35: William Fitzwilliam
- from 1535: jointly to
  Nicholas Stanyhurst (father of James Stanihurst) and
  Thomas Alen (brother of John Alan)
- from 1554: Thomas Alen alone as the last survivor
- c.1559–after 1588 Lancelot Alford
- by 1592: William Phillips (granted in 1588 in reversion from Alford's death)

=== Clerks of the Crown ===
- 1414–43 Thomas Brown
- 1443–60 Hugh Wogan
- 1553: Nicholas Stanyhurst

=== Clerks of the Crown and Hanaper ===
- 1603–37: Sir John King
- 1606–after 1619: Francis Edgeworth (brother of Edward Edgeworth) jointly with Sir John King
- 1637–after 1666: George Carleton (Edward Nicholas in 1628 secured the reversion on the death of King, and sold it to Carleton for £1060, granted in 1631.)
- After 1666: William Domville (secured in reversion by his father Sir William Domville, Attorney General for Ireland)
- 1670–74: Lancelot and Richard Domville (sons of the elder William Domville)
- 1674–1721: Thomas Domvile, later 1st Baronet (son of the elder William Domville)
- 1689 Thomas Arthur (Patriot Parliament appointment)
- 1721–68: Sir Compton Domvile, 2nd Baronet
- 1768–88: Henry Seymour Conway (His uncle Henry Seymour Conway was appointed on 15 January 1757 in reversion on Domvile's death)
- 1788–95 Sir Lucius O'Brien, 3rd Baronet
- 1795–97: William FitzGerald, 2nd Duke of Leinster
- 1797–1806: Edmund Pery, Lord Glentworth (later 1st Earl of Limerick)
- 1806–07: George Forbes, 6th Earl of Granard
- 1807–14: George Nugent, 7th Earl of Westmeath
- 1815–37: George Forbes, 6th Earl of Granard (again)
- 1837–56: Christopher Fitzsimon
- 1857–58: John O'Connell
- 1858–80: Sir Ralph Smith Cusack
- 1880–82: Sir Robert William Arbuthnot Holmes
- 1882–88: William Neilson Hancock
- 1888–1915: Joseph Nugent Lentaigne
- 1915–22: Gerald Horan
