= Stephen Roche (Attorney-General) =

Irish Crown official and law officer

Stephen Roche (died after 1444) was an Irish Crown official and law officer. He held office as Attorney-General for Ireland and was a member of the Privy Council of Ireland.

== Career ==
Roche is first heard of as an official in the Irish Chancery in the early 1420s. In 1423 he was Chief Engrosser (copier) of the Exchequer of Ireland. His duties as Engrosser were onerous enough for him to require the appointment of a deputy, Alexander White. He visited England in the same year. In 1425 he was appointed to the senior position of Clerk of the Crown and Hanaper, with the same fee as his predecessor, John Passavant, i.e. 100 shillings a year, plus "certain arrears". He was superseded in 1427 but held office again from 1428-1430. He petitioned the Council for compensation for his "heavy labour" on royal business, which had required numerous journeys to 12 counties of Leinster and Munster at his own expense, "to his great impoverishment". The petition was granted and he was awarded 10 marks. He had made a similar petition in 1426. He also complained that his predecessor John Passavant on leaving office had failed to give a full account of the amount owing to the office. In 1434 he acted as attorney to Thomas Yong, the Prior of Mullingar, jointly with John Cornwalsh, the future Chief Baron of the Irish Exchequer.

In 1441 he was appointed Attorney General, or King's Attorney as the office was then generally known. He was also a member of the Privy Council: this was a sign of the regard in which he was held by the Crown, as the Attorney General at the time did not automatically have a seat on the Council. He attended the meeting of the Great Council of Ireland which was held at Naas, County Kildare in 1441. The Council authorised him to go to England to lay the Irish Government's grievances about the misrule of Ireland before King Henry VI and his Council. An itemised list of these grievances survives: they include the uncertain legal status of Englishmen born in Ireland, the utter inadequacy of the Irish revenue and customs, and the failure of the towns of Cork and Limerick to pay the rents due on their fee farm grants.

He served as Attorney General until 1444, when his place was taken by William Sutton.

== Sources ==
- Casey, James The Irish Law Officers Round Hall Sweet and Maxwell 1996
- Otway-Ruthven, A.J. A History of Medieval Ireland Barnes and Noble reissue New York 1993
- Richardson, H. G. and Sayles, G.O. The Irish Parliament in the Middle Ages University of Pennsylvania Press 1952
