= Gerald Horan =

Barrister and Crown official in Ireland

Gerald Horan (3 May 1879 – 9 May 1949) was an Irish barrister and public servant who was the last Clerk of the Crown and Hanaper of the Dublin Castle administration and first Master of the High Court in the Irish Free State.

== Early life ==
The son of a solicitor, Horan attended Catholic University School and Trinity College Dublin. He was called to the bar in 1901 and made King's Counsel in 1915.

== Career ==
When Ignatius O'Brien was Attorney-General for Ireland, Horan was his junior, and when O'Brien became Lord Chancellor of Ireland, Horan became his private secretary, and then Permanent Secretary to the Lord Chancellor, and Clerk of the Crown and Hanaper, in 1915, when incumbent Joseph Nugent Lentaigne died. He was also Secretary to the Rule-Making Committee of the High Court of Justice in Ireland.

Horan exercised various functions by virtue of being Clerk of the Crown and Hanaper. Under the Government of Ireland Act 1920, he was returning officer for the 1921 Northern Ireland general election and both returning officer and acting clerk for both houses of the abortive 1921 Parliament of Southern Ireland. He also received notice from the Clerk of the Parliaments at Westminster of the deaths of Irish representative peers to enable the election of a successor.

The Great Seal of Ireland was kept in the Crown and Hanaper office. When the Constitution of the Irish Free State came into force on 6 December 1922, Horan informed Hugh Kennedy, the incoming Free State Attorney General, that he was retaining the old seal and had given a new one to Tim Healy, the new Governor-General. Horan gave the old seal to the National Museum of Ireland in January 1926.

On Cornelius Gregg's recommendation, Horan was put in charge of administration of the new state's superior courts. When Horan signed the first proclamation issued by the Governor General, making New Year's Day 1923 a bank holiday, the Lurgan Mail described him as Clerk of the Crown and Hanaper and noted that he was "not dignified by any d[e]scription in the proclamation". When the Courts of Justice Act 1924 reconstituted the court system under the terms of the 1922 constitution, he wrote a guide to the act's operation, and became Master of the new High Court when the post was created in 1926. Horan gave evidence to an Oireachtas committee in 1930 that some of the quasi-judicial powers of the office of Master might violate Article 64 of the Constitution.

Although elections of Irish representative peers stopped after 1922, death notices were still sent from Westminster and Horan acknowledged (as "Master of the High Court, formerly Clerk of the Crown and Hanaper") receipt of each and said it had been forwarded to the President of the Executive Council, who did nothing with it.

== Personal life ==
Horan married Kathleen Scallan, niece of Ignatius O'Brien's wife, Anne. They had a son, Desmond, husband of Paralympian Joan Horan, and a daughter, Sheelah Duggan.

He retired on turning 70 and died at home eight days later.

== Sources ==
- House of Lords Committee For Privileges (5 July 1966). Report on the Petition of the Irish Peers, together with the Cases of the Petitioners, Proceedings of the Committee, and the Minutes of Evidence. Sessional papers. Vol. HL 1966–67 VIII (53) 896. London: Her Majesty's Stationery Office.
- Oireachtas Joint Committee on the Courts of Justice Act 1924 and the Civil Jurisdiction of the Courts (19 November 1930). Report. Official publications. Vol. T.69. Dublin: Stationery Office.
