= Peter Trevers =

Irish lawyer and judge (died 1468)

Peter Trevers, or Travers (died 1468) was an Irish barrister and judge of the fifteenth century.

He belonged to a family which had settled in County Meath in the thirteenth century. John de Tryvers, judge of the Court of Common Pleas (Ireland) c.1283-5, was a member of the same family. He may also have been a relative of Peter Treveris, a well-known printer who was working in London in the 1520s. The family is thought to have been Cornish in origin: the most usual spelling of the name is Treffry. In 1460 Michael Trevers, possibly a relative of Peter, was given liberty by the Parliament of Ireland to enter on lands at Dubber and Coolock, north of Dublin city, in satisfaction of a debt owed to him by Piers de Coolock. In 1461 Peter granted the manor of Esker, near Lucan, Dublin, a royal property leased to favoured servants of the Crown, to John Trevers, possibly his brother or cousin, for Peter's lifetime.

== Career ==
Trevers is first heard of in London, where he was studying law at the Inns of Court, in 1456. Ireland had no law school then, and thus young Irishmen who wished to become lawyers and in due course, judges in their home country, were obliged to seek permission from the Crown to study law in London. He was appointed King's Serjeant in 1460. He was a man of considerable wealth, who owned the impressive Baldongan Castle in Skerries, County Dublin, and a nearby estate at Courtlough.

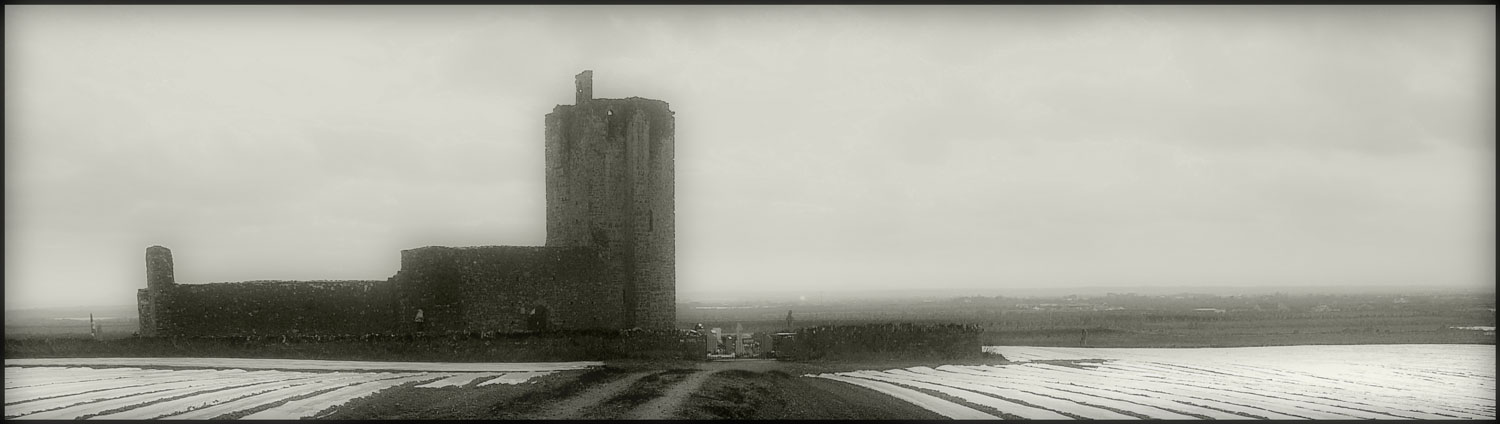
Baldongan Castle.

During the Wars of the Roses, the dynastic struggle between the rival York and Lancaster branches of the English royal family, Trevers, like most of the Anglo-Irish gentry, supported the Yorkist cause. In 1460 he accompanied Richard, Duke of York to England when York unsuccessfully claimed the English Crown. In 1461, following the Yorkist triumph, Trevers was appointed Master of the Rolls in Ireland by Richard's son, King Edward IV: the office was granted first to Patrick Cogley, but Cogley quickly exchanged it for the more lucrative offices of Clerk of the Crown and Hanaper and Clerk of the Parliaments.

In 1465/6 two English merchants, William York senior and his son William junior appointed Trevers their attorney. He was to receive £40 from three individuals of whom the best known is Michael Tregury, Archbishop of Dublin, and in case of default to sue on their behalf on the bond by which they acknowledged the debt. The Yorks, who were based in London, admitted that their business seal was not well known to merchants of Ireland, hence presumably the need for an attorney. Whether it was common for the Master to act in this way - effectively as a lawyer in private practice - is unclear.

In 1465 Trevers was entrusted with raising men for the defence of Dublin. He died in 1468.

== Family ==
He married Elizabeth Holywood, or Holywode, daughter and co-heiress of Sir Robert Holywood of Artane Castle. Elizabeth had been twice widowed; her first husband was James Nugent, eldest son of William Fitzrichard Nugent, 1st Baron Delvin, by whom she had four sons, including Richard, 2nd Baron Delvin, and her second husband was Sir Thomas Dowdall, by whom she had one daughter. She and Peter had three children:

- Nicholas.
- Anne, who married Patrick Netterville of Dowth, County Meath and had issue, including John, who succeeded to his father's estates; they were the ancestors of Viscount Netterville.
- Catherine, who married into the Cusack family.

== Sources ==
- Ball, F. Elrington The Judges in Ireland 1221-1921 John Murray London 1926
- Kenny, Colum King's Inns and the Kingdom of Ireland Irish Academic Press 1992
- Lodge, John and Archdall, Mervyn Peerage of Ireland Dublin 1839
- Patent Roll 1 Edward IV
- Smyth, Constantine Joseph Chronicle of the Law Officers of Ireland London Butterworths 1839
- Statute of the Parliament of Ireland 38 Hen. 6. c. 27 (I)
