= Walter Champfleur =

15th-century Irish judge

Walter Champfleur or de Champfleur (died 1498 or 1499) was an Irish cleric and judge of the fifteenth century, who played a leading role in Irish politics.

He was probably a Dubliner, and had cousins living near Dublin city. He was Abbot of the Cistercian house of St. Mary's Abbey, Dublin for more than 30 years: he became Abbot in 1467, in succession to John Handcock. The Abbey was located near the junction of present-day Abbey Street and Capel Street in Dublin city centre. Before his appointment as Abbot he had been one of the Irish Canonical Visitors of his Order.

== Activities as Abbot ==
As Abbot, he secured the passing of a statute of the Irish Parliament in the session of 1471-2, confirming the Abbey in all its rights and possessions, and the validity of all its charters. Parliament further enacted that the Abbey had the right to have all legal proceedings which might infringe its liberties annulled.

Champfleur used the statute of 1471 to good effect in defending a lawsuit brought against the Abbey in the Court of Exchequer (Ireland) for £100, this being the estimated value of some casks of Spanish wine whose ownership was in dispute. The casks had washed ashore at Portmarnock in north County Dublin following a shipwreck in December 1465. The Sheriff of County Dublin had seized them as the property of the county, only to have them confiscated in turn by Champfleur's predecessor, Abbot Handcock, who claimed them as Abbey property. Champfleur successfully maintained this claim.

A further statute passed in the session of 1475-6 permitted the Abbot and his successors, as well as a number of other prominent clerics like the Prior of Great Connell Priory, to deal with their lands in territories controlled by the "enemies of the King" i.e. "the hostile Irish", without committing any crime. The Abbot and his successors were exempted from the usual penalties for having dealings with the Irish. They were specifically permitted to enter contracts for the sale of land and foodstuffs with them, "in time of war as well as peace", and in a rather curious detail, were allowed to act as godfathers to Irish children.

He was one of the founder members of the Dublin Baker's Guild, which received its charter in 1479.

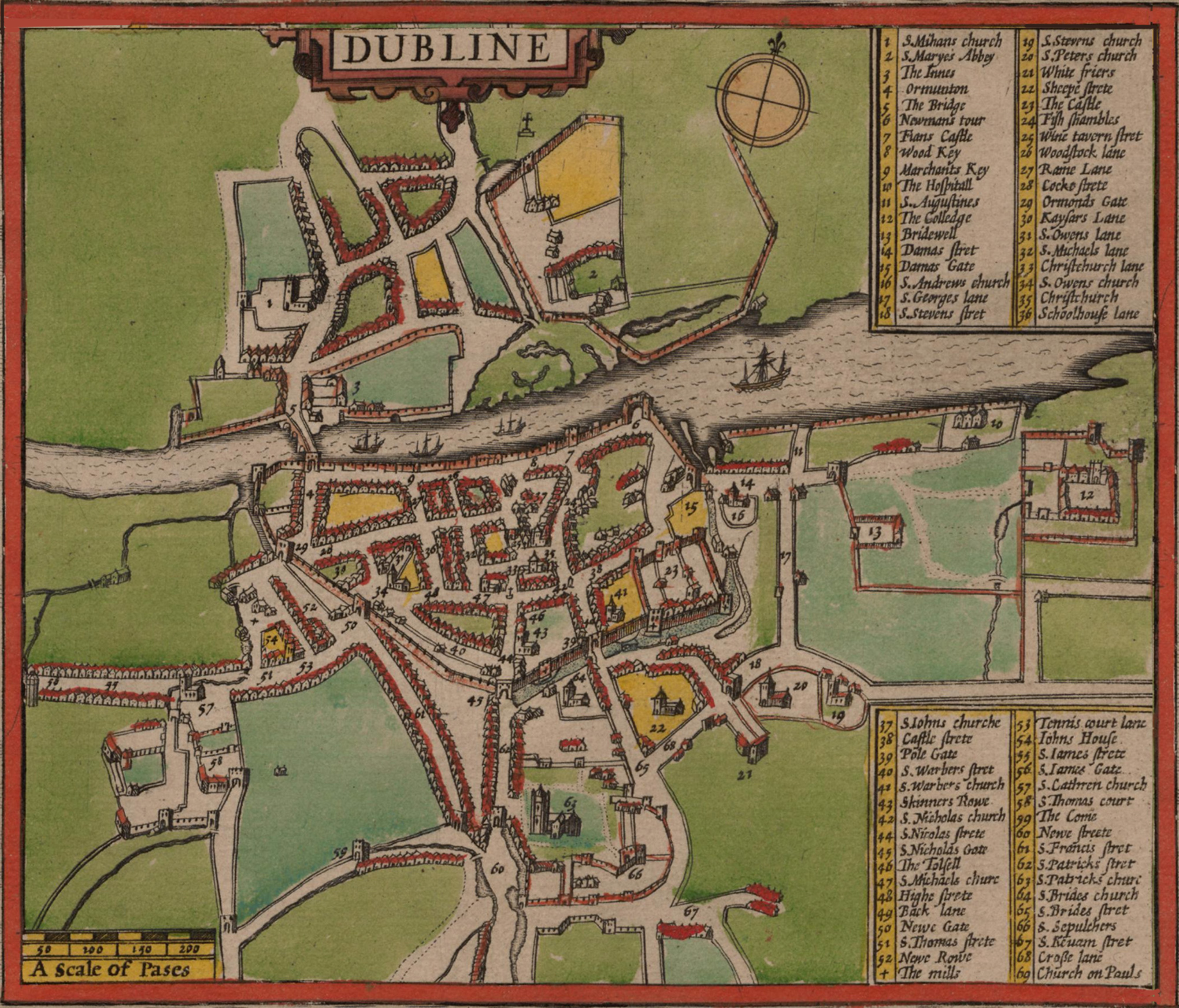
John Speed's map of Dublin 1610: the site of the former St. Mary's Abbey can be seen on the left, north of the river

== Judge ==
Champfleur was Lord Keeper of the Great Seal of Ireland in 1479, and again following the death of the bitterly unpopular William Sherwood, Bishop of Meath (Elrington Ball suggests that he actually held the more senior office of Lord Chancellor of Ireland) from late 1482 to early 1483, when he was replaced by Robert St Lawrence, 3rd Baron Howth.

== Lambert Simnel ==
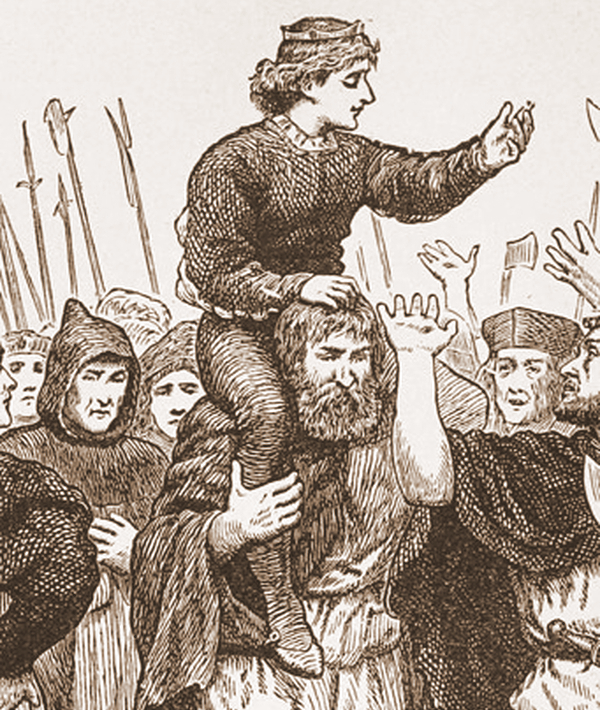
Lambert Simnel in Ireland

Like almost all of the Anglo-Irish ruling class, who were led by Gerald FitzGerald, 8th Earl of Kildare, he made the mistake of supporting the spurious claim of the pretender Lambert Simnel to the English Crown. Simnel appeared in Ireland in 1487, posing as a surviving Prince of the previous Yorkist dynasty. Simnel was crowned King of England at Christchurch Cathedral, Dublin in May 1487, but his cause was crushed by King Henry VII at the Battle of Stoke Field the following month. The victorious Henry was magnanimous to his enemies, and Champfleur shared in the general pardon issued by the King in 1488 (Sir James Keating, the notoriously turbulent Prior of the Knights Hospitallers at Kilmainham, was the one notable exception to the King's clemency). Champfleur took the required oath of allegiance to Henry in July 1488, in the presence of Sir Richard Edgcumbe, the English official charged with bringing the Anglo-Irish nobility into obedience, and with punishing those, like Prior Keating, who were regarded as incorrigible rebels.

== Adviser to the Earl of Ormond ==
As well as his performing his duties as Abbot, Champfleur acted as political adviser and financial agent to the powerful Anglo-Irish magnate Thomas Butler, 7th Earl of Ormond. He collected the Earl's rents, stored money for him, and kept him informed of political developments in Dublin. In particular, while Parliament was in session, Champfleur on at least two occasions advised Ormond to have private bills drafted to secure his own interests, which the Earl duly did.

In 1497 Walter wrote inquiring about the health of Ormond's second wife Lora Berkeley, who was pregnant, and offering his prayers that "God send (her) a good and fair deliverance". The expected child was Lady Elizabeth Butler, who survived infancy but died in her early teens. On a more practical note, he suggested that one of his cousins would be a suitable tenant for the Earl's farm at Rush in north county Dublin, which was apparently in a ruinous condition. This is one of the few known references to Walter's family.

== Death and reputation ==
He is usually said to have died in 1497, but there is evidence that he was still alive in February 1498; he may have died later that year or in the following year. His death was a blow to Ormond, whose relations with the new Abbot of St Mary's, John Orum (previously one of the monks of the House), were very bad: Orum refused to hand over monies collected for Ormond by Champfleur, despite admitting that the funds in question were the Earl's property.

Champfleur was mourned by his monks and by the people of Dublin as an "aged, prudent and learned man", and a man of energy and initiative who had made vigorous, if not very successful, attempts to reform abuses within his Order. The judge Nicholas Sutton thought highly of him, and on his death in 1478 made him both his executor and tutor of his children.
