= Edward Butler (Irish judge) =

Irish judge

Edward Butler (died 1584), also called Edmund Butler, was an Anglo-Irish barrister, Law Officer and judge of the Elizabethan era. He was one of very few Law Officers who was described as Deputy Attorney-General for Ireland.

== Life ==
Edward Butler belonged to the great Butler dynasty, but his precise relationship to the Earl of Ormond is unclear. It has been suggested that he was a son of the Ninth Earl, who did have two sons called Edward and Edmund; both however were professional soldiers, rather than lawyers, although they did study at the King's Inns.

He was a native of County Kilkenny and lived for much of his life in Callan. He had a low opinion of the people of his native county, remarking that Kilkenny would never lack for thieves even if two hundred of them were hanged there every year.

He entered Grays Inn in 1556, was called to the Bar, and returned to Ireland to practice. By 1567, he was one of the leaders of the Irish bar. He was Crown Attorney for County Tipperary in 1572. Between 1578 and 1580, he was described as Deputy Attorney General, one of the very few references to such an office. He became Attorney-General for Ireland in 1582.

Having been spoken of for years as being qualified for the highest judicial offices, he was appointed a justice of the Court of King's Bench (Ireland) in 1583. In 1584, he was recommended as Lord Chief Justice of Ireland, but died the same year.

== Sources ==
- Ball, F. Elrington The Judges in Ireland 1221–1921 London John Murray 1926
- Kenny, Colum King's Inns and the Kingdom of Ireland Dublin Irish Academic 1992
- Smyth, Constantine Joseph Chronicle of the Law Officers of Ireland London Butterworths 1839

== Notes ==
Legal offices
Preceded by Christopher Flemyng, or Fleming	Attorney-General for Ireland; 1582-1583	Succeeded by Charles Calthorpe
