= Edward Edgeworth =

Irish Anglican bishop

Edward Edgeworth, DD (died 1595) was an Anglican bishop in the last decade of the sixteenth century.

An Englishman, probably from Edgware, north London, he was Vicar of East Kirkby before coming over to Ireland, probably in the early 1560s. He was appointed a Prebendary of St Michan in St Patrick's Cathedral in 1586; and later that year of Tipperkevin in Christ Church Cathedral in the same city. 1n 1590 he became Vicar of Carrickfergus and in 1593, Bishop of Down and Connor. He died two years later.

He amassed a considerable fortune, which he left to his brother Francis, who was appointed joint Clerk of the Crown and Hanaper in Ireland in about 1606 and held the office until about 1620. Francis founded a gifted Irish dynasty whose most notable members were Richard Lovell Edgeworth and his daughter, the novelist Maria Edgeworth. The family gave its name to Edgeworthstown, County Longford.

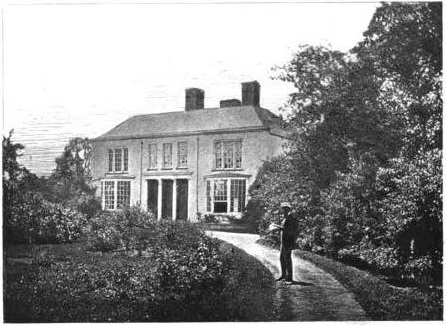
Edgeworthstown House, home of the Edgeworth family
