= General Sutton =

General Sutton may refer to:

- Francis Arthur Sutton (1884–1944), British-born National Revolutionary Army major general for Chinese warlord Zhang Zuolin
- Hugh Sutton (1867–1928), British Army major general
- Loree Sutton (born 1959), U.S. Army brigadier general
- Richard Sutton (British Army officer) (1674–1737), British Army lieutenant general

== See also ==
- Attorney General Sutton (disambiguation)
