= Thomas Archbold =

Irish Crown official and judge

Thomas Archbold, or Thomas Galmole (died after 1506) was a goldsmith and silversmith, who also qualified as a lawyer, and rose to become a senior Crown official and judge in Ireland in the late fifteenth and early sixteenth centuries. He was Master of the Mint in Ireland for many years.

== Background ==
He was born in Dublin, to a long-established Dublin family. The Archbold family were among the earliest English settlers in Ireland. William Archbold, a senior member of the Royal household who was appointed one of the Irish Barons of the Exchequer in 1378, was his ancestor. A royal writ of 1400, concerning the appointment of one William Archbold (probably either the judge or his son) as Constable of the fort of Newcastle Mackynegan in County Wicklow, names no less than five members of the Archbold family, all living in Dublin, as sureties for his good conduct. Richard Archbold, Constable of Dublin Castle in the 1480s, may also have been a relative of Thomas. Although the sources are clear that he was a member of the Archbold family of Dublin, he was also called Thomas Galmole.

Thomas was a goldsmith by profession. He was described as a "master and worker of money in silver".He is first heard of in 1465 when he was having great difficulty collecting a debt: according to Elrington Ball, he had to make forty journeys between Dublin and County Meath in pursuit of it. Presumably this was a business debt, rather than a Crown one. He had workshops in both Dublin and Waterford.

== The Grey controversy ==
He was appointed Attorney General for Ireland, or Narrator Regis, in 1478 (presumably, although the Patent Rolls state clearly that he was a goldsmith, he had also acquired some legal qualifications) and in the same year he was made Master of the Royal Mint in Ireland, an appointment confirmed by a statute of the Irish Parliament. He shared the office of Master in Waterford, where Walter Marshall retained the title Marshal Master of the Mint. In 1483 Archbold was ordered to produce a new Irish coinage of pennies and halfpennies bearing the King's head on one side, and the Irish harp on the other.

As Master of the Mint, he was soon drawn into a major political controversy when Lord Portlester, the Lord Chancellor of Ireland, refused to hand over the Great Seal of Ireland to Lord Grey of Codnor, the newly appointed Lord Deputy of Ireland: this was part of a comprehensive challenge by the Anglo-Irish ruling class to Grey's authority, which they saw as a threat to their own power. King Edward IV tried to resolve the problem by ordering Archbold to issue a new Great Seal "as near the pattern and fabric of the other Seal as possible, with the addition of a rose", and declaring that the original Seal, now held by Portlester, was declared to be "damned, annulled and suspended", while all his acts as Lord Chancellor were "utterly repudiated". Portlester and his allies, undeterred, continued their defiance of Lord Grey, who, despairing of being able to establish his authority, left Ireland within the year.

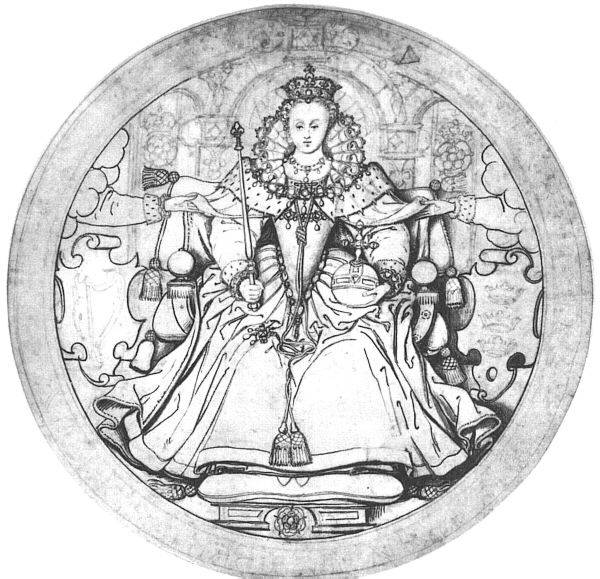
Sketch for a Great Seal of Ireland, designed by Nicholas Hilliard for Queen Elizabeth I

== Judge ==
Soon afterwards Archbold was appointed a Baron of the Court of Exchequer for life, but he was later superseded. What legal qualifications he had is unclear. He acted as Deputy Master of the Rolls in Ireland to Thomas Dowdall in 1479, when Dowdall was in England on official business. He continued in office as Master of the Mint.

== Simnel's Rebellion ==
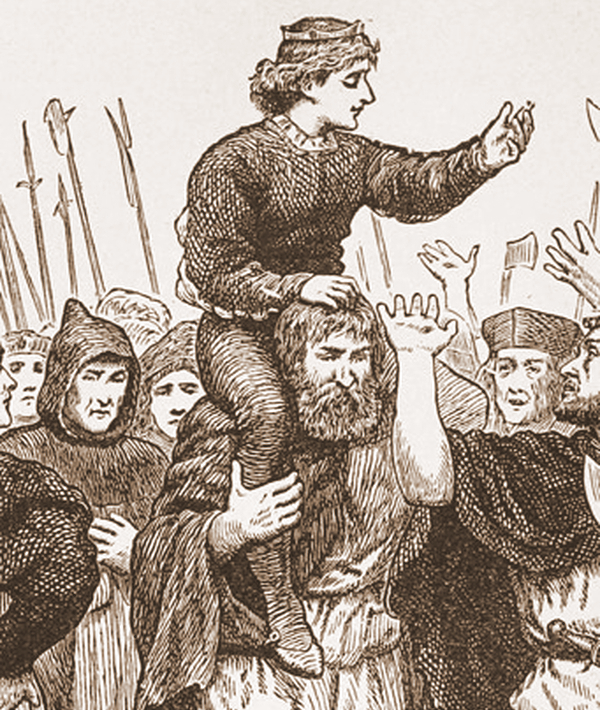
Lambert Simnel in Ireland

Like almost all of the Anglo-Irish ruling class, he supported the claim of the pretender Lambert Simnel to the English Crown in 1487. Simnel's attempt to seize the throne ended with his crushing defeat at the Battle of Stoke Field. The victorious King, Henry VII, was merciful to the Irish rebels, as he was to Simnel himself, who was taken into the Royal Household as a servant: nearly all the rebels received a royal pardon the following year, including Archbold, who was restored to his seat on the Court of Exchequer at the same time.

He was reappointed Master of the Mint in 1506, with power to act through a Deputy, possibly because of his advancing age.
