= Baldongan Church =

- Túr Bhaile Donnagáin
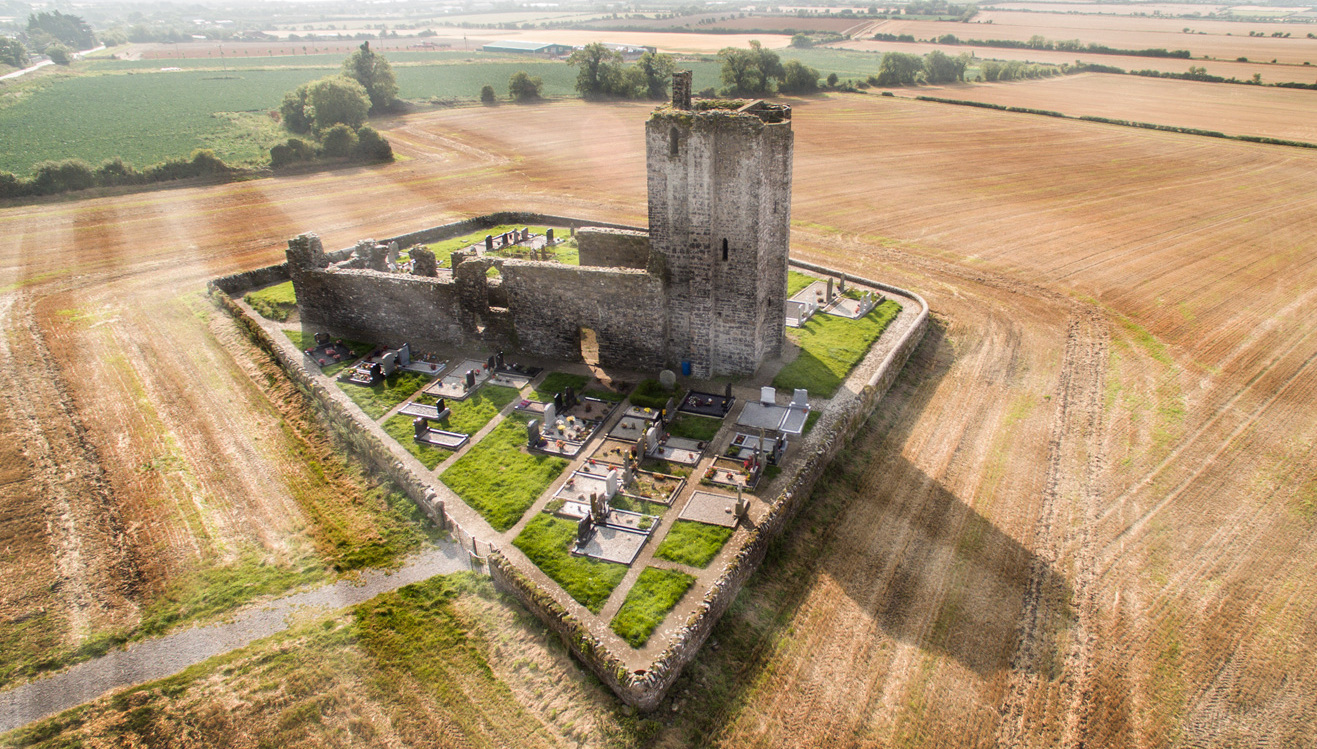

- Location within Ireland
- 53.55316°N 6.128776°W
- Location: Baldongan Close, Skerries, County Dublin
- Country: Ireland
- Denomination: Pre-Reformation Catholic

History
- Founded: 13th century

Architecture
- Style: Norman
- Years built: 13th century

Specifications
- Length: 34 m (112 ft)
- Width: 7.5 m (25 ft)
- Height: 21 m (69 ft)
- Materials: stone

Administration
- Diocese: Dublin

National monument of Ireland
- Official name: Baldongan
- Reference no.: 310

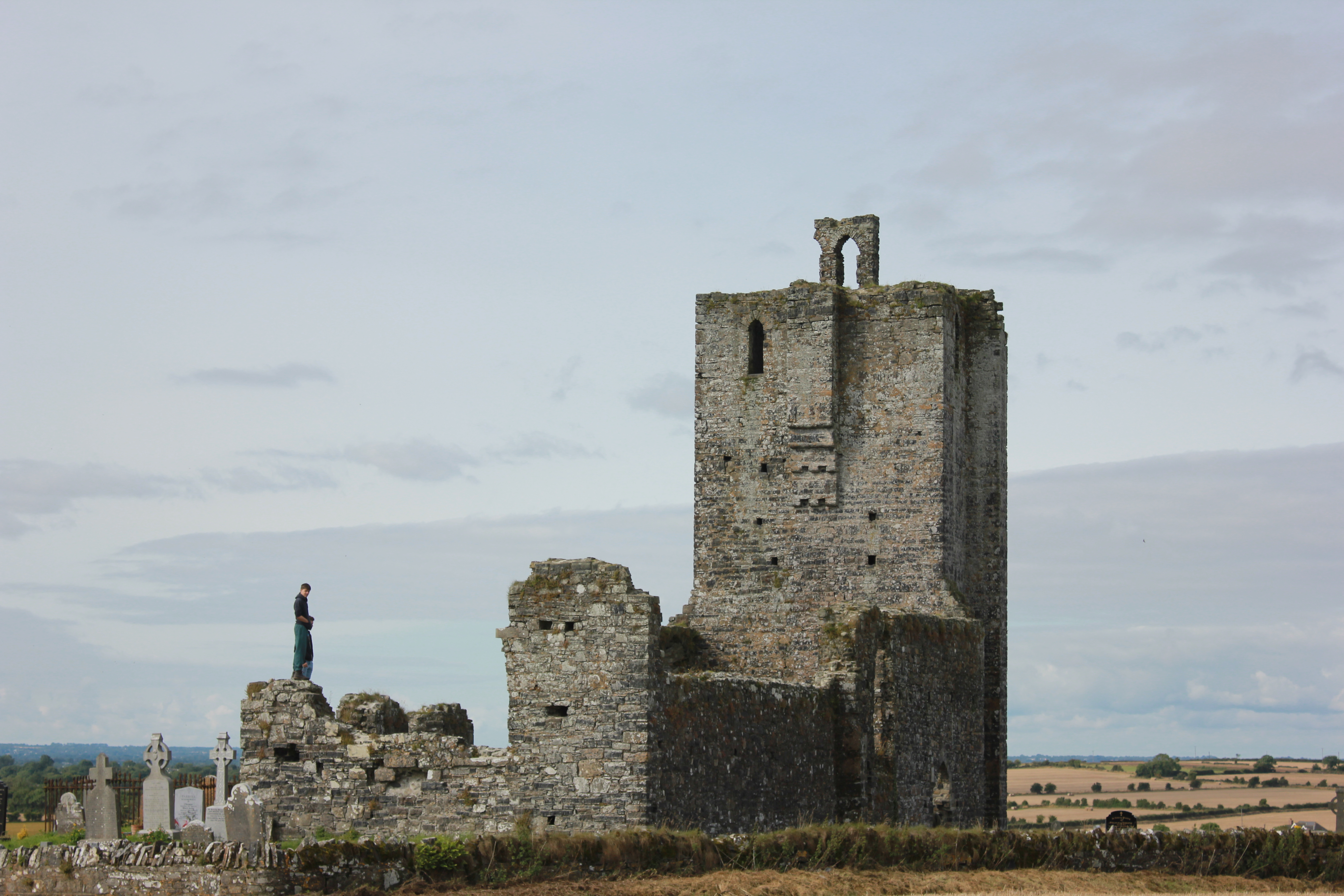
Another view of Baldongan

Baldongan Church, also called Baldungan Castle (Irish: Baile Donnagáin), is an ancient ruined church and national monument near Skerries, County Dublin, Ireland.

== Location ==
Baldongan Church lies in a rural part of north County Dublin (modern Fingal), halfway between Skerries and Lusk and 2.4 km (1.5 mi) from the seashore.

== History ==
=== First church ===
An earlier church at the site was granted to the Priory of St Mary at Kilbixy in c.1190.

=== Castle ===
Baldongan was originally the site of a fortified church, rectangular in plan with towers on each corner, constructed by the Knights Templar in the 13th century on the site of an ancient dún.

When the Templars were suppressed in 1313, the Archbishop of Dublin acquired Baldongan, and in 1350 Sir Reginald de Barnwall obtained it in trust from the Archbishop. Peter Trevers, a leading judge, owned it in the 1460s. It later passed to Richard of the de Bermingham family and then as a marriage settlement from his sister Anne to Christopher St Lawrence, 5th Baron Howth in 1508.

During the 1640s rebellion, a Confederate force held the castle until June 1642, when the Irish Royal Army under a Colonel Trafford breached the walls using cannon. The garrison then surrendered, and 200 men were put to death except for two priests, who were tortured on the rack and deported to France.

A nearby field is called the "Nuns Stood", supposedly the site from where local nuns watched the destruction of the castle. However, there is no record of any convent ever having been nearby.

The castle was said to have stood to the North or North-west of the current church however all remains above ground have now been destroyed or removed.

=== Church ===
The later church was built in the 15th century and was furnished with a 21 metre high fortified bell tower. The tower is 6.7 m (22 ft) square. The earliest visible gravestone on the site is dated the 20th of March 1735. The royal visit of 1615 reports that the church and chancel were in ruins at that time.

An illustration of the church by Francis Grose in 1791 shows the church in much the same condition as it is today and shows a bell-cote for two bells and with the Earl of Howth's arms on the front.
