= Charles Calthorpe =

English-born Crown official and judge

Sir Charles Calthorpe (c. 1540 – 1616) was an English-born Crown official and judge in Elizabethan and Jacobean Ireland. Prior to his appointment to the Irish High Court in 1606, he had been Attorney General for Ireland for more than 20 years, despite frequent criticisms of his professional incompetence. He was a close political associate of the Lord Deputy of Ireland, Sir John Perrot: Perrot's downfall damaged his career, but he was eventually restored to royal favour.

== Early life ==
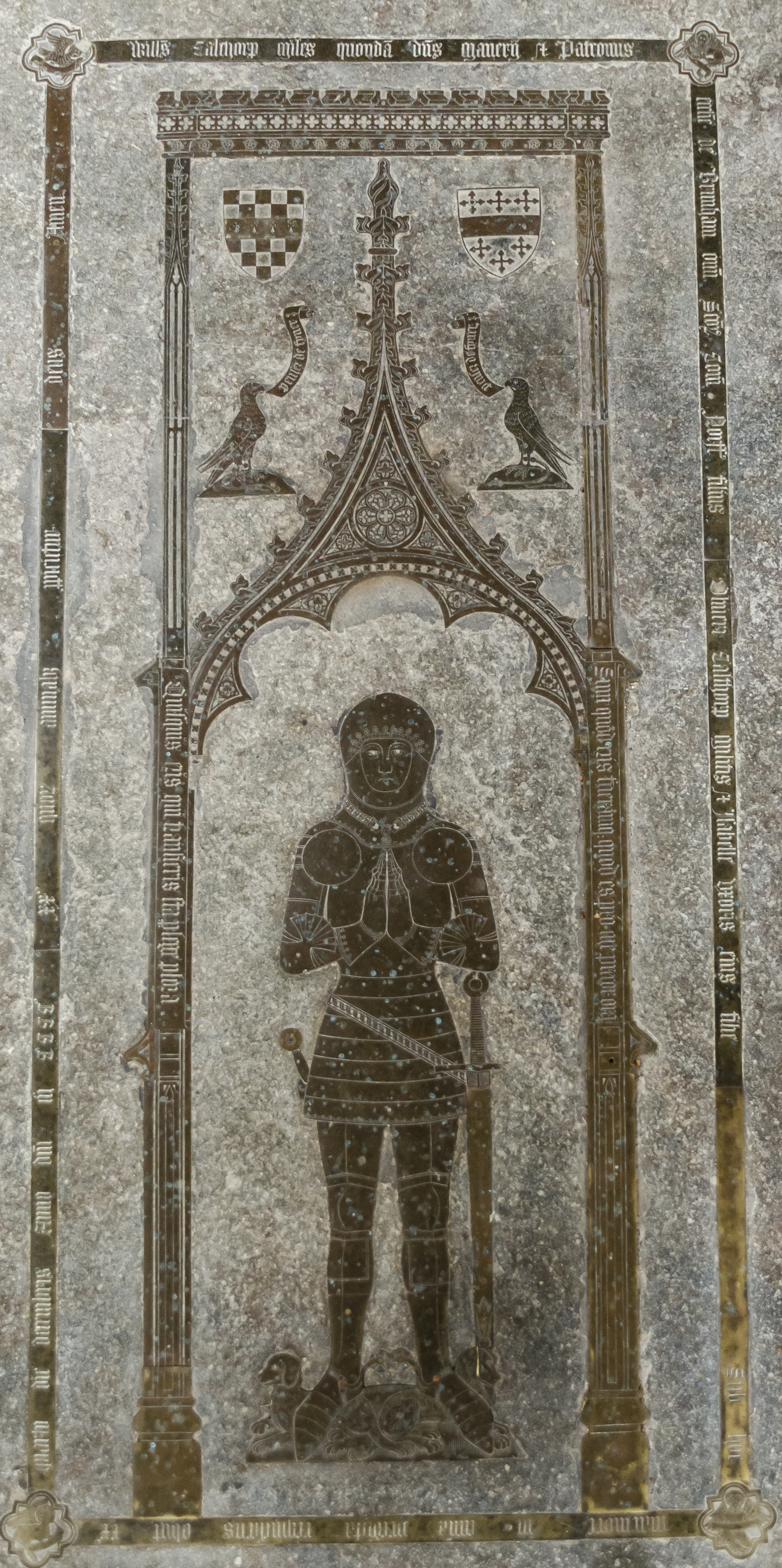
Memorial to Charles's ancestor Sir William Calthorpe (died 1420), All Saints Church, Burnham Thorpe, Norfolk

He belonged to an old Norfolk family; his father was Sir Francis Calthorpe of Hempstead and his mother was Elizabeth Berney, daughter of Ralph Berney of Gunton Hall, near Suffield. His grandfather was Sir William Calthorpe (died 1494), High Sheriff of Norfolk and Suffolk, who was probably the grandson of the earlier Sir William (died 1420) whose memorial brass can still be seen in All Saints Church, Burnham Thorpe. On their father's death in 1544 Hempstead, which had come to Charles's grandfather through his marriage to his second wife Elizabeth Stapleton, passed as to Charles's older brother William, who sold it in 1573.

The birthdate often given for Charles of 1524 is probably at least a decade too early: he was certainly described as an old man in 1611, but the Crown would hardly have retained the services of a judge who was turning 90.

Charles entered Lincoln's Inn in 1560. He gave readings on the law of copyhold at Furnivall's Inn, which were published in 1562. He was called to the bar in 1569 and became a Bencher of his Inn in 1582. He sat in the House of Commons as member for Eye in the Parliament of 1572. He also served as steward of Yarmouth and as a Justice of the Peace for Norfolk.

== Attorney General ==
In 1584 he was appointed Attorney General for Ireland, and soon became a staunch political ally of the Lord Deputy, Sir John Perrot. His rewards for his support of Perrot included a lease for 21 years of Kilconnell Abbey, County Galway, and the town of Mallow, County Cork, which he later sold.

From the outset of his career in Ireland Calthorpe was subject to intense criticism from his political opponents, who accused him of partisanship, inefficient management of business, insufficient legal learning and undue deference to his Irish colleagues. These attacks mounted after Perrot's recall in 1588, but Calthorpe managed to retain office, possibly due to the perennial difficulty in finding another suitable candidate for the office of Attorney General. Given his long tenure in that office, it may well be that he was a more efficient public servant than his critics claimed. He was also criticised for the number of prosecutions he brought in the Court of Castle Chamber, the Irish Star Chamber, which were alleged to be politically motivated attacks on Perrot's opponents or personal enemies, notably Archbishop Adam Loftus.

== Family ==
Calthorpe married firstly Winifred Toto, daughter of the celebrated Italian-born painter Anthony Toto, who was Serjeant Painter to Henry VIII and Edward VI. In 1594 she was already said to be in failing health; she died in 1605. He married secondly Dorothy Deane, daughter of John Deane of London, who had been twice married already; she outlived him by a few months. He had no children by either marriage.

== Perrot's downfall ==
The final downfall of Calthorpe's patron, Lord Deputy Perrot, who was convicted of treason in 1592 and died in the Tower of London while awaiting execution, had major repercussions in Ireland. His close ally Nicholas White, the Master of the Rolls in Ireland, was arrested on the same charge, and like Perrot, he died in the Tower. It was widely believed that Calthorpe would suffer a similar fate. He was accused of corruption by two dubious characters: Henry Bird, a former royal clerk, and an eccentric ex-priest called Denis O'Roghan. Bird had been convicted by the Court of Castle Chamber of forging Perrot's signature on O'Roghan's evidence: Calthorpe had prosecuted the case with great vigour and there is no reason to doubt that he believed that Bird was guilty. O'Roghan however withdrew his evidence against Bird, and made charges of treason against Perrot. Sir William Fitzwilliam, the new Lord Deputy, set up an inquiry, but O'Roghan's charges were so wildly implausible that it seemed doubtful whether the inquiry could proceed. A second commission of inquiry was then set up into the manner in which the charges were made. Calthorpe sat on this commission, which proved to be a serious mistake when O'Roghan accused the commissioners of subjecting him to torture.

Fitzwilliam was now ordered by the English Crown to resume his own inquiry, and Calthorpe faced two serious charges: of wrongly pressing for Bird's conviction, and of acting corruptly in the examination of O'Roghan. He was suspended from office without pay between 1590 and 1592, and it was widely believed that he would be prosecuted. In February 1591, seeing that Perrot was doomed, he wrote to Burghley, the English elder statesman, pleading for his protection. Given that Burghley was a close associate of Fitzwilliam, he might seem an unlikely patron of Calthorpe, but Calthorpe was also an old friend of Burghley, who was generally inclined to moderation. In the event, it was decided that a severe censure of Calthorpe's conduct, finding that he had been "negligent, but not undutiful" was a sufficient penalty. His efforts to claim his arrears of salary however were firmly rebuffed. Calthorpe also suffered the embarrassment of seeing the conviction of Henry Bird publicly reversed. He was restored to office in the autumn of 1592, but his reputation never fully recovered. He wisely kept a low profile in public affairs thereafter.

== Molyneux case ==
In 1594 the Court of Exchequer (Ireland) was asked to rule on whether Sir Thomas Molyneux, the Chancellor of the Exchequer of Ireland, was eligible for public office. Molyneux, though of English parentage, had been born and raised in Calais and lived for some years in Bruges, where he married a Belgian wife. His enemies accordingly suggested that he was a foreigner and a Roman Catholic. Calthorpe, having questioned Molyneux, informed the Court that he was a Protestant Englishman, and as such fully qualified to hold public office.

== Later life ==
Complaints about his inefficiency mounted: in 1597 the Privy Council of Ireland lamented that none of the Law Officers, except the Solicitor-General for Ireland, Roger Wilbraham, did the Crown's business properly. Calthorpe began pressing for promotion to what he no doubt hoped would be the less stressful life of a High Court judge. He was offered the position of Chief Justice of Munster, but refused it: the work of that office was extremely onerous, and clearly, it did not appeal to him, especially as both he and his wife were in poor health. He sought the office of Chief Justice of the Irish Common Pleas instead. On hearing that the salary of that office was about to be reduced he withdrew his application. In his later years, he seems to have seriously neglected his duties at the Attorney General's Office: in 1604 he was living in London, and the following year Sir Arthur Chichester, the new Lord Deputy, complained of Calthorpe's inefficiency, although he was given a knighthood the same year. Finally the decision to appoint Sir John Davies as Attorney General made it necessary either to find another job for Calthorpe or to forcibly retire him, and in 1606 he, at last, reached the Bench as a puisne judge of the Court of Common Pleas (Ireland). Despite having sought promotion, he again complained about the inadequate salary.

He was not a success as a judge: in 1611 he was described as old, weak and unable to perform his official duties, although he remained on the Bench until his death. He died in January 1616 and was buried in Christ Church Cathedral, Dublin.

== Reputation ==
Calthorpe was judged harshly in his own time, but he has been viewed more favourably by recent historians. As Crawford points out the whole judicial process leading to the disgrace of Sir John Perrot was politically partisan, and Calthorpe, as one of Perrot's closest allies, could not have hoped to escape censure even if he was blameless. Despite the abuse heaped on him, it is notable that he retained office as Attorney General for 22 years, and even allowing that a suitable replacement may have been hard to find until the advent of Sir John Davies this suggests that he was a competent enough Law Officer. Casey also praises him for his constructive and business-like management of the Attorney General's office, although Chichester's criticisms, and the complaints by the Privy Council about his inefficiency in 1597, suggest that he neglected his duties in his later years. This neglect was largely due to age and ill health.

== Sources ==
- Ball, F. Elrington (1926), The Judges in Ireland 1221-1921 Volume 1, London: John Murray
- Casey, James (1995), The Irish Law Officers, Dublin: Round Hall Press
- Crawford Jon G. (2006), A Star Chamber Court for Ireland-the Court of Castle Chamber 1571-1641, Dublin: Four Courts Press

Legal offices
Preceded by Edmund or Edward Butler	Attorney-General for Ireland; 1584-1606	Succeeded by Sir John Davys or Davies
