= St. Mary's Abbey, Dublin =

Former Cistercian abbey in Dublin

St. Mary's Abbey
- Mainistir Mhuire
- St Marys' Abbey - axonometric model on urban quarter (in red: the preserved Chapter House)

- Location within Central Dublin

Monastery information
- Order: Order of Saint Benedict (846–1139); Congregation of Savigny (1139–1147); Cistercian Order (1147–1539)
- Established: AD 846
- Disestablished: 1539
- Dedication: Mary, mother of Jesus
- Diocese: Dublin

People
- Founder: Máel Sechnaill mac Máele Ruanaid
- Abbot: Walter Champfleur (c.1468-99), John Orum (1499-?)

Architecture
- Functional status: Museum
- Heritage designation: National Monument
- Style: Cistercian

Site
- Location: Abbey Street, Dublin, Ireland
- Coordinates: 53°20′51″N 6°16′09″W
- Public access: yes

National monument of Ireland
- Official name: St. Mary's Abbey
- Reference no.: 401

St. Mary's Abbey (Irish: Mainistir Mhuire) was a former Cistercian abbey located near the junction of Abbey Street and Capel Street in Dublin, Ireland. Its territory stretched from the district known as Oxmanstown down along the River Liffey until it met the sea. It also owned large estates in other parts of Ireland. It was one of several liberties that existed in Dublin since the arrival of the Anglo-Normans in the 12th century, which gave it jurisdiction over its lands.

A section from its original buildings, part of the Chapter House is still standing to this day, and can be visited on specific guided tours.

== History ==
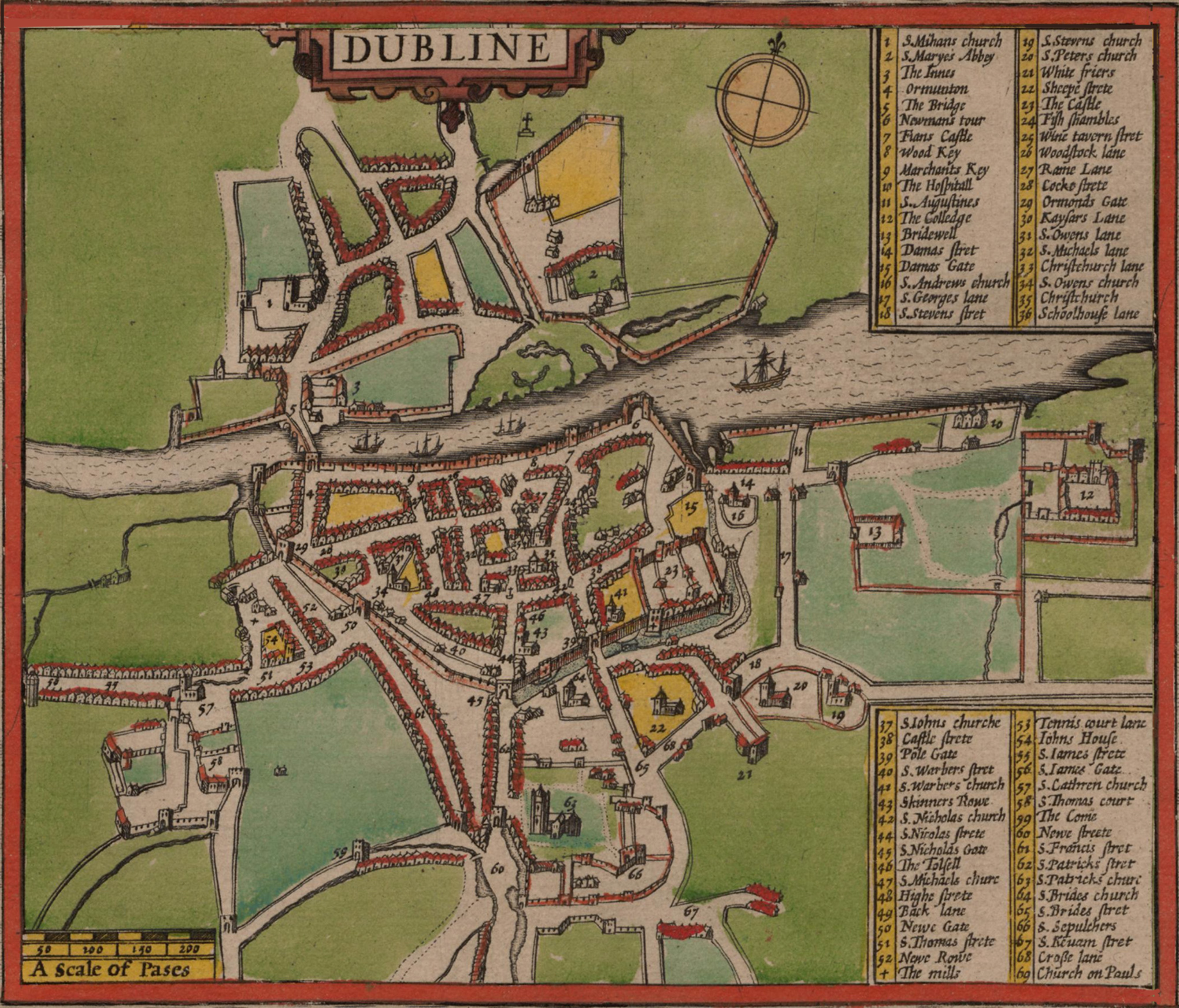
1610 map of Dublin by John Speed

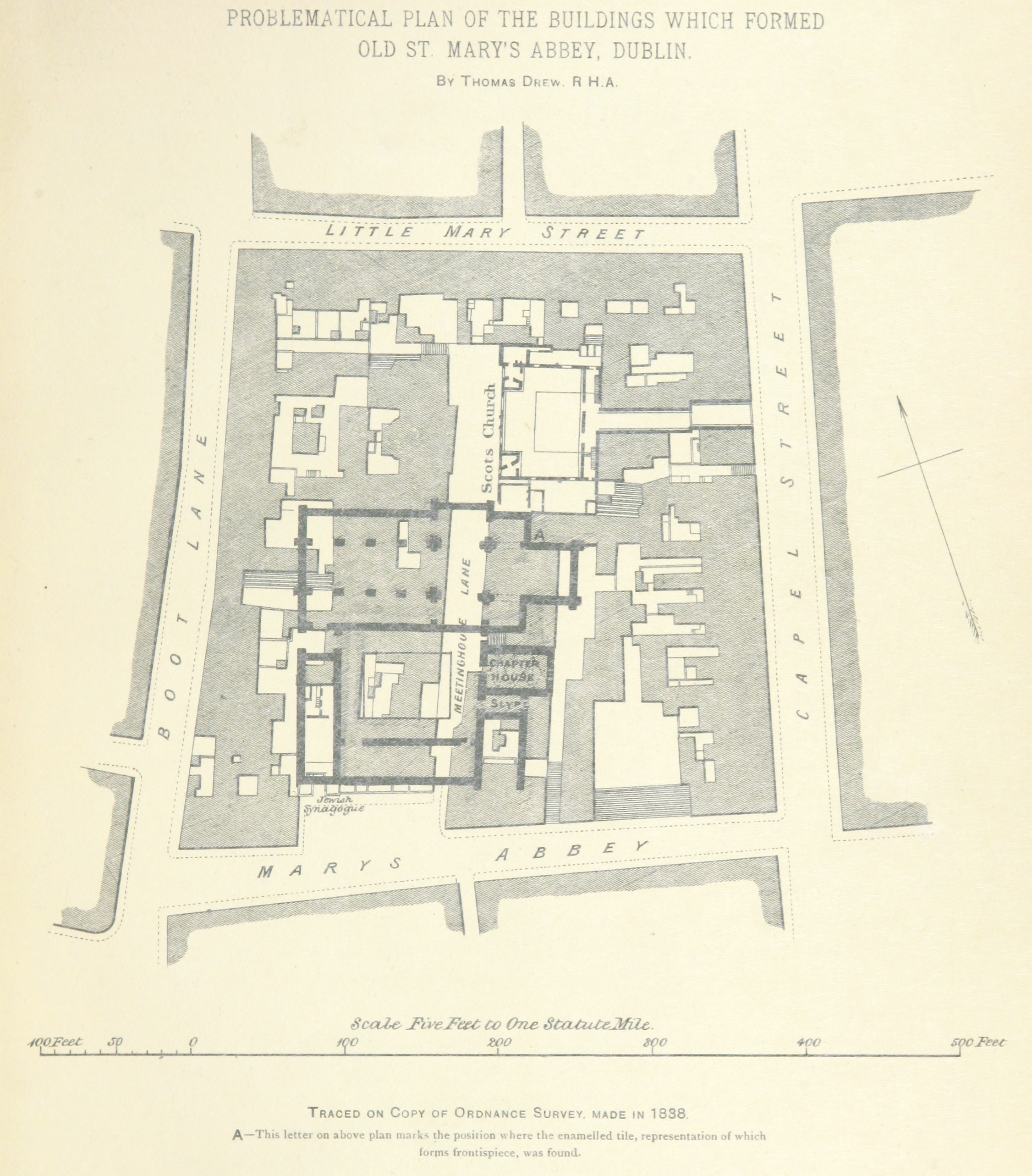
Plan of St. Mary's Abbey, Dublin (1886)

The abbey was founded by the Irish king Máel Sechnaill mac Máele Ruanaid (died 862) in 846, according to the Annals of the Four Masters. It was originally Benedictine, but in 1139 was given by Malachy O'Morga, the legate of the Pope, to monks belonging to the Congregation of Savigny, which in 1147 joined the Cistercian order.

In 1303, a great part of the abbey and church was destroyed by fire but was reconstructed. However, many of the city records and Court pleadings in the chancery stored in the abbey were destroyed. The abbey was one of the largest and richest in Ireland at that time. A series of charters and statutes of the Parliament of Ireland increased its liberties, including the right to claim goods salvaged from shipwrecks on the coast of County Dublin, and the right to deal with their lands in territories controlled by the "hostile Irish" without incurring the usual penalties.

In 1316, Robert de Nottingham, then Mayor of Dublin, attacked the abbey where the Earl of Ulster, Richard Óg de Burgh, was visiting. De Burgh was suspected of having brought Edward Bruce, who was then marching on Dublin, to Ireland. Several of de Burgh's men were killed before he was captured, and as the monks were suspected of supporting Bruce, the abbey was laid waste.

In the fifteenth century Walter Champfleur became Abbot of St Mary's in 1467, and held office for more than thirty years. He was a political figure of some importance, due partly to his close association with Thomas Butler, 7th Earl of Ormond, to whom he acted as a political and financial adviser. He was briefly Keeper of the Great Seal of Ireland in 1482–3. He died around 1498, much mourned by his Order as an "aged, prudent and learned man".

At a meeting of the Privy Council in the Chapter House, Silken Thomas started his rebellion of 1534 here, by throwing down his Sword of State.

== Burials in the abbey ==
- James Butler, 4th Earl of Ormond

== Abbey became an arsenal ==
After the Dissolution of the Monasteries in 1539 the property was given over to John Travers and the church became an arsenal and part of a quarry. The spacious lands which had been owned by the monks came in time to be let to persons who desired to build residences or places of business thereon.

== Abbey became a private residence ==
In 1619, Sir Gerald Moore of Mellifont, Drogheda, received from King James I of England a grant of the abbey, together with its tithes and lands. He later became Viscount Moore of Mellifont. The family of Moore made the Abbey their Dublin residence up to the close of the 17th century, and it was Henry Moore, 1st Earl of Drogheda, who built himself a mansion on what is now O'Connell Street and developed Henry, Moore and Earl streets.

In 1676, stone from the ruins of the Abbey was used in the building of Essex Bridge (now Grattan Bridge, leading to Parliament Street).

== Non-Conformist Chapels ==
There were two non-conformist chapels on the St. Mary's Abbey site. Meeting House Lane gets its name from the non-conformist chapel. One is known as Burghers (Capel Street) and the other is Seceders or Non-Burghers. The Capel Street Congregation, which became the Abbey Presbyterian Church now on Parnell Square, and the Union Chapel which moved in 1836 to Lower Abbey Street. The Capel Street Congregation Chapel was incorporated into Bolands Bakery, following its move to Rutland (Parnell) Square.

== Mary's Abbey Synagogue ==
Following the closure of Stafford Street Synagogue, in 1836, the congregation under Rabbi Issac Davidson, purchased the former non-conformist chapel (used by the Union Chapel before they moved to Lower Abbey Street, the sale caused a major conflict within the church) on part of the old abbey (at 12 Mary's Abbey). Davidson was succeeded as Rabbi by Julius Sandheim. The synagogue operated until 1892 when it moved to Adelaide Road.

== Abbey lands became Glasnevin Cemetery ==
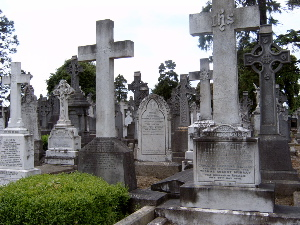
Crosses at Glasnevin Cemetery

Dr.Charles Lindsay, Dean of Christ Church Cathedral (1804–46) and afterwards Bishop of Kildare, acquired the old monastic lands of Glasnevin, which had once belonged to the abbey. These were purchased around 1832 to form what is now Glasnevin Cemetery.

== Re-discovery ==
The abbey was only rediscovered, 7 feet (2 m) underground and underneath a bakery, in the 1880s, by an amateur archaeologist. His findings were publicized by John Thomas Gilbert. Parts of the old adjoining walls can still be seen. The building is now in the care of Heritage Ireland.

The Chapter House is ordinarily open to visitors, by descending a stone staircase. It is among the oldest surviving structures in the city center of Dublin, alongside Dublin Castle, Christ Church Cathedral, St. Patrick's Cathedral, St Audeon's Church and St. Sepulchre's Palace.

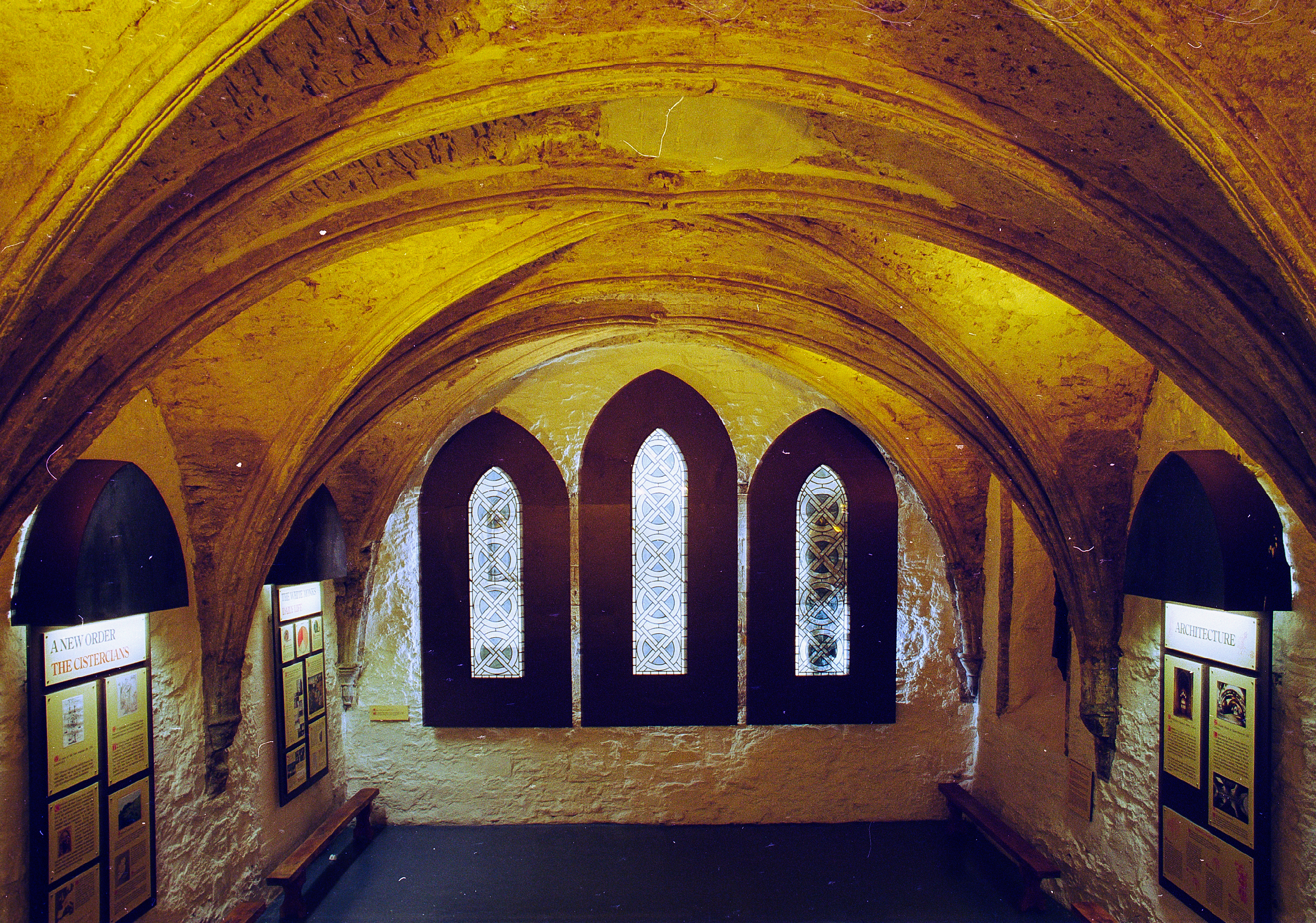
The surviving section of St. Mary's Abbey : the Chapter House (1997)

=== Recent developments ===
In 2023, as part of the excavation of the area for the construction of a hotel, the remains of over 100 skeletons dating back to the early 11th century were found on the site.

In 2014, Trinity College Dublin paid almost €250,000 for a manuscript produced at the abbey dated from 1304.

== See also ==
- List of abbeys and priories in Ireland (County Dublin)
