= Great Seal of Ireland =

National seal of the Republic of Ireland

The Great Seal of Ireland was the seal used until 1922 by the Dublin Castle administration to authenticate important state documents in Ireland, in the same manner as the Great Seal of the Realm in England. The Great Seal of Ireland was used from at least the 1220s in the Lordship of Ireland and the ensuing Kingdom of Ireland, and remained in use when the island became part of the United Kingdom of Great Britain and Ireland (1801–1922), just as the Great Seal of Scotland remained in use after the Act of Union 1707. After 1922, the single Great Seal of Ireland was superseded by the separate Great Seal of the Irish Free State and Great Seal of Northern Ireland for the respective jurisdictions created by the partition of Ireland.

== Use ==
The office of "Lord Keeper of the Great Seal of Ireland" was held by the Lord Chancellor of Ireland. The Chancellor was presented with the physical seal upon taking his oath of office, and it was otherwise kept in the Court of Chancery. When the Chancellor was absent, Lords Commissioners of the Great Seal were appointed. The seal was affixed to documents issued by the Privy Council of Ireland and its head the chief governor (latterly called the Lord Lieutenant). In the fifteenth century, the Chief Governor was generally non-resident and was represented by a Lord Deputy. The Governor or Deputy would issue a type of writ called a fiant to the Lord Chancellor, mandating the issue of a patent ("letters patent") under the Great Seal. In the fourteenth century, the Chancellor was entitled to a guard of six men-at-arms and twelve mounted archers, in part to protect the seal in his custody. When the Lord Chancellor went as a judge of assize he would take the Great Seal with him, despite constant complaints about "the dangers of the roads". If the Lord Chancellor was unable for whatever reason to transact business, the Crown might designate another senior judge to act in his place without the Great Seal. The Chief Governor was appointed in London under the Great Seal of England, but a 1498 Act allowed a vacancy to be temporarily filled by the Dublin administration under the Irish seal. This practice was applied several times in the 1690s. In the fifteenth century, the Governor was appointed under the king's privy seal and appointed his Deputy under the Irish seal. From 1700 to 1767, non-resident Lords Lieutenant were appointed under the British Great Seal, and would in turn use the Irish seal to appoint resident Lord Justices as deputies.

Before the Act of Union 1800, any bill passed by the Parliament of Ireland and approved by the Privy Council of Ireland was sent to London under the Great Seal of Ireland and, if approved by the Privy Council of England (later the Privy Council of Great Britain), was returned under the Great Seal of the Realm to be enacted. This procedure was required both under Poynings' Law (1495) and under the Constitution of 1782 which amended it. Parliament was summoned under the Great Seal of England rather than that of Ireland, even after 1782. A subsidiary change in 1782 was that judges of the Irish admiralty court were appointed under the Irish seal, not the English one.

Titles in the Peerage of Ireland were originally created under the English seal. After the Williamite War they were usually created under the Irish seal, but creations under the British seal continued, even after the Constitution of 1782, until the Act of Union 1800. Robert Raymond, 1st Baron Raymond wrote that, under the British seal, the Irish nature of the peerage had to be made explicit. Sometimes a single patent created separate titles in the Irish and English/British peerages for the same person. When Lord Thurlow faulted Lord Loughborough for creating Irish peers under the British seal, Lord Eldon said Thurlow had also done so. After the Union, the question of whether Irish peers appointed under the British seal were entitled to vote for Irish representative peers was considered by the Committee for Privileges of the House of Lords in 1805, and affirmed in 1806.

The 1289 "ordinance for the State of Ireland" forbade purveyance except by a commission under the Great Seal of Ireland. From the Tudor Reconquest, appointments to the Irish judiciary were made entirely under the Irish seal.

== History ==
An Irish chancery was established in 1232 separate from the English chancery, and all documents issued from the Irish chancery were sealed with the "great seal of the king used in Ireland". Most thirteenth-century land grants continued to be issued in England with the English seal, and then sent to the Irish chancery to be enrolled. In 1256, King Henry III granted the Lordship of Ireland to his heir, the future Edward I, and ordered that Edward's personal seal should have "royal authority" there. Henry took Ireland back from Edward in 1258. Robert de Vere, Duke of Ireland was similarly authorised to use his own great seal by Richard II in 1385; Richard ordered de Vere's seal to be broken in 1389. In the 1300s, pardons for felony were granted under both the Irish and the English seals.

In 1417, the Chancellor, Laurence Merbury, refused to authenticate with the seal a petition to the King from the Parliament on the state of Ireland. In 1423, the Chancellor Richard Talbot, archbishop of Dublin, refused to acknowledge Edward Dantsey, Bishop of Meath, as Deputy because the Governor, Edmund Mortimer, 5th Earl of March, had appointed Dantsey with his privy seal instead of the Great Seal. In July 1442, chancellor Richard Wogan fled Ireland after being accused of crimes, including stealing the Great Seal, which was soon handed over to Thomas Nortoun of St Saviour's Priory, Dublin by a person whom Nortoun refused to name to the Privy Council, citing the seal of confession. In 1460, Richard of York, under threat of arrest in England, fled to Ireland and persuaded the parliament to pass a declaration of independence stating in part that Ireland was "corporate of itself" and that "henceforth no person or persons being in the said land of Ireland shall be, by any command given or made under any other seal than the said seal of the said land, compelled to answer to any appeal or any other matter out of the said land". The Lord Deputy Gerald FitzGerald, 8th Earl of Kildare refused Edward IV's command to annul this, and it was not until Poynings' Parliament in 1495 that this was done.

In 1478, after Kildare was replaced as Lord Deputy by Henry Grey, 4th (7th) Baron Grey of Codnor, the Lord Chancellor Rowland FitzEustace, 1st Baron Portlester, who was Kildare's father-in-law, organised a campaign of non-co-operation with the new Deputy and refused to hand over the Great Seal, making the conduct of official business impossible. Kildare argued that Grey had been appointed under the privy signet instead of the Irish Great Seal. King Edward IV ordered Thomas Archbold, the Master of the Royal Mint in Ireland, to strike a new Great Seal, "as near as he could to the pattern and fabric of the other, with the difference of a rose in every part". The King decreed that the Seal held by Portlester was annulled, and that all acts passed under it were utterly void; but to no avail. So effective was the campaign of obstruction that after a few months Lord Grey was forced to return to England.

In 1484, clerk James Collynge was charged with forging the Great Seal of Ireland for a fake pardon to the treasurer of Limerick Cathedral, and outlawed unless he appeared before the Chief Justice of the Common Pleas.

One of the developments which Henry VII and the Tudor Reconquest of Ireland sought to reverse was that the Lord Deputy's private seal, kept by his secretary, was being used in place of the Great Seal of Ireland.

In 1638, Lord Chancellor Viscount Loftus refused to kneel before Lord Deputy Thomas Wentworth when delivering the Great Seal to him, contributing to the breakdown in their relationship. In 1662, the fee to the Lord Chancellor for patents under the Great Seal was increased to 10 shillings sterling per patentee. The 1722 patent for Wood's halfpence was issued under the British seal rather than the Irish, which was among the complaints Jonathan Swift made in his Drapier's Letters condemning the currency.

During a lawsuit between the Marquess of Donegall and the Irish Society over fishing rights in Lough Neagh, Viscount Pery argued that the Society's 1662 charter was invalid as it was made under the English seal rather than the Irish one; the Irish Parliament passed an act in 1795 validating all land grants made under the English seal. The Constitution of 1782 removed the role of the British great seal in Irish legislation. Napper Tandy of the Society of United Irishmen challenged his 1792 arrest on the grounds that government officials, from the Lord Lieutenant down, had been appointed under the British rather than the Irish seal. This was intended not to persuade the judges, who vehemently rejected the argument, but to increase public sympathy.

The Act of Union 1800 provided that the Great Seal of Ireland could continue to be used in Ireland, and that at elections to the Westminster parliament for constituencies in Ireland, the writs and certified returns would be under the Irish rather than the British seal. In 1826–7, when Sir William MacMahon as Master of the Rolls in Ireland had a dispute with the Lord Chancellor of Ireland, he appealed to the Home Secretary in London rather than the Lord Lieutenant in Dublin on the ground that his appointment as Master of the Rolls was under the British seal rather than the Irish one.

== Design ==
External images
- Rare 14th-century seal of Richard II
- 1793 seal reverse on letters patent establishing Dunsink Observatory for Royal Astronomer of Ireland
- 1852 seal obverse on inventor's patent for Thomas Conolly
- Seal purse of James Campbell, Lord Chancellor 1917–1921

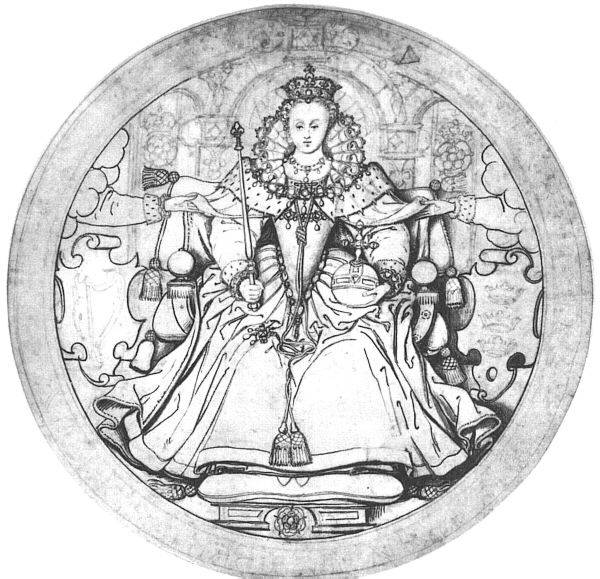
Unused sketch by Nicholas Hilliard for an Irish Great Seal. Escutcheons beside Elizabeth I show the harp (left) and three crowns (right), successive arms of Ireland.

A new seal was created for each new monarch, whose likeness would be on the obverse. (On the accession of Richard II in 1377, the seal of Edward III was re-used to save money, with only the king's name being updated.) The seal included the arms of Ireland: until 1536, three crowns; after that, an Irish harp. Oliver Cromwell's Great Seal for Ireland, cast by Thomas Simon in 1655, was similar to Simon's 1653 Great Seal for the Protectorate, with the view of London on the obverse replaced by one of Dublin, and the quartered arms on the reverse replaced with the Irish arms, still with Cromwell's arms inescutcheoned. From Queen Victoria on, the Great Seal of Ireland had the same design as the Great Seal of the Realm except for the replacement, under the figure on the reverse, of Britannia's trident with the Irish crowned harp. James Roderick O'Flanagan described the contemporary seal in 1870:

The Great Seal has on the obverse the Queen seated upon the throne crowned, bearing the ball and sceptre, with Justice on one side and Religion on the other. On the lower portion are the royal arms; a rich border surrounds the seal. On the reverse is the Queen on horseback, the horse fully caparisoned, with a plume of ostrich feathers floating from the headstall, led by a page bare-headed. On the rest for the equestrian figure is a harp surrounded by shamrocks, and around the margin of the seal are the words, each divided from the other by a rose and rose leaves,

VICTORIA DEI GRATIA BRITANNIARUM REGINA FIDEI DEFENSOR.

The seal matrix was cast in silver and the impressions made in sealing wax. Irish Great Seals are attested from the thirteenth century, though surviving impressions of them are rare. Most state papers were destroyed, in multiple fires between 1304 and 1758, and in an explosion in the Battle of Dublin in 1922. According to Hilary Jenkinson, "a fairly intensive search some years [before 1954] in England and Ireland for impressions of the Irish Seals produced a total of only forty, for the period from the thirteenth century [to 1800]".

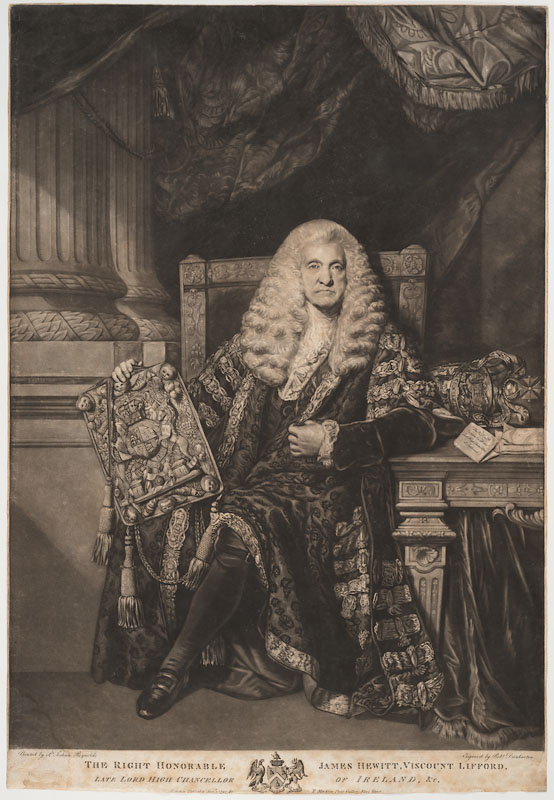
Viscount Lifford as Lord Chancellor of Ireland holding the seal purse

On formal occasions, the seal was carried in a large ornamental purse. At the State Opening of the Irish Parliament the purse also held the speech from the throne delivered by the Lord Lieutenant in the Irish House of Lords chamber. (John Beresford, official purse-bearer at the time of the Union, received £91 annually in compensation for the loss of fees resulting from the abolition of the Parliament.) Displayed purses include a Georgian one in the National Museum of Ireland; a Victorian one in the State Heraldic Museum; and James Campbell's, donated (Note: By Vivienne Orme, widow of James Campbell's grandson Patrick Campbell, 3rd Baron Glenavy.) in 1991 to the Bank of Ireland for display in the former Lords chamber.

=== Decommissioning ===
The seal matrix was replaced when it was worn out and when a new monarch acceded to the throne. Once the new seal was ready, the old one was broken up or, latterly, "damasked" (ceremonially defaced) with a hammer. For example, George IV became king on 29 January 1820 and was crowned on 19 July 1821, and on 4 February 1822, a new Irish seal with his image was presented to him at a British Privy Council meeting in Carlton House, London, and he made an order in council that it replace the old seal. On 12 February, Robert Peel, the Home Secretary, sent the seal to Marquess Wellesley, the Lord Lieutenant, with a covering letter. On 18 February, at an Irish Privy Council meeting in Dublin Castle, the letter was read, "Whereupon, the Right Honorable Thomas Lord Manners, Lord Chancellor of Ireland, delivered the Old Seal into the Hands of His Excellency [Wellesley], who directed that it should be defaced, in obedience to His Majesty's Commands; and the Old Seal having been defaced accordingly, His Excellency delivered the New Seal into the Hands of the Right Honorable the Lord Chancellor."

A custom beginning with Nicholas Bacon in England and soon extending to Ireland was that the Keeper of the Seal could melt down the decommissioned seal to make silverware, most often a so-called "Seal Cup". Lord Chancellor archbishop Adam Loftus made at least two Seal Cups for Rathfarnham Castle from Great Seals of Elizabeth I. (Note: One dated 1593 was sold in 1960 by the 7th Marquess of Ely to the Ulster Museum. One dated to 1604 owned by the 4th Earl of Desart was displayed in Dublin in 1872. One dated 1604 was sold in 1902 to J. Pierpont Morgan. Scantlebury says three were made after Elizabeth's death in 1603.) A monteith now in the Art Institute of Chicago was made in 1703 from the silver in both Sir Richard Cox's great seal and his seal of the Common Pleas, weighing 100 ounces (2,800 g) and 25 ounces (710 g) respectively.

The 1902 seal of Edward VII, which passed to Redmond Barry on the king's demise, was sold at auction in 1969 for £750, and is now in the National Museum of Ireland. It has a diameter of 6.4 inches (160 mm) and weighs 271 ounces (7,700 g).

== Supersession ==
The Government of Ireland Act 1920 abolished the office of Lord Chancellor of Ireland and transferred custody of the seal from him to the Lord Lieutenant on 27 June 1921. The physical seal was in the Crown and Hanaper Office in the Four Courts when that was occupied by the Irish Republican Army on 14 April 1922 in the buildup to the Civil War. Under British law the writs for the Irish Free State election of 16 June 1922 had to be passed under the Great Seal, so on 22 May an order in council was passed to authorise substitution of a duplicate seal stored in the Royal Mint. The explosion in the Four Courts during the Battle of Dublin was initially assumed to have destroyed the Great Seal, but it was later found in the rubble. The 1920 act intended the Great Seal of Ireland to be used by both Northern Ireland and Southern Ireland. Judges were appointed in 1921 and 1922 to Northern Ireland courts by letters patent under the Great Seal of Ireland. Several writs for the Westminster election of 15 November 1922 were burnt by republicans in Dublin when sent from Northern Ireland to be sealed.

The Great Seal of Ireland became obsolete on 6 December 1922, with the coming into force of the Constitution of the Irish Free State. Under the Irish Free State (Consequential Provisions) Act 1922 a separate Great Seal of Northern Ireland was created. The letters patent appointing the first Governor of Northern Ireland allowed him to use his private seal until the Great Seal was ready. Although the Free State Constitution did not mention any seal, the letters patent appointing its first Governor-General mandated use of a Great Seal of the Irish Free State, with interim provision for use of the Governor-General's private seal. The Free State Great Seal was delivered in 1925 to a design agreed by the Executive Council. In 1927, Lord Birkenhead said he supposed the obsolete pre-1922 Great Seal was in the possession of the Free State Executive Council. However, when the Free State came into being on 6 December 1922, Gerald Horan, outgoing Clerk of the Crown and Hanaper, informed Hugh Kennedy, the incoming Attorney General of Ireland, that "he had handed over the Great Seal of Ireland to the 'Imperial Representative' [i.e. Governor-General Tim Healy] at the Viceregal Lodge but was retaining the 'former' Great Seal". This former seal, of George V, comprised two silver matrices weighing 200 ounces (5,700 g). In January 1926, Horan donated it to the National Museum of Ireland.
