= Patrick Cogley =

Irish Crown official, landowner and judge

Patrick Cogley, or Cogle (died after 1470) was an Irish Crown official, landowner and judge of the fifteenth century.

He is first heard of in 1461, when he was appointed Master of the Rolls in Ireland, at a salary of 10 marks a year, but he stepped down from that office after only three months when he was appointed Clerk of the Crown and Hanaper, or Chief Clerk in Chancery, (the Mastership of the Rolls, though a judicial position, was probably at that early stage the less important office of the two), at a salary of 10 marks a year. He was replaced as Master by Peter Trevers. He was at the same time appointed Clerk of the Parliaments in Ireland and Clerk to the Great Council of Ireland. He was still Clerk of the Crown in 1470. He was also Chief Chamberlain of the Exchequer of Ireland. He was a clerk in holy orders but apparently did not hold any high clerical office.

In 1470 King Edward IV granted him by letters patent certain lands which were not clearly specified; the Irish Parliament by statute confirmed that the grant was for life (the statute was not repealed until 2007).
