= William Archbold =

Irish royal

William Archbold (died after 1400) was a senior official in the household of three Kings of England. He was an Irishman, and later returned to Ireland, where he became a judge. The Archbolds were a Dublin family who had been early Anglo-Norman settlers in Ireland.

William was living in England, and a member of the Royal Household, by 1369; he became an esquire of the body by 1373, and later the King's sewer, a senior official who oversaw the royal kitchens. He became Keeper of a royal forest, the Forest of Braydon in Wiltshire, in 1374. He also became Keeper of Vardon Park, in present-day Wootton Bassett.

He had returned to Ireland by 1378 when he became a Baron of the Court of Exchequer (Ireland). He became Second Engrosser (copier) of the Exchequer of Ireland in 1386.

Despite his age, his record of royal service makes it likely that he was the William Archbold who was appointed Keeper of the fortress of Newcastle McKynegan, near Newcastle, County Wicklow, in 1400. Five of those who stood sureties for his good behaviour were named Archbold. Their relationship to William is uncertain, but he did have descendants, including Thomas Archbold, also known as Thomas Galmole (died after 1506), who was both a judge and Master of the Royal Mint in Ireland.

== Sources ==
- Ball, F. Elrington The Judges in Ireland 1221-1921 London John Murray 1926
- Smyth, Constantine Joseph Chronicle of the Law Officers of Ireland London Butterworths 1839
