= Nicholas Sutton (lawyer) =

Irish judge (c.1440 – 1478)

Nicholas Sutton (c. 1440 – 1478) was an Irish judge of the fifteenth century, who held the offices of Attorney General for Ireland and Baron of the Court of Exchequer (Ireland). His career demonstrates how small the Irish legal world was at the time: his father held the same two offices, while his widow married his successor as Baron of the Court of Exchequer. His will, which no longer exists, has been described as being full of "curious details".

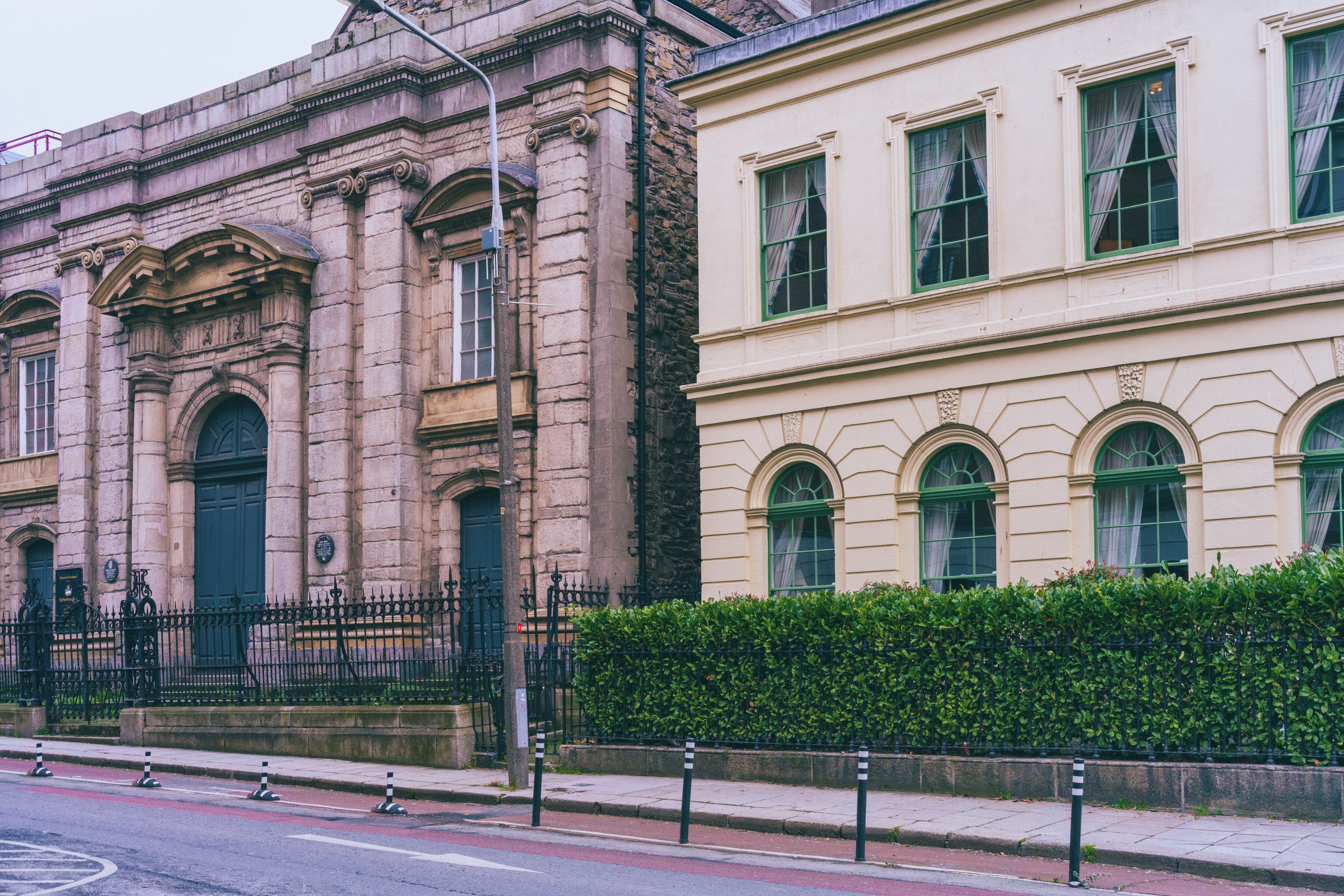
Werburgh Street, where the Sutton family lived, present day

He was born in Dublin, probably at Werburgh Street, where his family had a townhouse; he was buried in the churchyard adjoining Werburgh Street. His father was William Sutton, who was Attorney General in about 1444 and then served on the Bench for many years a Baron of the Exchequer; his mother was Alison Darby.

He was appointed Attorney General by the Parliament of Ireland in the session of 1471/2, and was appointed as a Baron of the Exchequer by the Parliament of 1472-3, joining his father on the Court. Nicholas however died in 1478, two years before his father, and was buried in St. Werburgh's Church, Dublin.

Elrington Ball states that Nicholas's will, of which Ball had seen a copy which no longer survives, was a curious document, which showed evidence of religious fervour which was extraordinary even by the standards of the age. Nicholas called himself a "clerk", which was the normal contemporary term for a celibate clergyman, but an unusual way for a married man to describe himself. Should he have no other heirs, his lands were to be divided between St Werburgh's and St. Mary's Abbey, Dublin. He left a legacy to his father, William, in return for his blessing, and numerous legacies to religious houses and to charity.

He had children by his marriage to Anne Cusacke; in his will he commended his family to the care of Philip Bermingham, the Lord Chief Justice of Ireland, while their education was entrusted to Walter Champfleur, the Abbot of St. Mary's, who was also named executor. A year after his death, Anne remarried his successor on the Court of Exchequer, Patrick Burnell, a member of the well-known Burnell family which produced a number of leading judges and politicians.
