= Henry Mitchell (Irish judge) =

Irish judge (c. 1320–1384)

Henry Mitchell (c.1320–1384) was an Irish judge of the fourteenth century. He was one of the first recorded holders of the office of Attorney General for Ireland, and was subsequently Chief Baron of the Irish Exchequer and Chief Justice of the Irish Common Pleas.

He was born in Killeek, County Dublin, son of John Mitchell. He is recorded as living in England in 1344: he was probably studying law there, as Ireland then had no law school. From 1372 to 1376 he was Attorney General for Ireland, with a salary of £1 and 1 shilling, and authority to practice in the Court of Exchequer (Ireland) and the Court of Common Pleas (Ireland), a common limitation on the Attorney's power at the time. In 1372 he and Roger Hawkenshaw, the Escheator of Ireland, appeared as expert witnesses at a lawsuit in Kilkenny before the Court of King's Bench (Ireland), where Philip Overy claimed possession of certain lands allegedly left to him by Thomas le Botiller. In 1374 the Crown ordered an extra payment to him of 33 shillings for arguing the pleas before the Court of Common Pleas, and before the Lord Treasurer of Ireland presiding in the Exchequer.

He sat in the Irish House of Commons in the Parliament of 1375. In the same year he and John FitzRery, the new Escheator of Ireland, were ordered to collect the King's debts. He held office briefly as an ordinary Baron of the Exchequer in 1376, and as Chief Baron of the Irish Exchequer in 1376-7, and was then transferred to the Court of Common Pleas (Ireland) as its Chief Justice. His predecessor Robert Preston, 1st Baron Gormanston, was removed from office at his own request, "unless the King or Privy Council of Ireland should order otherwise"; Preston apparently retired voluntarily due to advancing age. He was ordered to deliver to his successor all records relating to the office. Mitchell died in 1384. He was probably not "one Henry Mitchell" who in that year had Peter Rhys outlawed by the Court of Common Pleas: this was a common legal remedy at the time for non-payment of a debt.
