= Purse Bearer =

Official in the UK Royal Household

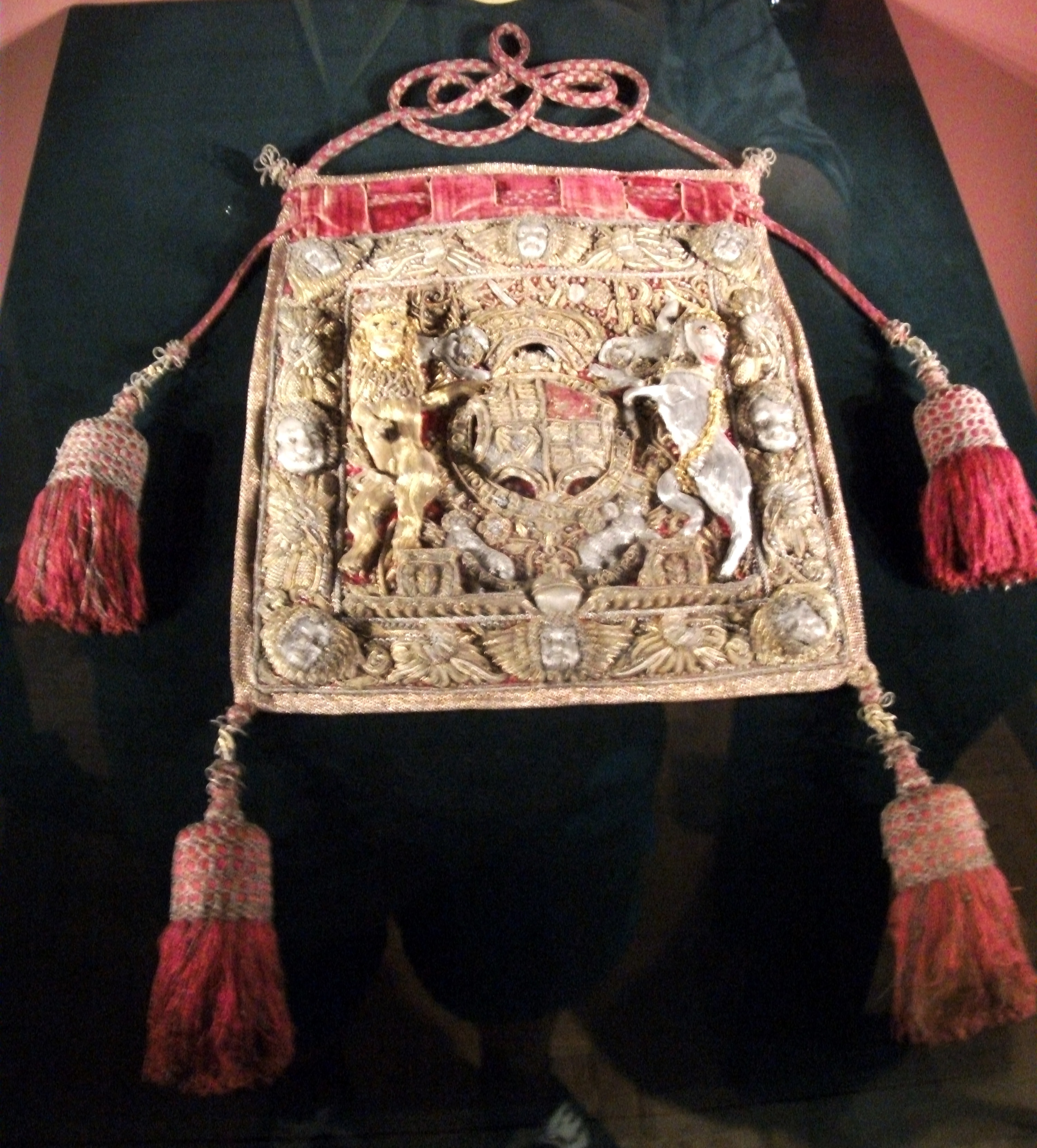
Purse at Weston Park, used by Sir Orlando Bridgeman, Bt, who was Lord Keeper of the Great Seal, 1667–72

The Purse bearer is an official in the Royal Households of the United Kingdom, and based in the Ministry of Justice.

The use of a special purse or burse to hold the Great Seal of the Realm, the Lord Chancellor's symbol of Office, can be traced as far back as the end of the 13th Century. The purse is solemnly carried before the Lord Chancellor in procession on State occasions.

It no longer contains the Great Seal which now reposes at the Palace of Westminster; it is however used by the Lord Chancellor to convey the signed copy of the King's Speech printed on vellum, from the King's Robing Room to the steps of the Throne in the Chamber of the House of Lords, at every State Opening of Parliament.

The Purse presently in use is made from crimson velvet and lavishly embellished with the Royal Arms and Emblems.
