= Engrossing =

Engrossing may refer to:

- Engrossing (law) – marketing offences in English common law
- The process of preparing an engrossed bill in a legislature
- Illuminated manuscript production and design processes

== See also ==
- Enrolled bill
- International Association of Master Penmen, Engrossers and Teachers of Handwriting
