= Significavit =

Significavit (Latin: 'he has signified') is an obsolete writ in English, Welsh and Irish ecclesiastical law, issued out of chancery, that a man be excommunicated for forty days, and imprisoned until he submits himself to the authority of the church. It is synonymous with the writ de excommunicate capiendo.
