= Dedimus potestatem =

In law, dedimus potestatem (Latin for "we have given the power") is a writ whereby commission is given to one or more private persons for the expedition of some act normally performed by a judge. It is also called delegatio. It is granted most commonly upon the suggestion that a party, who is to do something before a judge or in a court, is too weak to travel.

The grant has various uses, such as to take a personal answer to a bill in chancery, to examine witnesses, levy a fine, etc.
