= Attorney-General for Ireland =

Senior legal officer in Ireland prior to 1921

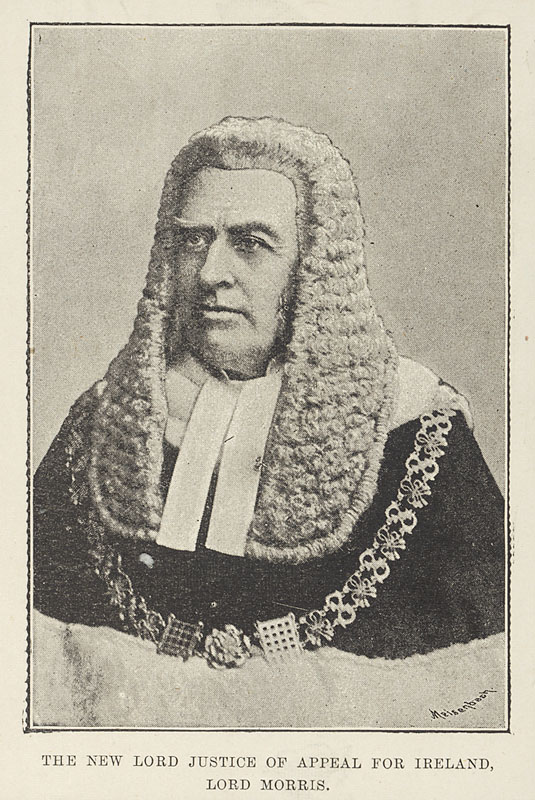
Michael Morris, later Lord Killanin, Attorney-General for Ireland from 1866 to 1867

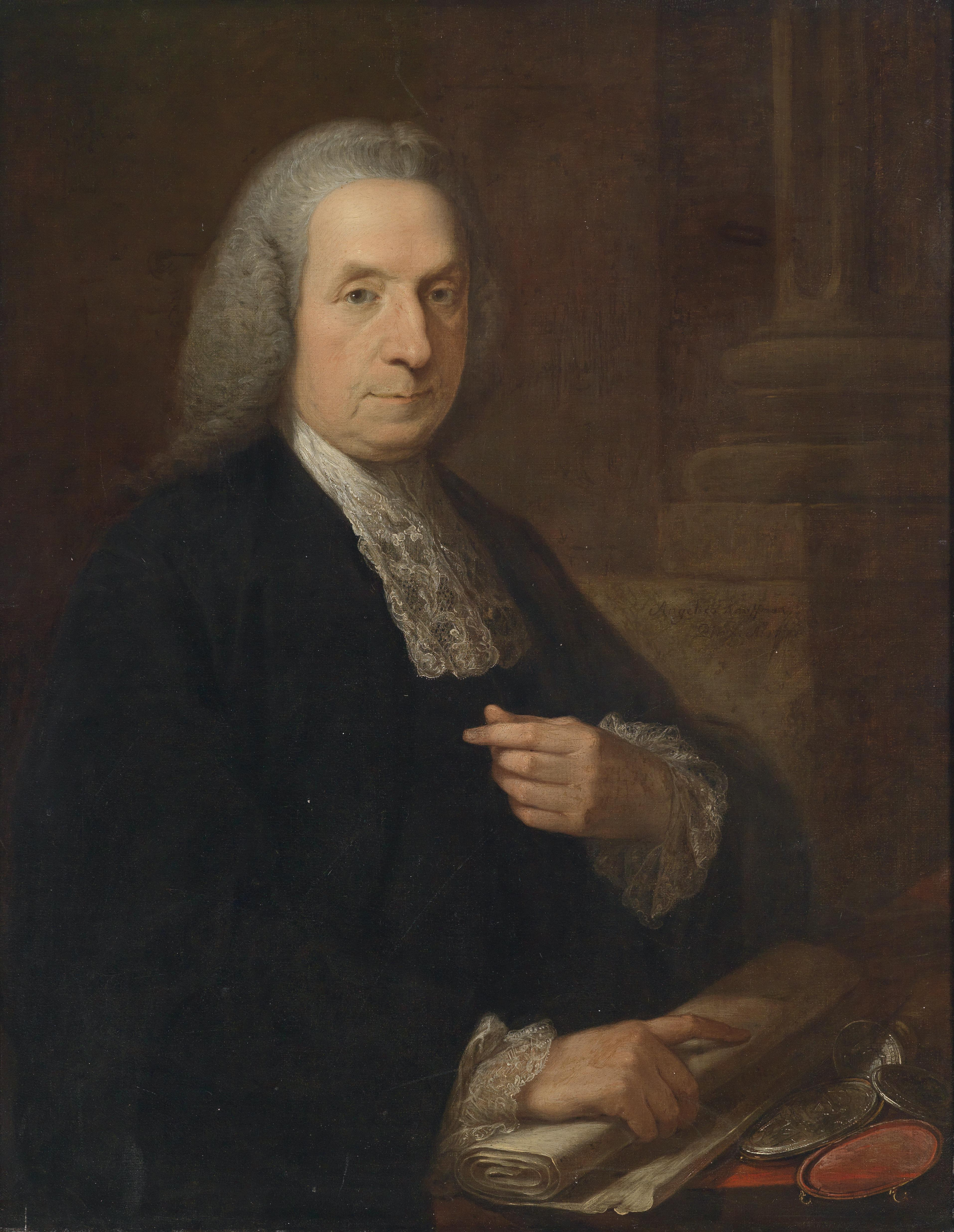
Philip Tisdall, Attorney-General for Ireland from 1760 to 1777, portrait by Angelica Kauffmann

The Attorney-General for Ireland was an Irish and then, from 1801 under the Acts of Union 1800, United Kingdom government office-holder. He was senior in rank to the Solicitor-General for Ireland: both advised the Crown on Irish legal matters. With the establishment of the Irish Free State in 1922, the duties of the Attorney-General and Solicitor-General for Ireland were taken over by the Attorney General of Ireland. The office of Solicitor-General for Ireland was abolished at the same time for reasons of economy. This led to repeated complaints from the first Attorney General of Ireland, Hugh Kennedy, about the "immense volume of work" which he was now forced to deal with single-handedly.

== History of the office ==
The first record of the office of Attorney General for Ireland, some 50 years after the equivalent office was established in England, is in 1313, when Richard Manning or Mannyn was appointed King's Attorney, or "King's Serjeant who follows the pleas" (the title Attorney General was not used until the 1530s), at a salary of 5 marks a year. The Attorney General was initially junior to the serjeant-at-law, but since the titles King's Serjeant and King's Attorney were often used interchangeably, as in the case of Richard Manning, it can be difficult to establish who held which office at any given time. Thomas Dowdall, for example, like Manning before him, was called Serjeant-at-law and King's Attorney in the 1460s at almost the same time. Early holders of the office, including Manning, were permitted to take private clients. Manning is on record as acting as attorney for Meiler Kendal in 1310, prior to his appointment as Attorney-General. Casey states that the records cast very little light on the duties of the Attorney-General in the early years, possibly a reflection of his inferior status compared to the Serjeant-at-law.

There are at least two references to a Deputy Attorney-General. The first was in 1385, when Robert Hemynborough, or de Hemynborgh, was appointed Attorney-General "with power to appoint a Deputy". Two centuries later, Edward Butler, who became Attorney-General in 1582, had acted as deputy from 1578 to 1580. Apart from these two examples, there is no evidence that the Deputy Attorney-General was a permanent position, nor do we know why it was considered necessary to appoint Butler to this office (pressure of work may be the explanation).

The early Attorneys-General might be licensed to appear in certain courts only. William Rouse (1342), Peter de Leycestre (1357), William Lynnoor (1359), Henry Mitchell (1372) and John Barry (1401) were all given a patent to plead in the Court of Common Pleas and the Court of Exchequer. John White was described in 1426 as "King's Attorney in the King's Bench and the Exchequer". Robert le Hore in 1379 was appointed King's Attorney to plead "before the justices of the Bench (this was not the Couurt of Bench but an early name for the Court of Common Pleas) and the Treasurer and chamberlains of the Exchequer". In 1499 Clement Fitzleones, less typically, was appointed "King's Attorney in all Courts". The Serjeant-at-law, by contrast, was generally licensed to appear in all the royal courts, although John Haire in 1392 was described as "Serjeant-at-law of our Lord the King in the Common Pleas".

Perhaps because the Attorney-General was in the earlier centuries junior to the Serjeant-at-law, some holders of the office were probably not as highly qualified as the Serjeant. Thomas Archbold (or Galmole), appointed Attorney-General in 1478, was a goldsmith by profession, and, perhaps more suitably, was also Master of the Royal Mint in Ireland.

== The Attorney-General and the Serjeant-at-law ==
In 1537 there was a short-lived attempt, following the report of a royal commission, to expand the role of the Attorney General, and abolish the office of King's Serjeant. The proposal was defeated largely through the firm opposition of the Serjeant-at-law, Patrick Barnewall, who argued that pleading cases on behalf of the Crown was and always had been the proper task of the Serjeant-at-law: "the King's Serjeant has always used to maintain the Pleas.... for this two hundred years and more". Why the more junior office was favoured over the much longer-established office of Serjeant is not clear.

From the early 1660s, due largely to the personal prestige of Sir William Domville (AG 1660–1686), the Attorney General became the chief legal adviser to the Crown. In certain periods, notably during the reign of Elizabeth I, who thought poorly of most of her Irish-born law officers, the English Crown adopted a policy of choosing only English lawyers for this office, and also the Solicitor-General. Her successor King James I in 1620, on the appointment of Sir William Ryves, noted that the Attorney-General and Solicitor-General "have always been of the King's choice and special nomination", and that they were the Crown servants in whom the King places, above his other learned counsel and officers of the Court: "his more special trust regarding the preservation of his revenue and possessions". It is interesting that the King here seems to place the Attorney and the Solicitor above the Serjeant-at-law in importance.

== Attorney-General in politics ==
The Attorney-General, in later centuries at least, was always a member of the Privy Council of Ireland (in earlier centuries as a rule only the Serjeant-at-law attended the Council, but Stephen Roche, Attorney General 1441–44, attended the Great Council of 1441).

A strong Attorney, like Philip Tisdall, William Saurin, or Francis Blackburne, could exercise great influence over the Dublin administration. Tisdall (AG 1760–1777), was for much of his tenure as Attorney General also the Government leader in the Irish House of Commons, and a crucial member of the administration. Saurin (AG 1807–1822) was regarded for many years as the effective head of the Dublin Government, until his career was ended by his opposition to Catholic emancipation. In 1841 Blackburne (AG 1830–1834, 1841–1842), on being challenged about a proposed appointment within his own office, said firmly that he "would not tolerate a refusal to ratify the appointment".

The office of Attorney General was described as being "a great mixture of law and general political reasoning".

== Attorneys-General for Ireland, 1313–1922 ==
=== 14th century ===
- Richard Manning: appears as a barrister in private practice in 1310; appointed "King's Attorney" or King's Serjeant for Ireland 1313. Still in office in 1327.
- William de Woodworth: c. 1327
- Thomas of Westham: 1334
- William Rouse: 17 April 1342
- William le Petit: 1343
- Nicholas Lumbard, or Lombard: 1345
- Robert de Emeldon: 1348
- Robert Preston, 1st Baron Gormanston: 1355
- John de Leycestre, or Lecestre: 1357
- William Lynnoor: 12 February 1359
- Henry Mitchell: 1372; promoted to Chief Baron of the Irish Exchequer 1376
- Robert Hore, or le Hore: 1379, (Note: Date of patent) superseded 1381. He appears to have served a second term in 1383–84, as he was re-appointed on 21 October 1383 and the Close Rolls have an order to pay his arrears of salary for those two years. On 28 July 1385 he was ordered not to "interefere" with the Office of Attorney-General any further.
- Thomas Malalo: 15 January 1381
- Robert Hemynborgh or de Hemynborough: 18 July 1385 (first term). He had the power to appoint a Deputy, one of the very few references in the records to such an office. His patent of office was renewed in 1407 on the same terms. He was to receive the same salary as Henry Mitchell had i.e. 1 pound and 1 shilling.

=== 15th century ===
Name	Term of office		Reason for leaving office
William Tynbegh	20 January 1400, having stepped down as a judge		
John Barry	appointed 16 February 1401;	still in office in 1404	
Robert de Hemynborough	appointed for a second term in 1407, in the same manner as King Richard II had previously granted the office to him.		
John Whyte or White	appointed 20 August 1412 re-appointed 4 October 1413 re-appointed 19 October 1422;	still in office 1426, when he was described as "the King's Attorney in the Exchequer"	
Stephen Roche	1441		
William Sutton	1444		
Robert FitzRery	1450		
Thomas Dowdall	1463 (Note: Some sources refer to him as King's Serjeant, but the roles of Serjeant and Attorney at the time were easily confused.)		
Nicholas Sutton	1471 or 1472		
Thomas Archbold	1478		
Thomas Cusacke	1480		
Walter St. Lawrence	1491		
Clement Fitzleones	1499	By 1505	Appointed as King's Serjeant

=== 16th century ===
incomplete - Smyth in his book Chronicle of the Irish Law Officers (London, 1839) noted that the destruction of many State records made it impossible to compile a full list of holders of the office. With the exception of one roll for the 6th year of Henry VIII (1514–5), the patent rolls for the reign of that monarch were extant from the 22nd year of his reign (1530–31), at the time of the Four Courts fire in 1922.

Name	Portrait	Term of office		Reason for leaving office
John Barnewall, 3rd Baron Trimlestown		1504	1504	Appointed as Solicitor-General for Ireland and King's Serjeant
Nicholas Fitzsimons		1504 or later	1514	Appointed third Baron of the Exchequer
Unknown
Thomas St. Lawrence		18 August 1532	12 August 1535 (Note: Date of appointment to office in next column)	Appointed as a Judge of the Court of King's Bench (Ireland)
Robert Dillon		August 1535	17 January 1554 also	Appointed as a Judge of the Court of King's Bench (Ireland)
Barnaby Skurloke or Skurlog		1554 re-appointed 26 January 1559	1559	Dismissed
James Barnewall		3 September 1559		
Lucas Dillon		8 November 1566	17 May 1570 (Note: Date of Privy Seal)	Appointed as Chief Baron of the Irish Exchequer
Edward Fitz-Symon		4 June 1570	21 February 1574	Appointed as King's Serjeant
John Bathe		21 February 1574	1577	Removed from office
Thomas Snagge		13 September 1577	1580	"returned to England in 1580, when he was appointed serjeant-at-law"
Christopher Flemyng, or Fleming		9 September 1580		Death
Edmund or Edward Butler		8 August 1582	20 September 1583	Appointed as a Judge of the Court of Queen's Bench (Ireland)
Charles Calthorpe, afterwards Sir Charles		22 June 1584	19 April 1606	Appointed as a Judge of the Court of Common Pleas (Ireland)

=== 17th century ===
Name	Portrait	Term of office		Reason for leaving office
Sir John Davys or Davies; MP for County Fermanagh (1613)		19 April 1606	1619	Resigned
Sir William Ryves		30 October 1619	7 August 1636	Appointed as a Judge of the Court of King's Bench (Ireland)
Richard Osbaldeston of Gray's Inn		7 August 1636	June 1640	Death
Sir Thomas Tempest		20 July 1640		
William Basil		18 July 1649	24 January 1659	Appointed as Chief Justice of the Upper Bench for Ireland
Robert Shapcote		March 1659	May 1659	Deprived of the position when the Rump Parliament was restored
Unknown		May 1659	February 1660	
Robert Shapcote		February 1660 (Note: Restored to the position when the secluded members of the Rump Parliament were allowed in February 1660)	May 1660	Elected as MP for Tiverton in the Parliament of England in the Convention Parliament (1660), which assembled for the first time on 25 April 1660.
Sir William Domville; MP for County Dublin (1661-66)		23 June 1660		Retired
Sir Richard Nagle; MP for County Cork (1689)		31 December 1686	3 October 1691 (Note: Date of the Treaty of Limerick) (Note: Attorney-General for Jacobite Ireland only after the appointment of Sir John Temple as Attorney-General for Williamite Ireland on 30 October 1690)	Jacobite Ireland ceased to exist due to the Treaty of Limerick
Sir John Temple		30 October 1690 (Note: Attorney-General for Williamite Ireland only until the Treaty of Limerick of 3 October 1691)		Retired
Robert Rochfort; MP for County Westmeath		10 May 1695	12 June 1707	Appointed as Chief Baron of the Irish Exchequer

=== 18th century ===
Name	Portrait	Term of office		Reason for leaving office	Subsequent peerage, if any
Alan Brodrick; MP for Cork City		12 June 1707	24 December 1709	Appointed as Lord Chief Justice of the King's Bench for Ireland	Viscount Midleton
John Forster; MP for Dublin City		24 December 1709		Dismissed (Note: "[W]hen the Irish administration came under the domination of the ultra-tory lord chancellor, Sir Constantine Phipps, he was dropped as attorney general in 1711 and emerged as one of the principal leaders of the opposition.") - Appointed as Chief Justice of the Common Pleas for Ireland, 1714	
Sir Richard Levinge, 1st Baronet; MP for Longford Borough (to 1713); MP for Gowran (1713); MP for Kilkenny City (from 1713)		4 June 1711		Dismissed (Note: "In 1714 he was replaced as Irish attorney general in the whig purge which followed the accession of George I.") (Note: "on the accession of George I in 1714 was superseded as attorney-general, but was offered the place of a justice of the King’s Bench, which he declined") - Appointed as Chief Justice of the Common Pleas for Ireland, 1721	
George Gore; MP for Longford Borough		3 Nov 1714	13 May 1720	Appointed as a Judge of the Court of Common Pleas (Ireland)	
John Rogerson; MP for Dublin City		14 May 1720	3 April 1727	Appointed as Lord Chief Justice of the King's Bench for Ireland	
Thomas Marlay; MP for Lanesborough		5 May 1727	29 September 1730	Appointed as Chief Baron of the Irish Exchequer	
Robert Jocelyn; MP for Newtownards		29 September 1730	30 August 1739	Appointed as Lord Chancellor of Ireland	Viscount Jocelyn
John Bowes; MP for Taghmon		3 Sep 1739	21 December 1741	Appointed as Chief Baron of the Irish Exchequer	Baron Bowes
St George Caulfeild; MP for Tulsk		23 Dec 1741	27 August 1751	Appointed as Lord Chief Justice of the King's Bench for Ireland	
Warden Flood; MP for Callan		27 August 1751	31 July 1760	Appointed as Lord Chief Justice of the King's Bench for Ireland	
Philip Tisdall; MP for Dublin University (to 1776); MP for Armagh Borough (1768–69 and 1776–77)		31 July 1760	11 September 1777	Death	
John Scott; MP for Mullingar		17 Oct 1777		Dismissed (Note: "With the collapse of Lord North's government in March 1782, he was dismissed from office. Scott was generally believed to have known that he would be removed and to have decided to provoke his dismissal by asserting during the debates on legislative independence that Great Britain had no right to bind Ireland by acts of parliament"); Appointed as Lord Chief Justice of the King's Bench for Ireland, 1784	Earl of Clonmell
Barry Yelverton; MP for Carrickfergus		2 July 1782	29 November 1783	Appointed as Chief Baron of the Irish Exchequer	Viscount Avonmore
John Fitzgibbon; MP for Kilmallock		29 Nov 1783	13 June 1789	Appointed as Lord Chancellor of Ireland	Earl of Clare
Arthur Wolfe; MP for Coleraine (to 1790); MP for Jamestown (1790–1797); MP for Dublin City (1797–1798)		16 July 1789	13 June 1798	Appointed as Lord Chief Justice of the King's Bench for Ireland	Viscount Kilwarden
John Toler; MP for Gorey		26 June 1798	22 October 1800	Appointed as Chief Justice of the Common Pleas for Ireland	Earl of Norbury

=== 19th century ===
Name	Portrait	Term of office		Political party	Reason for leaving office
John Stewart; MP for Bangor (Parliament of Ireland) (to 31 December 1800); MP for County Tyrone (UK Parliament) (from 1 March 1802)		9 December 1800			Retired/resigned (Note: "Disappointed at not being named chief justice of the king's bench, he retired and was created a baronet on 21 June 1803. King George III ascribed his resignation to ill-health and his weaknesses as a law officer.") citing
Standish O'Grady (Note: "nor was he ever in the Irish or British House of Commons")		28 May 1803	5 October 1805		Appointed as Chief Baron of the Irish Exchequer
William Plunket; MP for Midhurst (1807)		15 October 1805		Independent	
William Plunket; MP for Midhurst (1807)		15 October 1805		Whig (Note: "In October 1805 Pitt made Plunket attorney-general, and Plunket retained that office in the 'ministry of all the talents'. Hitherto, with official approval, he had treated the post as professional and non-political. Now it became a party and parliamentary one. He ... was urged by Lord Grenville to enter the House of Commons. ... early in 1807. He ... became an adherent of Lord Grenville ... Having identified himself with the whigs, he declined the request of the new tory administration that he retain the attorney-generalship.")	Ministry left office - he was reappointed in 1822 - see below
William Saurin		15 May 1807		Tory (Note: "With all his present Toryism, he seems to have been then a Whig") (Note: "something of a republican by nature, but fashioned by circumstances into a Tory")	Dismissed
William Plunket; MP for Dublin University		15 January 1822	18 June 1827	Whig (Note: he was one of the "Grenvillites who [in 1822] joined Liverpool's government")	Appointed as Chief Justice of the Common Pleas for Ireland
Henry Joy		18 June 1827	6 January 1831	Tory (Note: "was [after 1798] allied with the tory party")	Appointed as Chief Baron of the Irish Exchequer
Edward Pennefather		23 December 1830 (Note: However, Chronicle of the Law Officers of Ireland does not mention him, and neither Elrington Ball's The Judges in Ireland, Volume 2, page 354 nor Pennefather's article in the Dictionary of National Biography mentions service in this office. "[T]he attorney-general-ship was ... offered to ... Edward Pennefather ... and on his declining to serve in a reform administration it was given on Pennefather's advice to ... Francis Blackburne".)		Tory (Note: "was a conservative in politics")	Declined to serve
Francis Blackburne		11 January 1831 (Note: Cook & Keith (1975, p. 4) states that the office was vacant under Peel's Conservative government of 1834-35. However, Blackburne's article in the Dictionary of National Biography states that "He continued in that office until 1835, under Grey and during the initial short administrations of Melbourne and Peel." Also Blackburne, Edward (1874). Life of the Right Hon. Francis Blackburne: Late Lord Chancellor of Ireland. Macmillan and Co. p. 194. states that "Sir Robert Peel requested Blackburne to retain his office ... The Peel administration was destined to be of but short duration ... Melbourne was recalled to power ... Blackburne retired from office")		Tory (Note: "though known to be a tory ... with a view to the Irish administration having a broad political base") (Note: "was in politics a conservative")	
Francis Blackburne		11 January 1831		Conservative	Ministry left office - he was reappointed in 1841 - see below
Louis Perrin; MP for Cashel		29 April 1835	31 August 1835	Whig	Appointed as a Judge of the Court of King's Bench (Ireland)
Michael O'Loghlen; MP for Dungarvan		31 August 1835		Whig	Appointed as a Baron of the Court of Exchequer (Ireland)
John Richards		10 November 1836		Whig	Appointed as a Baron of the Court of Exchequer (Ireland)
Stephen Woulfe; MP for Cashel		3 February 1837		Whig	Appointed as Chief Baron of the Irish Exchequer
Nicholas Ball; MP for Clonmel		11 July 1838		Whig	Appointed as a Judge of the Court of Common Pleas (Ireland)
Maziere Brady		23 February 1839		Whig	Appointed as Chief Baron of the Irish Exchequer
David Richard Pigot; MP for Clonmel		11 August 1840		Whig	Ministry left office - he was appointed as Chief Baron of the Irish Exchequer in 1846
Francis Blackburne		23 September 1841		Conservative	Appointed as Master of the Rolls in Ireland
Thomas Berry Cusack Smith; MP for Ripon, 1843-6		1 November 1842		Conservative	Appointed as Master of the Rolls in Ireland
Richard Wilson Greene		2 February 1846		Conservative	Ministry left office - he was appointed as a Baron of the Court of Exchequer (Ireland) in 1852
Richard Moore		16 July 1846		Whig	Appointed as a Judge of the Court of Queen's Bench (Ireland)
James Henry Monahan		21 December 1847		Whig	Appointed as Chief Justice of the Common Pleas for Ireland
John Hatchell; MP for Windsor		23 September 1850		Whig	Ministry left office
Joseph Napier; MP for Dublin University		February 1852		Conservative	Ministry left office - he was appointed as Lord Chancellor of Ireland in 1858
Abraham Brewster		10 January 1853		Peelite	Ministry left office - he was appointed as Lord Justice of Appeal in Chancery in Ireland in 1866
William Keogh; MP for Athlone		March 1855		Peelite	Appointed as a Judge of the Court of Common Pleas (Ireland)
John David Fitzgerald; MP for Ennis		March 1856		Whig	Ministry left office - he was reappointed in 1859 - see below
James Whiteside; MP for Dublin University		February 1858		Conservative	Ministry left office - he was appointed as Lord Chief Justice of the Queen's Bench for Ireland in 1866
John David Fitzgerald; MP for Ennis		June 1859		Liberal	Appointed as a Judge of the Court of Queen's Bench (Ireland)
Rickard Deasy; MP for County Cork		February 1860		Liberal	Appointed as a Baron of the Court of Exchequer (Ireland)
Thomas O'Hagan; MP for Tralee (1863-65)		1861		Liberal	Appointed as a Judge of the Court of Common Pleas (Ireland)
James Anthony Lawson; MP for Portarlington		1865		Liberal	Ministry left office - he was appointed as a Judge of the Court of Common Pleas (Ireland) in December 1868
John Edward Walsh; MP for Dublin University		25 July 1866		Conservative	Appointed as Master of the Rolls in Ireland
Michael Morris; MP for Galway Borough		1 November 1866		Conservative	Appointed as a Judge of the Court of Common Pleas (Ireland)
Hedges Eyre Chatterton; MP for Dublin University		1867		Conservative	Appointed Vice-Chancellor of Ireland
Robert Warren; MP for Dublin University		1867		Conservative	Appointed the Irish Probate Judge
John Thomas Ball; MP for Dublin University		1868		Conservative	Ministry left office - he was reappointed in 1874 - see below
Edward Sullivan; MP for Mallow		12 December 1868		Liberal	Appointed as Master of the Rolls in Ireland
Charles Robert Barry (Note: He had unsuccessfully sought re-election for the parliamentary constituency of Dungarvan in 1868.)		26 January 1870		Liberal	Appointed as a Judge of the Court of Queen's Bench (Ireland)
Richard Dowse; MP for Londonderry City		13 January 1872		Liberal	Appointed as a Baron of the Court of Exchequer (Ireland)
Christopher Palles (Note: He unsuccessfully contested the parliamentary constituency of Londonderry City in 1872.)		5 November 1872	10 February 1874	Liberal	Appointed as Chief Baron of the Irish Exchequer
John Thomas Ball; MP for Dublin University		12 March 1874		Conservative	Appointed as Lord Chancellor of Ireland
Henry Ormsby		21 January 1875		Conservative	Appointed as Judge of the Landed Estates Court
George Augustus Chichester May (Note: He had unsuccessfully contested the parliamentary constituency of Carrickfergus in 1874.)		27 November 1875		Conservative	Appointed as Lord Chief Justice of the Queen's Bench for Ireland
Edward Gibson; MP for Dublin University		15 February 1877		Conservative	Ministry left office - he was appointed as Lord Chancellor of Ireland in 1885
Hugh Law; MP for County Londonderry		10 May 1880		Liberal	Appointed as Lord Chancellor of Ireland
William Moore Johnson; MP for Mallow		17 November 1881		Liberal	Appointed as a Judge of the High Court of Justice in Ireland
Andrew Marshall Porter; MP for County Londonderry		3 January 1883		Liberal	Appointed as Master of the Rolls in Ireland
John Naish (Note: He had unsuccessfully contested the parliamentary constituency of Mallow in 1883.)		19 December 1883		Liberal	Appointed as Lord Chancellor of Ireland
Samuel Walker; MP for County Londonderry		1885		Liberal	Ministry left office - he was reappointed in 1886 - see below
Hugh Holmes; MP for Dublin University		3 July 1885		Conservative	Ministry left office - he was reappointed in 1886 - see below
Samuel Walker (Note: He had unsuccessfully contested the parliamentary constituency of North Londonderry in 1885.)		February 1886		Liberal	Ministry left office - he was appointed as Lord Chancellor of Ireland in 1892
Hugh Holmes; MP for Dublin University		August 1886		Conservative	Appointed as a Judge of the High Court of Justice in Ireland
John George Gibson; MP for Liverpool Walton		1887		Conservative	Appointed as a Judge of the High Court of Justice in Ireland
Peter O'Brien		1888		Conservative	Appointed as Lord Chief Justice of Ireland
Dodgson Hamilton Madden; MP for Dublin University		1890		Conservative	Appointed as a Judge of the High Court of Justice in Ireland
John Atkinson		1892		Conservative	Ministry left office - he was reappointed in 1895 - see below
Hugh Hyacinth O'Rorke MacDermot (Note: He had unsuccessfully contested the parliamentary constituency of West Derbyshire in 1892.)		August 1892		Liberal	Ministry left office (he died before his party regained office)
John Atkinson; MP for North Londonderry		8 July 1895		Conservative	Appointed to the House of Lords as a Lord of Appeal in Ordinary

=== 20th century ===
Name	Portrait	Term of office		Political party	Reason for leaving office
James Campbell; MP for Dublin University		4 December 1905		Conservative	Ministry left office - he was reappointed in 1916 - see below
Richard Cherry; MP for Liverpool Exchange (1906–10)		22 December 1905		Liberal	Appointed as a Lord Justice of the Court of Appeal in Ireland
Redmond Barry; MP for North Tyrone (1907–11)		2 December 1909		Liberal	Appointed as Lord Chancellor of Ireland
Charles O'Connor		26 September 1911		Liberal	Appointed as Master of the Rolls in Ireland
Ignatius O'Brien		24 June 1912		Liberal	Appointed as Lord Chancellor of Ireland
Thomas Molony		10 April 1913		Liberal	Appointed as a Judge of the High Court of Justice in Ireland
John Moriarty		20 June 1913		Liberal	Appointed as a Lord Justice of the Court of Appeal in Ireland
Jonathan Pim		1 July 1914		Liberal	Appointed as a Judge of the High Court of Justice in Ireland
John Gordon; MP for South Londonderry		8 June 1915		Conservative	Appointed as a Judge of the High Court of Justice in Ireland
James Campbell; MP for Dublin University		9 April 1916		Conservative	Appointed as Lord Chief Justice of Ireland
James O'Connor		8 January 1917		Irish Nationalist	Appointed as a Judge of the High Court of Justice in Ireland
Arthur Samuels; MP for Dublin University		7 April 1918		Conservative	Appointed as a Judge of the High Court of Justice in Ireland
Denis Henry; MP for South Londonderry		6 July 1919		Conservative	Appointed as the first Lord Chief Justice of Northern Ireland, 15 August 1921
Thomas Watters Brown; MP for North Down		5 August 1921	16 November 1921	Conservative	Appointed as a Judge of the High Court of Justice in Northern Ireland, 8 February 1922

The office was vacant from 16 November 1921 and succeeded by the Attorney General of the Irish Free State on 31 January 1922. The office of Attorney General for Northern Ireland had been created in June 1921.

== Notes, references and sources ==
=== References ===
- Haydn's Book of Dignities (for pre-1691 names and dates)

=== Sources ===
- Aspinall, Arthur, ed. (1968). The later correspondence of George III. Vol. 4. Cambridge University Press.
- Ball, F. Elrington (1926a). The Judges in Ireland 1221–1921. Vol. I. London: John Murray.
- Ball, F. Elrington (1926b). The Judges in Ireland 1221–1921. Vol. II. London: John Murray.
- Cook, Chris; Keith, Brendan (1975). British Historical Facts, 1830–1900. London: Macmillan. ISBN 978-1-349-01348-7.
- Sheil, Richard Lalor (1855). Savage, M.W. (ed.). Sketches Legal And Political. Vol. I. London: Published for Henry Colburn by his successors, Hurst & Blackett.

=== Further reading ===
- Smyth, Constantine J. (1839). Chronicle of the law officers of Ireland . London: Henry Butterworth.

=== External links ===
- Attorney-General for Ireland, list of office holders 1835–1921, with links to their Hansard contributions; from millbanksystems.com
