= William Sutton (lawyer) =

Irish judge

- Born: Irish
- Occupation: Irish judge

William Sutton (c.1405 – 1480) was an Irish judge of the fifteenth century, who served briefly as Attorney General for Ireland and then for many years as third Baron of the Court of Exchequer (Ireland). He was the father of Nicholas Sutton, who followed the same career path, but died young before his father.

== Background and career ==
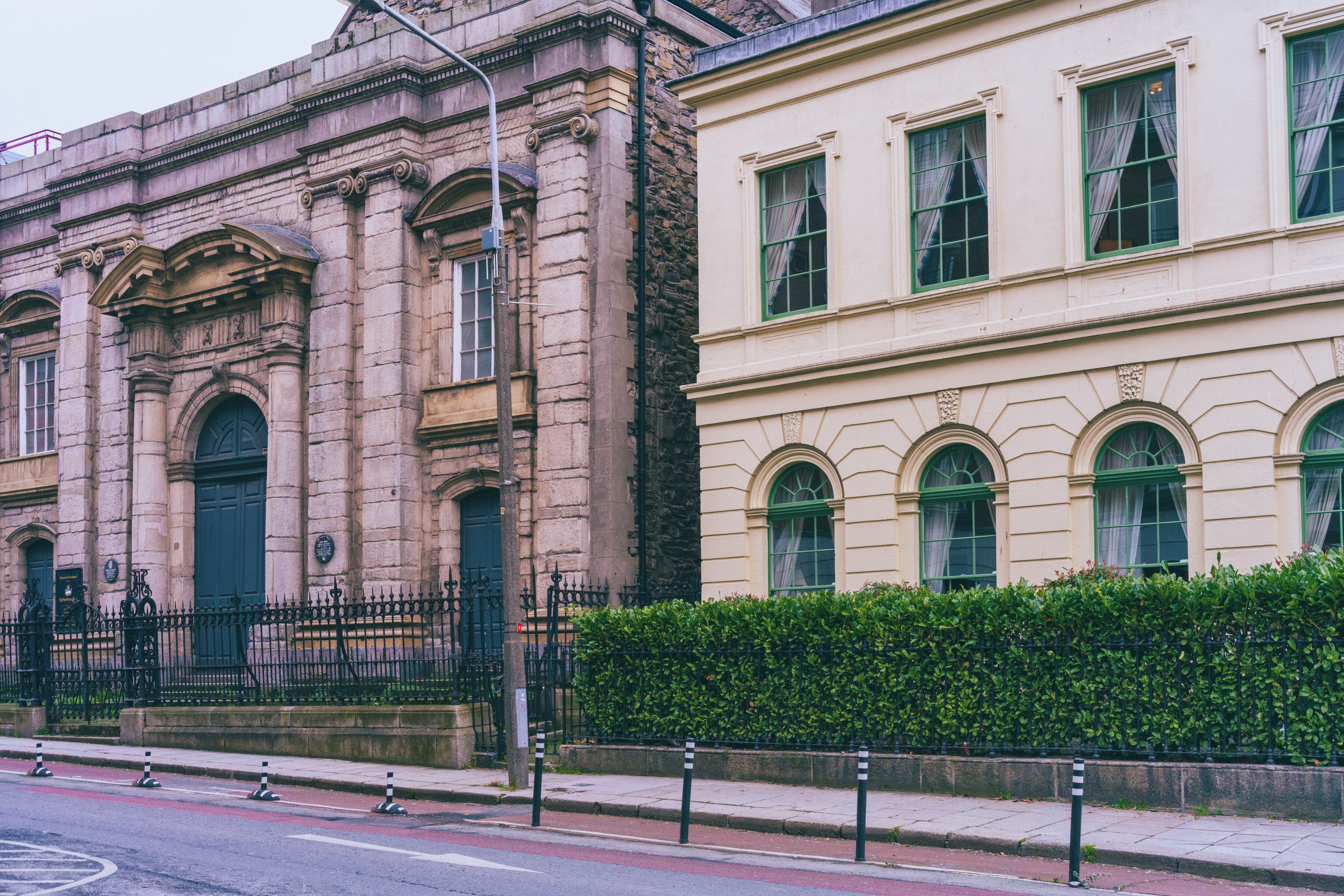
Werburgh Street, present day

William was the son of Roger Sutton of Dublin, who lived at Werburgh Street, Dublin. His first official appointments seem to have been as Clerk of the Markets for County Meath in 1432, and then Clerk of the Crown and Hanaper in 1431 or 1432. He was appointed Attorney General in about 1444 and third Baron of the Exchequer in 1445. Despite his complaint that he was about to be superseded in 1461, which was coupled with a plea to Parliament to pay his arrears of salary, he was still on the Bench in 1477. He was an associate of Richard of York during York's tenure as Lord Lieutenant of Ireland (1447–60). Under Richard's son Edward IV he succeeded in having his arrears of salary paid, the Crown admitting that he had not been paid for years. In recompense, he was awarded 20 marks per annum in 1461. He was also granted by Act of Parliament the profits of various wardships held by him.

== Family and last years ==
William married Alison Darby. He died in 1480. His son, Nicholas, had predeceased him and his widowed daughter-in-law, Anne Cusacke, had remarried. This may explain his decision, notwithstanding that he had grandchildren, to leave all his lands and a large bequest to Christ Church Cathedral, Dublin; despite his pleas for payment of his overdue salary in the 1460s, he seems to have amassed considerable wealth in his later years.

His son's will, which no longer exists, has been described as containing some "curious details", including a legacy to his father in return for his blessing.
