= Áed Dub mac Colmáin =

King of Leinster and saint

Saint Áed Dub mac Colmáin
- Residence: Leinster, Ireland
- Feast: 4 January

Áed Dub mac Colmáin or Áed(h) of Kildare is a former King of Leinster, and an Irish saint, commemorated by Colgan under date of 4 January; but much obscurity attaches to his life-work.

== History ==
The Annals of the Four Masters and the Annals of Ulster agree in the account of this monarch, who resigned his crown and eventually became Bishop of Kildare. He belonged to the ruling Uí Dúnlainge dynasty of north Leinster; his father was Colmán Már. Áed was the brother of King Fáelán mac Colmáin.

Under the name of Aidus, a Latinized form of Áed, his name is to be found in several martyrologies. The year of his death was 639, according to the corrected chronology of the "Annals of Ulster."

Colgan tells us that he resigned the throne of Leinster in 591 (really, 592), and entered the great monastery of Kildare, where he served God for forty-eight years, becoming successively abbot of Kildare and bishop of Kildare. His episcopate was from about 630 to 639.

He should not be confounded with Áed Finn, king of Ossory, known as "Áed the cleric," who was a contemporary and resigned the throne of Ossory for a monastic cell. St. Áed of Leinster is styled Áed Dub, from his dark features, whilst Áed of Ossory was fair, hence the affix finn (fionn = fair). Another St. Áed is venerated on 3 May.
