= Colgan =

Colgan is an Irish surname, an Anglicized form of Irish Ó Colgáin meaning "descendant of Colga", a personal name based on colg "thorn," "sword." Notable people with the surname include:

- Arthur Colgan (born 1946), American Roman Catholic bishop
- Carol Colgan (born 1960), Canadian rower
- Charles J. Colgan (1926–2017), American Democratic politician and businessman from Virginia
- Eileen Colgan (c. 1934–2014), Irish actress
- Flavia Colgan, American Democratic strategist
- Gerry Colgan (1951–2011), Scottish teacher and footballer
- Gregory Colgan (born 1953), Australian cricketer
- Jenny Colgan, British novelist
- John Colgan, Irish hagiographer and historian
- Michael Colgan (disambiguation), multiple people
- Nick Colgan, Irish football goalkeeper
- Stevyn Colgan, Cornish writer, artist and songwriter
- Diana Colgan, economist

== See also ==
- Colgan, North Dakota, unincorporated community, United States
- Colgan Air, an American regional airline
