= Great Connell Priory =

- Prióireacht Chonnail Mhór
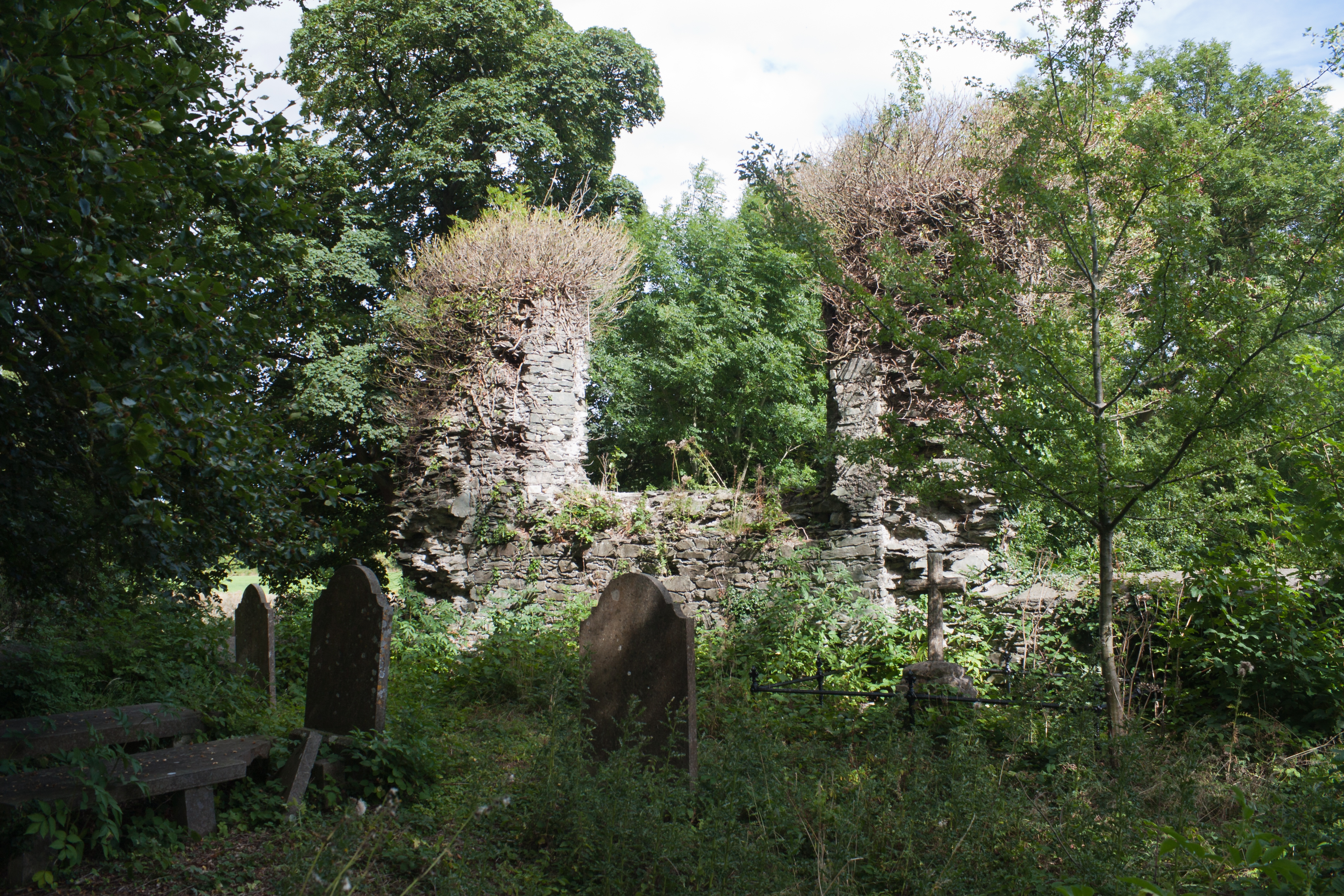
- Choir east window

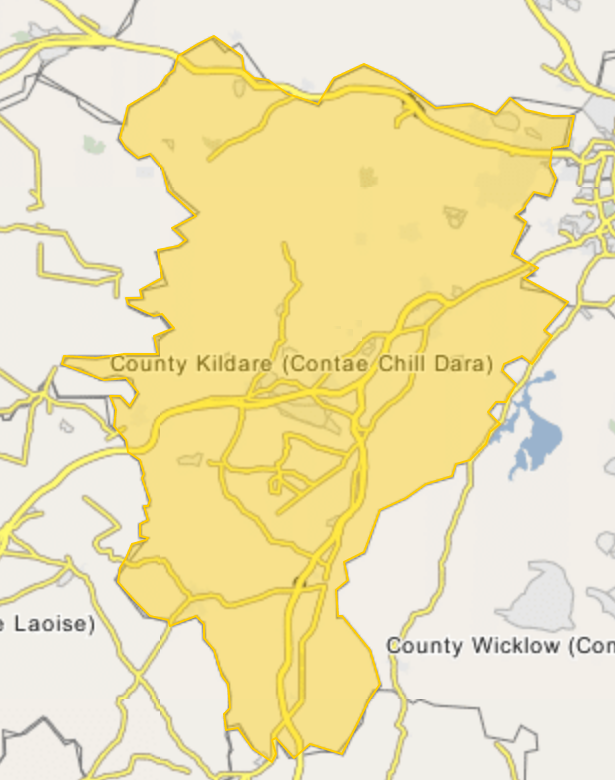
- Location within County Kildare Location within Ireland
- Interactive map of Great Connell Priory

Monastery information
- Other names: Monaster-Conghbala; Conal; Connayl
- Order: Augustinian Canons Regular
- Established: 1202
- Disestablished: 1540
- Diocese: Kildare

People
- Founder: Meiler Fitzhenry

Architecture
- Status: ruined
- Style: Norman

Site
- Location: Great Connell, Newbridge, County Kildare
- Coordinates: 53°10′21″N 6°46′32″W
- Public access: yes

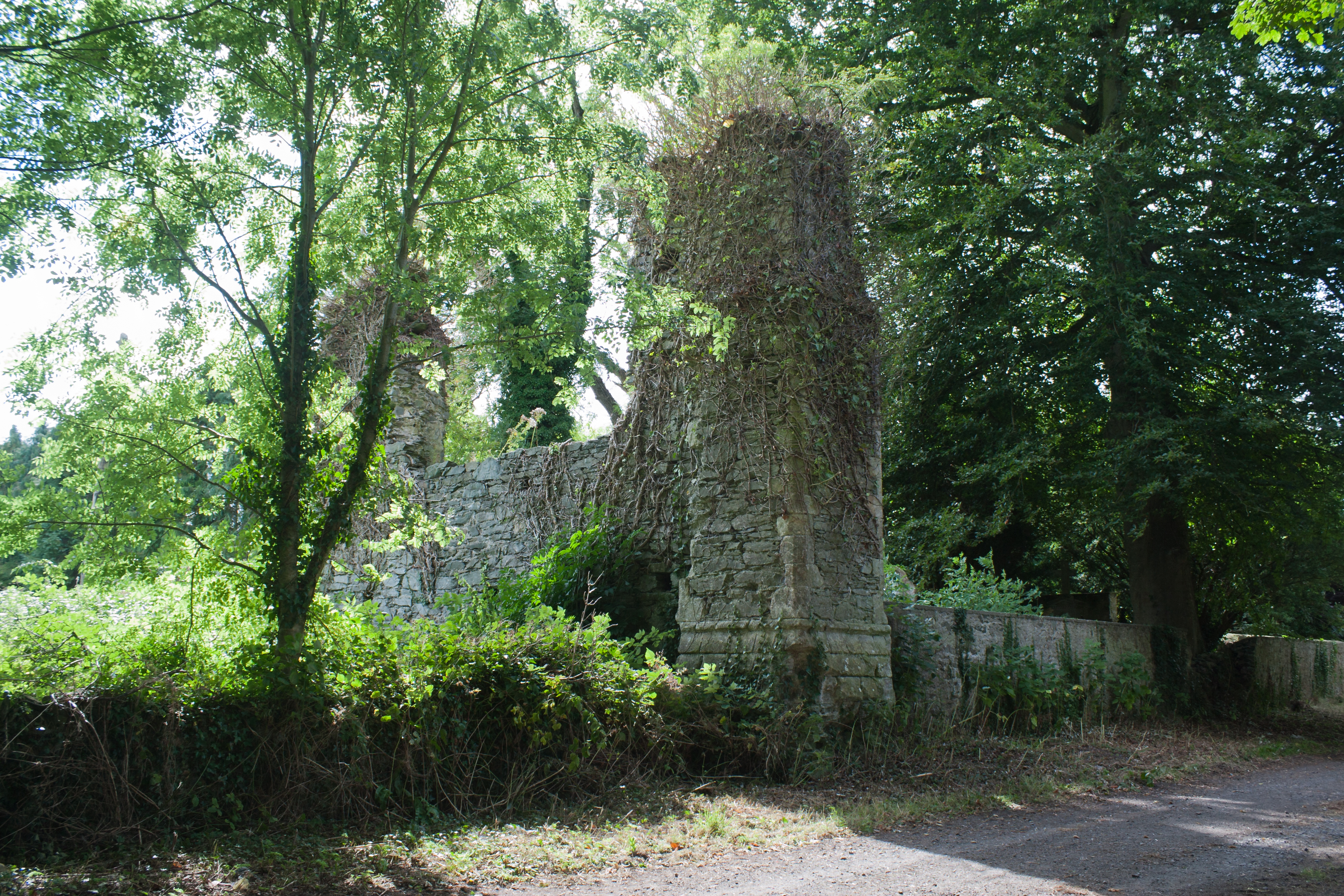
Surviving remains of the east window of Great Connell Priory

Great Connell Priory (Irish: Prióireacht Chonnail Mhór) is a former house of Augustinian canons dedicated to Saint Mary and Saint David, situated on the eastern side of the River Liffey, in the Barony of Connell just to the south-east of the town of Newbridge, County Kildare, Ireland.

The priory was founded in 1202 as a dependency of Llanthony Priory in Wales by the illegitimate grandson of the Angevin King Henry II, Meiler fitz Henry, who also founded abbeys in Laois, Clonfert and Killaloe. It was located just north of a ford across the River Liffey, known as Connell Ford. It was endowed with extensive lands in the baronies of Connell and Carbury and elsewhere in Ireland. In 1203 the last King of the Ui Faeláin, Faeláin Mac Faeláin, died as a monk there. The founder entered the priory himself in 1216 and died there in 1220. It was a rule of the house that only English monks could be admitted; it does not seem that this rule was always enforced, although, in 1537, when the priory was threatened with closure, the prior assured Thomas Cromwell that no Irish brother had ever been admitted.

Great Connell became one of the principal monasteries of the Pale and acquired substantial property. In 1455 the King granted it power to acquire lands to a yearly value of £10. At its height, it was estimated to own 1260 acres of land, 6 churches, 5 castles and a mill. A statute of the Parliament of Ireland of 1475 authorised the Abbott to deal with Abbey's property in the "lands of the King's enemies" i.e. territories controlled by hostile Irish clans, without committing a crime as would otherwise be the case. The Abbot was also permitted to enter contracts with the Irish for the purchase or sale of land and foodstuffs. The prior was also frequently a member of the Irish Privy Council, as Prior Philip Stroyle was in the 1430s, Prior Nicholas in the 1460s, and Prior Walter Wellesley in the 1520s.

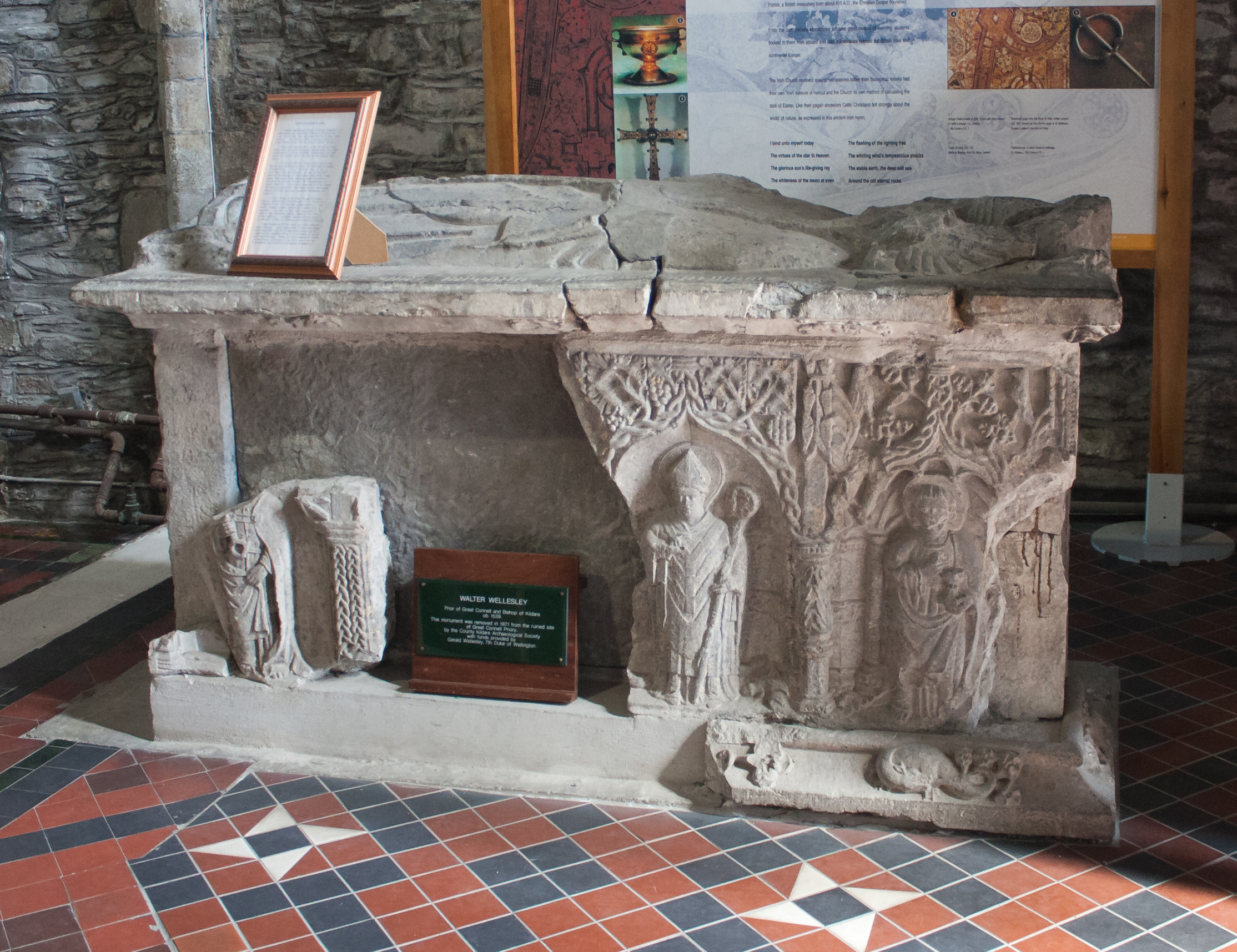
Tomb of Walter Wellesley which was moved to the south transept of Kildare Cathedral in 1971

The most powerful prior of Great Connell was Walter Wellesley, who was appointed before 1520, and who remained prior even after he became Bishop of Kildare in 1529. He had considerable influence with Henry VIII, and at the suppression of the religious houses, he used all his influence to save Great Connell. He was successful in the short term, but his death in 1539 left the priory without an influential protector. The priory was suppressed c. 1540 with the consent of the last prior Robert Wellesley, and the property was granted first to Edward Randolfe, then to Sir Nicholas White in 1560, and to Sir Edmond Butler in 1566.

Much of the original masonry was removed from the priory and used in the construction of the British Cavalry Barracks in Newbridge in the early 19th century. At that time the top of the tomb of Walter Wellesley and some other fragments were discovered and built into the wall of the cemetery at the site. The tomb of Walter Wellesley was moved in 1971 to Kildare Cathedral and reconstructed by the County Kildare Archaeological Society with financial support by Gerald Wellesley, 7th Duke of Wellington.

== See also ==
- List of abbeys and priories in Ireland (County Kildare)
