= Edward Ledwich (priest) =

Irish Anglican priest

Edward Ledwich, LL.D.(1707–1782) was an Anglican priest in Ireland.

Ledwich was born in Dublin and educated at Trinity College, Dublin. Ledwich was a prebendary of Christ Church Cathedral, Dublin from 1749 to 1781; 4th Canon of Kildare Cathedral from October to December 1760; Treasurer of Kildare Cathedral from 1760 to 1772; Archdeacon of Kildare from 1765 to 1772; and Dean of Kildare from 1772 until his death.
