= Daniel Neylan =

Irish Anglican bishop

Daniel Neylan (sometimes Neland) was a bishop in Ireland at the end of the sixteenth and beginning of the seventeenth centuries. He was Bishop of Kildare.

Neylan succeeded by letter from Queen Elizabeth on Nominated to the see on 17 May 1644, he was consecrated on 3 July 1783; and died on 18 May 1603.

Religious titles
Preceded by Robert Daly	Bishop of Kildare; 1583–1603	Succeeded by William Pilsworth
