= Bishop of Kildare =

Episcopal title

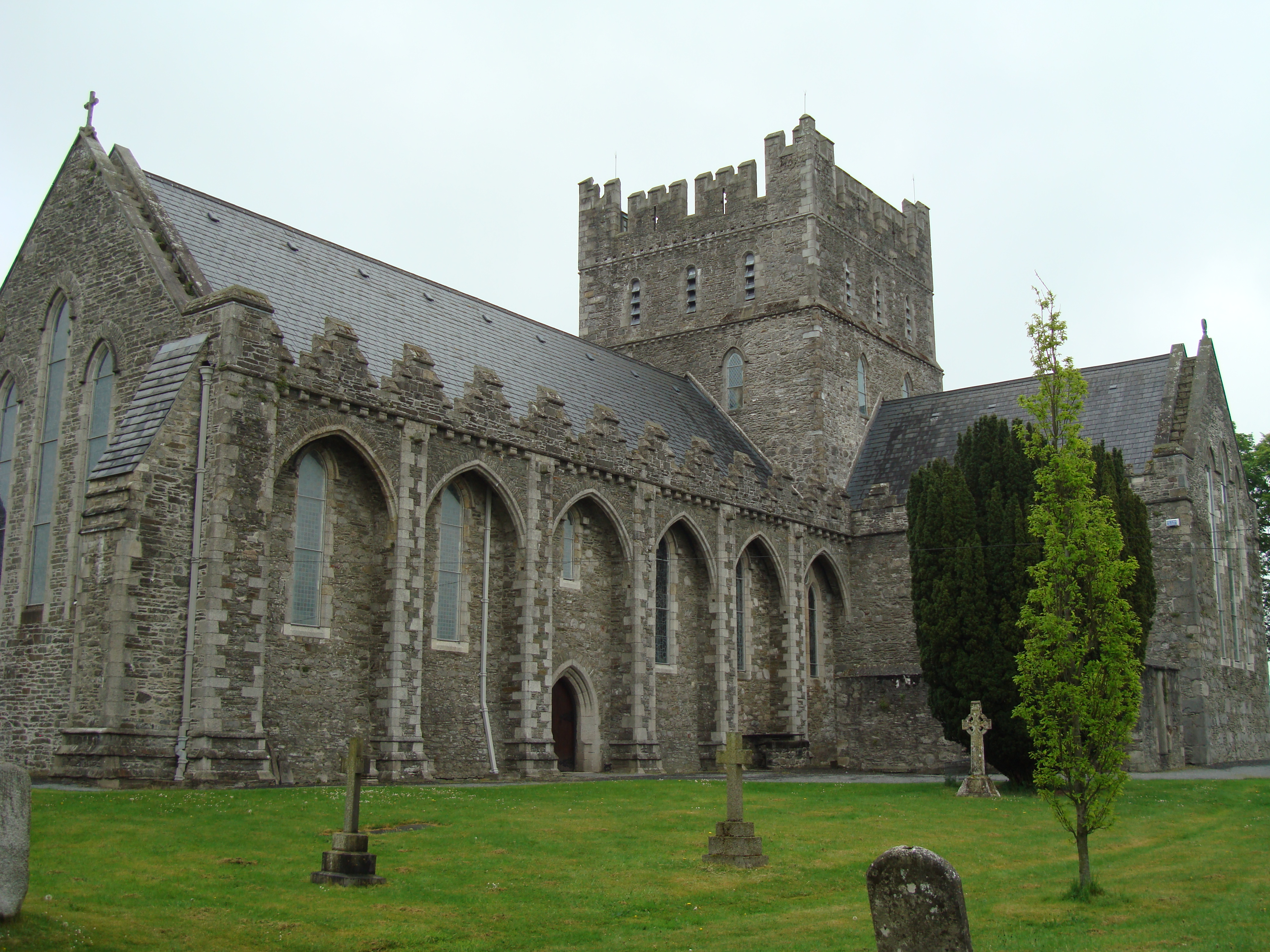
St. Brigid's Cathedral, Kildare

The Bishop of Kildare was an episcopal title which took its name after the town of Kildare in County Kildare, Ireland. The title is no longer in use by any of the main Christian churches having been united with other bishoprics. In the Roman Catholic Church, the title has been merged with that of the bishopric of Leighlin and is currently held by the Bishop of Kildare and Leighlin. In the Church of Ireland, the title has been merged with that of the bishopric of Meath and is currently held by the Bishop of Meath and Kildare.

== History ==
In the 5th century, the Abbey of Kildare was founded by Saint Brigid, a double monastery of nuns and monks. The abbey was governed by an abbess, who was the 'heir of Brigit' (comarbae Brigte), and by abbots, bishops and abbot-bishops, who were subordinate to the abbess.

Although the bishopric was founded with the abbey in the fifth century, it wasn't until 1111 AD that the diocese of Kildare was established at the Synod of Rathbreasail. The diocese covered roughly the northern part of County Kildare and the eastern part of County Offaly.

After the episcopate of Walter Wellesley (1529–1539), there were parallel apostolic successions. In the Church of Ireland, Kildare continued as an independent diocese until 1846 when it amalgamated with Dublin and Glendalough to form the united Diocese of Dublin, Kildare and Glendalough. In 1976, Kildare broke away from Dublin and Glendalough and combined with Meath to form the current united Diocese of Meath and Kildare. The Roman Catholic bishopric of Kildare too remained separate until it linked with the bishopric of Leighlin. The bishops of Kildare had been apostolic administrators of Leighlin since 1683 and the union of the two sees was formally decreed on 29 November 1694.

== Pre-Reformation bishops ==
=== Monastic bishops of Kildare ===
Monastic Bishops of Kildare
Tenure	Incumbent	Notes
d. 520	Conláed ua hEimri	Known as Saint Conleth; died, according to tradition, 3 May 520
d. 639	Áed Dub mac Colmáin	Abbot and Bishop of Kildare; brother of Fáelán mac Colmáin, King of Leinster
d. 709	Máel Dobarchon	Died 19 February 709.
d. 762	Eóthigern	Killed by a priest "at St Brigit's altar" (i.e. Kildare Abbey, later became Cathedral)
d. 787	Lomthuile	
d. 787	Snéidbran	
d. 834	Tuathchar	Scribe
d. 840	Orthanach ua Cóellámae Cuirrig	
d. 864	Áedgen Britt	Also a scribe and anchorite; died 18 December 862 (or 864)
d. 870	Móengal	
d. 875	Robartach mac na Cerddac	Also was scribe and Abbot of Killeigh
d. 875	Lachtnán mac Mochthigirn	Also was Abbot of Ferns
d. 881	Suibne ua Finsnechtai	
d. 884	Scandal	
d. 888	Lergus mac Cruinnén	Slain in battle by the Danes
d. 931	Crunnmáel	Died 11 December 929 (or 931)
d. 981	Anmchad	
d. 1030	Máel Martain	
d. 1042	Máel Brigte	
d. 1097	Máel Brigte int Sair Ua Broicháin	Styled Bishop of Leinster and Kildare
1097–unknown	Ferdomnach	Styled Bishop of Leinster; resigned the see to Áed Ua hEremóin
d. 1100	Áed Ua hEremóin	
d. 1101	Ferdomnach (again)	Resumed as bishop; died in office
d. 1108	Máel Finnéin mac Donngaile	Abbot of Terryglass and 'chief' bishop of Leinster, but not specifically styled bishop of Kildare
d. 1146	Cormac Ua Cathassaig	
d. 1148	Ua Duibín	

=== Diocesan bishops of Kildare ===
Diocesan Bishops of Kildare
From	Until	Incumbent	Notes
bef. 1152	unknown	Finn mac Máel Muire Mac Cianáin	Bishop at the time of the Synod of Kells in 1152
unknown	1160	Finn mac Gussáin Ua Gormáin	Formerly Abbot of Newry; died in office
bef. 1161	1175	Malachias Ua Brain	Became bishop before 1161; died 1 January 1175
bef. 1177	aft. 1190	Nehemias	Became bishop before 1177; recorded fl. 1080–1190; died after 1190
1206	1223	Cornelius Mac Fáelán	Formerly Archdeacon of Kildare; elected and consecrated bishop in 1206; died before March 1223; also recorded as Cornelius Mac Gelain
1223	1232	Ralph of Bristol	Formerly Treasurer of St Patrick's, Dublin; elected bishop before 12 March 1223; died 24 August 1232
1233	1258	John of Taunton	Formerly a Canon of St Patrick's, Dublin; elected bishop before 6 August 1233; died circa June 1258
1258	1272	Simon of Kilkenny	Formerly a Canon of Kilkenny; elected bishop before 21 October 1258; died April 1272
1272	1279	See vacant	
1279	1299	Nicholas Cusack, O.F.M.	Appointed by the pope on 27 November 1279; consecrated between 15 May and 7 September 1280; died 5 September 1299
1300	1332	Walter Calf	Formerly Chancellor of Kildare; elected bishop before January 1300; died circa 29 November 1332; also recorded as Walter de Veel
1333	1352	Richard Houlot	Formerly Archdeacon of Kildare; elected bishop before May 1333; provided 24 May 1333; consecrated 18 October 1333; died 24 June 1352
1352	1365	Thomas Giffard	Formerly Chancellor of Kildare; elected bishop after June 1352; appointed 21 November 1352; consecrated 31 December 1352; died 25 September 1365
1365	1404	Robert of Aketon, O.E.S.A.	Formerly Bishop-elect of Down; elected Bishop of Kildare on 18 November 1365 and appointed 2 May 1366; resigned before April 1404; also known as Robert of Acton
1404	1431	John Madock	Formerly Archdeacon of Kildare; appointed bishop 9 April 1404; died before July 1431
1431	1446	William fitzEdward	Formerly Archdeacon of Kildare; appointed 20 July 1431 and again 8 August 1431; died April 1446
1447	1464	Geoffrey Hereford, O.P.	Appointed 23 August 1447; consecrated April 1449; acted as suffragan bishop in the Diocese of Hereford; died before 1464
1456/7	1457	John Bole	Elected circa 1456/57; never consecrated; provided Armagh 2 May 1457; also recorded as John Bull
1464	1474	Richard Lang	Appointed (by Pope Pius II) before August 1464; consecrated c.1464; deprived 28 July 1474; acted as a suffragan bishop in the dioceses of Chichester 1480 and Winchester 1488
1474	1475	David Conel	Appointed 28 July 1474; consecrated after 6 September 1474; died before 5 April 1475
1475	unknown	James Wall, O.F.M.	Appointed 5 April 1475; acted as a suffragan bishop in the Diocese of London 1485–1491; died 28 April 1494
unknown	1492	William Barret	Appointment date unknown; acted as a suffragan bishop in the dioceses of Winchester 1502-1525 and the York 1530; resigned before 1492; also recorded as William Barnett
unknown	1513	Edward Lane	Died in office; also known as Edmund Lane
1526	c.1529	Thomas Dillon, O.S.A.	Formerly Prior of St Peter's, Drogheda; appointed 24 August 1526; died before July 1529
1529	1539	Walter Wellesley, O.S.A.	Formerly Prior of Great Connell; appointed 1 July 1529; died before 18 October 1539

== Post-Reformation bishops ==
=== Church of Ireland succession ===
Church of Ireland Bishops of Kildare
From	Until	Incumbent	Notes
1540	1548	William Miagh	Formerly Dean of Kildare; appointed to the see by Henry VIII in opposition to the Pope's appointment; died 15 December 1548
1550	1555	Thomas Lancaster	Nominated 20 April and consecrated July 1550; deprived in 1554 in the reign of Queen Mary I; later became Archbishop of Armagh. Also Dean of Kilkenny in commendam, 1552–1555.
1555	1560	Thomas Leverous ^{[A]}	Formerly Bishop-designate of Leighlin; nominated by Queen Mary I on 1 March 1555 and appointed Bishop of Kildare and Dean of St. Patrick's, Dublin on 30 August 1555; deprived of both posts for refusing to take the Oath of Supremacy in 1560, however, he was still recognized as the Roman Catholic bishop until his death in Naas circa 1577
1560	1564	Alexander Craike	Nominated 17 May 1560; consecrated August 1560; also was Dean of St. Patrick's, Dublin; died before 3 March 1564
1564	1583	Robert Daly	Nominated 16 April and consecrated in May 1564; died sometime between 23 February and 3 July 1583; also recorded as Robert Dale
1583	1603	Daniel Neylan	Nominated 3 July and consecrated in November 1583; died 18 May 1603; also recorded as Donnell O'Neilan
1604	1635	William Pilsworth	Nominated 23 July 1604; consecrated 11 September 1604; died 9 May 1635
1636	1642	Robert Ussher	Nominated 19 October 1635; consecrated 25 February 1636; died 7 September 1642
1644	1650	William Golborne	Nominated 17 May 1644; consecrated 1 December 1644; died 1650
1650	1660	See vacant	
1661	1667	Thomas Price	Nominated 8 October 1660; consecrated 10 March 1661; translated to Cashel 30 May 1667
1667	1678	Ambrose Jones	Nominated 20 April 1667; consecrated 29 June 1667; died 15 December 1678
1679	1682	Anthony Dopping	Nominated 3 January 1679; consecrated 2 February 1679; translated to Meath 11 February 1682
1682	1705	William Moreton	Nominated 14 January 1682; consecrated 19 February 1682; translated to Meath 18 September 1705
1705	1732	Welbore Ellis	Nominated 28 August 1705; consecrated 11 November 1705; translated to Meath 13 March 1732
1731	1743	Charles Cobbe	Translated from Dromore; nominated 18 February 1732; letters patent 16 March 1732; translated to Dublin 4 March 1743
1743	1745	George Stone	Nominated from Ferns and Leighlin; nominated 15 February 1743; letters patent 10 March 1743; translated to Derry 11 May 1745, and subsequently to Armagh 13 March 1747
1745	1761	Thomas Fletcher	Translated from Dromore; nominated 26 April 1745; letters patent 14 May 1745; died 18 March 1761
1761	1765	Richard Robinson	Translated from Ferns and Leighlin; nominated 26 March 1761; letters patent 13 April 1761; translated to Armagh 8 February 1765
1765	1790	Charles Jackson	Nominated 8 February 1765; letters patent 25 February 1765; died 29 March 1790
1790	1804	George Lewis Jones	Translated from Kilmore; nominated 7 May 1790; letters patent 5 June 1790; died 9 March 1804
1804	1846	Hon. Charles Dalrymple Lyndsay	Translated from Killaloe and Kilfenora; nominated 9 May 1804; letters patent 14 May 1804; died 8 August 1846
From 1846 to 1976, the Church of Ireland see was part of the united Diocese of Dublin, Kildare and Glendalough; and since 1976, it has been part of the united Diocese of Meath and Kildare

=== Roman Catholic succession ===
Roman Catholic Bishops of Kildare
From	Until	Incumbent	Notes
1540		Donald O'Beachan, O.F.M.	Appointed 16 July 1540; died shortly afterwards in the same month
1540	unknown	Thady Reynolds	Appointed 15 November 1540; accepted Royal Supremacy and was recognized by King Henry VIII as a suffragan bishop of George Browne, Archbishop of Dublin (Church of Ireland), but not as Bishop of Kildare
1555	1577	Thomas Leverous ^{[B]}	Formerly Bishop-designate of Leighlin; nominated by Queen Mary I on 1 March 1555 and appointed Bishop of Kildare and Dean of St. Patrick's, Dublin on 30 August 1555; deprived of both posts for refusing to take the Oath of Supremacy in 1560, however, he was still recognized as the Roman Catholic bishop until his death in Naas circa 1577
1619	unknown	James Talbot	Appointed Vicar Apostolic by Papal brief 14 September 1619
1622	unknown	Donatus Doolin	Appointed Vicar Apostolic by Papal brief 14 January 1622
1628	c.1641/44	Roche MacGeoghegan, O.P.	Appointed 5 May 1628 and again 12 February 1629; died circa 1641 and 1644
1665	unknown	James Dempsey	Vicar Apostolic, provided 24 November 1665
1671	unknown	Patrick Dempsey	Vicar Apostolic, provided 30 June 1671
1676	1683	Mark Forestal O.S.A.	Appointed 8 October 1676; appointed administrator of the Diocese of Leighlin on 5 September 1678; died 7 February 1683
From 1683 to 1694, the bishops of Kildare were administrators of the bishopric of Leighlin.
1683	1693	Edward Wesley	Appointed 2 August 1683; died 1693
1694	c.1707	John Dempsey	Appointed 8 February 1694; became bishop of Kildare and Leighlin when the two were united on 29 November 1694; died circa 1707
Since 1694, the Roman Catholic see of Kildare has been amalgamated with Leighlin to form the current united bishopric of Kildare and Leighlin

== See also ==
- Church of Ireland Diocese of Meath and Kildare
- Roman Catholic Diocese of Kildare and Leighlin
- Kildare Cathedral

== Notes ==
- ^{A} ^{B} Thomas Leverous was bishop of both successions when they were briefly reunited in the reign of Queen Mary I.
