= List of abbots and abbesses of Kildare =

The following is a list of abbots and abbesses of Kildare, heads of Kildare Abbey, founded — according to tradition — by Saint Brigit.

== List of abbesses ==
- Brigit ingen Dubthaig, d. 1 February either 521, 524, or 526
- Abbesses of unknown death year alleged to have followed Brigit
  - Der Lugdach, commemorated 1 February
  - Comnat, commemorated 1 January
  - Tuilclath, commemorated 6 January
- Gnáthnat (or Gnáthat), d. 690
- Sébdann ingen Cuirc, d. 732
- Affraic (or Aiffrica), d. 743
- Martha ingen maic Dubáin, d. 758
- Lerthan, d. 773
- Condál ingen Murchado, d. 797
- Fine, d. 805
- Muirenn ingen Cellaig, d. 831
- Affraic, d. 834
- Cathán, d. 855
- Tuilelaith ingen Uargalaig, d. 10 January, 885
- Cobflaith ingen Duib Dúin, d. 916
- Muirenn ingen Suairt, d. 26 May, 918
- Muirenn ingen Flannacáin meic Colmáin, d. 964
- Muirenn ingen Congalaig, d. 979
- Eithne ingen Suairt, d. 1016
- Lann ingen meic Selbacháin, d. 1047
- Dub Dil, d. 1072
- Gormlaith ingen Murchada, d. 1112
- Ingen Cerbaill meic Fáeláin, deposed 1127
- Mór ingen Domnaill Uí Chonchobair Failge, deposed 1132/d. 1167
- Sadb ingen Glúniarain Meic Murchada, d. 1171

== List of abbots ==
- Áed Dub mac Colmáin, d. 639
- Óengus mac Áedo Find, unknown dates
- Brandub mac Fiachrach, unknown dates
- Lóchéne Mend Sapiens, d. 696
- Do Dímmóc, d. march 3, 748
- Cathal mac Forindáin, d. 752
- Muiredach mac Cathail, d. 787
- Eódus ua Dícolla, d. 798
- Fáelán mac Cellaig, d. 804
- Muiredach mac Cellaig, d. 823
- Áed mac Cellaig, d. 828
- Siadal mac Feradaig, d. 830
- Artrí mac Fáeláin, d. 852
- Cellach mac Ailello, d. 865
- Cobthach mac Muiredaig, d. 870
- Muiredach mac Brain, d. 885
- Tuathal mac Ailbi, d. 886
- Dubán, d. 905
- Flannacán ua Riacáin, d. 922
- Cuilén mac Cellaig, d. 955
- Cairbe Ua Guaire, d. 963
- Muiredach mac Fáeláin, d. 967
