= Thomas Leverous =

Irish Roman Catholic priest

Thomas Leverous (1487–1577) was a 16th Century Roman Catholic priest.

Leverous was a foster brother to Gerald FitzGerald, the 9th Earl of Kildare. He held livings at Laraghbrine, Kerdiffstown and Maynooth. Queen Mary I appointed him Archdeacon of Armagh in 1554 (held to 1456); Bishop of Kildare on 1 March 1555; and Dean of St. Patrick's, Dublin on 30 August 1555. He was deprived of both posts for refusing to take the Oath of Supremacy in 1560, however, he was still recognized as the Roman Catholic bishop until his death in Naas in 1577.
