= Michael Colgan =

Michael Colgan may refer to:

- Michael Colgan (actor), Northern Irish actor
- Michael Colgan (nutritionist), biochemist and physiologist nutritionist
- Michael Colgan (director) (born 1950), Irish theatre director and producer
- Michael Colgan (politician) (died 1953), Irish independent politician
