= William Golborne =

Irish Anglican bishop

William Golborne (sometimes Golbourn) was a Bishop of Kildare.

Golborne was from Chester. Nominated to the see on 17 May 1644, he was consecrated on 1 December that year.
