= Walter Wellesley =

Irish cleric and judge

Walter Wellesley (c.1470–1539) was a sixteenth-century Irish cleric and judge. He was Prior of Great Connell Priory, Bishop of Kildare 1529-39, and Master of the Rolls in Ireland 1531-2.

== Background and early career ==
He was born about 1470, the second son of Sir William Wellesley (c.1443-1502) of Dangan, County Meath and his wife Ismay, daughter of Sir Thomas Fitz-Christopher Plunket, Lord Chief Justice of Ireland and his second wife Marian Cruise. The Wellesley family had come to Ireland from Wells in Somerset in the 1220s, and settled in Kildare and Meath.

Walter was educated at the University of Oxford, and was said to have been one of the outstanding scholars of his time. He became an Augustinian friar, and sometime before 1520 became prior of their house at Great Connell near Newbridge, County Kildare. For the rest of his life, he never wavered in his devotion to the welfare of the Priory.

== Bishop ==
Wellesley was called a man who "had a singular mind towards the maintenance of English rule in Ireland", and as a result, he enjoyed the trust of Henry VIII. Henry proposed him as Bishop of Limerick, but the choice was rejected by the Pope. In 1520 Surrey, the Lord Deputy of Ireland, suggested him as Bishop of Cork, but Wellesley himself rejected the proposal when he was told that, if he accepted the see of Cork, he could not remain Prior of his beloved Great Connell. Finally, in 1529 he became Bishop of Kildare, on the condition he could also remain Prior. He was Master of the Rolls in 1521-2.

== Suppression of Great Connell ==
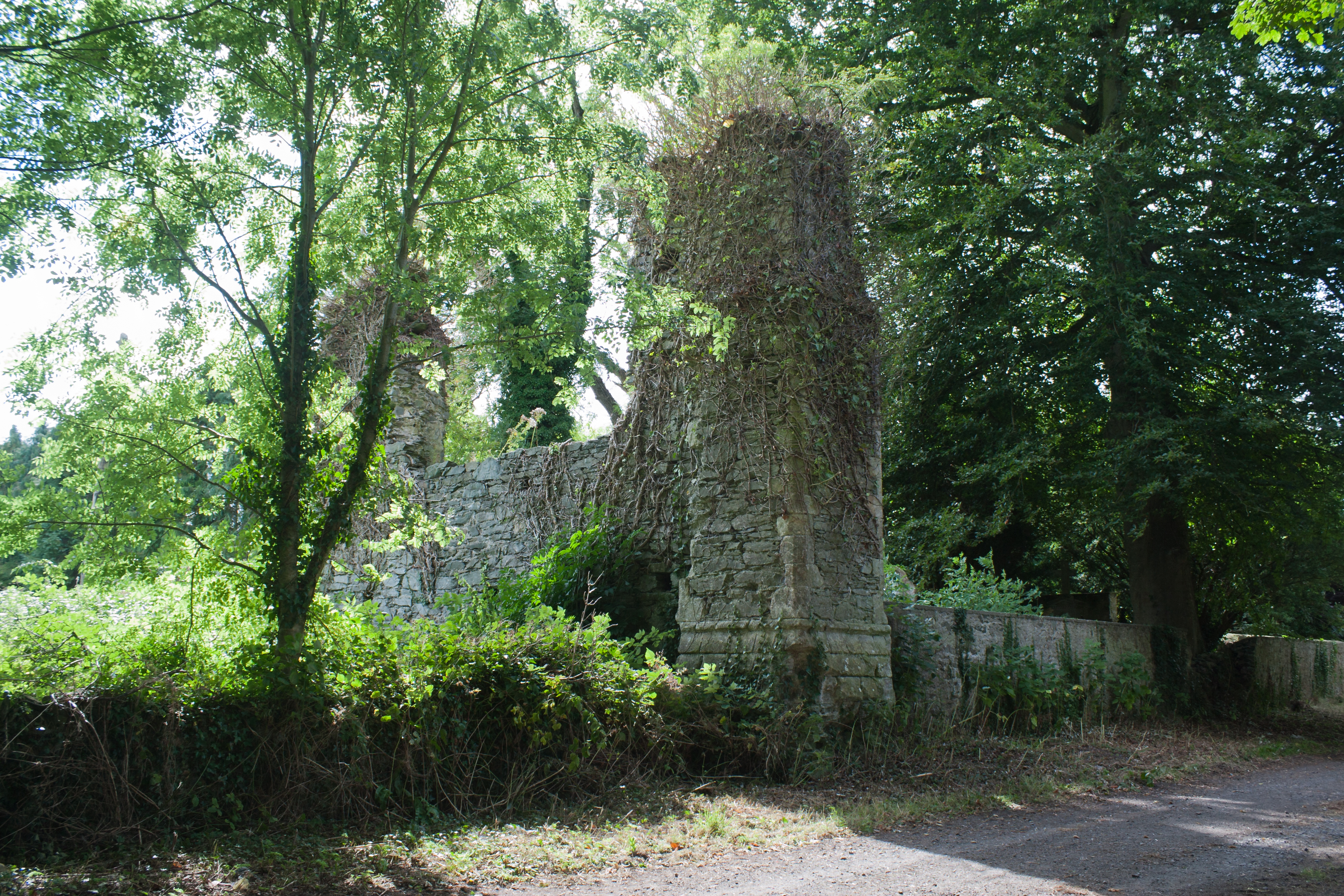
A surviving remnant of the east window of Great Connell Priory

Though he was trusted by the Crown to carry out its policies faithfully, Wellesley showed little enthusiasm for the Reformation. At the Dissolution of the Monasteries, his great concern was to ensure the survival of Great Connell. In 1537 he asked for it to be exempted from confiscation on the ground that it was part of the Diocese of Kildare. His assurance to Thomas Cromwell that "no brother is elected unless he be of the English nation" was not necessarily a sign of anti-Irish prejudice, since monasteries within the Pale were not permitted to admit Irish monks, and he may simply have been stressing that Great Connell observed this rule strictly.

Wellesley's influence with the King was great enough to ensure the survival of Great Connell for a few more years, but two years after his death the last Prior surrendered it. The lands were granted to Edward Randolfe, and later passed to the eminent judge Nicholas White, and the priory was allowed to fall into ruin.

== Death and memorials ==
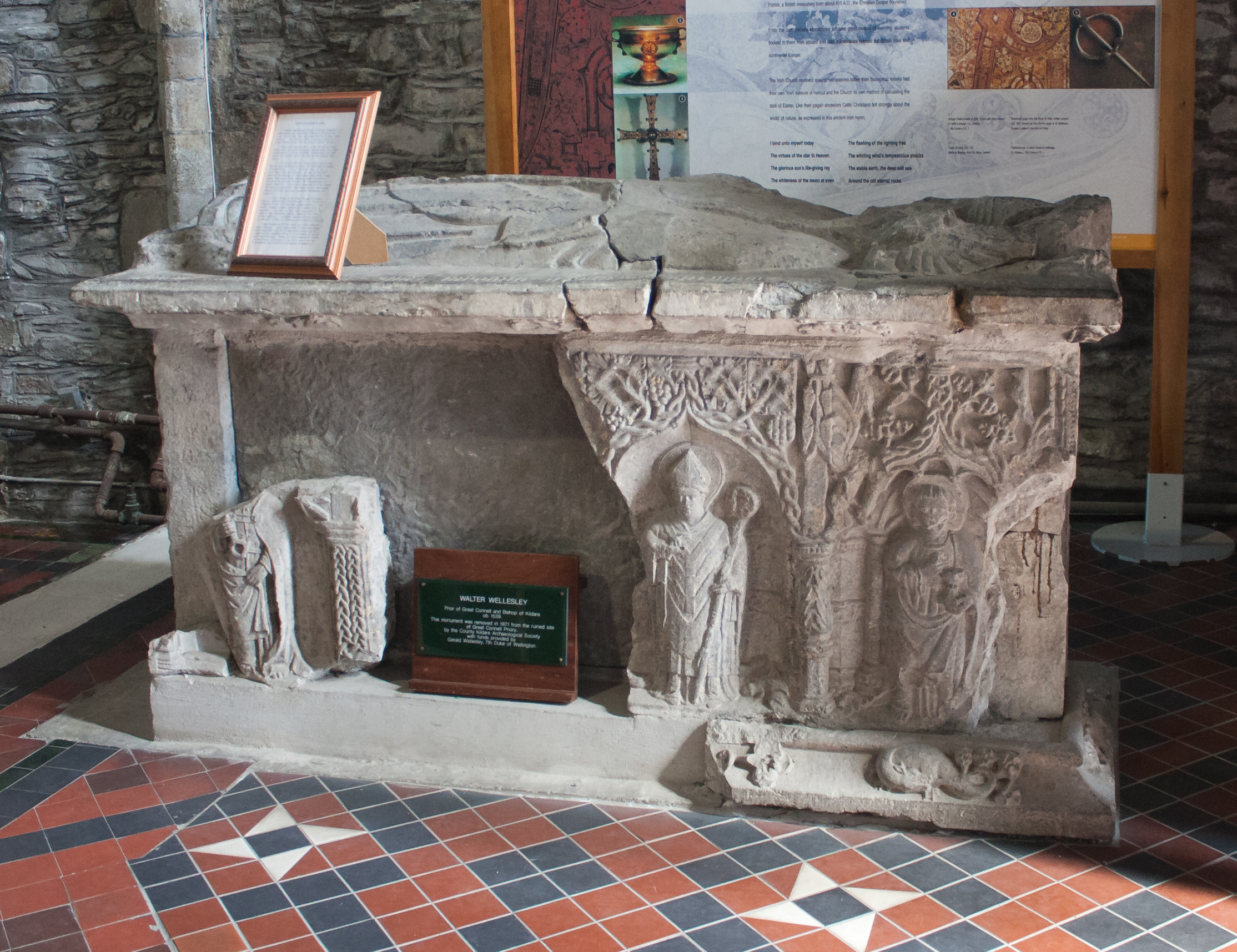
Tomb of Walter Wellesley; since 1971 it is in the south transept of Kildare Cathedral

Wellesley died in October 1539 and was buried in Great Connell where an impressive effigy was erected to his memory. After the dissolution of the priory the tomb was lost: it was finally rediscovered by the Kildare Archaeological Society in 1971. The restored tomb is now in Kildare Cathedral.

== Character ==
Bishop Wellesley was described as a man of "gravity and virtuous conversation", the most famous scholar in Ireland in his time, and a firm upholder of English rule.
