= Ralph of Bristol =

Ralph of Bristol (died 24 August 1232), also known as Radulphus de Bristollia, was the bishop of Kildare. He had previously acted as treasurer of St. Patrick's Cathedral, Dublin, adding sufficient ornamentation that allowed it to be converted into a cathedral. Ralph was appointed bishop of Kildare, the first Englishman to hold the post and instructed that Kildare Cathedral be rebuilt as it was in near ruins.

== Works ==
Ralph was born in Bristol, before moving to Dublin. Here, by 1200, he had become a canon at St Patrick's and was appointed first treasurer of the cathedral by the Archbishop Henry of London, going on to be witness for a number of Henry's charters. As treasurer, Ralph is credited with the repair and ornamentation of St. Patrick's, leading it to be converted into a full cathedral - St Patrick's Cathedral, Dublin.

Ralph was also a clerk of William de Payvo, bishop of Glendalough, from whom he received half the church of Salmonleap, with a pension of half a mark from Conephy.

In 1223, he was consecrated bishop of Kildare, the first Englishman to take the role. After him, there was a line of English and Anglo-Irish bishops which carried on for 200 years. Kildare Cathedral was at this time in near ruins and Ralph is credited with rebuilding it. At the same time, he was responsible for replacing monks who had dedicated themselves to St. Brigit of Kildare with Augustine priests and built churches dedicated to other saints.

Henry of London gave Ralph the task to write the biography of St. Laurence O'Toole, the archbishop of Dublin, collecting together all evidence of his sanctity and miracles to allow for the saint's beatification and canonization. The collection is preserved in Trinity College, Dublin.
