= St David's Church, Naas =

St David's Church
- Teampall Dháithí, Nás na Ríogh
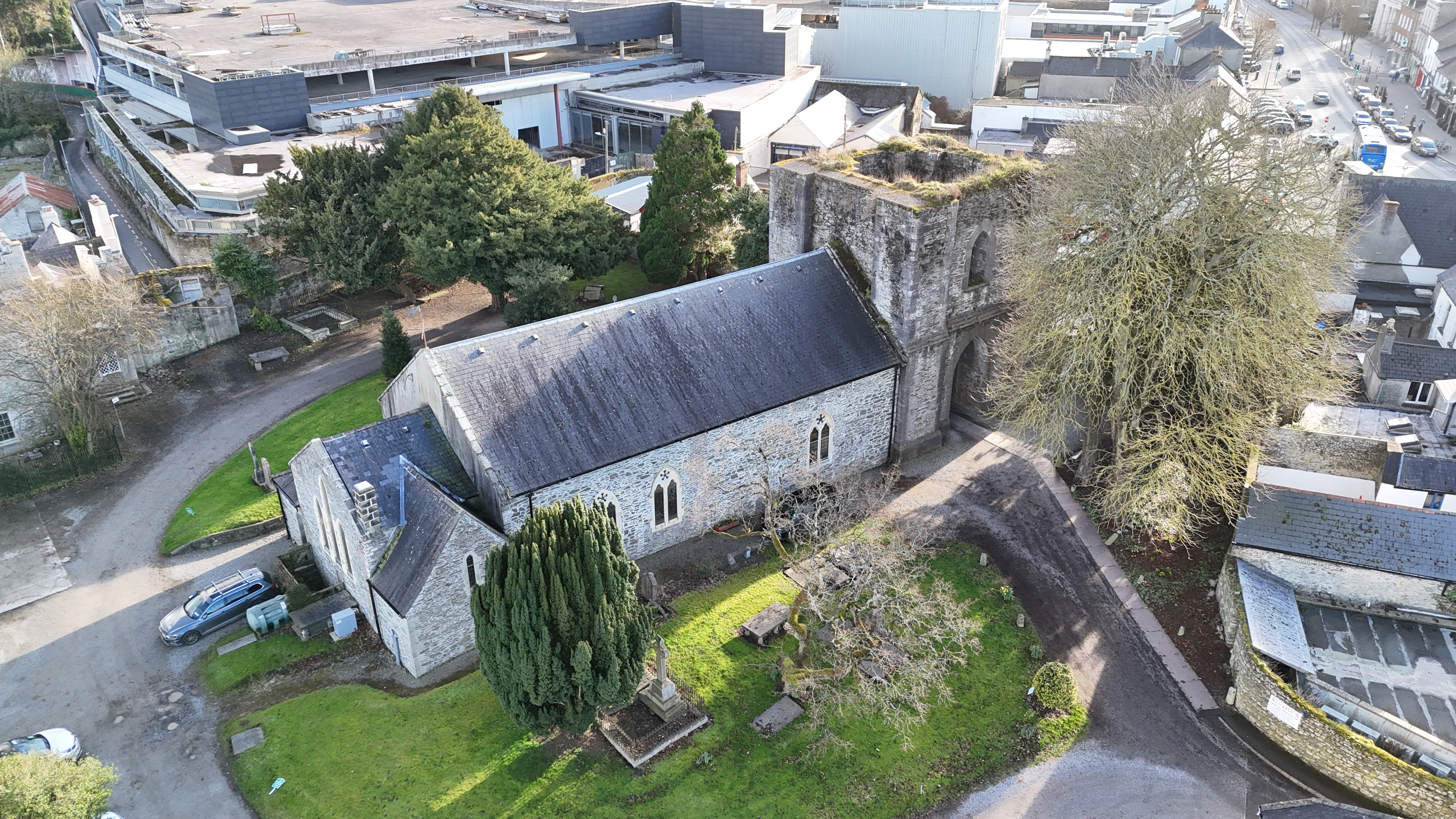

- Location within Ireland
- 53.218104°N 6.662576°W
- Location: 28 North Main Street, Naas, County Kildare
- Country: Ireland
- Denomination: Church of Ireland
- Previous denomination: Pre-reformation
- Churchmanship: Anglican

History
- Status: Open
- Founded: 1212
- Dedication: St. David

Architecture
- Functional status: active
- Architectural type: Norman
- Years built: c. 1212

Specifications
- Length: 40 m (130 ft)
- Width: 12.5 m (41 ft)

Administration
- Province: Province of Dublin
- Diocese: Meath and Kildare

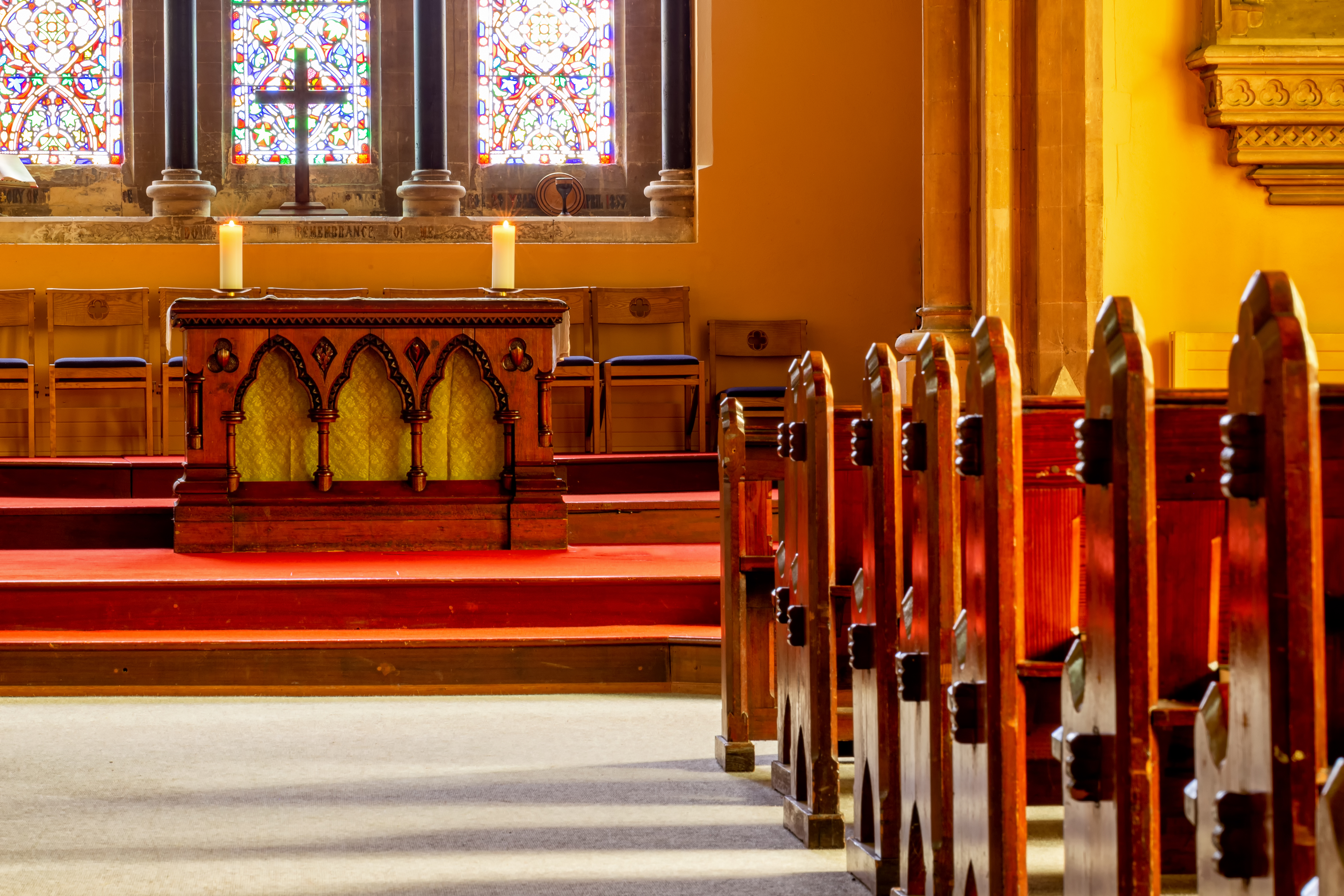
Wooden hand carved Communion Table at St. Davids Naas

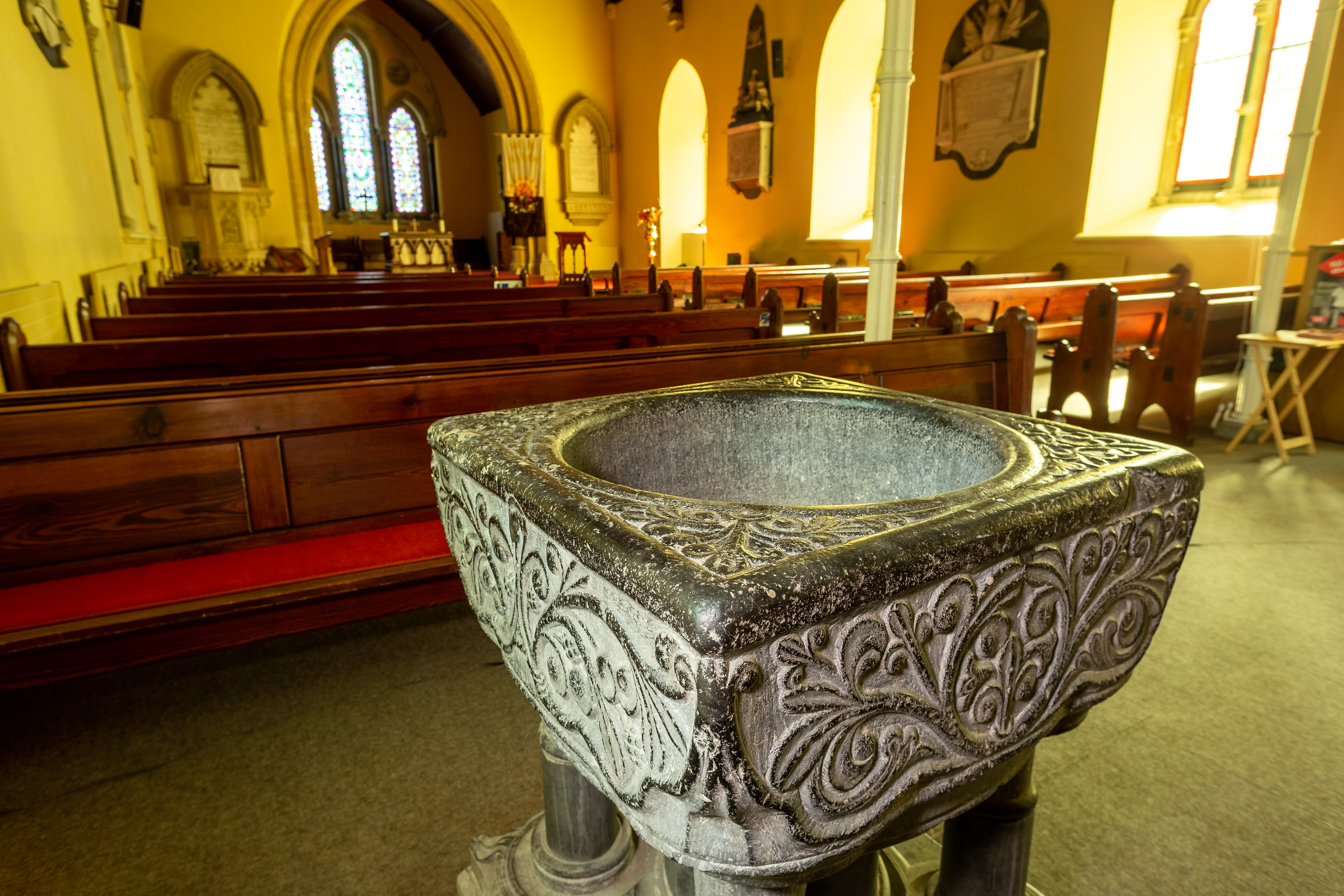
Medieval Baptismal Font at St. Davids Naas

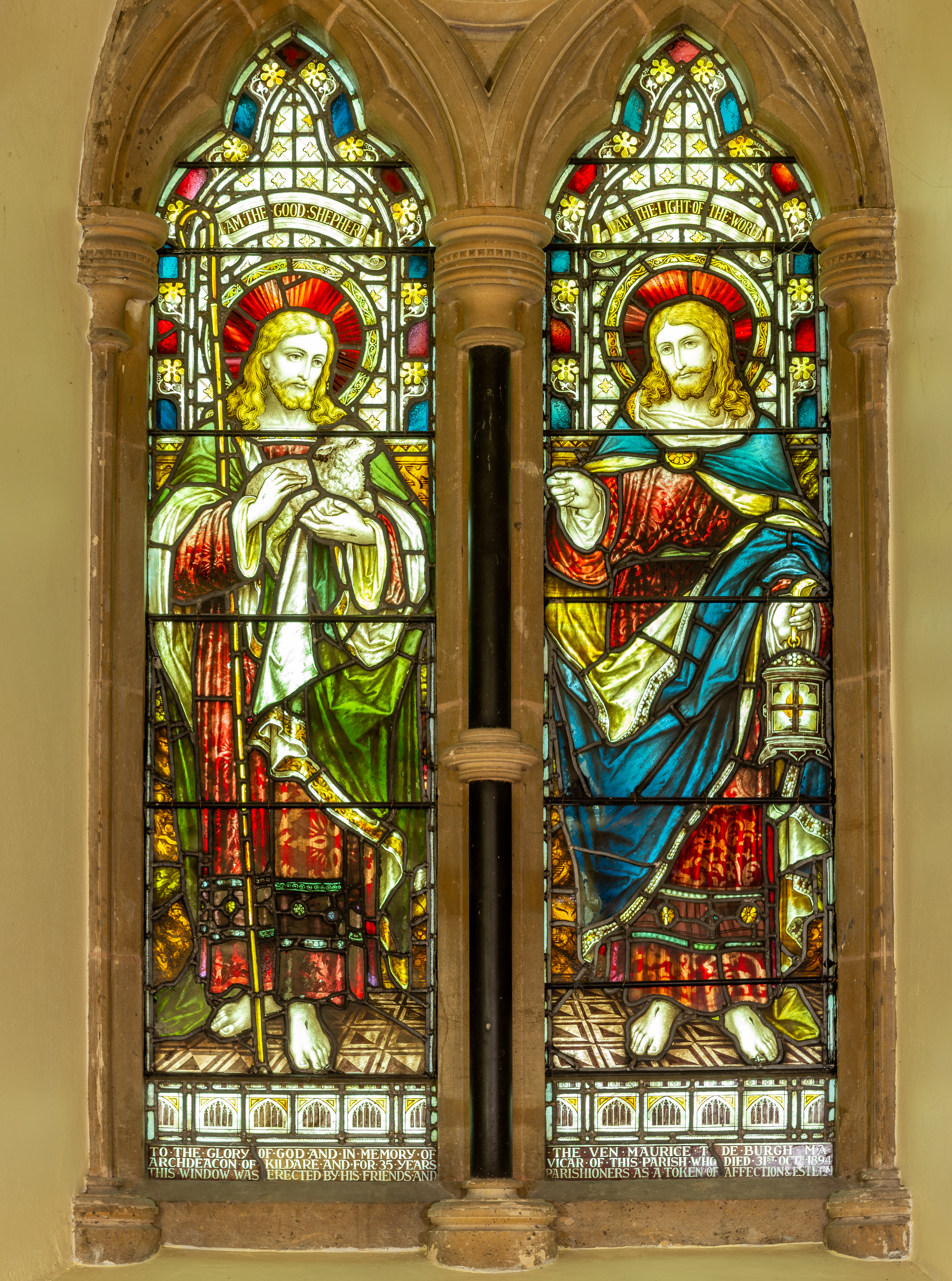
Good Shepherd and Light of the World Stained glass window

St David's Church, Naas is a Church of Ireland church in Naas, Ireland.

== Location ==
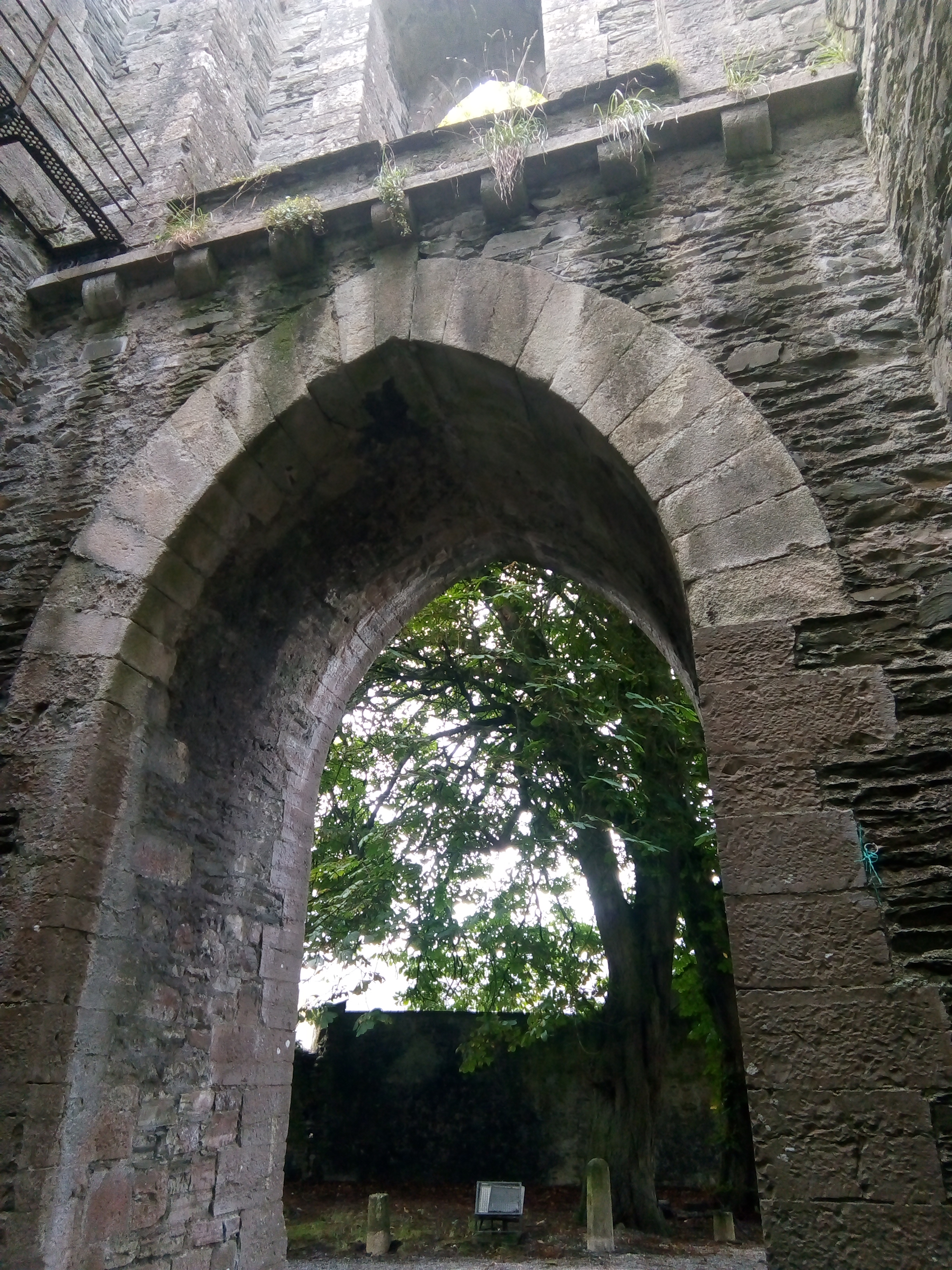
Archway under the (incomplete) tower.

St David's Church is located in the center of Naas, on the east side of North Main Street, 160 m (170 yd) southeast of the Moat of Naas. It is not to be confused with Naas's Roman Catholic church, which is called the Church of Our Lady and Saint David.

== History ==
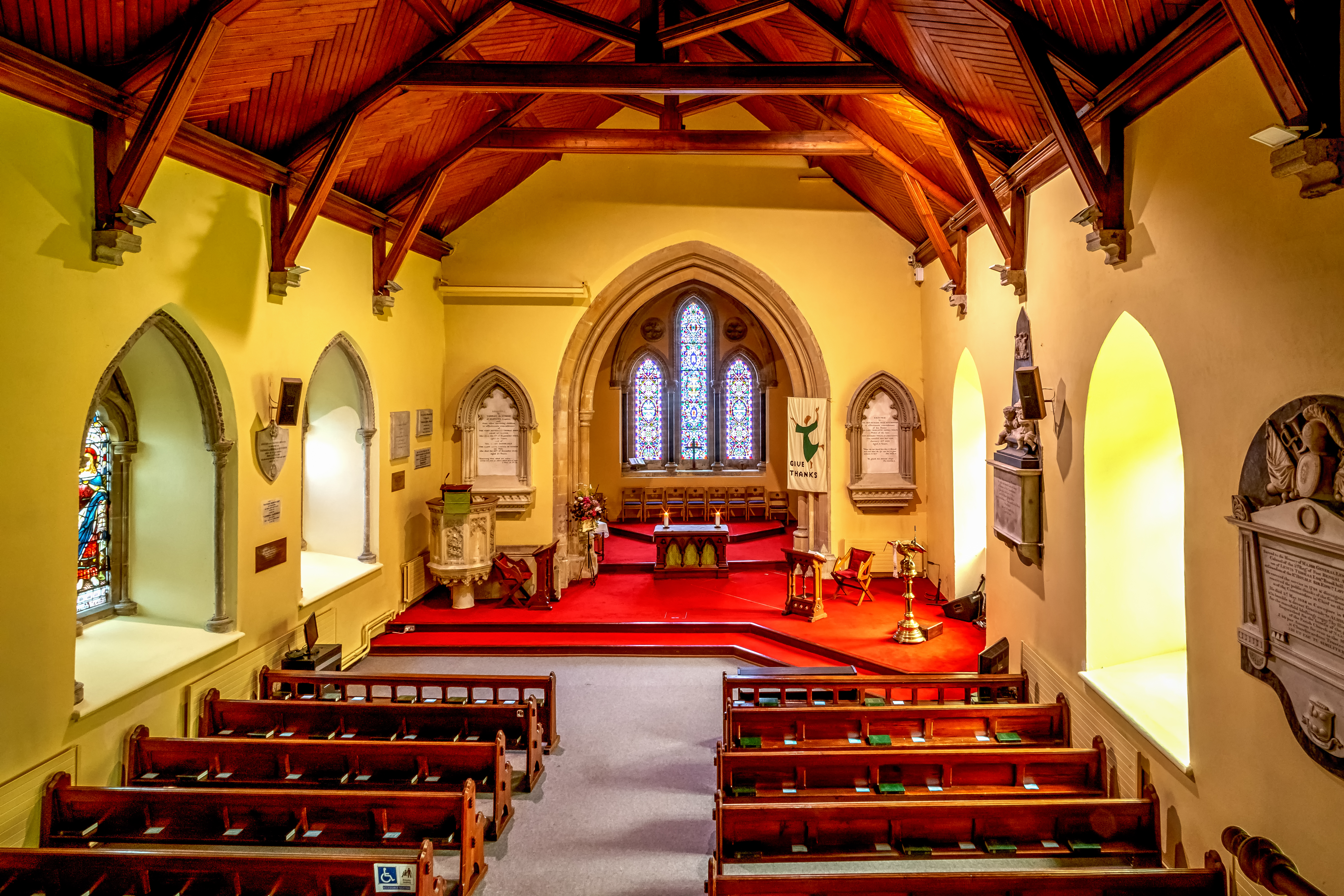
Interior of St. David's Church Naas, County Kildare, Ireland

St David's Church was built on the site of an earlier Celtic Christian church dedicated to Saint Corban or St Patrick. Following the Norman conquest of Ireland (1169–75), William Fitzmaurice and the Cambro-Norman barons who settled in the Naas area rebuilt the church and dedicated it Saint David, patron saint of Wales. Up until about 1800 it was the custom in Naas to wear a leek on 1 March in honour of the saint.

In 1212 St David's was listed as one of the possessions of the Knights Hospitaller. By 1606, when St David's featured in the inquisition of James I, contained three chantries – Holy Trinity, St Mary, and St Catherine. The priests were appointed by the burgesses and provost of the town. William Pilsworth was named vicar in 1604. In 1620 the current building was constructed, incorporating much of the old Norman church. By 1767 the steeple was in a ruinous state and was pulled down. Joseph Bourke, 3rd Earl of Mayo decided to replace it but never completed the new tower; a plaque on the inside wall of the tower states "I found a ruin and left a steeple, Mayo 1783″.

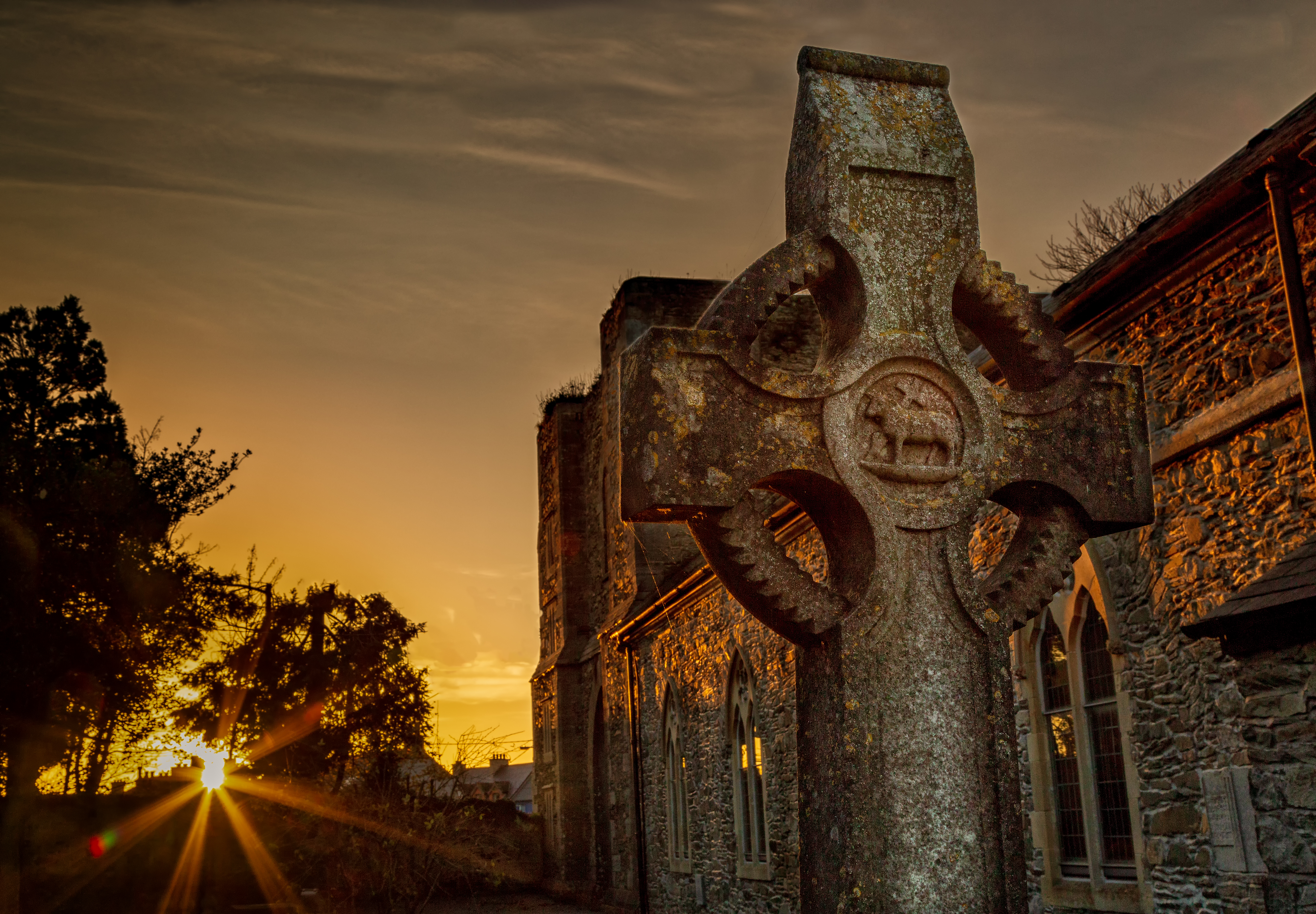
Celtic Cross at St. David's Church Naas

The bell dates from 1674 and originally hung in the old steeple. The baptismal font is believed to be very old, predating the Norman church.

The church was excavated by T. Fanning in 1987–91, with many medieval tiles found.

Early Christians in Naas and the date of the present building

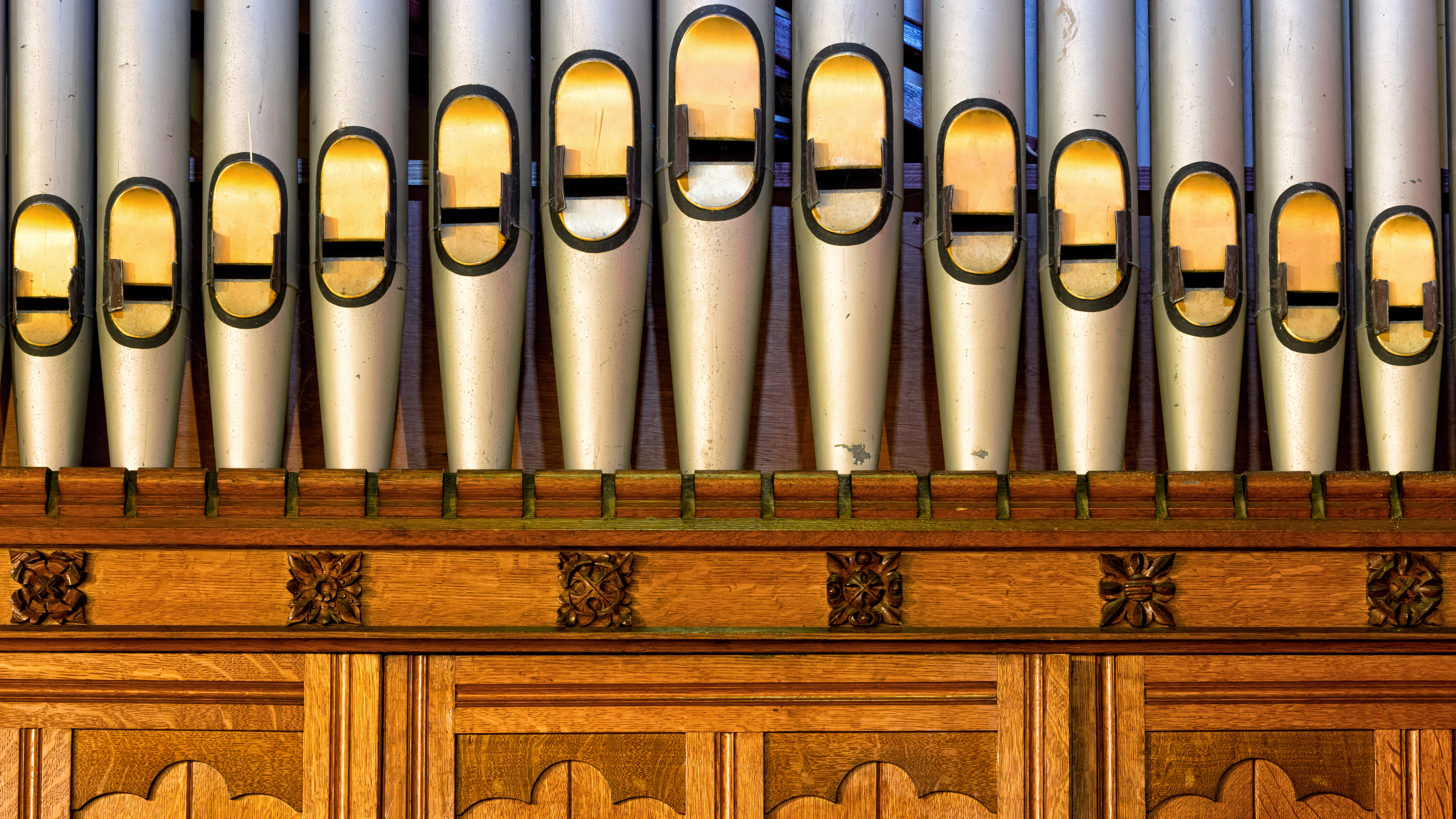
Decorated Organ Pipes at St. David's Naas

The stone structure of the church can be dated to around 1212 when we find the first recorded reference to St David's church listed as a possession of the Hospitallers of St John of Jerusalem.

However, there was a Christian witness in Naas long before the existing building. St Patrick is said to have visited the present site in the 5th century, where an early wooden church was constructed soon afterwards. The church at that time was probably dedicated to St Patrick or St Corban. In 1175, Naas was occupied by Anglo Normans of Welsh extraction who constructed the present building. St David is the patron saint of Wales and they felt that it was fitting to re-dedicate the newly constructed church to their national saint.

Design of the building

In 1606 the church was mentioned in the Inquisition of James 1 which noted that it had expanded to contain three chanceries – The Holy Trinity, St Mary's and St Katherine.

Thomas Drew R.H.A. writing in 1878 conjectured that the Protestant settlers established in Naas by the Duke of Ormond in 1648 probably altered the church in many respects according to the Jacobean style. In 1789 the sum of £118.11s3d was expended on the roof. In 1830 major work was carried out, including the addition of the wooden ceiling.

The building was completely renovated in 1989-1993 and subsequently there has been a constant effort of conservation and improvement, such as the renovation of the sanctuary in 2009, the tower in 2015 and ongoing work in the churchyard.

The church is one foot wider at the east end, than at the west end, and the east wall is remarkably out of square, the south wall being about two feet longer than the north wall. The chancel has the appearance of inclining to the north side. This is common to many medieval buildings. One theory is that it mimics the head of Christ tilted on the cross. Another theory is that medieval builders deliberately left some form of imperfection in the building as no one is perfect but God alone. There may have been a building or wall from an earlier church whose orientation did not happen to suit the ideas of the Welshmen, or they may have built the church close to an existing wall without regard to it being square.

There is a lack of significant architectural evidence due to the centuries of plundering inflicted upon this historic building. From Edward Bruce in 1316 to Rory Og O’Moore in 1577, and throughout the seventeenth and eighteenth centuries, the building was ransacked, burned and despoiled, but survived it all.

1. The Baptismal Font

The Baptismal font dates to the 11th century and is a fine example of its period, predating the present church. Its black marble is decorated with leaf shaped ornaments representing God's creative power and Christ's in-dwelling in our lives through baptism. This font may be regarded as an important relic of the Celtic Christian Church. It was found abandoned in the church grounds around 1860 by Archdeacon De Burgh, who brought it into the church, where it rested on props of turned wood for many years before restoration by Thomas Drew in 1878. This font is still used regularly today for baptisms and is a visual reminder of our Celtic heritage and history.

2. The Memorials

The memorial on the south wall is dedicated to the Earl of Mayo, stipulating a bequest of £20 per annum forever to the trustees of the Church.

On the north side there are two plaques dedicated to the Eustace Family of Robertstown.

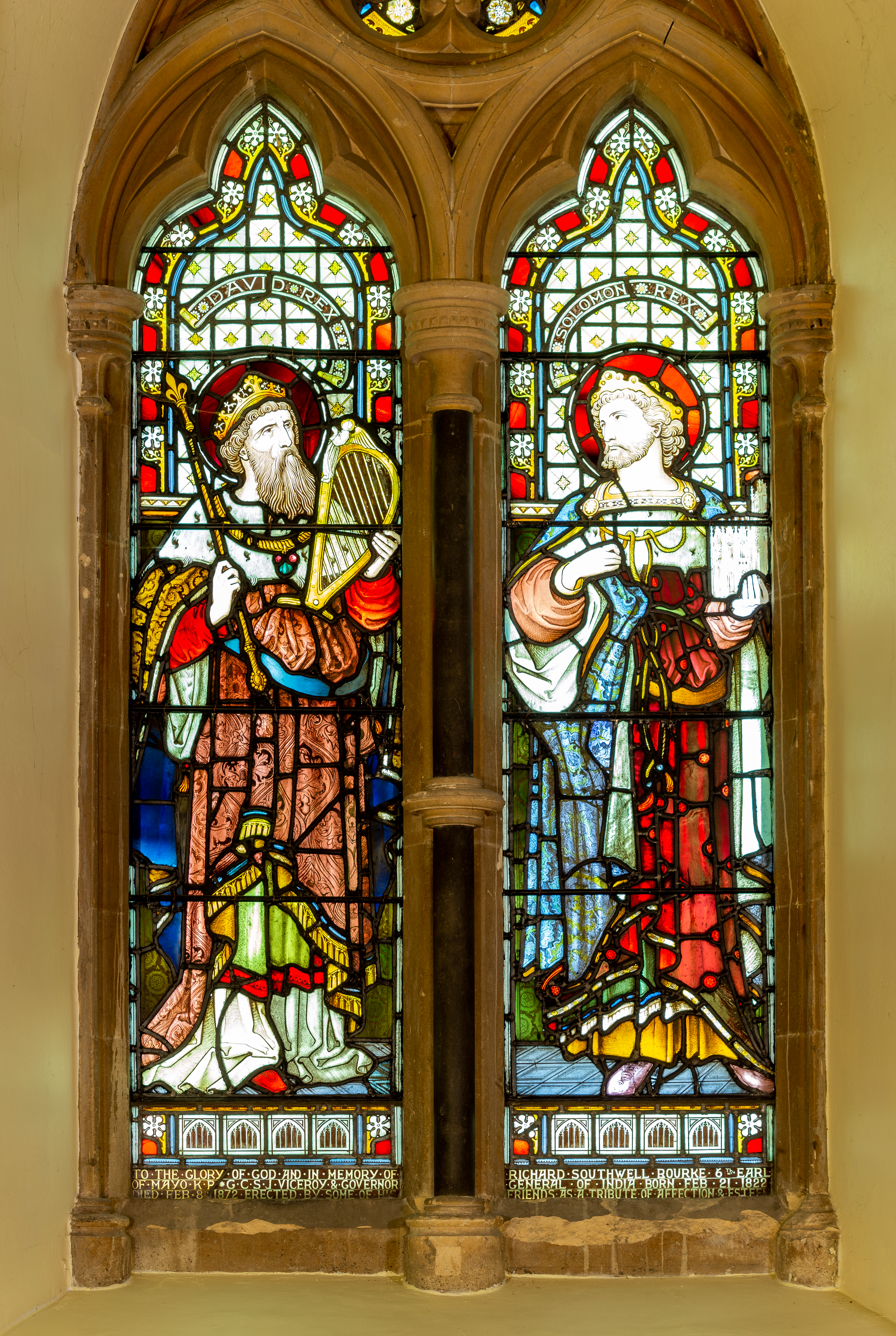
King Solomon & King David Stained Glass at St. Davids Naas

Also on the north side are memorials dedicated to The De Burgh Family. The De Burgh's came to Naas in 1700.

On the Chancel Wall the Wolfe Family of Forenaughts are remembered.

The Brass Eagle was presented by the De Robeck family who dedicated it to the memory of Coralie.

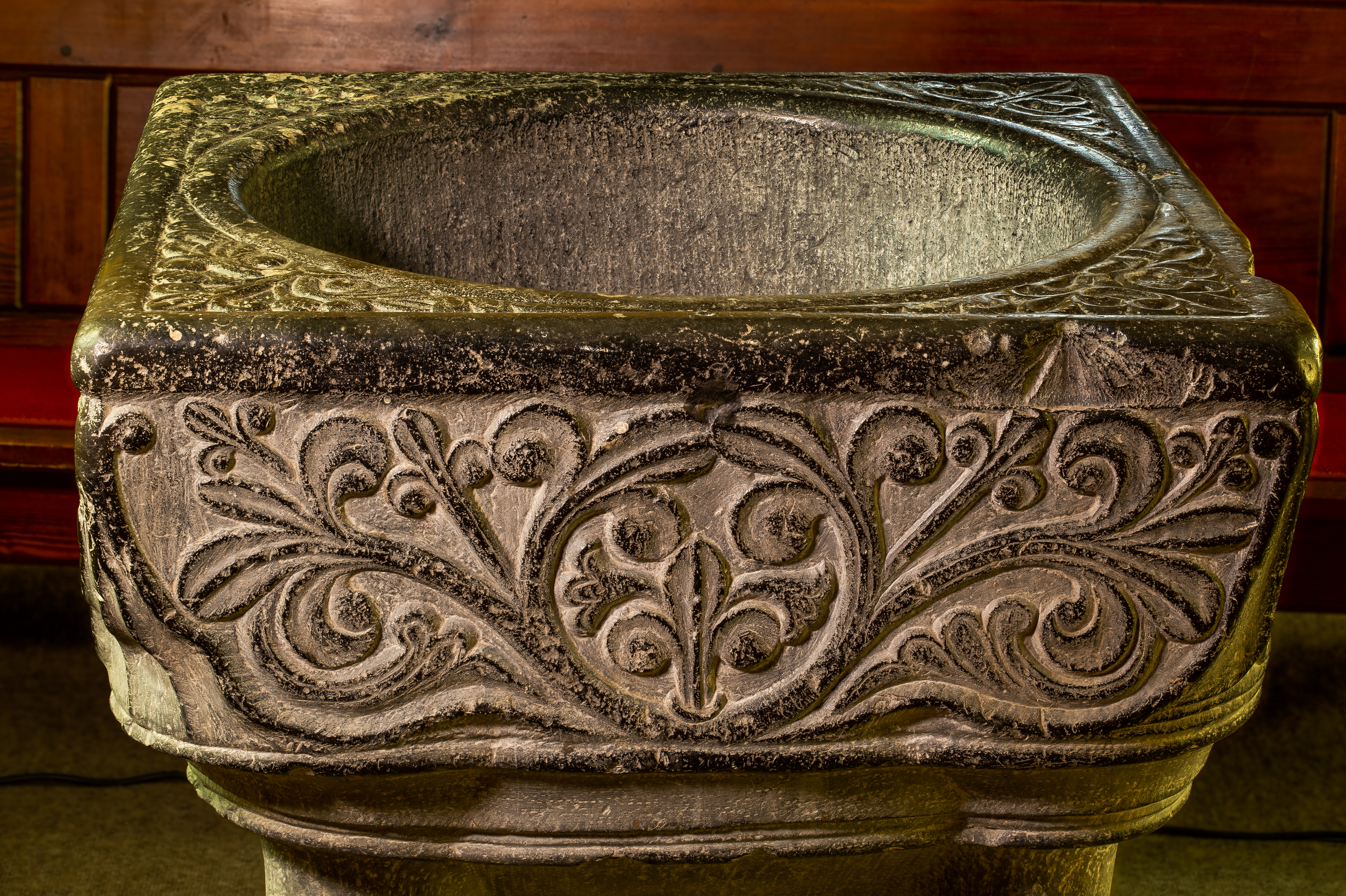
Detail of stone Medieval Font at St. Davids Naas

Many of the dedicated plaques that hang on the back gallery wall came from Killashee Church which was closed in the 1950s.

3. Stained Glass Windows

The three light window in the Sanctuary of the Church is of French origin and dates to the 19th century.

There are two, two light windows in the Nave depicting Christ the light of the world, Christ as the Good Shepherd, King David and King Solomon. These windows are from Heaton, Butler and Bayne, and are dated 1882 and 1894.

4. The Gallery

To mark the end of the 1989/1993 restoration, the Naas Quilters made and gifted a beautiful silk quilted cross to the church. They were inspired by the tiles on the floor dating from the 1830 restoration. These tiles are now covered with carpet to protect them.

The Gallery was restored in 1997 in memory of Martin De Robeck.

The organ pipes are a remnant of the Conacher organ that once stood in the present day side chapel. The organ was dated 1901 but was beyond repair. Where this old organ stood we now have a beautiful space in which many intimate prayer services are held.

5. The Crypt

The crypt is a honeycombed foundation structure under the church. In the 1980s, workers were digging outside on the south side of the church and came upon a wall of old brick some feet below the surface An opening was made where once an archway had given access to a sizeable

L-shaped room.

The crypt was the resting place of five coffins: three male, one female and one child. The remains were those of the Mansfield family from Morristown Lattin and had lain undisturbed for over 300 years. They have since been buried in St Maudlin's Cemetery. Also halfway down the church on the south side another tiny crypt area was discovered with a number of skeletal remains. The remaining crypt had been filled with rubble prior to this restoration. There may well be more such crypts under the church and in the graveyard. One fascinating theory is that there was a tunnel running from the church to the Moate in Naas and that the church may at one stage have had a series of vaults running underneath it.

Ancient Baptismal Font

The granite Baptismal Font preserved in the crypt is from early Christian times and would have been in use until the 11th century.

The Sandstone Slab

The Carpenter Tomb slab in red sandstone was removed from the sanctuary to be preserved in the crypt. The wording is: 1655 Joshua Carpenter born at Lyme Devonshire in 1585 died in Denmark 1655 and was brought back here to be buried. Joshua Carpenter was involved as a stewart with Wentworth in the building of Jigginstown Castle on the Newbridge Road.

6. The Sanctuary and Side Chapel

In 2009, work was undertaken to conserve and enhance the sanctuary. The remnants of the non-functional organ were relocated to the West Wall above the gallery. The organ room had to be completely renovated with new plastering, flooring and the excavation of a further underground area that housed the bellows of the organ. This created an intimate space which is used for midweek services and private prayer. The Victorian tiles, were covered with carpet to protect them and removable staging was constructed to enable the church to adapt to 21st century worship. The Pew runners were replaced and sanctuary chairs purchased in memory of loved ones. New lights and electrical sockets were installed along with a new sound system and associated wiring. The electronic organ was moved to the back of the church and the interior of the building was completely re-painted. The Multimedia projector was installed in 2007.

The pulpit dates from the 19th century and in 2011 was given a facelift by the addition of wooden facing and lectern in memory of Jim Keyes.

The 19th century communion table, which had previously been concealed by an ancient fabric covering, was stripped back to its wood. Please note how the table imitates the delicate stone carvings and symbols of the West Windows. These quatrefoil motifs are echoed on the sanctuary carpet and chairs.

Churchyard

In 1672 the churchyard was railed in for the first time, but it remained a sort of thoroughfare until 1679. There are a number of notable burials in the churchyard such as a stone dedicated to the Brophy brothers, who were killed in the ill-fated Emmet Rebellion 1803.

Stand and look at the Church (southside) and notice the architectural Norman design of the church omitting the tower.

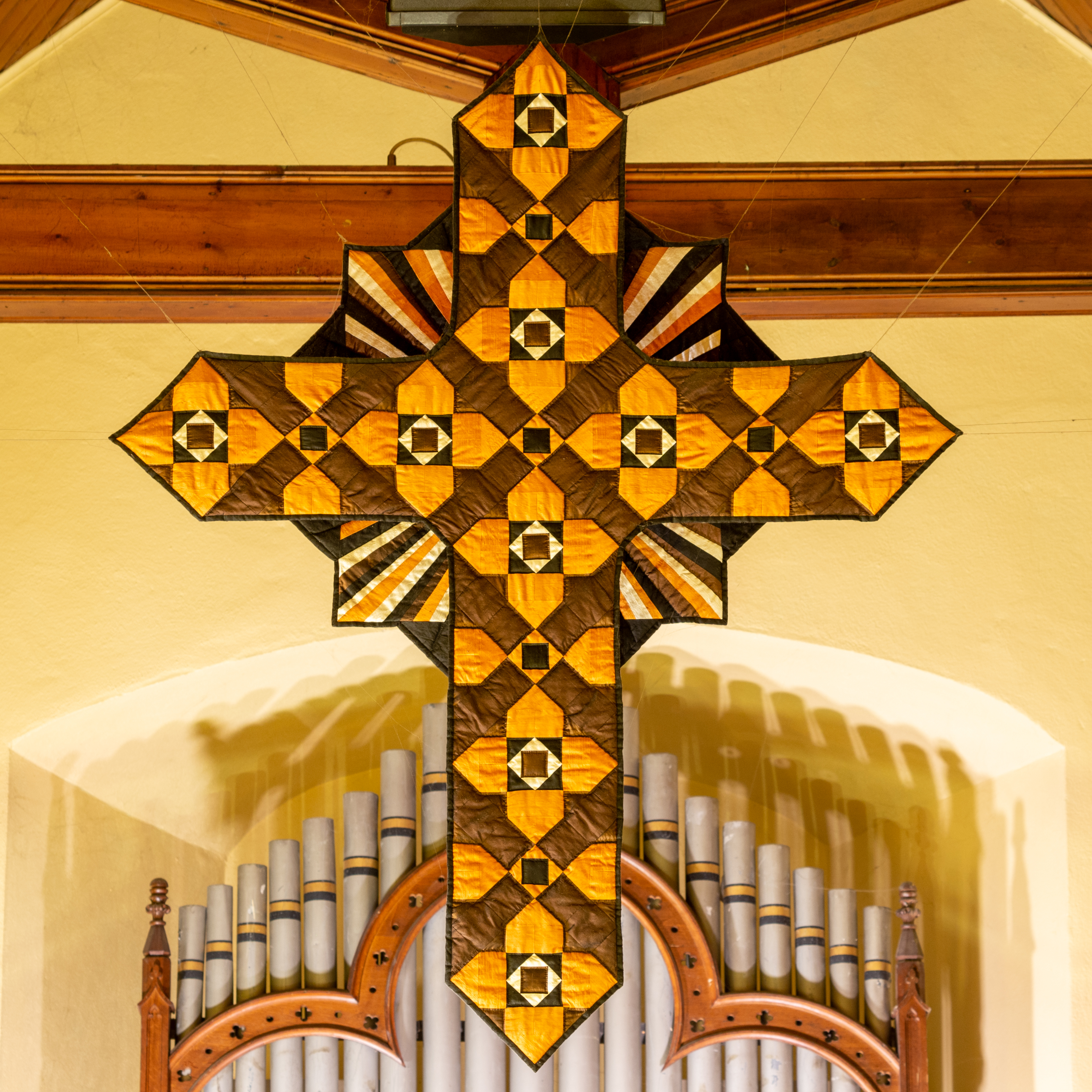
Quilted Silk hanging cross at St. David's Naas

The outline of the crypt is still visible outside at the south side of the church. Above this there is a memorial plaque and in its dedication are a number of spelling mistakes. If you look closely you will see where the spellings were corrected.
