= Gerry Colgan =

Scottish footballer

Personal information
- Full name: Gerry Colgan
- Date of birth: 20 June 1951
- Place of birth: Coatbridge, Scotland
- Date of death: 5 February 2011 (aged 59)
- Place of death: Glasgow, Scotland
- Positions: Left back; left winger

Youth career
- Strathclyde University

Senior career*
Years	Team	Apps	(Gls)
1971–1977	Queen's Park	146	(22)
1977–1981	Clydebank	99	(5)
1981–1983	Hamilton Academical	25	(0)
1982–1983	East Stirlingshire	1	(0)
- * Club domestic league appearances and goals

Gerry Colgan (20 June 1951 – 5 February 2011) was a Scottish amateur footballer who made over 140 appearances as a left back and left winger in the Scottish League for Queen's Park. He also played for Clydebank, Hamilton Academical and East Stirlingshire.

== Personal life ==
Colgan attended Strathclyde University and began teaching chemistry at St Patrick's High School in Coatbridge in 1973. He moved to St Andrew's High School in East Kilbride in 1978 and progressed to become the senior deputy head teacher. He later moved to the same role at the merged St Andrew's and St Bride's High School in the town. In February 2011, Colgan collapsed with a heart attack at Cathkin Braes Golf Club and was pronounced dead on arrival at Southern General Hospital in Glasgow.
