= William Pilsworth =

Irish Anglican bishop

William Pilsworth was Church of Ireland Bishop of Kildare between 1604 and 1635. Nominated to the see on 23 July 1604, he was consecrated on 11 September 1604 and served as bishop until his death on 9 May 1635. Prior to his consecration as bishop he was Prebendary of Monmohenock, a post he retained concurrently with the bishopric. He was also vicar of St David's Church, Naas.
