= Kildare Abbey =

Former monastery in County Kildare, Ireland

Coordinates: 53.158158°N 6.912026°W

Kildare Abbey is a former monastery in County Kildare, Ireland, founded by St Brigid in the 5th century, and destroyed in the 12th century.

Originally known as Druim Criaidh, or the Ridge of Clay, Kildare came to be known as Cill-Dara, or the Church of the Oak, from the stately oak-tree loved by St. Brigid. She founded a small oratory which soon expanded into a large double monastery, one portion being for women, the other for men. She procured St. Conleth to rule and ordain the monastery, and another bishop, St. Nadfraoich, to preach and teach the Gospel.

Cogitosus, a monk of Kildare in the eighth century, and the author of what is known as the Second Life of St. Brigid, calls Kildare "the head-city of all the bishops", and Conleth and his successors "arch-bishops of the bishops of Ireland", and goes on to refer to the primacy of honour and domestic jurisdiction acknowledged in the abbess of this city by all the abbesses of Ireland. To this primacy, maintained all along, is due the unique distinction enjoyed by Kildare of having recorded by the annalists, till comparatively recent times, the succession of its abbesses in parallel columns with that of its abbots. Cogitosus also makes mention of the enormous crowds that, in his time, used to come to Kildare from "all the provinces of Erin", especially on St. Brigid's feast-day, 1 February, to pray and to have cures effected at her venerated shrine. He describes the church as very spacious and beautiful, with divisions between men and women, lavishly adorned with pictures and embroidered hangings, and with highly ornamental windows and doorways.

No portion of this church now remains, nor indeed of any of the ancient buildings, with the exception of the Round Tower. This tower - 136 feet 7 inches high - has an elaborately worked doorway. Bishop Conlaeth founded at Kildare a school in metalwork which grew and prospered as the years went on. Gerald of Wales praises the standard of illumination of manuscripts there, and in particular the Evangelistarium, or manuscript of the Four Gospels, according to the version of St. Jerome. The Book of Leinster is thought to have been copied from originals preserved in the School of Kildare, by Finn MacGorman, who became Bishop of Kildare in 1148.

Professors of this school include Cobthac, who died in 1069, and was celebrated for "his universal knowledge of ecclesiastical discipline"; and Ferdomhnach the Blind, who was deeply versed in knowledge of the Sacred Scriptures. In 1135 Dermot MacMurrough disrupted the monastery; and in the following year Diarmaid O'Brien and his brothers sacked and set fire to the town. But the School of Brigid continued. The holy fire called the "inextinguishable", which had probably been kept alight since the days of Brigid, was put out by order of Henry de Loundres, Archbishop of Dublin, who thought the practice savoured of superstition. The fire was kindled again by the Bishop of Kildare, and it burned until the crackdown in the reign of Elizabeth I extinguished it and every other monastic light in Ireland.

== See also ==
- List of abbots and abbesses of Kildare
- List of abbeys and priories in Ireland (County Kildare)
