= Michael Colgan (nutritionist) =

Sports nutritionist

- Born: c. 1938 (age 87–88); United Kingdom

Academic work
- Discipline: Nutrition
- Institutions: New Zealand Ministry of Works; University of Auckland; Colgan Institute
- Main interests: Athletic performance, aging, vitamins
- Website: drmichaelcolgan.com

Michael Colgan (born c. 1938) is an American research scientist. In 1983, he started the Colgan Institute, which is a consulting, educational, and research facility primarily concerned with the effects of nutrition and exercise on athletic performance, aging, and the prevention of degenerative disease. Colgan has served as a consultant to a number of international companies and government agencies.

== Biography ==
Colgan was born and raised in the United Kingdom. Prior to becoming a nutritionist, he was a structural engineer in New Zealand and worked for the New Zealand Ministry of Works. His PhD from University of Auckland is in physiological psychology and his dissertation looked at the heart's control mechanism. He currently is on the Scientific Advisory Board for the network marketing product Isagenix International. Colgan is a member of the American Academy of Anti-Aging Medicine, the American College of Sports Medicine, the British Society for Nutritional Medicine, and the International and American Associations of Clinical Nutritionists. He is also a Fellow of the American College of Nutrition.

Colgan's books cover several areas including nutrition for strength and muscular development, nutritional strategies and methods to slow the aging process, and nutritional methods to prevent disease.

== Bibliography ==
- Your Personal Vitamin profile No longer in print (1982)
- Prevent Cancer Now: Your Guide to Self Protection (1992)
- Optimum Sports Nutrition: Your Competitive Edge No longer in print(1993)
- The New Nutrition: Medicine for the Millennium No longer in print (1996)
- Hormonal Health: Nutritional and Hormonal Strategies for Emotional Well-Being & Intellectual Longevity (1996)
- The Flavonoid Revolution: Grape Seed Extract and Other Flavonoids Against Disease (1997)
- Creatine for Muscle and Strength No longer in print (1997)
- Win the War Against Arthritis No longer in print (1999)
- The Right Protein for Muscle and Strength No longer in print (1999)
- Essential Fats No longer in print (1999)
- Antioxidants, the Real Story (1999)
- Beat Arthritis (1999)
- Protect Your Prostate (2000)
- Sports Nutrition Guide: Minerals, Vitamins & Antioxidants for Athletes No longer in print (2002)
- All New Sports Nutrition Guide No longer in print (2002)
- Perfect Posture: The Basis Of Power (2002)
- New Power Program: New Protocols for Maximum Strength (2004)
- Nutrition For Champions (2007)
- Save Your Brain (2008)
- Strong Bones (2009)
- The Perimenopause Solution (2009)
- Save Your Brain: Expand Your Mind (2012)
- Quiet Mind: Journey of Joy (2013)
