= Gregory Colgan =

Australian cricketer (born 1953)

Personal information
- Born: 5 November 1953 (age 73); Perth, Western Australia
- Source: Cricinfo, 6 November 2017

Gregory Colgan (born 5 November 1953) is an Australian cricketer. He played his only first-class match for Western Australia in 1977/78.
