= Kildare Cathedral =

Church of Ireland cathedral in Kildare town

- Cathedral Church of St Brigid, Kildare
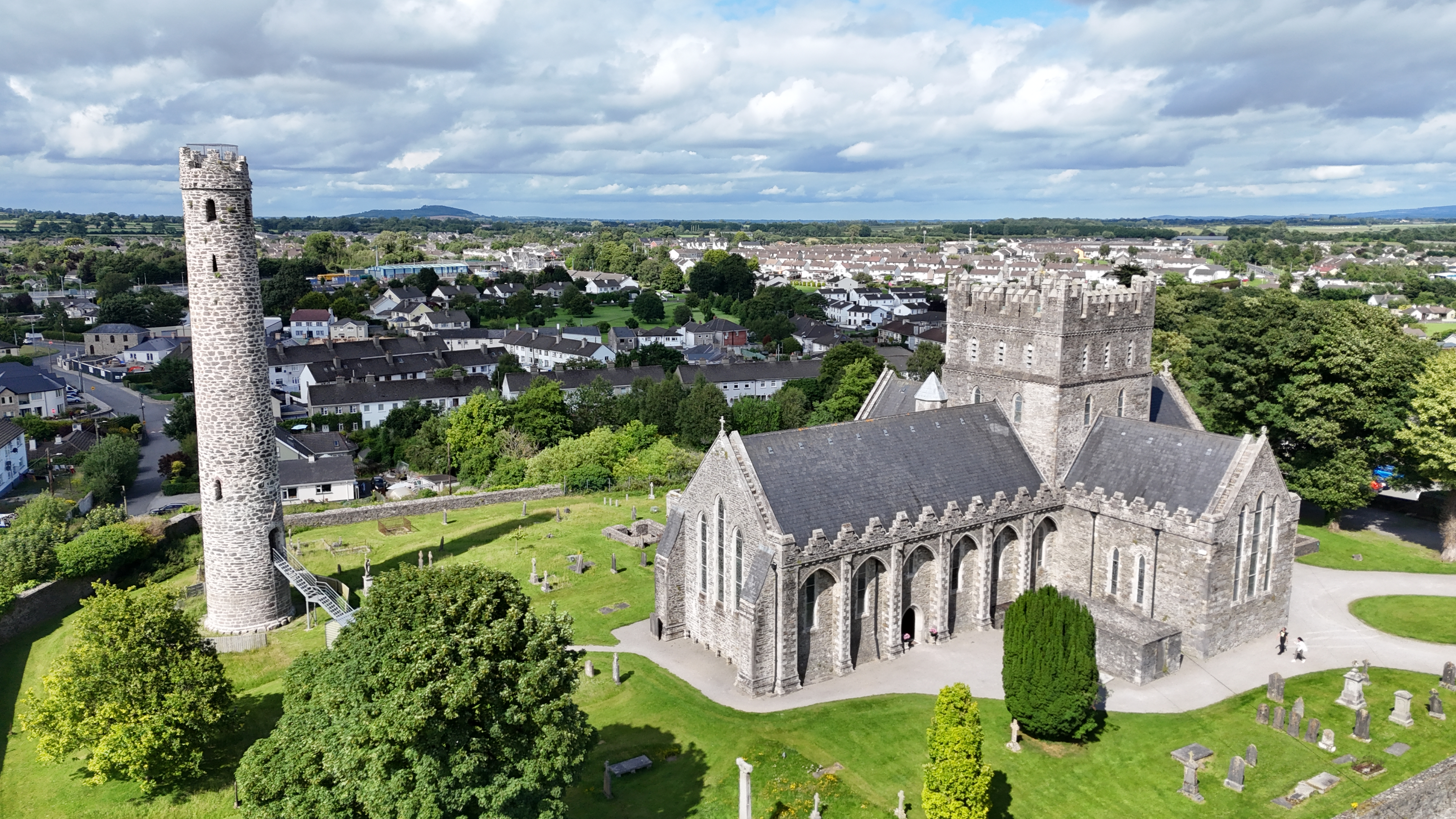

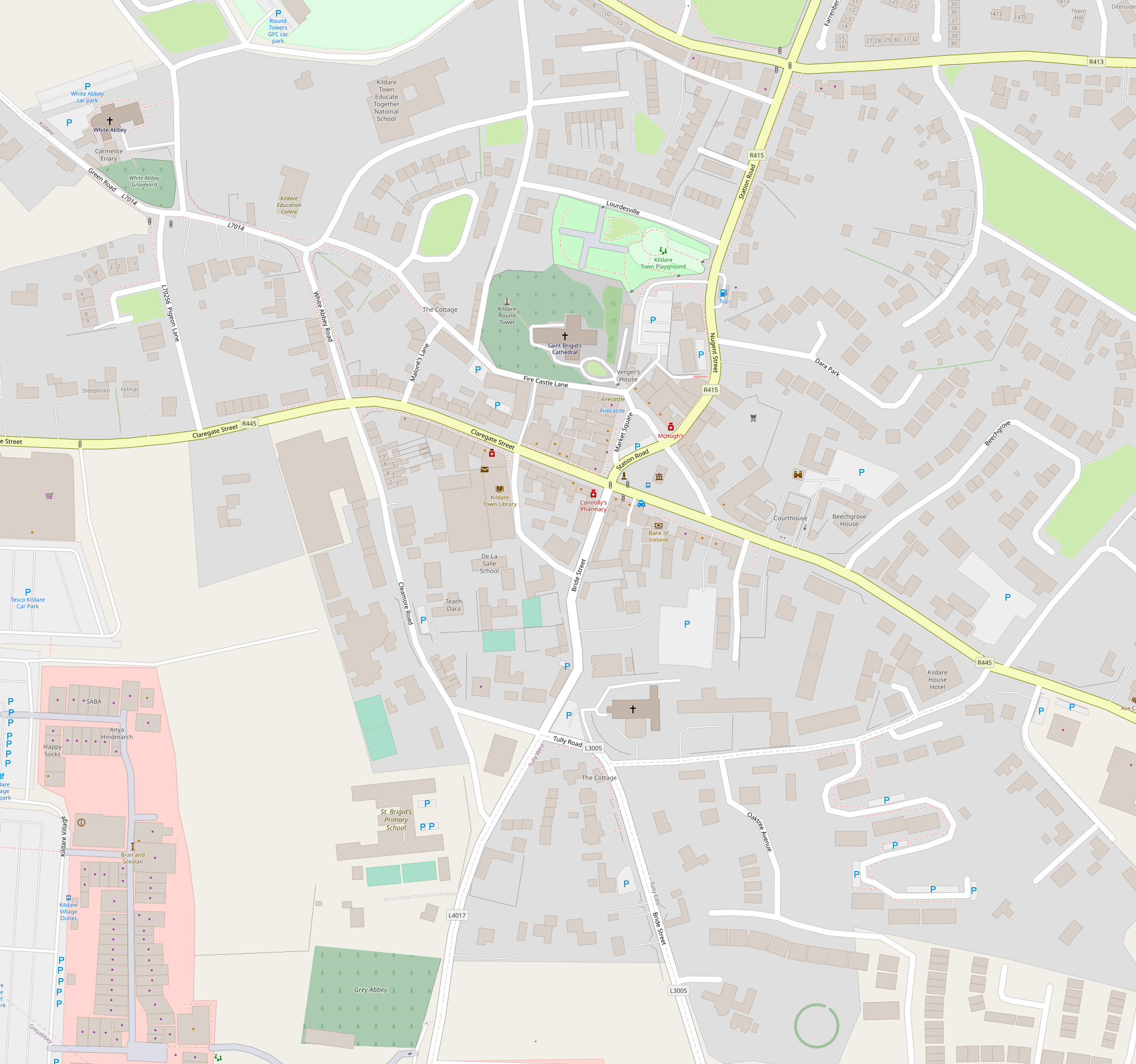
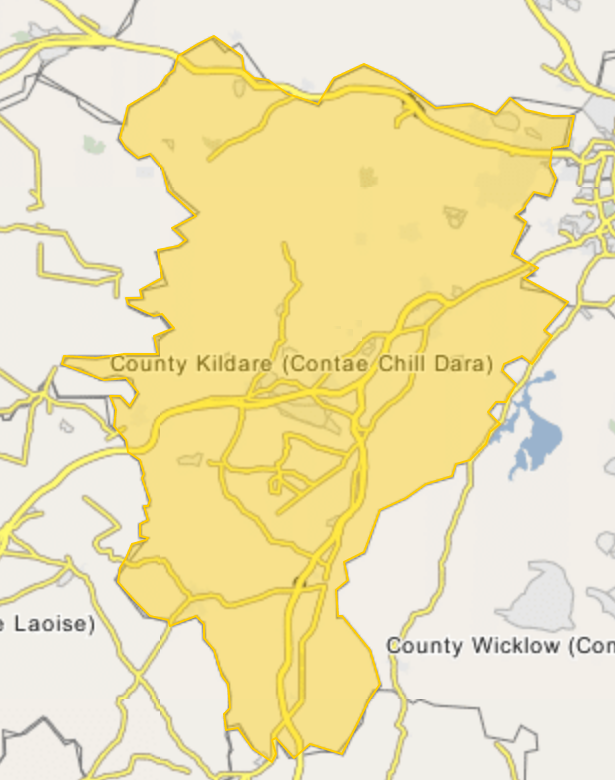
- Location within Kildare Location within County Kildare Location within Ireland
- 53.1579°N 6.9114°W
- Location: Kildare, County Kildare
- Country: Ireland
- Denomination: Church of Ireland
- Previous denomination: Roman Catholic
- Website: https://stbrigidscathedral.com/

History
- Founded: After 1223
- Founder: Probably Ralph of Bristol
- Dedication: St. Brigid
- Dedicated: This abbey site dates from AD 480
- Consecrated: 1230
- Events: St. Brigid's firehouse or fire-temple of Kildare was maintained from pre-christian period until 16th century

Architecture
- Functional status: Active
- Heritage designation: National Monument
- Architect: George Edmund Street (1824–1881) was responsible for the reconstruction completed by 1896
- Architectural type: Cruciform without aisles
- Style: Irish Gothic
- Groundbreaking: A feature is the arches spanning from buttress to buttress in advance of the side walls
- Completed: Renovation completed 1896

Specifications
- Capacity: Can accommodate the 20 Church of Ireland families who maintain the cathedral
- Materials: Various stones including granite and sandstone

Administration
- Province: Province of Dublin
- Diocese: Diocese of Meath and Kildare

Clergy
- Bishop: The Most Reverend Pat Storey
- Dean: The Very Reverend Isobel Jackson

Kildare Cathedral, or St Brigid's Cathedral in Kildare, is one of two Church of Ireland cathedrals in the United Dioceses of Meath and Kildare. It is in the ecclesiastical province of Dublin. Originally, as part of the wider Western Church, all in communion with the See of Rome, it was built in the 13th century on the site of an important Celtic Christian abbey, which is said to have been founded by Saint Brigid in the 5th century. The site has been in the care of the Church of Ireland since its separation from Rome at the time of the Reformation and after falling into decay was restored in the 19th century. There is an Irish round tower in the cathedral grounds.

== History ==
=== Early history ===
It is said that in the year 480 (35 years after Saint Patrick settled in Armagh) Saint Brigid arrived in Kildare with her nuns. Her original abbey church may have been a simple wooden building. Soon after her death in 523 A.D., a costly shrine was erected in her honour in a new and larger building. For many centuries Kildare maintained a unique Irish experiment; the Abbess ruled over a double community of women and men, and the Bishop was subordinate in jurisdiction to the abbess.

Between the years 835 and 998 the cathedral was devastated approximately 16 times, so that when the Norman, Ralph of Bristol, became bishop in 1223 it was virtually in ruins. Between then and 1230 it was largely rebuilt, likely in the years following 1223, and probably by Ralph of Bristol who was made Bishop of the see in 1222 and died in 1232.

Still semi-ruinous by 1500, it was derelict by 1649. In 1686 it was partially rebuilt.

=== Demise and resurrection ===
Kildare Cathedral in ruins, 1871

The cathedral fell into disrepair following the 16th century English Reformation, and was ruined during the 17th century Irish Confederate Wars.

A near complete restoration of the building was undertaken during the 19th century by George Edmund Street. He started restoration work on the cathedral in 1875, and work continued after his death in 1881 until it was complete in 1896. These works included a new north transept, new chancel, and new west wall as well as rebuilding three sides of the square tower. A new oak roof (which is supported on stone corbels) was built into the wall buttresses.

As part of the cathedral's centenary, the building underwent further restoration including new internal porches, repairs to internal and external stonework and rebuilding of the organ.

== Current status and layout ==
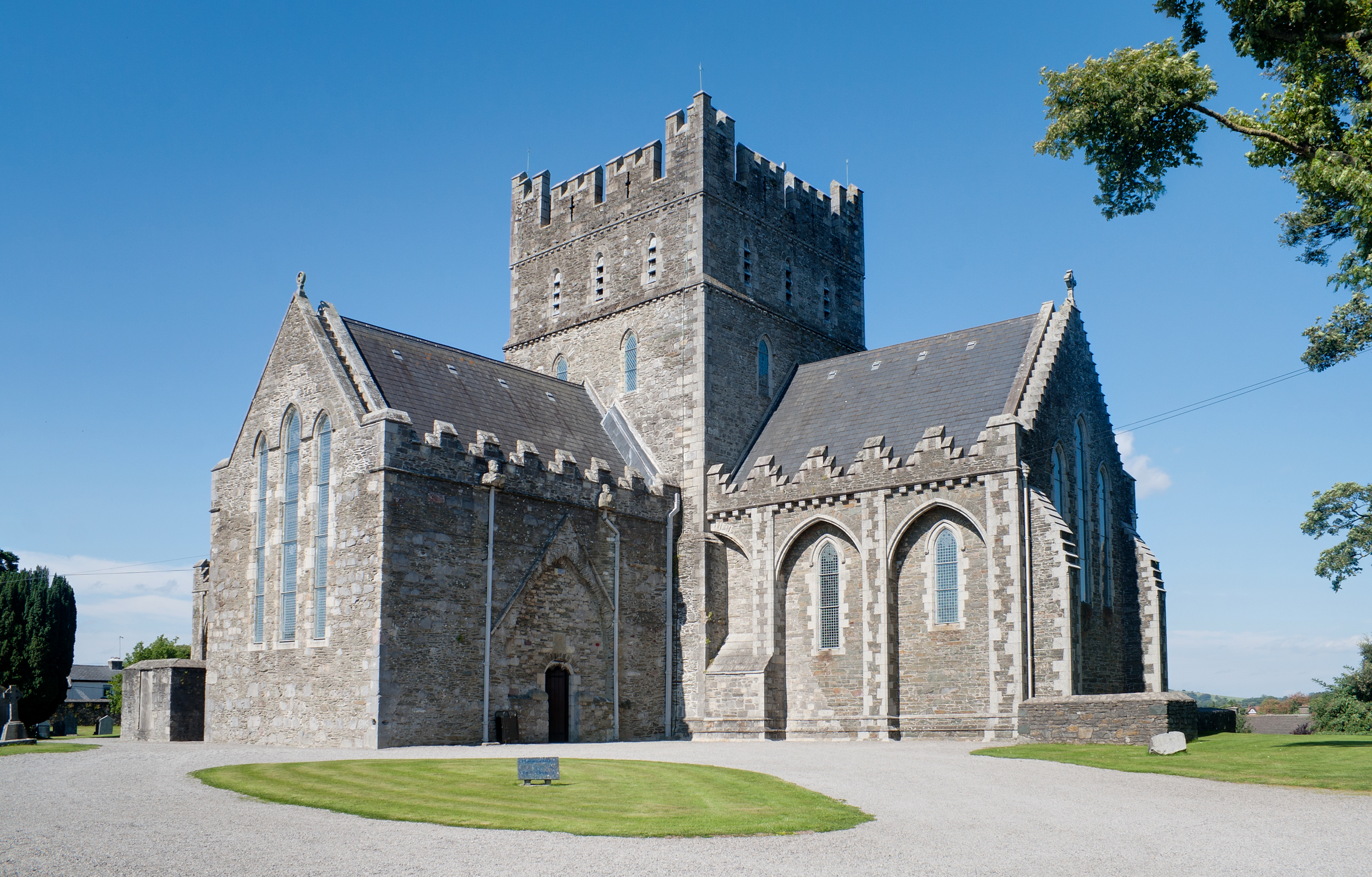
Building exterior

Previously the cathedral of the Diocese of Kildare, it is now one of two cathedrals in the United Dioceses of Meath and Kildare.

The present building is a restored Norman cathedral dating from 1223. The site occupied by the cathedral is likely the site of a pagan shrine to the goddess Brigid and the later of the church of Saint Brigid. A perpetual flame was kept here from pre-Christian times possibly until the time of Henry VIII, who destroyed many monasteries. Beside the cathedral stands one of County Kildare's five round towers which is 32 metres (105 ft) high, and which can be climbed at certain times.

The cathedral is cruciform in plan without aisles in the early gothic style with a massive square central tower. All the windows are lancet windows, singles or doubles, but triple lancets in the four gables. Design features include arches which span between buttress to buttress in advance of the side walls. The parapets are of the stepped Irish type (now much restored) but probably datable to c. 1395, the year in which a Papal relaxation was given to those who visited Kildare and gave alms for the conservation of the church. The interior treatment is plain, the window splays are not moulded, but the rear-arches, which are, spring from shafts with moulded capitals. These shafts are short and terminate in small curved tails.

== Features ==
Features of the cathedral include:

- An altar-tomb effigy of Bishop Walter Wellesley (died 1539) which is an example of 16th century sculpture
- A Sheelagh-na-gig (nude carving), which is unusual to find in cathedrals
- Solid oak stalls for the choir and chapter with acorn and oak leaf carvings.
- The Bishops throne.
- A high-altar area with reproductions of the medieval originals.
- Carved Caen Stone pulpit with carvings of the four evangelists and Irish marble columns.
- The Lady Chapel.
- The organ which was built by Conacher in 1898
- St. Luke stained glass window by Gerda Schurmann (from Czech Republic) dated 1974.
- A stone baptismal font which is not original to the cathedral but is dated from Medieval period.
- The west window, dedicated to St. Patrick, St. Brigid and St. Columba.

== Gallery ==
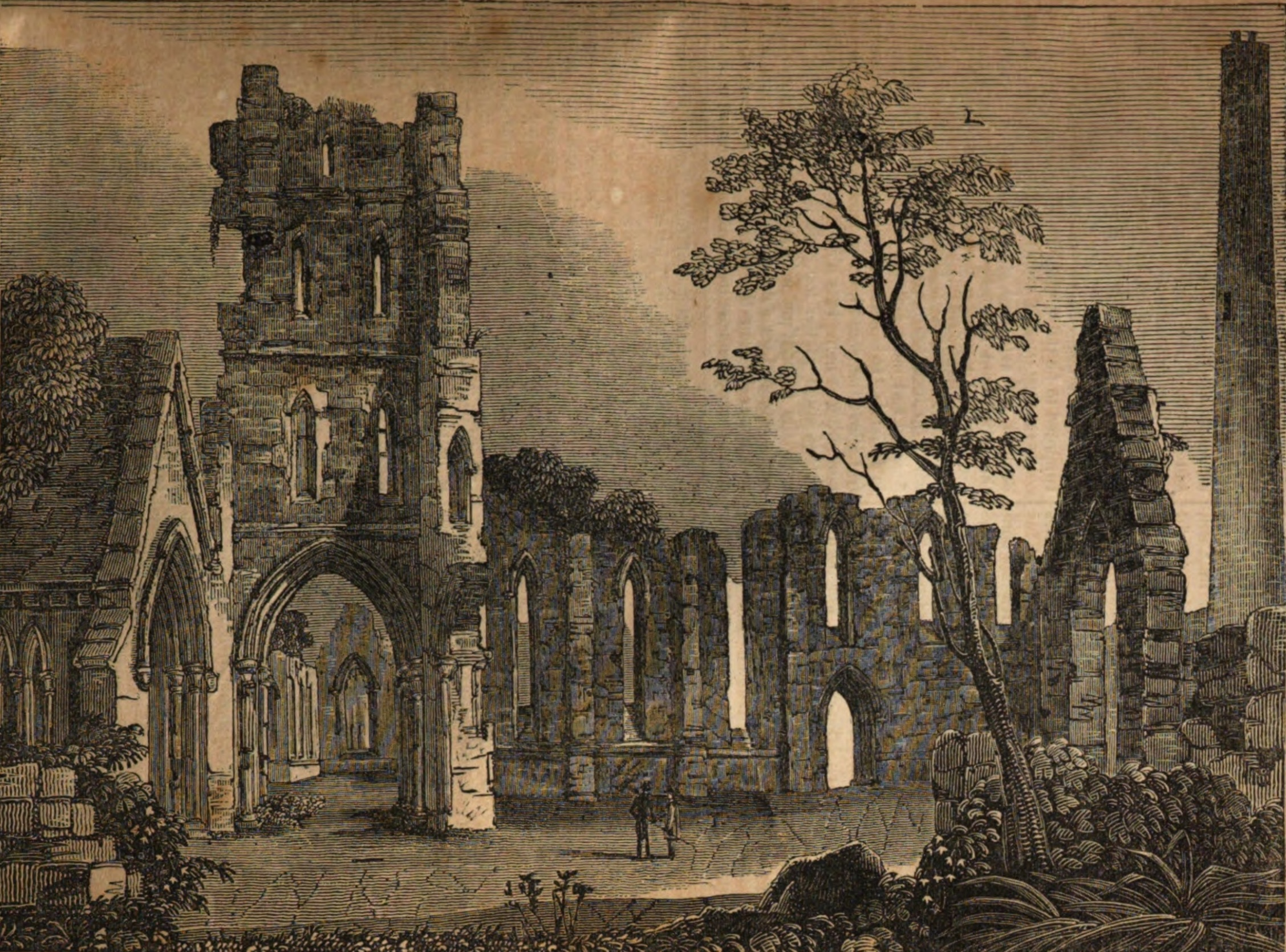
1835 woodcut of the cathedral ruins, before the church's restoration

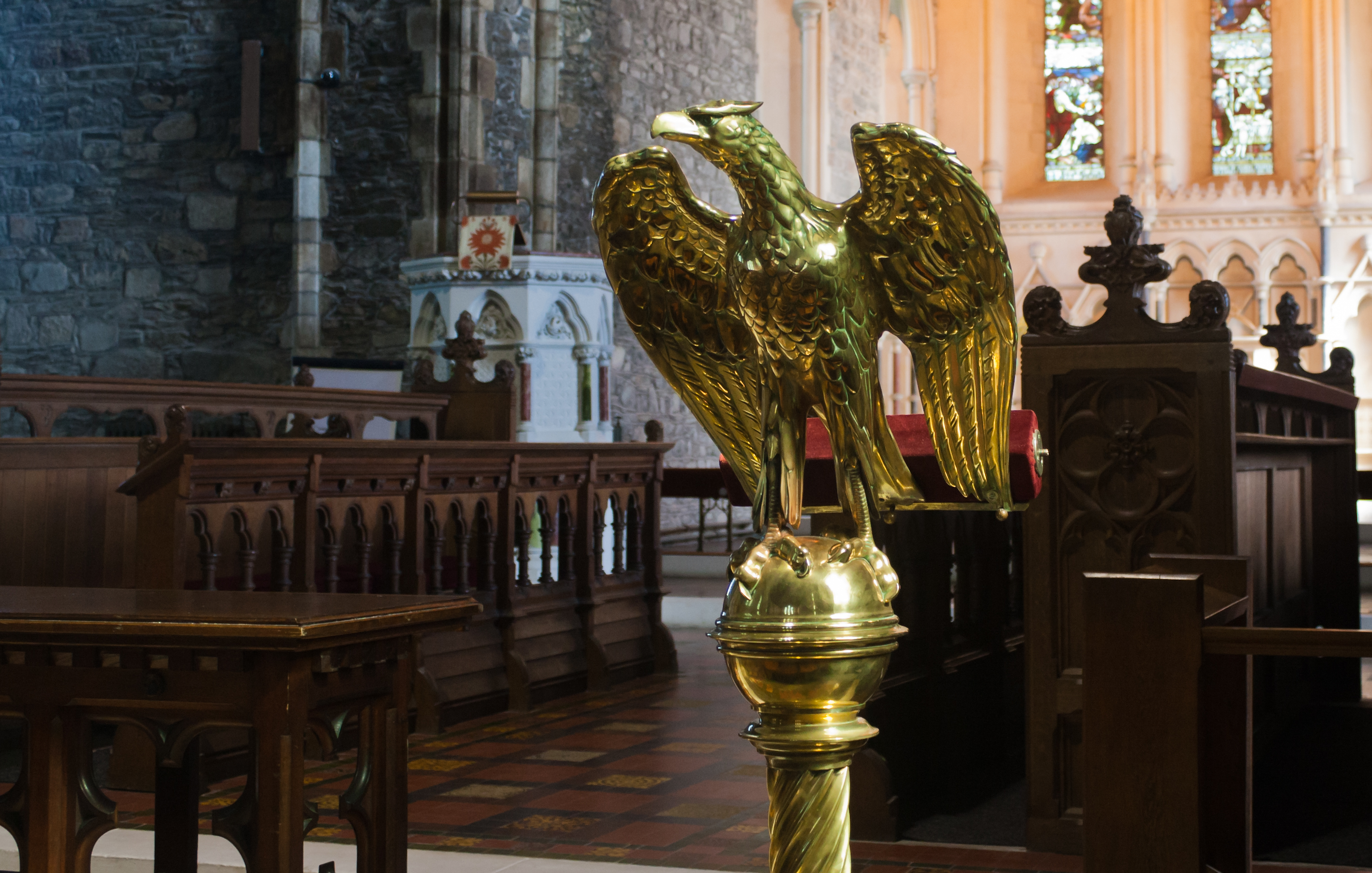
Eagle Lectern

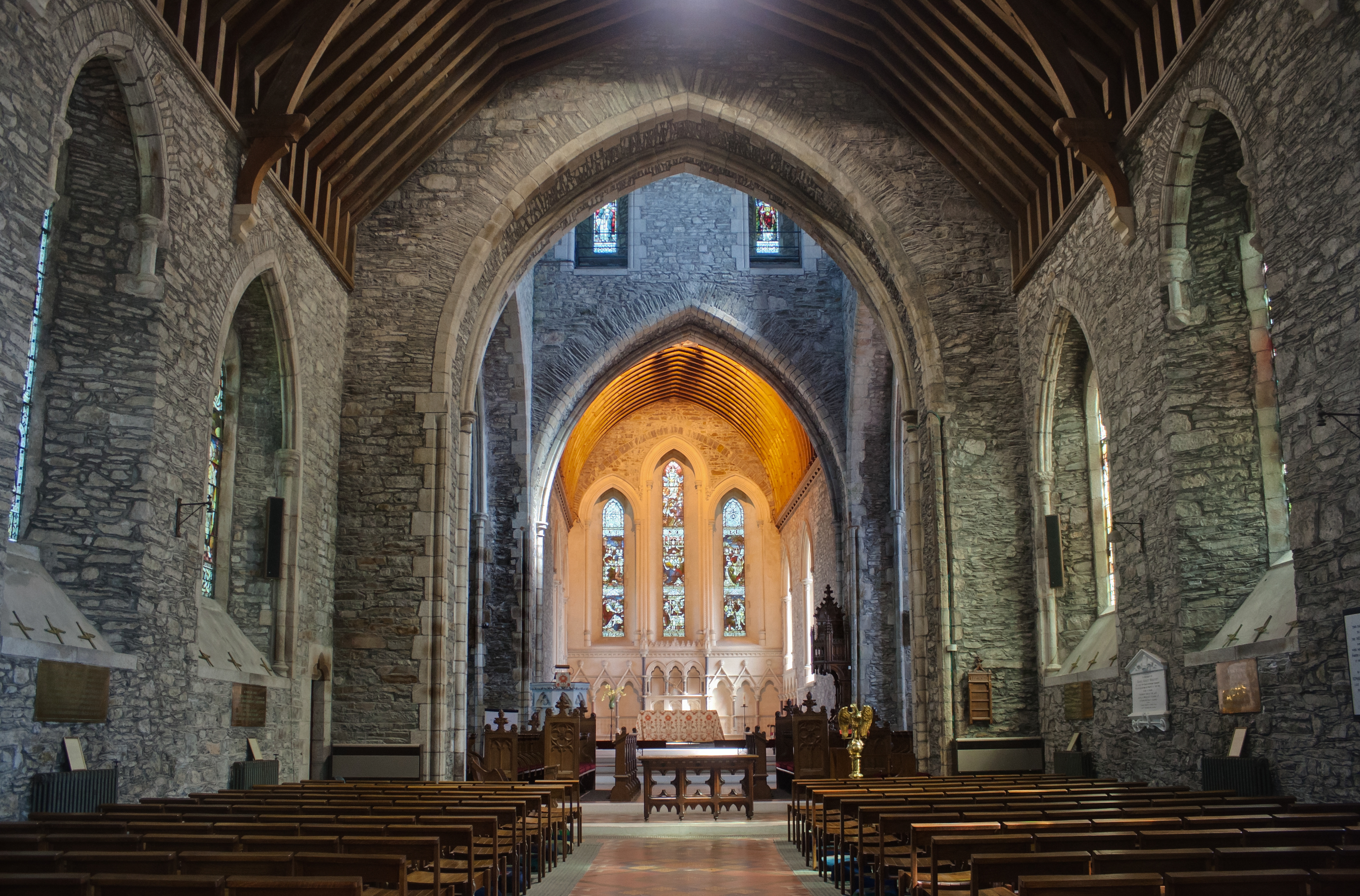
Nave

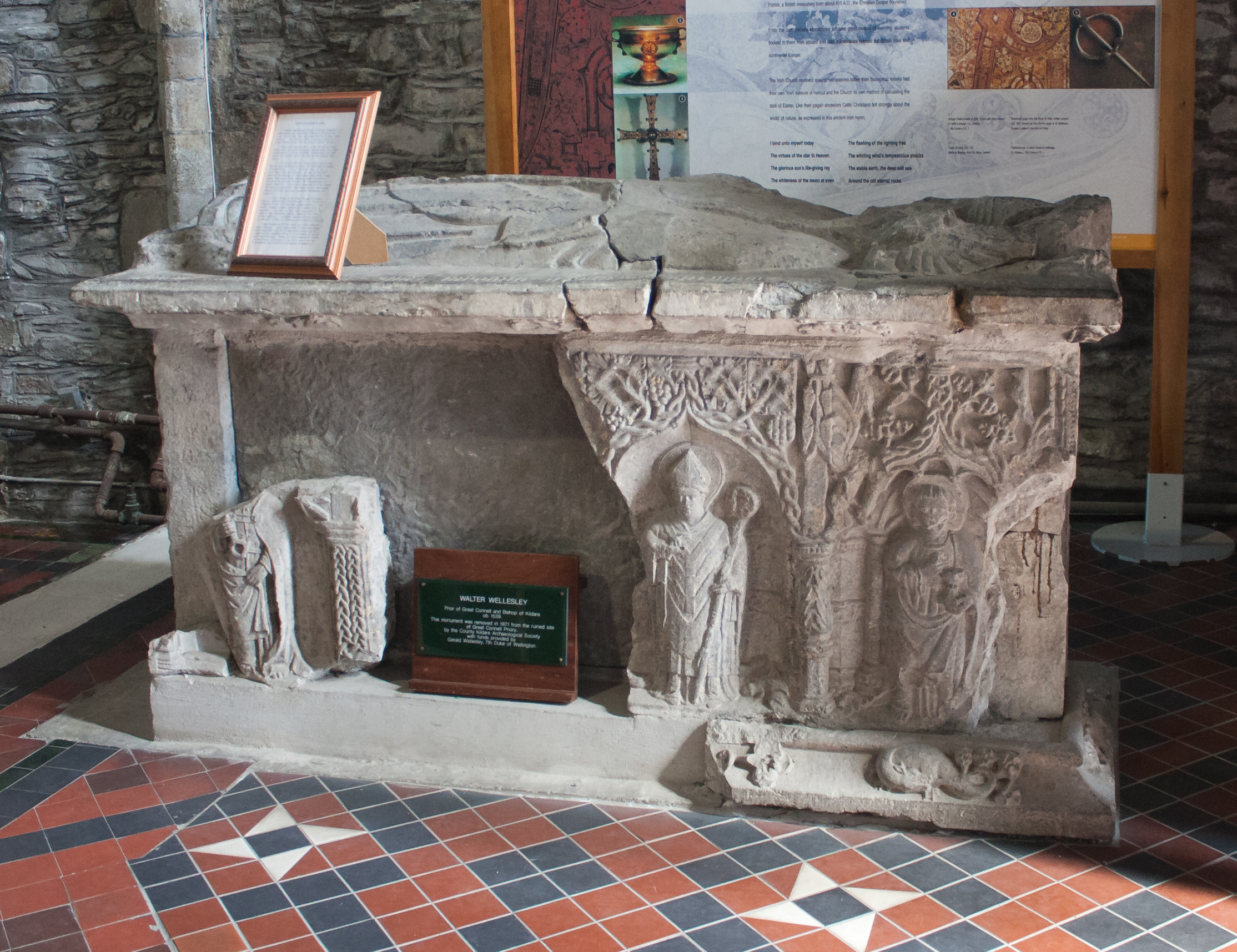
Tomb of Walter Wellesley

== See also ==
- Dean of Kildare
