= Arthur Preston =

Arthur Preston may refer to:

- Arthur Edwin Preston (1852–1942), mayor of Abingdon-on-Thames, antiquarian and historian
- Arthur Preston (bishop) (1883–1936), third Bishop of Woolwich
- Arthur Murray Preston (1913–1968), United States Navy officer and Medal of Honor recipient in World War II
- Arthur Preston (priest) (1761–1844), Anglican priest in Ireland
