= Moigne =

Moigne, Le Moigne, Lemoigne or Le Moing may refer to:

Moigne derives from mogn which means armless in Breton or from the Old French moignier which means to mutilate.

== People ==
- Jacqueline Le Moigne, French-educated NASA scientist
- Jean-Louis Le Moigne (1931–2022), French writer and epistemologist
- Jérôme Le Moigne (born 1983), French former footballer
- Thomas Moigne, 16th century English politician
- Thomas Moigne (bishop), Anglican bishop in Ireland

== Places ==
- Shipton Moyne, village and civil parish in Gloucestershire, England
