= Thomas Moigne (bishop) =

Irish Anglican bishop

The Rt. Rev. Thomas Moigne was an Anglican bishop in Ireland.

Moigne was born in Cadeby, Lincolnshire and educated at Peterhouse, Cambridge. He was ordained in 1588; and held the living at Cherry Hinton until his appointment as Archdeacon of Armagh in 1606. From 1608 until 1625 he was Dean of St Patrick's Cathedral, Dublin; and from 1613 until his death on 1 January 1629, Bishop of Kilmore and Ardagh.

Religious titles
Preceded by Eugene Woods	Archdeacon of Meath; 1606–1608	Succeeded by John Rider
Preceded by John Rider	Dean of St Patrick's Cathedral, Dublin; 1608–1625	Succeeded by Benjamin Culme
Preceded by Robert Draper	Bishop of Kilmore and Ardagh; 1813–1829	Succeeded by William Bedell
