= Robert Sutton (priest, died 1528) =

Irish priest

Robert Sutton (died 1 April 1528) was an Irish priest in the late Fifteenth century and the early decades of the Sixteenth century: he was Archdeacon of Dublin from 1498 to 1508; and then Dean of St. Patrick's Cathedral, Dublin from 1527 to 1528.

He spent much of his career in England, and was most reluctant to return to Ireland, apparently due to his ill health and his fear of bubonic plague and sweating sickness, both of which were prevalent in Dublin in the 1520s (in fairness to Sutton it must be said that his predecessor as Dean, John Rycardes, had also left Ireland for fear of the plague). It was said that he never set foot in the cathedral during his term of office (admittedly brief) as Dean. He died in April 1528, bequeathing all his property to his nephew William, son of his brother Lawrence.

A brass monument in the Cathedral commemorates both Sutton and his successor Geoffrey Fyche, Dean from 1529 to 1537.
