= Gabriel Maturin =

Irish Anglican Dean

Gabriel Maturin, D.D. was an Irish Anglican Dean.

Educated at Trinity College, Dublin, he was Dean of Kildare from 1737 to 1745 and Dean of St Patrick's Cathedral, Dublin, from 1745 until his death on 9 November 1746.

Religious titles
Preceded by Jonathan Swift	Dean of St Patrick's Cathedral, Dublin; 1745– 1746	Succeeded by Francis Corbet
