= Thomas Fich =

Irish ecclesiastic and compiler

Thomas Fich, Fych or Fyche (died 1517), was an Irish ecclesiastic and compiler.

He studied at the University of Oxford, became a canon regular, and was appointed sub-prior of the convent of the Holy Trinity at Dublin, now Christ Church Cathedral, Dublin. Of that establishment Fich compiled a meagre necrology in Latin, styled ‘Mortilogium’ or ‘Obitarium.’ He was also the compiler or transcriber of a collection of memoranda, chiefly on ecclesiastical matters, known as the ‘White Book of Christ Church, Dublin,’ still preserved in that cathedral.

The necrology was printed in Dublin by the Irish Archæological Society in 1844, with an introduction by James H. Todd, D.D. A reproduction of a page of the ‘White Book of Christ Church’ was given on plate i. of part iii. of Facsimiles of National MSS. of Ireland, published in 1879. Fich died in Dublin in 1517, and was interred in Christ Church there, to which he had been a considerable benefactor. He would appear to have been related to Geoffrey Fyche, Dean of St Patrick's Cathedral, Dublin, 1529–37 (he may have been Geoffrey's elder brother). In that cathedral is still extant a brass plate bearing the effigy of Geoffrey Fyche and a monumental inscription.
