= Nicholas Hill (priest) =

Irish Anglican priest (fl. 1428–1457)

Nicholas Hill (priest) was Dean of St Patrick's Cathedral, Dublin from 1428 until 1457, having previously been Archdeacon of Dublin, and vicar of Balrothery, County Dublin.

In 1442 he was summoned before the Privy Council of Ireland, to testify as to allegations of serious misconduct against Richard Talbot, Archbishop of Dublin.

Church of Ireland titles
Preceded by John Prene	Dean of St Patrick’s Cathedral, Dublin; 1428–1457	Succeeded by Philip Norris
