= Sir John Morton, 2nd Baronet =

English landowner and politician

Arms of Sir John Morton, 2nd Baronet: Morton impaling Culme, St Andrew's Church, Milborne St Andrew, Dorset

Sir John Morton, 2nd Baronet (c. 1627–1699) of Milbourne St Andrew in Dorset, was an English landowner and politician who sat in the House of Commons between 1661 and 1695.

== Origins ==
He was the eldest surviving son of Sir George Morton, 1st Baronet (d.1662) of Milbourne St Andrew, by his second wife Anne Wortley, a daughter of Sir Richard Wortley of Wortley, Yorkshire, and widow of Sir Rotherham Willoughby. On the Restoration in 1660 he became Gentleman of the Privy Chamber.

== Career ==
In 1661, he was elected a Member of Parliament for Poole, Dorset, in the Cavalier Parliament and sat until 1679. He succeeded to the baronetcy on the death of his father in 1662. He was elected an MP for Weymouth and Melcombe Regis, Dorset, on 22 August 1679 and sat until 1695.

== Marriages ==
He married twice:

- Firstly, before 1664, to Eleanor Fountain (d.1671), a daughter of John Fountain, Serjeant at Law), buried at Milborne;
- Secondly, by licence issued on 24 February 1676, he married Elizabeth Culme, a daughter of the Rev. Benjamin Culme, Doctor of Divinity, Dean of St. Patrick's Cathedral, Dublin, by his wife Deborah Pleydell (1623-1695) a daughter of Sir Charles (or Oliver) Pleydell (son of Gabriel Pleydell (d. circa 1591), MP, of Midg Hall in the parish of Lydiard St John (later Lydiard Tregoze) in Wiltshire) by his second wife Jane St. John, a daughter of Sir John St. John, four-times a Member of Parliament for Bedfordshire, of Lydiard St John's (now Lydiard Tregoze), Wiltshire. By Elizabeth Culme he had one daughter:
  - Anne Morton, who married Edmund Pleydell of Midge Hall.

== Death and burial ==
Morton died without a male heir in 1699, aged 71, and the baronetcy thus became extinct. He was buried at Milborne St Andrew, Dorset.

Parliament of England
Preceded by Sir Walter Erle; George Cooper	Member of Parliament for Poole; 1661–1679; With: Sir John Fitzjames 1661–1670; Thomas Trenchard 1670; George Cooper 1673; Thomas Strangways 1673–1679	Succeeded by Henry Trenchard; Thomas Chafin
Preceded by Thomas Browne; Lord Ashley; Michael Harvey; Sir John Coventry	Member of Parliament for Weymouth and Melcombe Regis; 1679–1695; With: Thomas Browne 1679–1680; Michael Harvey 1679–1685; Sir John Coventry 1679–1685; Henry Henning 1680–1695; Francis Mohun 1685–1689; George Strangways 1685–1689; Michael Harvey 1689–1695; Nicholas Gould 1690–1691; Thomas Freke 1691–1695	Succeeded by Maurice Ashley; John Knight; Michael Harvey; Thomas Freke
Baronetage of England
Preceded by George Morton	Baronet (of Milbourne St Andrew); 1662–1699	Extinct
