= Thomas de Everdon =

English-born Irish cleric and judge

Thomas de Everdon (c. 1320–1413) was an English-born cleric and judge, who was a trusted Crown official in Ireland for several decades.

In a career which spanned almost fifty years, he served as Dean of St. Patrick's Cathedral, Master of the Rolls in Ireland and Deputy to the Lord Chancellor of Ireland. In addition, he was an exceptionally hard-working civil servant who was entrusted with a wide variety of civil, military and administrative tasks: in 1386 the King referred to Everdon's "labours on royal business throughout Ireland", and in the following year he was described as the King's "commissioner". There are so many references to him over a period of almost half a century that some historians have questioned whether all of them can be to the same man.

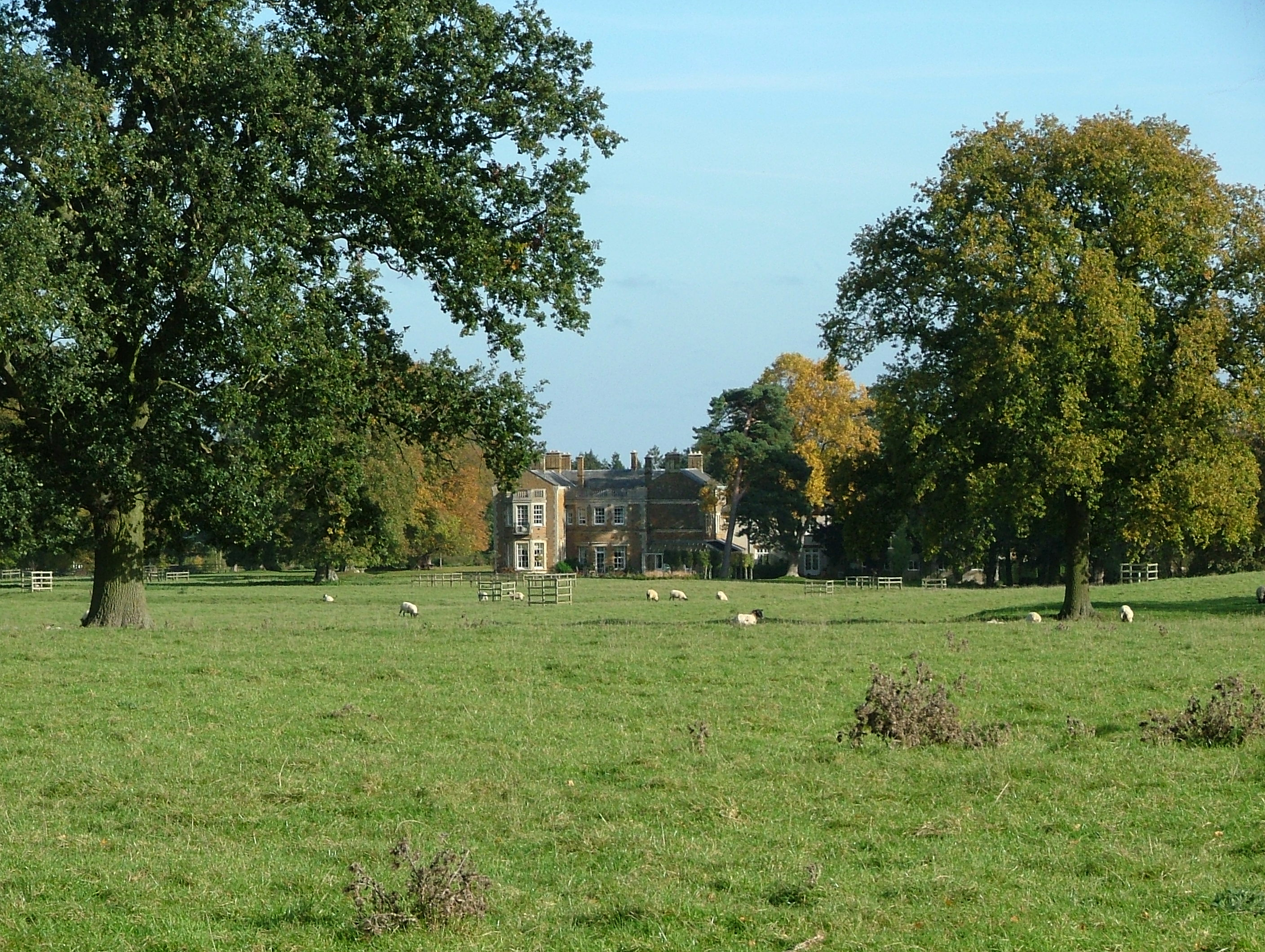
Everdon, Northamptonshire, Thomas's probable birthplace

His surname suggests that he came from Everdon in Northamptonshire. Whether or not he had any connection with the French Benedictine house of Everdon Priory nearby is unclear. He is thought to have been the Thomas de Everdon who first appears in the official Irish records in 1343, when he was presented with the living of Ardkeen, County Down in 1345, although he must then have been a very young man with almost seventy years of life ahead of him.

He was a Canon of St. Patrick's Cathedral, Dublin, in 1374, in which capacity he presented a petition to the Crown on behalf of the Dean and Chapter in 1375 for the required royal licence to elect a new Archbishop of Dublin in place of Thomas Minot, deceased. He became Dean himself in 1396. His tenure saw a dispute between the Pope and the Crown as to who had the right to appoint the Dean; eventually, it was agreed that the Cathedral chapter would choose the Dean. Thomas resigned from the Deanery in 1401 and became prebendary of Clonmethan, County Dublin. He also held the living of St. Mary's, Kildalkey, County Meath, from which he resigned in 1411. He also held lands at Siddan in County Meath. In 1382 following the death of Edmund Mortimer, 3rd Earl of March, Thomas jointly with Walter de Brugge, one of the Barons of the Court of Exchequer (Ireland), received custody of his lands at Moylagh, County Meath, during the minority of the heir.

He was Clerk of the Crown and Hanaper (Chief Clerk in Chancery) in 1373, jointly with Robert Sutton; an order in Council states that the annual fee of £20 should be divided between them. He was joint Master of the Rolls in 1374 with Robert Sutton and sole Master 1386–1395. He acted briefly as Chief Baron of the Irish Exchequer. He was Keeper of the Great Seal of Ireland in 1374 and acted regularly as Deputy to the Lord Chancellor of Ireland, particularly during the tenure of Thomas Cranley. Cranley was frequently unable to perform his duties as Chancellor through a combination of age, ill health and the pressure of business. In 1402 the Patent Rolls actually name Everdon as the newly appointed Lord Chancellor, but this seems to have been a temporary appointment, due to Cranley's "great infirmity". He was second Chamberlain of the Exchequer of Ireland in the 1380s, stepping down in 1391. Ball states that Everdon was spoken of as a possible Treasurer of Ireland in 1406, although he cannot have been much younger than Cranley. In 1386, and again in 1407 he was appointed Chief Engrosser (copier) of the Exchequer of Ireland "during good behaviour", with power to appoint a deputy during his absence. At the very end of his life he was pursuing John Philpot or Fulpot, a merchant of Drogheda, for a debt of 40 shillings before the Court of Common Pleas (Ireland).

In addition, he was employed by the Crown to carry out numerous administrative tasks: Mason states that they seem to have mainly involved the keeping of accounts for the Army, and the hiring of troops. He was appointed by King Richard II a Royal Commissioner with John Lambard to collect the King's debts in County Kilkenny, County Wexford and Munster. In 1386 the King authorised him to appoint attorneys to act for him in Meath and Louth, on the ground that he was so heavily employed on royal business throughout Ireland that he could not properly attend to his business in these two counties.

He died in 1413 when he must have been well over ninety. Mason wondered if there were in fact two officials of the same name: he doubted when one man could have performed so many varied duties nor whether, given the life expectancy at the time, he could have had a career lasting so many decades. On the other hand, Robert Sutton, another contemporary Master of the Rolls, had an equally long and varied career, and did not die until 1430.
