= George Cooper (Poole MP) =

English politician

- Born: 1626
- Died: 1689 (aged 62–63)

George Cooper (1626–1689) was an English politician who sat in the House of Commons at various times between 1654 and 1673. He fought in the Parliamentary army in the English Civil War.

== Life ==
Cooper was the second son of Sir John Cooper, 1st Baronet of Rockbourne, Hampshire and was baptised on 15 December 1626. Throughout his life he was overshadowed by his brother Anthony Ashley Cooper. He was a student at Exeter College, Oxford in 1642. He joined the parliamentary army and was a captain by 1644 and major by 1646. He was commissioner for militia for Tower Hamlets from 1648 to 1649 and a J.P. for Middlesex from 1648 to July 1660. By 1649 he was also J.P. for Dorset.. From 1649 to February 1660 he was trustee for maintenance of ministers. In 1650 he was a member of the high court of justice. He was commissioner for assessment for Middlesex in 1650 and 1652 and became J.P. for Wiltshire instead of Dorset in 1653.

In 1654, Cooper was elected member of parliament for Poole in the First Protectorate Parliament. Also in 1654, he was a member of the high court of justice and commissioner for scandalous ministers for Wiltshire. He was commissioner for oyer and terminer on the Western circuit in 1655. In 1657 he was commissioner for assessment for Wiltshire. He was commissioner for assessment for Middlesex and Wiltshire in January 1660, commissioner of Admiralty from February to July 1660 and commissioner for militia for Middlesex and Wiltshire in March 1660. In April 1660 he became freeman of Poole and was elected MP for Poole in the Convention Parliament. His main interest concerned the crown lands in Clarendon Park, which he had bought for £3,000 and hoped to retain with support from the Presbyterian peers. However his petition was unsuccessful and the park was granted to the George Monck, 1st Duke of Albemarle in 1665. He continued living nearby at Farley.

In 1666 Cooper obtained the post of treasurer of prizes at Dover 1666. He was commissioner of revenue arrears in 1671. In 1673 he was elected MP for Poole again, but the election was declared void because his brother, then Lord Chancellor, had issued the writ during the recess without parliament's authority. He was commissioner for assessment for Wiltshire from 1673 to 1680.

Cooper died at the age of about 62 in or before July 1689 when he was described as "recently deceased".

== Family ==
Cooper married Elizabeth Oldfield, daughter of John Oldfield, fishmonger and sugar refiner of London, in July 1647. They had two sons and six daughters.

Parliament of England
Preceded by Not represented in Barebones Parliament	Member of Parliament for Poole; 1654	Succeeded by Edward Boteler
Preceded by John Pyne	Member of Parliament for Poole; 1660; With: Sir Walter Erle	Succeeded by John Fitzjames; John Morton
Preceded by Sir John Morton, 2nd Baronet; Thomas Trenchard	Member of Parliament for Poole; 1673; With: Sir John Morton, 2nd Baronet	Succeeded by Sir John Morton, 2nd Baronet; Thomas Strangways
