= Robert Sutton (Irish judge) =

Irish judge and Crown official

Robert Sutton (c. 1340 – 1430) was an Irish judge and Crown official. During a career which lasted almost 60 years he served the English Crown in a variety of offices, notably as Deputy to the Lord Chancellor of Ireland, Chief Baron of the Irish Exchequer, Master of the Rolls in Ireland, and Deputy Treasurer of Ireland. A warrant dated 1423 praised him for his "long and laudable" service to the Crown.

== Early career ==
Little is known of his early life: the surname Sutton has been common in Ireland since the thirteenth century, especially in the south. William Sutton, who acted as his deputy from 1423 onwards and succeeded him as Master of the Rolls in 1430, is thought to have been his nephew. William was a clerk in Crown service by 1404, and became Chief Engrosser (copier) in the Court of Exchequer (Ireland) in 1410.

Robert was appointed to the living of St. Patrick's Church, Trim (now Trim Cathedral) in 1370; later he became Archdeacon of Kells and prebendary of St Patrick's Cathedral, Dublin, and later Prebendary of Ossory. In 1423, he was removed as Archdeacon of Kells, on the ground that he had "unlawfully detained" the office.

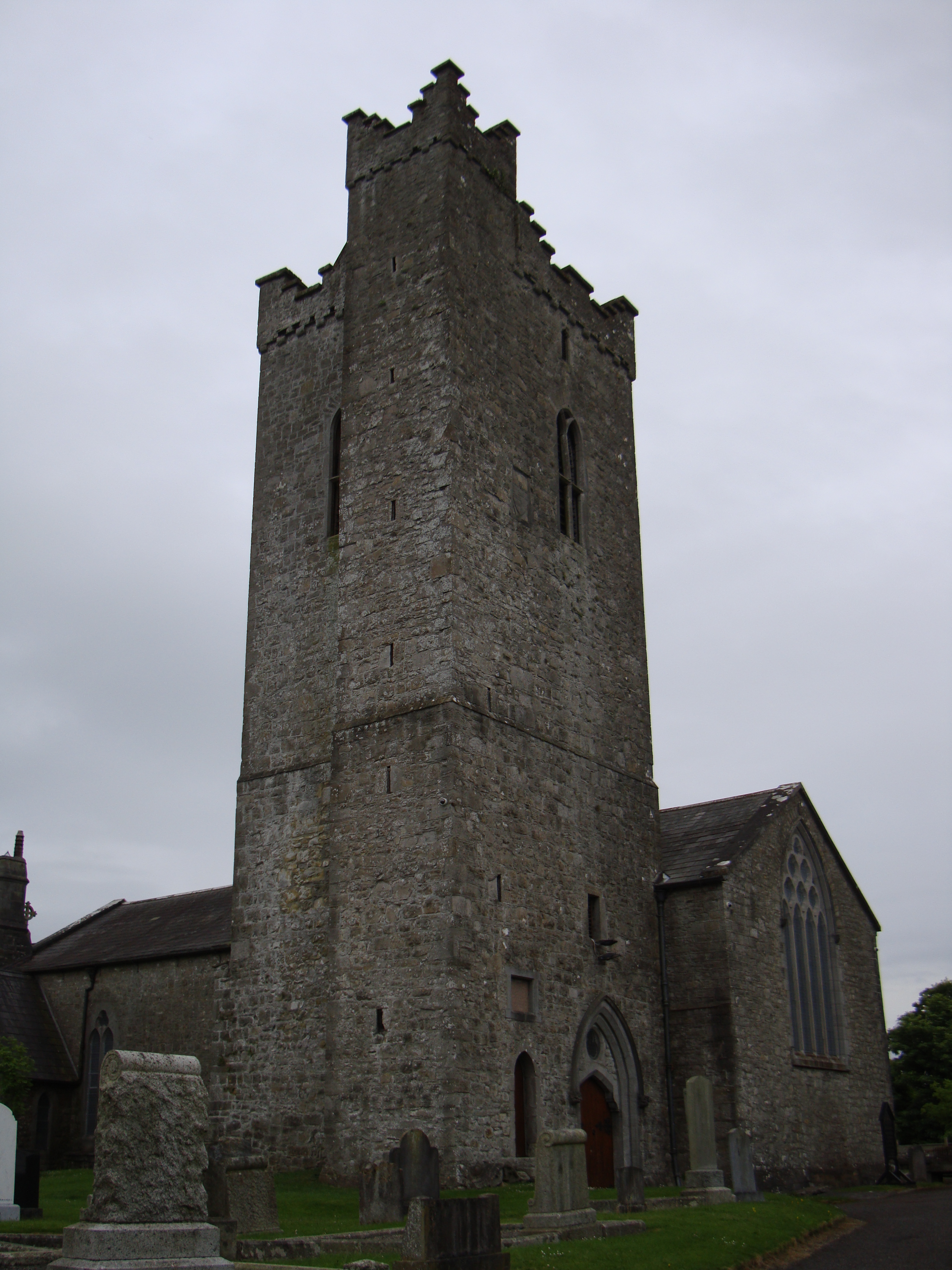
St Patrick's Church, Trim

== Judge ==
He was appointed Clerk of the Crown and Hanaper, or chief clerk in the Irish Chancery, about 1373, an office he held jointly with Thomas de Everdon. An order in Council stated that they should share the annual fee of £20. In 1408, the Crown granted him an extra allowance (the amount is no longer known) out of the hanaper in consideration of his "great labours" in the King's service. As a judge, he served in a variety of offices over many years. He was appointed Master of the Rolls in 1377 and held that office at regular intervals over the next fifty years, at times jointly with Thomas de Everdon: his final warrant of appointment was granted in 1423, and apparently confirmed him in office for life, with a reversion in favour of his nephew William, although Richard Ashwell had succeeded him as Master of the Rolls by 1427.

== Richard Ashwell ==
Ashwell is recorded as an attorney from 1409. He was a senior clerk in the Chancery from at least 1416, when he and Roger Hawkenshaw, justice of the King's Bench, were ordered to prepare the Chancery writs, due to the Lord Chancellor's frequent absences, and to administer justice in those parts of the kingdom where the King's liege subjects could not repair to the Court of Chancery to prosecute their just causes, due to "the distance and danger of the way". With this record of judicial experience was he highly qualified to be Master of the Rolls. A detailed set of instructions from the Privy Council to Ashwell in 1427 survives, requiring him to examine the records of a lawsuit in the Court of Common Pleas (Ireland) "in the time of King Henry IV (1399-1410)", as, many years after the hearing, it was now being alleged that an injustice had been done to the defendant, the Prior of Mullingar.

== Later career ==
Robert also served as Deputy Lord Chancellor and Keeper of the Great Seal of Ireland on many occasions and was Deputy Escheator in 1380. In 1408, an extra payment to him (the actual amount is unclear as the entry in the Patent Roll is now illegible) was authorised, on account of his great "labour, burden, costs and expenses" as Keeper of the Great Seal. In the same year, he sat on a large commission to inquire into all treasons committed in County Wexford. He was appointed Chief Baron of the Irish Exchequer in 1401, but did not serve long. In 1410, while the Lord Chancellor was on assize in the south, Sutton was appointed to hear causes in the Chancellor's Court in Dublin for the benefit of those who dared not travel "on account of the dangers of the roads". He was reappointed Keeper in 1412, as the Lord Chancellor was wholly occupied with putting down a rebellion in County Wexford.

He was also a politician, and was summoned to the Irish Parliament at Kilkenny in 1390. He was Deputy Treasurer in 1403, and was instructed to grant an amnesty to the noted Irish leader Art Mór Mac Murchadha Caomhánach (Art MacMurrough-Kavanagh), King of Leinster, in 1409. In 1420 he witnessed the charter by which King Henry V guaranteed the liberties of the citizens of Dublin.

In 1423, he was praised for his laudable service to four English monarchs. In 1428, his nephew William Sutton was given a very large gift from the Crown of seventy silver pounds, presumably for services rendered. Robert died in 1430, when he must have been 90 or more.

== William Sutton ==
His nephew William took up office as Master of the Rolls in 1430, having obtained a promise of the office in 1423. He was probably the William Sutton (there were other men of that name in the public service then) who obtained Robert's old position as Clerk of the Crown in 1435. He died in 1437.
