= Richard de St. Martin =

Irish Anglican cleric

Richard de St. Martin, Vicar of Donabate, was Dean of St Patrick's Cathedral, Dublin from 1250 until 1275.

Religious titles
Preceded by Richard Gardiner	Dean of St Patrick's Cathedral, Dublin; 1250– 1250	Succeeded by John de Sandford
