= William FitzGuido =

Irish Anglican cleric

William FitzGuido, a Londoner, and Prebendary of Clondalkin, was appointed by Archbishop Archbishop Henry de Loundres to be Dean of St Patrick's Cathedral, Dublin in 1219 and served until 1238.

Religious titles
| Preceded by First incumbent | Dean of St Patrick's Cathedral, Dublin; 1219– 1238 | Succeeded by Richard Gardiner |
