= William de Whithurst =

English judge

William de Whithurst (died after 1350) was an English Crown official, who held office as a judge in Ireland.

He appears to have been a native of Gloucester, where he was the tenant of lands formerly held by William de Holyns. He was a clerk in the English Chancery by the mid-1320s, and he was said to have given "long and faithful service" to the Crown.

== Petitions of 1327 ==
The best evidence for his activities before 1346 lies in two petitions dating from 1331. William petitioned King Edward III for relief against his goods being distrained by the Exchequer for debts owed to the Crown by the late Edmund, Earl of Kent, the King's uncle, of whose property he had been appointed Keeper, claiming that he had a letter under the Privy Seal discharging him from liability for the debt; an endorsement on the petition shows that this plea was accepted. He also petitioned to be cleared of liability for a sum of £100 given to him by his former landlord, William de Holyns, on behalf of the late King Edward II, during the conflict which led to King Edward's final downfall in 1327, to pay the wages of the soldiers at Gloucester. He pleaded that he could produce no written evidence as to whether or not the wages had actually been paid since he had given the money to one Simon de Reading, a sergeant-at-arms in the King's household, and apparently, a royal servant of some importance, who had been hanged alongside Hugh Despenser the Younger in the political turmoil which followed the King's downfall, in November 1326.

== Later career ==
In 1344 he, with others, witnessed a lease from William, Lord of Caverswall to William Messeger of certain lands at Dulverne, Derbyshire. Another witness was Richard de Whithurst, possibly a relative.

In 1346, in consideration of his good service, King Edward III appointed him Master of the Rolls in Ireland; he served until about 1350 when he returned to England to become the parish priest of Brixham, Devon. The Patent Rolls for 1349 record a debt of forty shillings owed to him by William de Wode, which was to be levied in Northampton.

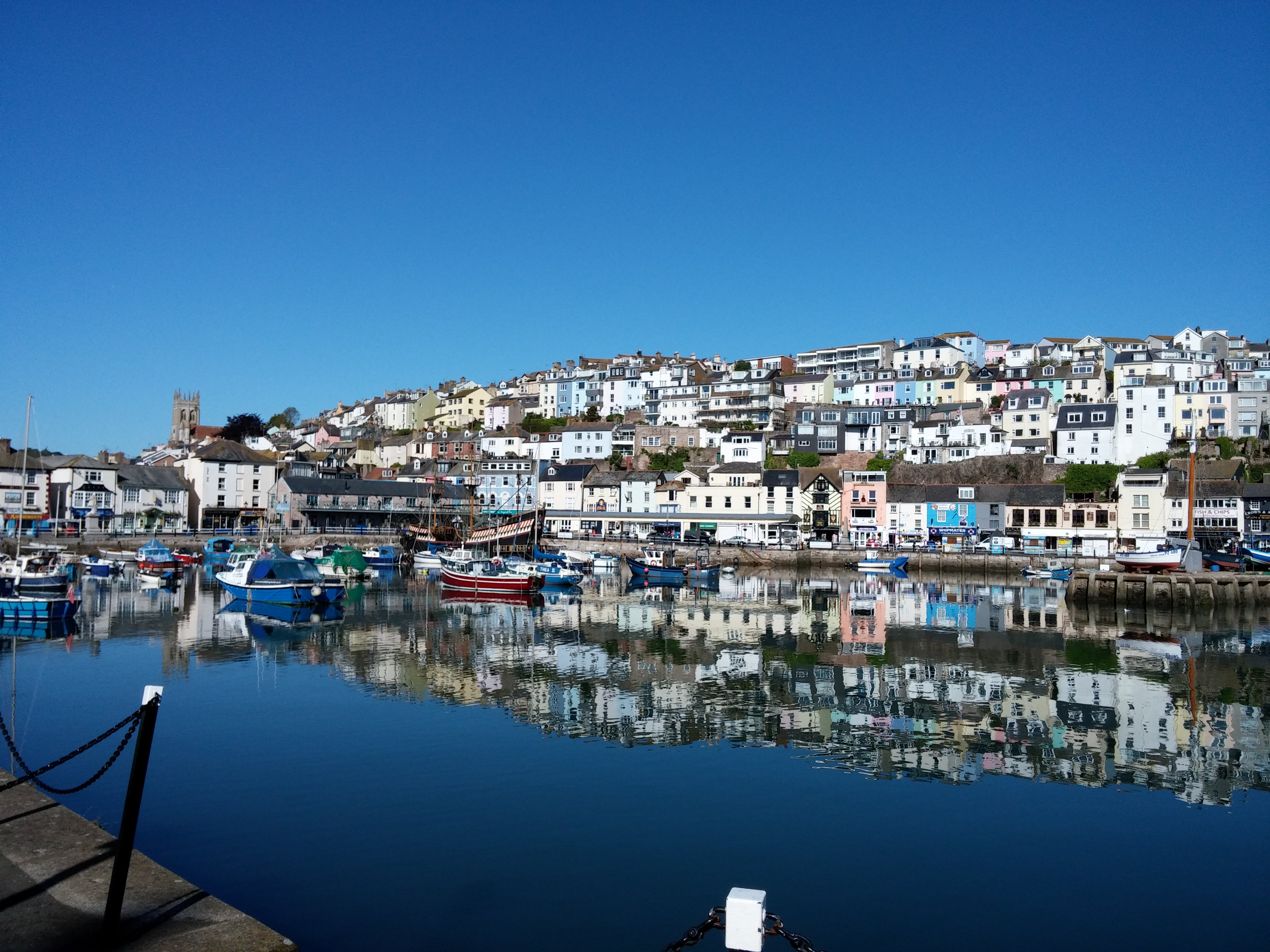
Brixham: William spent his last years as parish priest here

== Sources ==
- Ball, F. Elrington The Judges in Ireland 1221-1921 John Murray London 1926
- Calendar of the Close Rolls Preserved in the Public Record Office
- Derbyshire County Records
- Dodd, Gwilym Justice and Grace- Private Petitioning and the English Parliament in the Late Middle Ages Oxford University Press 2007
- National Archives Ref. SC8/239/11922
