= John Alleyne (priest) =

Irish priest; Dean of St Patrick's Cathedral, Dublin

John Alleyne (also spelled or misspelled Aleyn) was Dean of St Patrick's Cathedral, Dublin from 1466 until 1506, having previously been Precentor.

He was noted for charity: he built an almshouse on Kevin Street, on the grounds of St. Sepulchre's Palace, near the cathedral, and left most of his money for its support. In his will he directed that his body be buried under the statue of St Patrick in the nave of the cathedral. The nave collapsed due to neglect in 1554. He was also a Master in the Court of Chancery (Ireland).

In 1474, he clashed with the Archbishop of Dublin, John Walton, who attempted to impose his will on the Cathedral Chapter. Alleyne appealed directly to King Edward IV, and obtained his crucial support. Walton was reminded that it was illegal for any outsider to interfere in the Chapter's business.

Church of Ireland titles
Preceded by Philip Norris	Dean of St Patrick’s Cathedral, Dublin; 1466–1506	Succeeded by Thomas Rochfort
