= William de Bromley =

Crown official in Ireland

William de Bromley (died c.1370) was a 14th-century dignitary and Crown official in Ireland.

He was probably originally from Cheshire. He acted as an attorney to Elizabeth, Countess of Ormond. He was prebendary of Lusk, County Dublin. He was Chancellor of the Exchequer of Ireland from 1344 to 1346; Lord Chancellor of Ireland from 1346 to 1350; Dean of St Patrick's Cathedral, Dublin from 1353 until 1374; and Lord Treasurer of Ireland from 1354 until 1356.

As Treasurer, while collecting the King's revenue in Kilkenny, he clashed with the powerful and fractious Bishop of Ossory, Richard de Ledrede, who excommunicated him without any obvious cause. King Edward III, who is said to have lost £1000 as a result of the Bishop's interference, ordered the temporalities of the Diocese to be seized in compensation. The Bishop, who was notorious as a witch hunter and for his persecution of heretics, was an Englishman with few friends or allies in Ireland, and on realising the gravity of his mistake in offending the King, made a humble submission and received a pardon, although the King never liked or trusted him.

In 1365 Bromley complained to the Privy Council that he was being distrained for a fine of £200 imposed on him, he claimed illegally, by the Justiciar of Ireland, Sir Thomas de Rokeby. The Council ordered that the distraint cease while further inquiry was made.

Bromley may have died in 1370 when his prebend of Lusk was given to Robert de Lithum.

Preceded by Robert le Poer	Chancellor of the Exchequer of Ireland; 1344–1346	Succeeded by Robert de Emeldon
Preceded by John Morice	Lord Chancellor of Ireland; 1346–1350	Succeeded by John de St Paul
Preceded by Adam de Kingston	Dean of St Patrick’s Cathedral, Dublin; 1349–1374	Succeeded by John Colton
Preceded by Hugh de Burgh	Lord Treasurer of Ireland; 1354–1356	Succeeded by John Colton
