= Thomas de Rokeby (died 1356) =

English soldier and Crown official, Justiciar of Ireland

Sir Thomas de Rokeby (died 1356 or 1357) was a soldier and senior Crown official in fourteenth-century England and Ireland, who served as Justiciar of Ireland. He was appointed to that office to restore law and order to Ireland, and had considerable early success in this task, but he was recalled to England after the military situation deteriorated. He was later re-appointed Justiciar, and returned to Ireland to take up office, but died soon afterwards.

== Background ==
The Rokebys were a prominent landowning family from Mortham in North Yorkshire; Thomas was probably the son of Thomas de Rokeby, who died in 1318 (some sources name his father as Alexander). His nephew, also named Thomas, the son of his brother Robert, was closely associated with him in his later years and the elder Thomas was often called "l'oncle" to distinguish him from his nephew. It was almost certainly the nephew, not the uncle, who was the grandfather of the second Sir Thomas de Rokeby, who died sometime after 1423.

== Service in Scotland ==
Rokeby first came to public attention in 1327 when, after his return from prison in Scotland, he received the thanks of the new King Edward III for being the squire who had first pointed out the approach of the Scots army during the invasion of the previous July. As a reward, he was knighted and given lands worth £100 a year. He saw action against the Scots regularly between 1336 and 1342 and had charge of Stirling Castle and Edinburgh Castle while they were held by the English. He was High Sheriff of Yorkshire 1342–1349. He was one of the English commanders at the Battle of Neville's Cross in 1346, and it was said, "gave the Scots such a draught as they did not care to taste again". He was then entrusted with bringing King David II of Scotland as a captive to London, and he received further grants of land as a reward for his good services.

== Justiciar of Ireland ==
In 1349 he was appointed Justiciar of Ireland, and given a large armed retinue to accompany him, as it was recognised by the English Crown that "Ireland is not in good plight or good peace". While there was some surprise at the appointment of an old soldier to such a sensitive political position, the more informed view was that Rokeby would be well suited to the task of enforcing justice by military force. He arrived in December and made a quick circuit of the south of Ireland, mainly to keep watch on the powerful and troublesome magnate Maurice FitzGerald, 1st Earl of Desmond.

=== Administrative reforms ===
Rokeby was praised by his contemporaries for his regard for justice and his zeal in checking extortion by Crown officials. He undertook a general overhaul of the Irish administration, aimed particularly at the detection and prevention of corruption and the removal of incompetent officials. Arguably he showed excessive zeal in arresting and imprisoning the Treasurer of Ireland, Robert de Emeldon, a man who enjoyed the King's personal regard. Admittedly the charges against Emeldon were very serious, including rape, robbery and manslaughter, but Rokeby must have known that the King, out of regard for their long friendship and Emeldon's record of good service to the Crown in Ireland, had already pardoned Emeldon for killing one Ralph de Byrton, a knight, in 1336. Emeldon was once more pardoned and quickly released.

Not all those with whom Rokeby clashed were necessarily corrupt: William de Bromley, Emeldon's successor as Lord High Treasurer of Ireland, whose reputation was fair enough, later complained that Rokeby had fined him £200 without lawful authority.

In November 1351 Rokeby held a Great Council at Kilkenny. It dealt partly with the problem of official corruption already mentioned, partly with the problem of defence of the Pale, and partly with the question of intermarriage and other close contacts between the Anglo-Irish and the Old Irish. Otway-Ruthven notes that little of the legislation was new, apart from the application to Ireland of the English Statute of Labourers of 1351, and that much of it was repeated in the better-known Statutes of Kilkenny of 1366.

=== Military campaigns ===
In 1353 the Clan MacCarthy of Muskerry, the dominant clan in central County Cork, who had until then been loyal to the English Crown, rebelled. Rokeby showed considerable skill in crushing the uprising and succeeded in replacing the rebellious head of the clan, Dermot MacCarthy, with his more compliant cousin Cormac. Cormac's descendants gained great wealth, extensive lands and the title Earl of Clancarty.

This promising state of good order did not last long: a rebellion by the O'Byrne Clan of Wicklow in 1354 was followed by a general uprising headed by the MacMurrough-Kavanagh dynasty. Although Muirchearteach MacMurrough-Kavanagh, the self-styled King of Leinster, was captured and executed, Rokeby suffered several military defeats. He was unable to suppress the O'Byrnes' rebellion, and other risings took place in Tipperary, Kildare and Ulster.

== Recall and last years ==
Rokeby was now an ageing and discouraged man, and in 1355 it was decided to recall him. His replacement, rather surprisingly, was that Earl of Desmond whom it had been one of his main tasks to keep in check. Desmond died a year later on 26 July 1356. Rokeby was reappointed Justiciar, and returned to Ireland, only to die soon afterwards at Kilkea Castle.

He was married: his wife was named Juliana, but little else is known of her. They had no children, and his estates passed to his nephew, the younger Thomas.

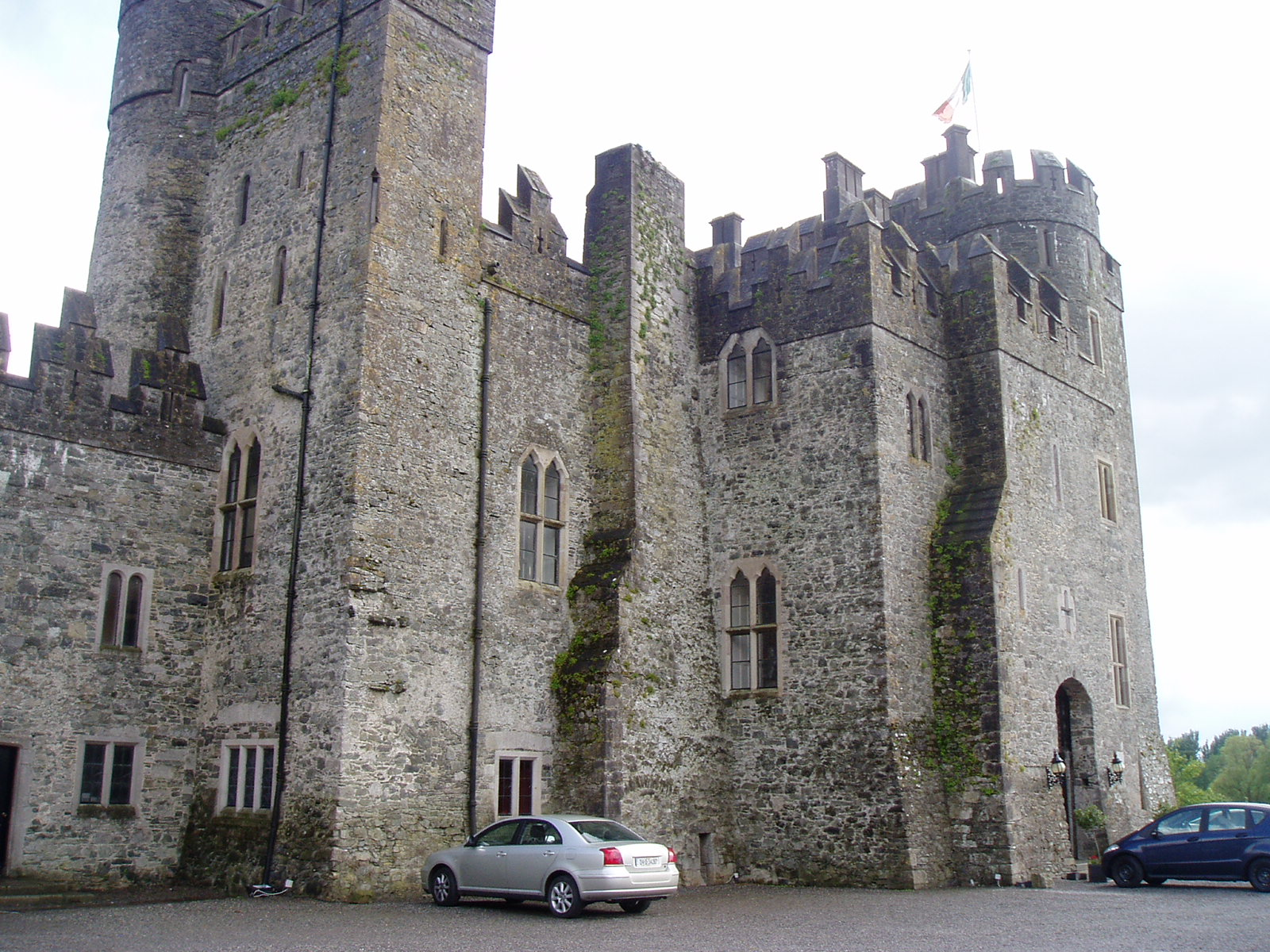
Kilkea Castle, Rokeby's Irish stronghold, where he died in 1356

== Character ==
Rokeby was a popular and respected figure in Ireland: he was described as "a just and prudent man, who paid well for his victuals, and did not rob the poor" (i.e. he did not abuse the much-criticized system of purveyance, the forcible requisition of foodstuffs from the public). He was also noted for his modest lifestyle: "I drink only from wooden vessels" is one of his recorded sayings. The citizens of Cork, protesting at his recall, referred to his "evident good work" in maintaining law and order. On the other hand, he could be high-handed, as in his clash with Lord Treasurer Bromley, who, unlike Emeldon was not suspected of corruption.

Otway-Ruthven contrasts his early successes with his disappointing later record, and notes that the 1350s was the crucial decade in which the English Crown lost control of much of Ireland until the sixteenth century.

Military offices
Preceded by John de Strivelyn	Governor of Edinburgh Castle; 1338-1340	Succeeded by Richard de Limoisen
Political offices
Preceded by John, Lord Carew	Justiciar of Ireland; 1349–1355	Succeeded by Maurice FitzGerald, 4th Earl of Kildare
Preceded by Maurice FitzGerald, 4th Earl of Kildare	Justiciar of Ireland; 1356	Succeeded by John de Boulton
Notes and references
1. https://www.british-history.ac.uk/edinburgh-burgh-records/1403-1528/pp287-291
