= Dean of St Patrick's Cathedral, Dublin =

Senior cleric office

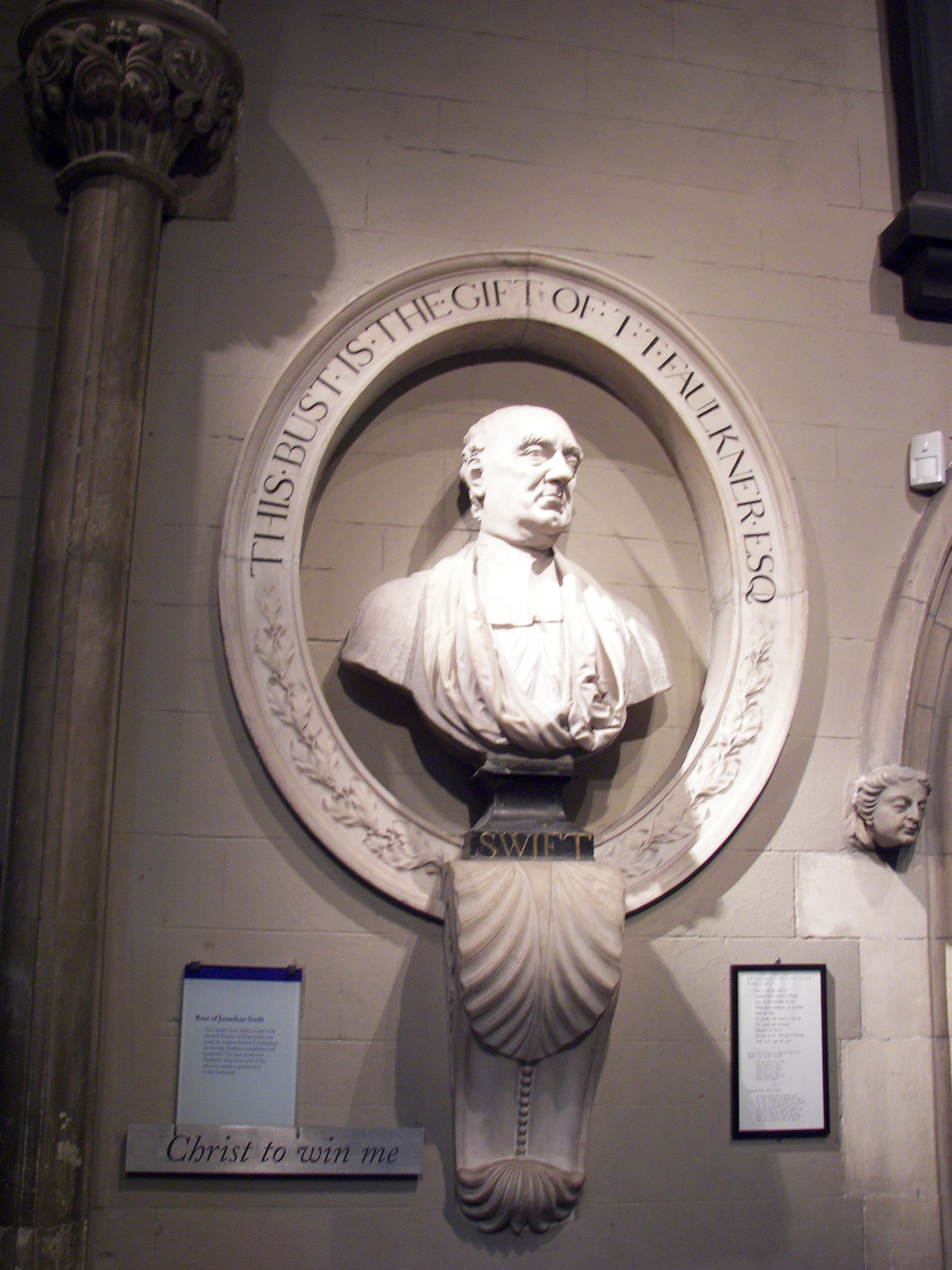
Bust of Jonathan Swift, the cathedral's best-known dean.

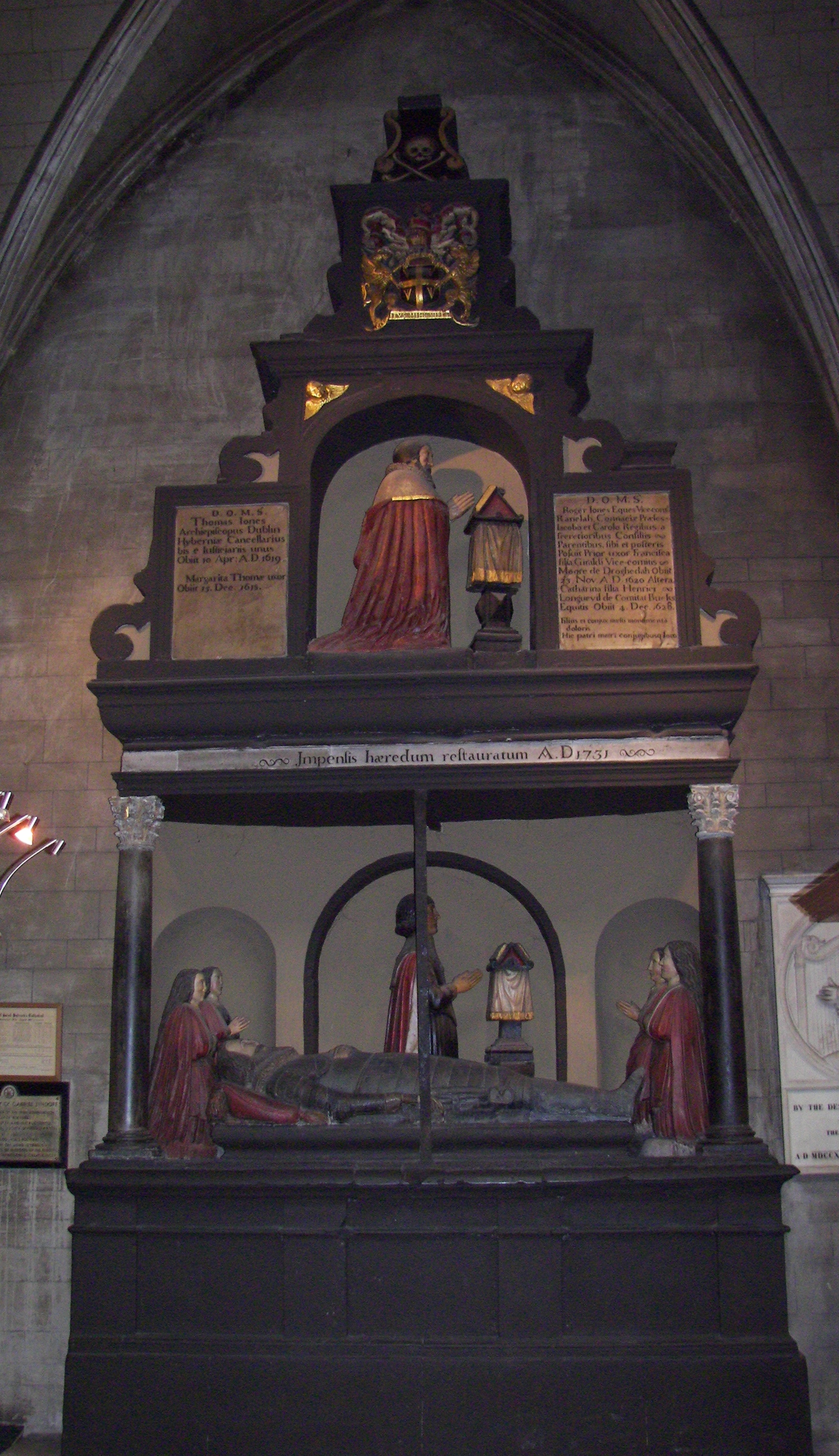
Cathedral memorial to the 16th-century dean Thomas Jones.

The Dean of St Patrick's Cathedral is the senior cleric of the Church of Ireland St Patrick's Cathedral, Dublin, elected by the chapter of the cathedral. The office was created in 1219 or 1220, by one of several charters granted to the cathedral by Archbishop Henry de Loundres between 1218 and 1220.

For centuries, the Dean of St. Patrick's was the only dean in Dublin and documents of those years often refer to him as the "Dean of Dublin" – but from around 1539 there was also the office of "Dean of Christ Church Cathedral", which had been a priory, headed by a prior and canons.

== Election ==
The right to elect the Dean of St. Patrick's is vested exclusively in the chapter of the cathedral (though before 1870 there could be an exception where a vacancy occurred due to the promotion of the dean to the office of a bishop) and has been defended against monarchs and even the Pope. Jonathan Swift, perhaps the most famous dean, was appointed against the strong opposition of Queen Anne, who disliked him. The Archbishop of Dublin has one of the 28 seats (the dean plus 3 other dignities and 24 canons), used only at the time of election, but no other special authority.

== Holders of the office of dean ==
The following have served as deans (where they are known to have previously held office at the cathedral, this is noted):

=== Pre-Reformation ===
- 1219–c.1238 – William FitzGuido, first dean, appointed by Archbishop Henry de Loundres
- c.1238–c.1250 – Richard Gardiner
- c.1250–1275 – Richard de St. Martin, a sitting prebendary
- 1275–1284 – John de Sandford, Franciscan, Prebendary of Howth; later Archbishop of Dublin (his brother Fulk Basset had earlier held that office)
- 1284–1311 – Thomas de Chaddesworth or Chadsworth, previously Chancellor of the Cathedral, unsuccessfully attempted twice to become Archbishop of Dublin, but was forced to stand down both times. Later appointed Vicar-General to the Archbishop.
- 1311–c.1338 – William de Rodyard, Treasurer; later, first Chancellor of the first University of Dublin and Chief Justice of the Irish Common Pleas
- 1338–c.1347 – Thomas de Montpellier, or Thomas de Monte Pessulano; also Chancellor of the Exchequer of Ireland and Chief Baron of the Irish Exchequer
- 1348–1353 – Adam de Kingston
- 1353–1374 – William de Bromley, Prebendary of Lusk; also Chancellor of the Exchequer of Ireland, and Treasurer of Ireland and Keeper of the Great Seal of Ireland
- 1374–1382 – John Colton (also Lord Chancellor of Ireland, 1379–1382 and afterwards Archbishop of Armagh in 1382)
- 1382–1391 – Henry Bowet, papal chaplain; became Bishop of Bath and Wells in 1401 and was Archbishop of York from 1407 to 1423
- 1392–1396 – William Chaumbre, formerly Archdeacon of Dublin
- 1396–1401 – Thomas de Everdon, a sitting prebendary; Master of the Rolls in Ireland.

"In this period, the Pope attempted to assume the power to appoint the Dean, nominating one Landulph, Cardinal of St. Nicholas. The King of England resisted this, and it was eventually conceded that the Chapter alone could choose the Dean – but see the 1401 appointment."

- 1401–?1428 – John Prene, appointed by Pope Boniface IX in breach of the Chapter's right of election but confirmed by the King in London after the dispute on rights was settled. (afterwards Archbishop of Armagh in 1439)
- ?1428–1457 – Nicholas Hill, Archdeacon of Dublin
- 1457–1466 – Philip Norris, Prebendary of Yagoe; excommunicated by the Pope for attacks on mendicant friars, but succeeded in getting the sentence reversed
- 1466–1506 – John Alleyne, Precentor
- 1506–1522 – Thomas Rochfort, Precentor (and Master of the Rolls in Ireland)
- 1522–1527 – John Rycardes (also Master of the Rolls in Ireland)
- 1527–1528 – Robert Sutton, Archdeacon of Dublin
- 1528–1529 – Thomas Darcy, Prebendary of Howth (and Master of the Rolls in Ireland)
- 1529–1537 – Geoffrey Fyche, Treasurer

=== Post-Reformation to Disestablishment ===
The Reformation took effect in Ireland following a hiatus in the office of Archbishop of Dublin after the death of Archbishop Alen in 1534, and the election of George Browne to that office by the Chapters of both Cathedrals under pressure from King Henry VIII.

- 1537–1547 – Edward Bassenet, a sitting prebendary, for whose election pressure was exerted by the State, Archbishop George Browne writing to the King that the Chapter had elected him "only in respect of your Grace's desire"

From 1547 to 1555, St. Patrick's was suppressed as a Foundation, reduced to the status of a parish church, without its Chapter or Dean – the Dean and other senior officials being pensioned off by the King. It was restored in 1555.

- 1555–1560 – Thomas Leverous, appointed by Queen Mary, formerly tutor to the powerful FitzGerald family; became Bishop of Kildare, and was one of the two Irish Bishops to refuse to take the Oath of Supremacy, after which he was deprived of both offices and ran a school in Adare
- 1560–1565 – Alexander Craike, Prebendary of Clonmethan; (also Bishop of Kildare)
- 1565–1567 – Adam Loftus, also Archbishop of Armagh, then resigned to become Archbishop of Dublin; later first Provost of Trinity College Dublin; died 1605
- 1567–1573 – Robert Weston (a layman, also Lord Chancellor of Ireland 1567–1573 and Dean of Wells 1570–1573)
- 1573–1581 – Sir William Gerard, a layman who was also Lord Chancellor of Ireland 1576–1581 (a contemporary wrote that he "confessed how greatly he had been tormented in conscience with keeping the deanery", but never relinquished it.)
- 1581–1585 – Thomas Jones, Chancellor; afterwards Bishop of Meath 1584 and then Archbishop of Dublin
- 1585–1597 – Richard Meredyth, (appointed Bishop of Leighlin 1589, with deanery in commendam)
- 1597–1608 – John Ryder, who became Bishop of Killaloe
- 1608–1625 – Thomas Moigne, Prebendary of Monmohenock; (appointed Bishop of Kilmore and Ardagh 1620, with deanery in commendam)
- 1625–1649 – Benjamin Culme (d.1657), of Molland-Champson and Canonsleigh, Devon, Prebendary of Mulhuddart

1649–1660 – office vacant during the period of Parliamentary governance; a Robert Chambers was appointed "Reader at St. Patrick's" following Dean Culme's retirement

- 1660–1666 – William Fuller, who became Bishop of Limerick 1663 and later of Bishop of Lincoln, and who composed an anthem for the Restoration in Ireland, celebrated on 27 January 1660 with the consecration at the cathedral of twelve bishops
- 1666–1675 – Thomas Seele, Chancellor; Fellow, and later Provost of Trinity College Dublin
- 1675–1678 – Benjamin Parry, Prebendary of Castleknock (became Bishop of Ossory 1677 with deanery in commendam)
- 1678–1689 – John Worth, Chancellor, previously Dean of Kildare
- 1689–1691 – William King, Chancellor, became Bishop of Derry 1691, later Archbishop of Dublin, Lord Justice; (1650–1729)
- 1691–1694 – Michael Jephson, previously Chancellor of Christ Church Cathedral
- 1694–1696 – Thomas Lindsay, became Bishop of Killaloe, Bishop of Raphoe, and then Archbishop of Armagh
- 1696–1699 – Edward Smyth, Fellow of Trinity College Dublin and Chaplain to King William III; became Vice-Chancellor of the University of Dublin and later Bishop of Down and Connor
- 1699–1705 – Jerome Ryves, previously Chancellor of Christ Church Cathedral
- 1705–1713 – John Sterne, Chancellor, rebuilt Dean's house in 1713; became Bishop of Dromore, and later of Clogher, and appointed Vice-Chancellor of the University of Dublin in 1721
- 1713–1745 – Jonathan Swift, Prebendary of Dunlavin; the famous writer
- 1745–1746 – Gabriel James Maturin, Prebendary of Mulhuddart; previously Dean of Kildare
- 1746–1775 – Francis Corbet, Treasurer
- 1775–1794 – William Cradock, Prebendary of St. Audoen's
- 1794– Robert Fowler later (1813), Bishop of Ossory
- 1794–1810 – James Verschoyle, previously a Minor Canon, Vicar-Choral, Prebendary, Archdeacon of Glendalough and Precentor; later, Bishop of Killala and Achonry, 1810
- 1810–1818 – John William Keatinge, last Chaplain to the Irish House of Commons
- 1818–1828 – Richard Ponsonby, Precentor; later Bishop of Killaloe, 1828 then Bishop of Derry
- 1828–1842 – Henry Richard Dawson, oversaw both some renovation of the building and reorganisation of worship
- 1842–1842 – Robert Daly, Prebendary of Stagonil; election subsequently contested; later Bishop of Cashel and Waterford
- 1843–1864 – Henry Pakenham

Note that from 1846 to 1872, the office of Dean of Christ Church was united to that of Dean of St. Patrick's.

- 1864–1889 – John West, Archdeacon of Dublin

=== Post-Disestablishment ===
- 1889–1901 – Henry Jellett, Prebendary of Tymothan and Archdeacon of Cloyne
- 1902–1911 – John Henry Bernard, Treasurer, later Bishop of Ossory, then Archbishop of Dublin and Provost of Trinity College Dublin
- 1911–1924 – Charles Thomas Ovenden, Prebendary of Monmohenock
- 1924–1933 – Hugh Jackson Lawlor, formerly Professor of Ecclesiastical History, Trinity College Dublin
- 1933–1935 – Thomas Arnold Harvey, afterwards Bishop of Cashel and Waterford, 1935
- 1935–1950 – David Frederick Ruddell Wilson
- 1950–1968 – William Cecil De Pauley
- 1958–1968 – John Ward Armstrong, afterwards Bishop of Cashel and Waterford, 1968 and later Archbishop of Armagh, 1980
- 1969–1991 – Victor Gilbert Benjamin Griffin
- 1991–1999 – Maurice Evan Stewart
- 1999–2012 – Robert MacCarthy
- 2012–2016 – Victor Stacey
- 2016–present – William Morton

== Sources ==
- London, G. Bell and Sons, 1924: St. Patrick's Cathedral Dublin; Bernard, J.H., former Dean of St. Patrick's, later Provost of Trinity College Dublin and Archbishop of Dublin
