= Maurice Stewart =

Irish Anglican clergyman

Maurice Evan Stewart (8 January 1929 – 18 October 2004) was an Irish Anglican clergyman. He was the Dean of St Patrick's Cathedral, Dublin in the Church of Ireland in the last decade of the 20th century.

Stewart was educated at the Royal Belfast Academical Institution and Trinity College, Dublin. He was ordained in 1952 and his first position was as a curate at St James' Belfast. He was chaplain at Bishop's College, Cheshunt from 1955 to 1958 and then Head of the TCD Mission in Belfast until 1961. He was rector of Newcastle, County Down from 1961 to 1969 when he returned to Trinity College Dublin as a lecturer in divinity, a position he held until his appointment as dean.

Church of Ireland titles
Preceded by Victor Gilbert Benjamin Griffin	Dean of St Patrick’s Cathedral, Dublin; 1991–1999	Succeeded by Robert MacCarthy
