= Michael Jephson =

Irish Anglican priest (1655–1693)

Michael Jephson, M.A. (b County Cork 9 May 1655 d 4 January 1693) was an Irish Anglican priest.

Jephson was educated at Trinity College, Dublin. He was Chaplain to Michael Boyle Archbishop of Armagh; Archdeacon of Leighlin from 1680 to 1683; Chancellor of Christ Church Cathedral, Dublin from 1683 to; and Dean of St. Patrick's Cathedral Dublin from 1691 until his death.
