= Thomas Darcy (judge) =

Irish cleric and judge

Thomas Darcy (died 1529) was an Irish cleric and judge: he was Master of the Rolls in Ireland and Dean of St. Patrick's Cathedral 1528–9.

Elrington Ball believes that he was a cousin of Sir William Darcy, who was for many years Vice-Treasurer of Ireland and author of the influential treatise The Decay of Ireland and its causes. The Darcys were a junior branch of the family of Baron Darcy de Knayth and had been settled at Platten, County Meath for several generations.

Thomas was Prebendary of Howth, and also Rector of the Parish; he became Master of the Rolls in 1522, with a fee of twenty silver pounds per annum, payable from the profits of the royal manr of Esker, near Lucan, (Esker had for centuries been reserved for favoured Crown servants), over and above the usual emoluments of the office. He was superseded the following year but reappointed in 1528. In April 1528 he was elected Dean of St. Patrick's but died in February of the following year.
