= Dean of Kildare =

Church of Ireland official

The Dean of Kildare is based at The Cathedral Church of St Brigid, Kildare in the united Diocese of Meath and Kildare within the Church of Ireland.

The current dean is the Very Reverend Tim Wright.

== List of deans of Kildare ==
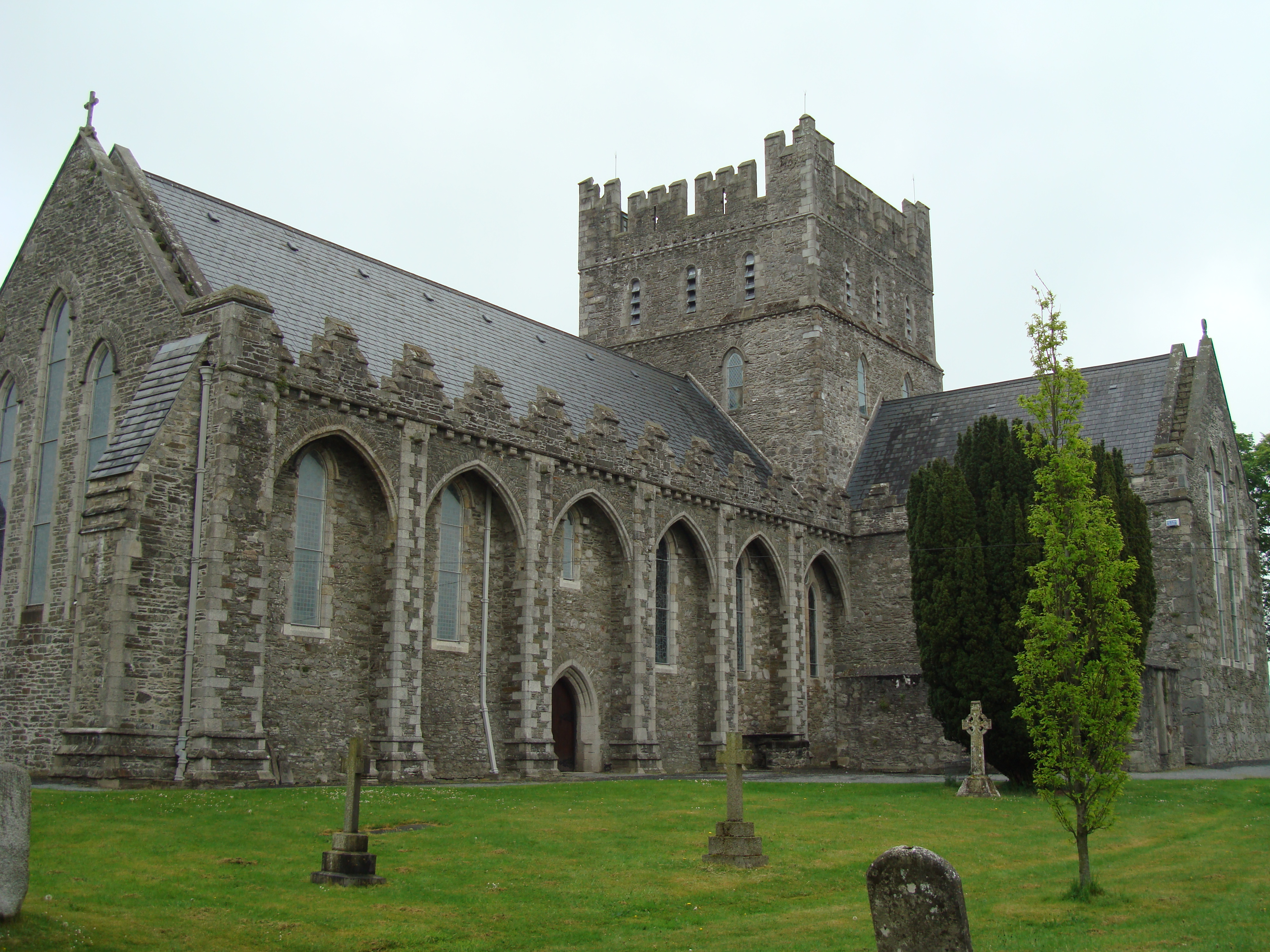
Kildare Cathedral

- 1272 - after 1279 Stephen (attempted to become Bishop of Kildare after the death of Bishop Simon in 1272, but could not secure Papal approval for his election)
- 1500 Nicholas Conyll
- 1521 Edward Dillon (afterwards Bishop of Kildare, 1526)
- ?–1540 William Miagh (afterwards Bishop of Kildare, 1540)
- David Stubin
- 1553 Denis Ellan
- Thomas Ellis
- 1610,1615 Walter Walsh
- 1625/6 Walter Cleborne
- 1660/1–1675 Christopher Golborne
- 1675–1677 John Worth (afterwards Dean of St Patrick's Cathedral, 1678)
- 1677/8–1678/9 Simon Digby (afterwards Bishop of Limerick, Ardfert and Aghadoe, 1678/9)
- 1679–1708 Samuel Synge
- 1708–1725 John Clayton
- 1725–1736 Sankey Winter
- 1736/7–1745 Gabriel James Maturin (afterwards Dean of St Patrick's Cathedral, 1745)
- 1746–1765 Philip Fletcher
- 1765–1771 William Fletcher
- 1772–1782 Edward Ledwich
- 1782–1787 Robert King
- 1787–1808 Dixie Blundell
- 1808–1809 Arthur John Preston (afterwards Dean of Limerick, 1809)
- 1809–1834 Thomas Trench
- 1834-1859 James Gregory
- 1859–?1890 Sir John Wolseley, 8th Baronet (died 1890)
- 1890–1913 George Young Cowell
- 1913 Edward Hardress Waller
- 1928–1938 Herbert Newcome Craig
- 1974–1989 John Paterson (afterwards Dean of Christ Church Cathedral, Dublin, 1989)
- ?–1995 Matthew Byrne
- 1995–2006 Robert Towneley
- 2006–2016 John Marsden
- 2016-2018 vacant
- 2018–2022 Tim Wright
- 2022-2023 vacant
- 2023-Present Isobel Jackson
