= Robert MacCarthy =

Revd Dr Robert Brian MacCarthy
- Born: 1940; Ireland
- Occupation: clergyman
- Notable work: "The Estates of Trinity College Dublin". "Ancient and Modern: A short History of the Church of Ireland"
- Title: Dean of St Patrick's Cathedral, Dublin
- Term: 1999–2012
- Predecessor: Maurice Stewart
- Successor: Victor Stacey

The Revd Dr Robert Brian MacCarthy is a clergyman in the Church of Ireland. He was Dean of Saint Patrick's Cathedral, Dublin from 1999 until his retirement in January 2012.

== Education and career ==
Born in 1940, MacCarthy was educated at St. Columba's College in Rathfarnham, Dublin. He continued his studies in Trinity College Dublin, St John's College, Cambridge, Trinity College, Oxford and Cuddesdon Theological College.

He received a Ph.D. in 19th century Irish history from Trinity College in 1983. Prior to his ordination in 1979, he spent twelve years in university administration at Reading University, Queen's University Belfast and Trinity College Dublin, where he became Assistant Secretary. He became curate of Carlow in 1979, a post he held until 1981 when he was appointed Librarian of Pusey House, Oxford and Fellow of St Cross College. In 1982 he was appointed Team Vicar in Bracknell New Town.

From 1986 to 1988 he was Bishop's Vicar in St Canice's Cathedral, Kilkenny. He became Rector of Castlecomer, County Kilkenny in 1988. From 1995 to 1999 he was Rector of St Nicholas' Collegiate Church, Galway and Provost of Tuam. He has been a member of the chapter since 1994, as the Prebendary of Monmohenock.

He was elected Dean of St Patrick's in 1999. Robert MacCarthy retired from his position as Dean of St Patrick's Cathedral on 25 January 2012.

== Publications and theology ==
His publications include The Estates of Trinity College Dublin (Dundalgan Press, 1992) and Ancient and Modern: A Short History of the Church of Ireland (Four Courts Press, 1995). More recently he has written a biography of John Henry Bernard (Linden Publishing, 2008).

MacCarthy has become known for his controversial opinions and liberal theology. He has been a champion of ecumenical dialogue and during his time a Roman Catholic and a former Moderator of the Presbyterian Church were elected to the cathedral's 24-person Chapter. After expressing doubts concerning the validity of some New Testament verses in our modern world, questions were raised over Dr. MacCarthy's claimed orthodoxy.

In October 2005 he gave a sermon which appeared in an abridged form in The Irish Times on 13 October 2005. It proved controversial, with one commentator in The Brandsma Review dubbing it The rubber-stamping of buggery. MacCarthy criticised the then Taoiseach Bertie Ahern for issuing a public invitation to a State reception for Cardinal Desmond Connell in 2001 in the joint names of the Taoiseach and his then partner. MacCarthy declined to attend and received over 300 letters of support, many from Roman Catholics.

In April 2008 in a letter to The Irish Times he referred to Muslims and Hindus as indoctrinating their children into "a cult". In St Patrick's he has been censured by both board and chapter. In 2011 he invited all seven presidential candidates to support his suggestion that St Patrick's should become a national ecumenical cathedral for all Christians in Ireland.
