= Philip Norris =

Priest of the Church of Ireland (1400–1465)

Philip Norris (c. 1400–1465), was born in Dundalk , and graduated from University College, Oxford, of which he was briefly Principal. He was Dean of St Patrick's Cathedral, Dublin from 1457 until 1465, having previously been Prebendary of Yagoe within the cathedral. He began his clerical career as vicar of St Nicholas, Dundalk, where he was largely an absentee pastor.

He was a famously eloquent preacher ("a resounding trumpet of sacred eloquence"), and a fine scholar. However he was also a notably controversial figure, due to his repeated attacks on the Orders of mendicant friars, which began when he was at Oxford. In particular, he denied the friars' right to exercise priestly authority or to hear confession. This was a long-standing controversy, on which other Irish clerics like Archbishop Fitzralph also had strong views.

His attacks became so vehement that at the request of the mendicant Orders, who accused him of heresy, Pope Eugene IV in 1440 excommunicated Norris. Norris fought vigorously to clear his name, and in 1443 he succeeded in having the sentence of excommunication reversed. The Orders were enjoined not to worry Norris in future, and if they had concerns about his orthodoxy, to engage in debate with him. His position was no doubt strengthened by the fact that the Archbishop of Armagh, Richard Fitzralph, held similar views which if possible he expressed even more vehemently.

Norris' last years seem to have been tranquil enough, though he had chronic ill health. He received a number of further benefices, including Prebendary of Mulhuddart, County Dublin, and the wealthy living of St Patrick's Church, Trim, County Meath (now Trim Cathedral).

Church of Ireland titles
Preceded by Nicholas Hill	Dean of St Patrick's Cathedral, Dublin; 1457–1465	Succeeded by John Alleyne
