= William Miagh =

Irish bishop (16th century)

William Miagh (sometimes Meagh) was a bishop in Ireland during the sixteenth century.

Previously Dean of Kildare he was nominated to the see of Kildare on 17 May 1644 by Henry VIII in opposition to the Pope's appointment. He died on 15 December 1548.
