= Edmund de Grimsby =

English cleric, Crown official and judge

Edmund de Grimsby, or de Grymesby (died 1354) was an English cleric, Crown official and judge. While his career in Ireland lasted only about a year, he is notable as having been the first Master of the Rolls in Ireland.

He derived his name from his birthplace of Grimsby, Lincolnshire. It is likely that he spent his last years there: certainly he retained close links with the town throughout his life, building several houses and endowing a chantry. In 1343 he agreed to make a grant of land, the rent from which would pay the salary of the chaplain attached to St. James' Church, Grimsby (now Grimsby Minster).

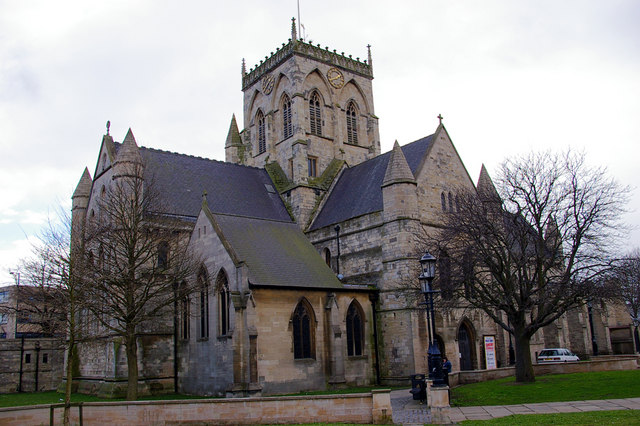
St. James' Church, Grimsby, now Grimsby Minster: this is the town's last surviving medieval church. In 1343 Edmund agreed to pay for its chaplain's salary.

He was presented as parish priest of East Keal in 1322 and of Preston in 1325; he also held the Scottish living of Moffat, Dumfriesshire. In later life, he received several further clerical preferments, notably as prebendary of St. Paul's Cathedral.

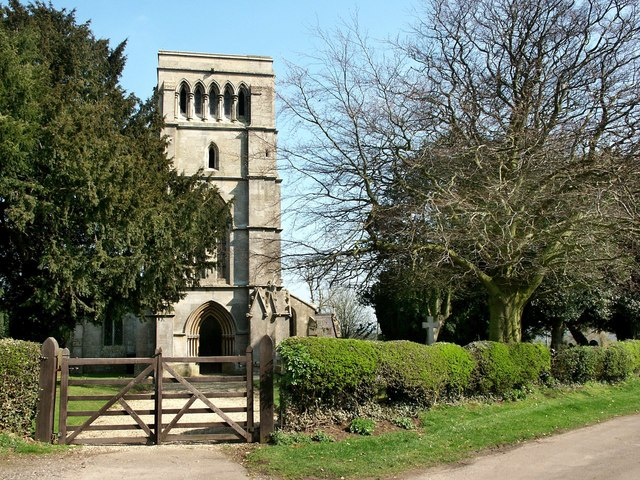
Church of St Helen, East Keal, where Grimsby was parish priest in the 1320s

In 1330, he was mentioned as being a royal clerk. In 1333 the Crown decided that the Lord Chancellor of Ireland required a Keeper or Master of the Rolls to assist him. Grimsby was appointed the first Master by letters patent: he did go to Ireland but returned to England a year later. He resumed his English position as a clerk in Chancery and had custody of the Great Seal in 1340 and 1351. He died in 1354.
