= Adam de Kingston =

Irish Anglican cleric

Adam de Kingston D.D. was Dean of St Patrick's Cathedral, Dublin from 1348 until 1353. Almost nothing else seems to be recorded of him.

Religious titles
Preceded by William de Rodyard	Dean of St Patrick's Cathedral, Dublin; 1348– 1353	Succeeded by William de Bromley
