= John Rycardes =

English-born official in Ireland

John Rycardes, or Rychard (died 1527) was an English-born cleric and judge in sixteenth-century Ireland. He held the offices of Master of the Rolls in Ireland and Dean of St Patrick's Cathedral, Dublin.

He was born in Yorkshire, possibly at Kirk Sandall. He was a cousin of William Rokeby, Archbishop of Dublin 1515–1521. He probably came to Ireland in Rokeby's entourage in 1507 on the latter's appointment as Bishop of Meath. Rycardes was appointed rector of Trim, County Meath. The Archbishop made him executor of his will and bequeathed him a ring.

Rycardes became Dean of St Patrick's in 1522 and Master of the Rolls in 1523. In the latter year he was given leave to reside at the English Court for ten years, probably as a precaution against his succumbing to bubonic plague or to the sweating sickness, both of which were rampant in Dublin in the 1520s. His successor as Dean, Robert Sutton, had a similar fear of disease, and never actually visited Dublin, or set foot in his Cathedral during his time as Dean.

Rycardes evidently did go to England but returned to Ireland in 1524; he was still alive at Christmas 1526, but died early the following year.
