= Richard Gardiner (Irish priest) =

Irish priest

Richard Gardiner was Dean of St Patrick's Cathedral, Dublin from 1238 until 1250.

Religious titles
Preceded by William FitzGuido	Dean of St Patrick's Cathedral, Dublin; 1238– 1250	Succeeded by Richard de St. Martin
