= Robert King (dean of Kildare) =

Robert King (1723–1787) was an 18th-century Anglican priest in Ireland.

He was born in Dublin and educated at Trinity College Dublin. He was Dean of Kildare from 1782 until his death.
