= Thomas Butler (judge) =

Irish judge

Thomas Butler (died after 1496) was an Irish judge, who held the office of Master of the Rolls in Ireland.

He was a cousin of John Butler, 6th Earl of Ormonde, although little is known of his own parents. The Butlers had backed the losing side in the Wars of the Roses, and Ormonde's brother James Butler, 5th Earl of Ormonde had been attainted and executed for treason as a result, but the 6th Earl was quickly pardoned by the new King Edward IV, who greatly admired him. Ormonde may have recommended his cousin as a royal servant: in 1478 Butler was groom of the King's chamber, while his wife Agnes was described as "former nurse to the royal children"; specifically she had been nurse to Anne of York, the King's fifth daughter, who was born in November 1475. Thomas was bailiff of the royal manors of Solihull and Yardley.

In 1492 he was sent back to Ireland as Master of the Rolls in Ireland. It is unclear what legal qualifications, if any, he had for the office. The Master of the Rolls at that time was not always a qualified lawyer, as his duties were primarily administrative. His appointment was probably part of a campaign by the new Tudor dynasty to curb the power of the Anglo-Irish gentry, which included nearly all the judges, who had openly backed the pretender Lambert Simnel and were now suspected of aiding another pretender, Perkin Warbeck. Gerald FitzGerald, 8th Earl of Kildare, who had for many years been all-powerful in Ireland, was in temporary disgrace, and between 1492 and 1494 those judges who were regarded as his creatures were removed. Butler, though he himself belonged to a great Anglo-Irish dynasty, was presumably considered to be a loyal servant of the Crown: unlike many of their peers, they had supported the House of Lancaster, from whom the Tudor dynasty derived its claim to the Throne.

From 1496 on Kildare quickly regained much of his influence, and Butler resigned or was removed from the Mastership of the Rolls in that year. His date of death is not recorded.
