= Master of the Rolls (Ireland) =

British judicial office in Ireland

The Master of the Rolls in Ireland was a senior judicial office in the Irish Chancery under English and British rule, and was equivalent to the Master of the Rolls in the English Chancery. Originally called the Keeper of the Rolls, he was responsible for the safekeeping of the Chancery records such as close rolls and patent rolls. The office was created by letters patent in 1333, the first holder of the office being Edmund de Grimsby. As the Irish bureaucracy expanded, the duties of the Master of the Rolls came to be performed by subordinates and the position became a sinecure which was awarded to political allies of the Dublin Castle administration. In the nineteenth century, it became a senior judicial appointment, ranking second within the Court of Chancery behind the Lord Chancellor of Ireland. The post was abolished by the Courts of Justice Act 1924, passed by the Irish Free State established in 1922.

== History of the Office ==
Until the sixteenth century, the Master of the Rolls was always a clergyman. The office in its early centuries was closely associated with St. Patrick's Cathedral, Dublin: several medieval Masters of the Rolls served as either Dean or Prebendary of the Cathedral. The office was originally an administrative rather than a judicial office, and not all of the early Masters were qualified lawyers. As late as the mid-sixteenth century the office was held by John Parker, a layman who had made a fortune from selling hats; nor was his successor, Henry Draycott, as far as is known, a lawyer; yet both performed the duties assigned to them competently and were valued public servants. At that time, as the older title Keeper of the Rolls suggests, the Master's principal role was to have custody of the Chancery records. This office should not be confused with the separate office (long since obsolete) of Keeper of Writs and Rolls in the Court of the Justiciar of Ireland.

The Master might act through a Deputy if he was incapacitated or absent on official business, although no actual office of Deputy Master is known to have existed. William Sutton acted as Deputy to his uncle Robert Sutton in the 1420s and Thomas Archbold deputised for Thomas Dowdall in 1479.

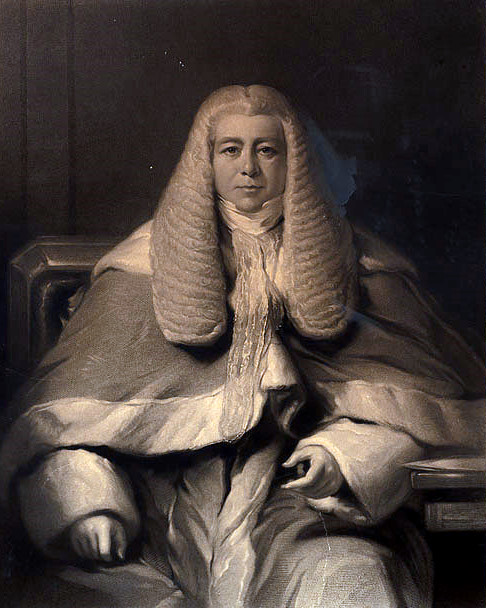
Francis Blackburne, Master of the Rolls 1842-6

In the seventeenth and eighteenth centuries, the office of Master was notoriously a sinecure for absentee politicians, some of them British. Some of the appointments have been described as "farcical". Richard Rigby is said never to have set foot in Ireland during the 30 years he held the office, and William FitzGerald, 2nd Duke of Leinster, who succeeded him, had no qualifications whatever for judicial office.

== Nineteenth-century reforms ==
In the nineteenth century, the office became a full-time judicial position: the Master acted as Deputy to the Lord Chancellor of Ireland, with full powers to hear any lawsuit brought in the Court of Chancery. A number of gifted judges, including Sir Michael Smith, Edward Sullivan and Andrew Marshall Porter greatly enhanced the reputation of the office. Michael O'Loghlen was notable not only as a fine judge but as the first Roman Catholic appointed to the Bench since 1688. The office was offered to Daniel O'Connell, who admitted that it was the only office he truly wanted but who nonetheless refused it. Charles Andrew O'Connor, the last holder of the office, was sufficiently highly regarded to be appointed a judge of the new Supreme Court of the Irish Free State.

== Supersession ==
The 1922 Constitution of the Irish Free State prescribed a new court system for the new State but allowed the existing system, based on the Supreme Court of Judicature Act (Ireland) 1877, to persist as a transitional measure. In 1923, Charles Andrew O'Connor as Master of the Rolls participated in the Judiciary Committee established by the Free State Executive Council which planned the Courts of Justice Act 1924. In this capacity he caused controversy by refusing to admit an affidavit written in Irish because he did not know the language. When the 1924 Act was passed, O'Connor became a judge of the new Supreme Court. The officers of the Chamber of the Master of the Rolls were transferred in 1926 to the Examiner's Office.

== List of Masters of the Rolls in Ireland ==
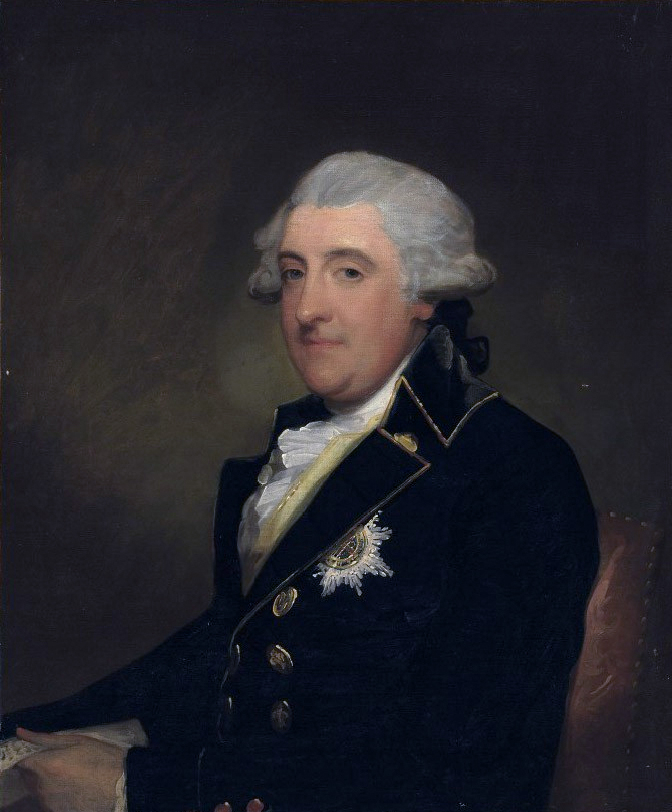
2nd Duke of Leinster, Master of the Rolls 1788-9, which was a sinecure position, as he lacked legal qualifications

- 1333 Edmund de Grimsby
- 1334 William de Bardelby
- 1337 Robert de Hemmingburgh
- 1346 William de Whithurst
- 1350 Robert (or Henry) de Leycestre
- c.1370 Thomas de Cottingham
- 1372 Thomas de Thelwall, later Chancellor of the Duchy of Lancaster (England)
- 1377 Robert Sutton, later Chief Baron of the Irish Exchequer, first term
- 1386 Thomas de Everdon, Dean of St. Patrick's Cathedral
- 1395 Robert de Faryngton, or de Farrington, later Lord High Treasurer of Ireland
- 1395 Robert Sutton, second term
- 1395 John de Kirkby
- 1404 Robert Sutton, third term
- 1427 Richard Ashwell
- 1430 William Sutton
- 1436 Robert Dyke, later Lord High Treasurer of Ireland
- 1450 John Chevir, later Lord Chief Justice of Ireland
- 1461 Patrick Cogley (exchanged the position for Clerk of the Crown and Hanaper)
- 1461 Peter Trevers
- 1471 Thomas Dowdall
- 1492 Thomas Butler
- 1496 John Payne, Bishop of Meath
- 1513 Thomas Rochfort, Dean of St. Patrick's Cathedral
- 1521 Walter Wellesley, Bishop of Kildare
- 1522 Thomas Darcy, Dean of St. Patrick's Cathedral, first term
- 1523 John Rycardes, Dean of St. Patrick's Cathedral
- 1528 Thomas Darcy, second term
- 1530 Anthony Skeffington
- 1533 John Alan, later Lord Chancellor of Ireland
- 1539 Robert Cowley
- 1542 Thomas Cusack, later Lord Chancellor of Ireland
- 1543 Nicholas Wycombe
- 1550 Patrick Barnewall
- 1552 John Parker
- 1566 Henry Draycott
- 1572 Nicholas White, first term
- 1578 Edward Fitz-Symon
- 1578 Nicholas White, second term
- 1593 Anthony St Leger
- 1609 Francis Aungier, 1st Baron Aungier of Longford
- 1633 Christopher Wandesford
- 1641 Sir John Temple
- 1677 Sir William Temple, 1st Baronet, first term
- 1689 Sir William Talbot, 3rd Baronet
- 1690 Sir William Temple, second term
- 1696 William Berkeley, 4th Baron Berkeley of Stratton
- 1731 Thomas Carter
- 1754 Henry Singleton
- 1759 Richard Rigby
- 1788 William Robert Fitzgerald, 2nd Duke of Leinster
- 1789 John Crosbie, 2nd Earl of Glandore and John Proby, 1st Earl of Carysfort (jointly)
- 1801 Sir Michael Smith, 1st Baronet
- 1806 John Philpot Curran
- 1814 Sir William MacMahon, 1st Baronet
- 1837 Sir Michael O'Loghlen, 1st Baronet
- 1842 Francis Blackburne
- 1846 Thomas Berry Cusack Smith
- 1866 John Edward Walsh
- 1870 Sir Edward Sullivan, 1st Baronet
- 1883 Sir Andrew Porter, 1st Baronet
- 1906 Richard Edmund Meredith
- 1912–1924 Charles Andrew O'Connor (last holder)

The office was abolished in 1924.

== See also ==
- Master of the Rolls

== Sources ==
- The Judges in Ireland 1221–1921, F. Elrington Ball, 1926
- Chronicle of the Law Officers of Ireland Constantine Joseph Smyth 1839
