= William Cradock (dean of St Patrick's) =

Irish Priest and Dean of St Patrick's Cathedral

William Cradock (b Wolverhampton 28 June 1741 - d Edinburgh 1 May 1793) was an Irish Anglican priest in the 18th-century.

Cradock was educated at Shrewsbury School and St John's College, Cambridge. He was Archdeacon of Kilmore from 1770 until 1775; and Dean of St Patrick's Cathedral, Dublin from then until his death.
