= List of chief governors of Ireland =

The office of chief governor of Ireland existed under various names from the 12th-century Anglo-Norman invasion to the creation of the Irish Free State on 6 December 1922. Common names were (Chief) justiciar (13th–14th centuries); (King's) lieutenant (14th–16th century); (Lord) Deputy (15th–17th centuries), and Lord Lieutenant (standard after 1690). The unofficial term Viceroy was also common.

Reasons for difficulty in stating terms of office include that many left the office empty for a period (sometimes to return to the Court of St. James's, sometimes to return to their British estates) before either being replaced or returning. There is difficulty in getting clear information before 1529; in the earlier years, there were frequent long vacancies, during which a Lord Deputy or Lord Justice would act as chief governor. The Irish Act of Union merged the Kingdom of Ireland with the Kingdom of Great Britain to form the United Kingdom of Great Britain and Ireland. The new United Kingdom came into being on 1 January 1801 resulting in the disappearance of the separate Irish Parliament: Though many expected the office of Lord Lieutenant to be abolished, it survived. Periodic debates throughout the nineteenth century erupt over whether it should be replaced by a 'Secretary of State for Ireland'. The office of Chief Secretary for Ireland (in effect number two in Irish government ranking) grew in importance, with the Lord Lieutenant gradually reduced to a largely though not completely ceremonial role.

The office was replaced by the Governor-General of the Irish Free State. In Northern Ireland the position was replaced by that of Governor of Northern Ireland.

== Medieval ==
=== Under the House of Anjou ===
- Hugh de Lacy, Lord of Meath: 1172–73
- William FitzAldelm: 1173
- Richard de Clare, 2nd Earl of Pembroke (Strongbow): 1173–1176
- William FitzAldelm: 1176–1177
- Hugh de Lacy, Lord of Meath: 1177–1181
- John fitz Richard, Baron of Halton, Constable of Chester and Richard Peche, Bishop of Lichfield, jointly: 1181
- Hugh de Lacy, Lord of Meath and Hubert Walter, Bishop of Salisbury, jointly: (1181–1184)
- Philip de Worcester: 1184–1185
- John de Courcy: 1185–1192
- William le Petit & Walter de Lacy, Lord of Meath: 1192–1194
- Walter de Lacy, Lord of Meath & John de Courcy: 1194–1195
- Hamo de Valognes: 1195–1198
- Meiler Fitzhenry: 1198–1208
- John de Gray, Bishop of Norwich: 1208–1213
- William le Petit 1211: (during John's absence)
- Henry de Loundres, Archbishop of Dublin: 1213–1215
- Geoffrey de Marisco: 1215–1221

=== Under the House of Plantagenet ===
- Henry de Loundres, Archbishop of Dublin: 1221–1224
- William Marshal, 2nd Earl of Pembroke: 1224–1226
- Geoffrey de Marisco: 1226–1228
- Richard Mor de Burgh: 1228–1232
- Hubert de Burgh, 1st Earl of Kent: 1232 (held the office formally, but never came to Ireland)
- Maurice FitzGerald, 2nd Lord of Offaly: 1232–1245
- Sir John Fitz Geoffrey: 1246–1256
- Sir Richard de la Rochelle: 1256
- Alan de la Zouche: 1256–1258
- Stephen Longespée: 1258–1260
- William Dean: 1260–1261
- Sir Richard de la Rochelle: 1261–1266
- David de Barry: 1266–1268
- Robert d'Ufford: 1268–1270
- James de Audley: 1270–1272
- Maurice Fitzmaurice Fitzgerald: 1272–1273
- Geoffrey de Geneville: 1273–1276
- Sir Robert D'Ufford: 1276–1281
- Stephen de Fulbourn, Archbishop of Tuam: 1281–1288
- John de Sandford, Archbishop of Dublin: 1288–1290
- Sir Guillaume de Vesci: 1290–1294
- Sir Walter de la Haye: 1294
- William fitz Roger, prior of Kilmainham: 1294
- Guillaume D'Ardingselles: 1294–1295
- Thomas Fitzmaurice Fitzgerald: 1295
- Sir John Wogan: 1295–1308
- Edmund Butler: 1304–1305 (while Wogan was in Scotland)
- Piers Gaveston: 1308–1309
- Sir John Wogan: 1309–1312
- Edmund Butler, Earl of Carrick: 1312–1314
- Theobald de Verdun, 2nd Baron Verdun: 1314–1315
- Edmund Butler, Earl of Carrick: 1315–1318
- Roger Mortimer, 1st Earl of March: 1317–1318
- William FitzJohn, Archbishop of Cashel: 1318
- Alexander de Bicknor, Archbishop of Dublin: 1318–19
- Roger Mortimer, 1st Earl of March: 1319–1320
- Thomas FitzGerald, 2nd Earl of Kildare: 1320–1321
- Sir Ralph de Gorges: 1321 (appointment ineffective)
- John de Bermingham, 1st Earl of Louth: 1321–1324
- John D'Arcy: 1324–1327
- Thomas FitzGerald, 2nd Earl of Kildare: 1327–1328
- Roger Utlagh: 1328–1329
- John D'Arcy: 1329–1331
- William Donn de Burgh, 3rd Earl of Ulster: 1331–1331
- Anthony de Lucy: 1331–1332
- John D'Arcy: 1332–1338 (Lords Deputy: Sir Thomas de Burgh: 1333–1337 and Sir John Charlton: 1337–1338)
- Thomas Charleton, Bishop of Hereford: 1338–1340
- Roger Utlagh: 1340
- Sir John d'Arcy: 1340–1344 (Lord Deputy: Sir John Morice (or Moriz))
- Sir Raoul d'Ufford: 1344–1346 (died in office in April 1346)
- Roger Darcy: 1346
- Sir John Moriz, or Morice: 1346–1346
- Sir Walter de Bermingham: 1346–1347
- John L'Archers, Prior of Kilmainham: 1347–1348
- Sir Walter de Bermingham: 1348–1349
- John, Lord Carew: 1349
- Sir Thomas de Rokeby: 1349–1355
- Maurice FitzGerald, 4th Earl of Kildare: 1355–1355
- Maurice FitzGerald, 1st Earl of Desmond: 1355–1356
- Maurice FitzGerald, 4th Earl of Kildare: 1356
- Sir Thomas de Rokeby: 1356–1357
- John de Boulton: 1357
- Maurice FitzGerald, 4th Earl of Kildare: 1357
- Almaric de St. Amaud, Lord Gormanston: 1357–1359
- James Butler, 2nd Earl of Ormond: 1359–1360
- Maurice FitzGerald, 4th Earl of Kildare: 1361
- Lionel of Antwerp, 5th Earl of Ulster (later Duke of Clarence): 1361–1364
- James Butler, 2nd Earl of Ormond: 1364–1365
- Lionel of Antwerp, Duke of Clarence: 1365–1366
- Thomas de la Dale: 1366–1367
- Gerald FitzGerald, 3rd Earl of Desmond: 1367–1369, a.k.a. Gearóid Iarla
- Sir William de Windsor: 1369–1376
- James Butler, 2nd Earl of Ormond: 1376–1378
- Alexander de Balscot and John de Bromwich: 1378–1380
- Edmund Mortimer, 3rd Earl of March: 1380–1381
- Roger Mortimer, 4th Earl of March: 1382 (first term, aged 11, Lord Deputy: Sir Thomas Mortimer)
- Sir Philip Courtenay: 1385–1386
- Robert de Vere, Duke of Ireland: 1386
- Alexander de Balscot, Bishop of Meath: 1387–1389
- Sir John Stanley, King of Mann: 1389–1391 (first term)
- James Butler, 3rd Earl of Ormond: 1391
- Thomas of Woodstock, Duke of Gloucester: 1392–1395
- Roger Mortimer, 4th Earl of March: 1395–1398 (second term)
- Thomas Holland, Duke of Surrey: 1399

=== Under the Houses of York and Lancaster ===
- Sir John Stanley: 1399–1402 (second term)
- Thomas of Lancaster, 1st Duke of Clarence: 1402–1405 (aged 13)
- James Butler, 3rd Earl of Ormond: 1405
- Gerald FitzGerald, 5th Earl of Kildare: 1405–1408
- Thomas of Lancaster, 1st Duke of Clarence: 1408–1413
- Sir John Stanley: 1413–1414 (third term)
- Thomas Cranley, Archbishop of Dublin: 1414
- John Talbot, 1st Earl of Shrewsbury: 1414–1421 (first term)
- James Butler, 4th Earl of Ormond: 1419–1421 (first term)
- Edmund Mortimer, 5th Earl of March: 1423–1425
- John Talbot, 1st Earl of Shrewsbury: 1425 (second term)
- James Butler, 4th Earl of Ormond: 1425–1427
- Sir John Grey: 1427–1428
- John Sutton, later 1st Lord Dudley: 1428–1429
- Sir Thomas le Strange: 1429–1431
- Thomas Stanley, 1st Baron Stanley: 1431–1436
- Lionel de Welles, 6th Baron Welles: 1438–1446
- John Talbot, 1st Earl of Shrewsbury: 1446 (third term)
- Richard of York, 3rd Duke of York: 1447–1460 (Lord Deputy: Thomas FitzGerald, 7th Earl of Kildare)
- George Plantagenet, Duke of Clarence: 1462–1478 (Lords Deputy: Thomas FitzGerald, 7th Earl of Desmond/Thomas FitzGerald, 7th Earl of Kildare)
- John de la Pole, 2nd Duke of Suffolk: 1478
- Richard of Shrewsbury, Duke of York: 1478–1483 (aged 5. Lord Deputy: Gerald FitzGerald, 8th Earl of Kildare)
- Edward of Middleham, Prince of Wales: 1483–1484 (aged 11. Lord Deputy: Gerald FitzGerald, 8th Earl of Kildare)
- John de la Pole, Earl of Lincoln: 1484–1485

=== Under the House of Tudor ===
- Jasper Tudor, 1st Duke of Bedford: 1485–1494 (Lord Deputy: Gerald FitzGerald, 8th Earl of Kildare)
- Henry, Duke of York: 1494–?1519 (Aged 4. Lords Deputy: Sir Edward Poynings, Gerald FitzGerald, 8th Earl of Kildare, Gerald FitzGerald, 9th Earl of Kildare)
- Thomas Howard, 2nd Duke of Norfolk: 1519–1523 (Lord Deputy: Thomas Howard, Earl of Surrey)

== Lords Deputy ==
=== Under the House of Tudor ===
- Piers Butler, Earl of Ossory: 1523–1524
- Gerald FitzGerald, 9th Earl of Kildare: 1524–1529
- Henry FitzRoy, 1st Duke of Richmond and Somerset: 22 June 1529 (aged 10); deputies to whom included
  - Sir William Skeffington: 1529–1532
  - Gerald FitzGerald, 9th Earl of Kildare: 1532–1534
  - Sir William Skeffington: 30 July 1534
- Leonard Grey, 1st Viscount Grane: 23 February 1536 – 1540 (executed, 1540)
- Lords Justices: 1 April 1540
- Sir Anthony St Leger: 7 July 1540 (first term)
- Sir Edward Bellingham: 22 April 1548
- Lords Justices: 27 December 1549
- Sir Anthony St Leger: 4 August 1550 (second term)
- Sir James Croft: 29 April 1551
- Lords Justices: 6 December 1552
- Sir Anthony St Leger: 1 September 1553 – 1556 (third term)
- Thomas Radcliffe, Viscount FitzWalter: 27 April 1556
- Lords Justices: 12 December 1558
- Thomas Radcliffe, 3rd Earl of Sussex (Lord Deputy): 3 July 1559
- Thomas Radcliffe, 3rd Earl of Sussex (Lord Lieutenant): 6 May 1560
- Sir Henry Sidney: 13 October 1565
- Lord Justice: 1 April 1571
- Sir William FitzWilliam: 11 December 1571
- Sir Henry Sidney: 5 August 1575
- Lord Justice: 27 April 1578
- Arthur Grey, 14th Baron Grey of Wilton: 15 July 1580
- Lords Justices: 14 July 1582
- Sir John Perrot: 7 January 1584
- Sir William FitzWilliam: 17 February 1588
- Sir William Russell: 16 May 1594
- Thomas Burgh, 3rd Baron Burgh: 5 March 1597
- Lords Justices: 29 October 1597
- Robert Devereux, 2nd Earl of Essex 12 March 1599
- Lords Justices: 24 September 1599
- Charles Blount, 8th Baron Mountjoy (Lord Deputy): 21 January 1600

=== Under the House of Stuart ===
- Charles Blount, 8th Baron Mountjoy (Lord Lieutenant): 25 April 1603
- Sir Arthur Chichester: 15 October 1604
- Sir Oliver St John: 2 July 1616
- Henry Cary, 1st Viscount Falkland: 18 September 1622
- Lords Justices: 8 August 1629
- Thomas Wentworth, 1st Viscount Wentworth later Earl of Strafford: 3 July 1633 (executed May 1641)
- Robert Sidney, 2nd Earl of Leicester (Lord Lieutenant): 14 June 1641
- James Butler, 1st Marquess of Ormonde: 13 November 1643 (appointed by the king)
- Philip Sidney, Viscount Lisle: 9 April 1646 (appointed by parliament, commission expired 15 April 1647)
- James Butler, 1st Marquess of Ormonde: 30 September 1648 (appointed by the King)

=== During the Interregnum ===
- Oliver Cromwell (Lord Lieutenant): 22 June 1649
- Henry Ireton (Lord Deputy): 2 July 1650 (d. 20 November 1651)
- Charles Fleetwood (Lord Deputy): 9 July 1652
- Henry Cromwell (Lord Deputy): 17 November 1657
- Henry Cromwell (Lord Lieutenant): 6 October 1658, resigned 15 June 1659
- Edmund Ludlow (Commander-in-Chief): 4 July 1659

== Lords Lieutenant ==
=== Under the House of Stuart ===
- George Monck, 1st Duke of Albemarle: June 1660
- James Butler, 1st Duke of Ormonde: 21 February 1662
- Thomas Butler, 6th Earl of Ossory (Lord Deputy): 7 February 1668
- John Robartes, 2nd Baron Robartes: 3 May 1669
- John Berkeley, 1st Baron Berkeley of Stratton: 4 February 1670
- Arthur Capell, 1st Earl of Essex: 21 May 1672
- James Butler, 1st Duke of Ormonde: 24 May 1677
- Richard Butler, 1st Earl of Arran: 13 April 1682
- James Butler, 1st Duke of Ormonde: 19 August 1684
- Lords Justices: 24 February 1685
- Henry Hyde, 2nd Earl of Clarendon: 1 October 1685
- Richard Talbot, 1st Earl of Tyrconnell (Lord Deputy): 8 January 1687
- King James II himself in Ireland: 12 March 1689 – 4 July 1690
- King William III himself in Ireland: 14 June 1690
- Lords Justices: 5 September 1690
- Henry Sydney, 1st Viscount Sydney: 18 March 1692
- Lords Justices: 13 June 1693
- Henry Capell, 1st Baron Capell (Lord Deputy): 9 May 1695
- Lords Justices: 16 May 1696
- Laurence Hyde, 1st Earl of Rochester: 28 December 1700
- James Butler, 2nd Duke of Ormonde: 19 February 1703
- Thomas Herbert, 8th Earl of Pembroke: 30 April 1707
- Thomas Wharton, 1st Earl of Wharton: 4 December 1708
- James Butler, 2nd Duke of Ormonde: 26 October 1710
- Charles Talbot, 1st Duke of Shrewsbury: 22 September 1713

=== Under the House of Hanover ===
- Charles Spencer, 3rd Earl of Sunderland: 21 September 1714
- Lords Justices: 6 September 1715
- Charles Townshend, 2nd Viscount Townshend: 13 February 1717
- Charles Paulet, 2nd Duke of Bolton: 27 April 1717
- Charles Fitzroy, 2nd Duke of Grafton: 18 June 1720
- John Carteret, Baron Carteret: 6 May 1724
- Lionel Sackville, 1st Duke of Dorset: 23 June 1730
- William Cavendish, 3rd Duke of Devonshire: 9 April 1737
- Philip Stanhope, 4th Earl of Chesterfield: 8 January 1745
- William Stanhope, 1st Earl of Harrington: 15 November 1746
- Lionel Sackville, 1st Duke of Dorset: 15 December 1750
- William Cavendish, 4th Duke of Devonshire: 2 April 1755
- John Russell, 4th Duke of Bedford: 3 January 1757
- George Montagu-Dunk, 2nd Earl of Halifax: 3 April 1761
- Hugh Percy, 2nd Earl of Northumberland: 27 April 1763
- Thomas Thynne, 3rd Viscount Weymouth: 5 June 1765
- Francis Seymour-Conway, 1st Earl of Hertford: 7 August 1765
- George Hervey, 2nd Earl of Bristol: 16 October 1766 (did not assume office)
- George Townshend, 4th Viscount Townshend: 19 August 1767
- Simon Harcourt, 1st Earl Harcourt: 29 October 1772
- John Hobart, 2nd Earl of Buckinghamshire: 7 December 1776
- Frederick Howard, 5th Earl of Carlisle: 29 November 1780
- William Cavendish-Bentinck, 3rd Duke of Portland: 8 April 1782
- George Nugent-Temple-Grenville, 3rd Earl Temple: 15 August 1782
- Robert Henley, 2nd Earl of Northington: 3 May 1783
- Charles Manners, 4th Duke of Rutland: 12 February 1784
- George Nugent-Temple-Grenville, 1st Marquess of Buckingham: 27 October 1787
- John Fane, 10th Earl of Westmorland: 24 October 1789
- William Wentworth-FitzWilliam, 2nd Earl FitzWilliam: 13 December 1794
- John Pratt, 2nd Earl Camden: 13 March 1795
- Charles Cornwallis, 1st Marquess Cornwallis: 14 June 1798

== United Kingdom of Great Britain and Ireland ==
=== Under the House of Hanover ===
- Philip Yorke, 3rd Earl of Hardwicke: 27 April 1801
- Edward Clive, 1st Earl of Powis: 21 November 1805 (did not serve)
- John Russell, 6th Duke of Bedford: 12 March 1806
- Charles Lennox, 4th Duke of Richmond: 11 April 1807
- Charles Whitworth, 1st Viscount Whitworth: 23 June 1813
- Charles Chetwynd-Talbot, 2nd Earl Talbot: 3 October 1817
- Richard Wellesley, 1st Marquess Wellesley: 8 December 1821
- Henry Paget, 1st Marquess of Anglesey: 27 February 1828
- Hugh Percy, 3rd Duke of Northumberland: 22 January 1829
- Henry Paget, 1st Marquess of Anglesey: 4 December 1830
- Richard Wellesley, 1st Marquess Wellesley: 12 September 1833
- Thomas Hamilton, 9th Earl of Haddington: 1 January 1835
- Constantine Phipps, 2nd Earl of Mulgrave: 29 April 1835
- Hugh Fortescue, Viscount Ebrington: 13 March 1839
- Thomas de Grey, 2nd Earl de Grey: 11 September 1841
- William à Court, 1st Baron Heytesbury: 17 July 1844
- John Ponsonby, 4th Earl of Bessborough: 8 July 1846
- George Villiers, 4th Earl of Clarendon: 22 May 1847
- Archibald Montgomerie, 13th Earl of Eglinton: 1 March 1852
- Edward Eliot, 3rd Earl of St Germans: 5 January 1853
- George Howard, 7th Earl of Carlisle: 7 March 1855
- Archibald Montgomerie, 13th Earl of Eglinton: 8 March 1858
- George Howard, 7th Earl of Carlisle: 24 June 1859
- John Wodehouse, 3rd Baron Wodehouse: 1 November 1864
- James Hamilton 2nd Marquess of Abercorn: 13 July 1866
- John Spencer, 5th Earl Spencer: 18 December 1868
- James Hamilton, 1st Duke of Abercorn: 2 March 1874
- John Spencer-Churchill, 7th Duke of Marlborough: 11 December 1876
- Francis Cowper, 7th Earl Cowper: 4 May 1880
- John Spencer, 5th Earl Spencer: 4 May 1882
- Henry Herbert, 4th Earl of Carnarvon: 27 June 1885
- John Hamilton-Gordon, 7th Earl of Aberdeen: 8 February 1886
- Charles Vane-Tempest-Stewart, 6th Marquess of Londonderry: 3 August 1886
- Lawrence Dundas, 3rd Earl of Zetland: 30 July 1889
- Robert Offley Ashburton Milnes, 2nd Baron Houghton: 18 August 1892
- George Cadogan, 5th Earl Cadogan: 29 June 1895

=== Under the House of Saxe-Coburg and Gotha (later Windsor) ===
- William Ward, 2nd Earl of Dudley: 11 August 1902
- John Hamilton-Gordon, 7th Earl of Aberdeen: 11 December 1905
- Ivor Guest, 2nd Baron Wimborne: 17 February 1915
- John French, 1st Viscount French: 9 May 1918
- Edmund FitzAlan-Howard, 1st Viscount FitzAlan of Derwent: 27 April 1921

== See also ==
- Lord Deputy of Ireland
- Lord Justices (Ireland)
