= Henry Dawson (priest) =

Irish antiquarian and cleric

Henry Richard Dawson (23 December 1792 – 24 October 1840) was the Church of Ireland Dean of St. Patrick's Cathedral, Dublin from 1828 to 1840, and Rector of Castlecomer, County Kilkenny. He was also Vice-President of the Royal Irish Academy in 1840 and a noted Irish antiquarian.

== Early life and education ==
Henry Richard Dawson, born on 23 December 1792, was the second son and sixth child of Catherine Dawson (née Monck) and Arthur Dawson, of Castledawson, County Londonderry. His great-grandfather was Joshua Dawson, who was responsible for the development of Dublin’s Dawson Street and the surrounding area.

Dawson spent his childhood with his family at 22 Merrion Square, Dublin. He then went to Harrow to be educated, where he formed a friendship with George Sackville, 4th Duke of Dorset. They both went on to Christ Church, Oxford, where Dawson’s interest in antiquities began to develop. By the time he had completed his studies there, he had already built a valuable collection of Roman coins. He was said to have been deeply affected by the untimely death of the Duke in 1815, following a fall from his horse.

Sometime after he completed his M.A. at Christ Church, Dawson was ordained by his uncle, William Beresford, the Archbishop of Tuam. Following successive appointments at Dunmore in the Diocese of Ossory, County Kilkenny, and Drumcondra in the Diocese of Meath, he was made Rector of Castlecomer, also in the Diocese of Ossory. This culminated in his appointment as Dean of St. Patrick’s, Dublin in 1828.

== Dean of St. Patrick’s Cathedral ==
During his tenure at St. Patrick’s Cathedral, Dawson commissioned a series of renovations to the cathedral, mostly to the western front. However, as Dean, he was less known for his renovations, which were largely redone in the 1860s by Benjamin Lee Guinness, and more for his work in his surrounding diocese.

Upon his arrival, he undertook a census of the people living in the deanery liberties, and found them to be in far greater number and in far worse conditions than had been previously thought. He established schools in an effort to educate the population, from young children to adults, and was generally esteemed for his charitable works in the area. This was reflected in his other position at Castlecomer, where he introduced the Church Education Society to promote primary school education and worked tirelessly with the members of Castlecomer’s impoverished coal-mining community.

== Antiquarian activity and legacy ==
Throughout his ministerial career, Dawson always remained an ardent antiquarian. He sat on the Royal Irish Academy’s Committee of Antiquities and was appointed Vice-President by Sir William Rowan Hamilton in 1840, a position he held until his death later that year. Since his time at Harrow, Dawson had been an active collector of antiquities, with a particular interest in medals. His collection of artefacts exceeded 2000 in number, all of which he had hoped would one day be held in the Royal Irish Academy.

However, Dawson’s wishes were almost unfulfilled when, in 1840, he caught typhus during the course of his work and died shortly thereafter, on 24 October, aged 48. He was survived by his wife, Frances Dawson (née Heseltine), and son, Arthur. It was soon discovered that Dawson had not yet made a will detailing his intention to donate the collection, thereby leaving it to the disposal of his family.

Fearing it would be dispersed and sold, the members of the Royal Irish Academy opened a subscription to purchase the Irish part of his collection in its entirety. They raised just over £1000, which was then offered to his wife, following valuation of the collection by Aquilla Smith and George Petrie. The sum was accepted, and in spite of a delay in collection of the subscription, the collection was moved to the Royal Irish Academy in 1842, making a substantial contribution to its Museum collection. Dawson is buried beneath the floor at the west end of the nave in St Patrick’s Cathedral and was the last person to be interred within the building.
