= Jacqueline Le Moigne =

Computer scientist and geoscientist

Jacqueline J. Le Moigne is a computer scientist and geoscientist specializing in remote sensing including research on image registration and satellite-based on-board data processing. Educated in France, she works in the US for NASA as program manager for Advanced Information Systems Technology in the Earth Science Technology Office.

== Education and career ==
Le Moigne studied at Pierre and Marie Curie University in Paris, where she received bachelor's and master's degrees in mathematics and a Ph.D. in computer science, with a dissertation on biomedical imaging. She was a researcher in computer vision at the University of Maryland, before starting work for NASA in 1998. She became assistant chief for technology at the Goddard Space Flight Center Software Division before moving to her present position in the Earth Science Technology Office.

== Recognition ==
In 2012, at NASA Goddard, Le Moigne received the NASA Exceptional Service Medal and the Goddard Information Science and Technology Award. She was named to the 2025 class of IEEE Fellows "for contributions to satellite image registration and intelligent space systems design".
