= Geoffrey Fyche =

16th-century Irish cleric

Geoffrey Fyche was Dean of St Patrick's Cathedral, Dublin from his election on 9 March 1529 until his death on 8 April 1537.

Fyche was Prebendary of St Audeon's at St Patrick's from 1495 to 1509; Archdeacon of Glendalough from 1509 until 1523; and Treasurer of St Patrick's from 1523 to 1529. He is commemorated by an impressive brass monument and inscription in the cathedral.

He came from a family with a strong ecclesiastical tradition: he was almost certainly a relative, possibly a younger brother, of Thomas Fich or Fyche (died 1517), sub-prior of the convent of Holy Trinity, now Christchurch Cathedral, Dublin and author of the compilation of memoranda called the White Book of Christ Church, Dublin still preserved in the cathedral.

During the Rebellion of Silken Thomas, Fyche strongly condemned the murder of John Alen, Archbishop of Dublin, by the rebels in 1534. After the failure of the Rebellion, however, Thomas Cromwell, who clearly wished to be rid of Fyche, accused him of undue sympathy for the rebels, and unsuccessfully sought to force his resignation from the Deanery. By 1537 Cromwell had evidently dropped the matter, but Fyche died soon afterwards.
