= Arthur Murray Preston =

US Navy officer (1913–1968)

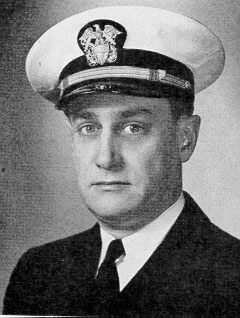
- Born: November 1, 1913; Maryland, US
- Died: January 7, 1968 (aged 54); Chevy Chase, Maryland, US
- Burial place: Arlington National Cemetery
- Military career
- Allegiance: United States of America
- Branch: United States Navy Reserve
- Service years: 1940–1953
- Rank: Commander
- Unit: Torpedo Boat Squadron 33
- Conflicts: World War II
- Awards: Medal of Honor
- Other work: Banker

Arthur Murray Preston (November 1, 1913 – January 7, 1968) was a United States Navy officer and a recipient of the United States military's highest decoration—the Medal of Honor—for his actions in World War II.

== Biography ==
He graduated from Phillips Academy in 1931, Yale University, and the University of Virginia School of Law in 1938. Preston was a practicing attorney when he joined the Navy from Washington, D.C., in September 1940.

He was stationed at Naval Station Pearl Harbor, Hawaii, on December 7, 1941, and participated in the recovery operations. In 1943, he was a PT boat instructor in Newport, Rhode Island, and was friends with LTJG John F. Kennedy, USNR. By September 16, 1944, he was serving as a lieutenant in Torpedo Boat Squadron 33. On that day, Preston commanded two PT boats in the successful rescue of a downed Navy pilot in Wasile Bay, Halmahera Island in Indonesia, despite intense fire from Japanese forces. He was subsequently promoted to lieutenant commander and awarded the Medal of Honor. Preston reached the rank of commander before leaving the Navy.

He died at age 54 and was buried in Arlington National Cemetery, Arlington County, Virginia.

== Medal of Honor citation ==
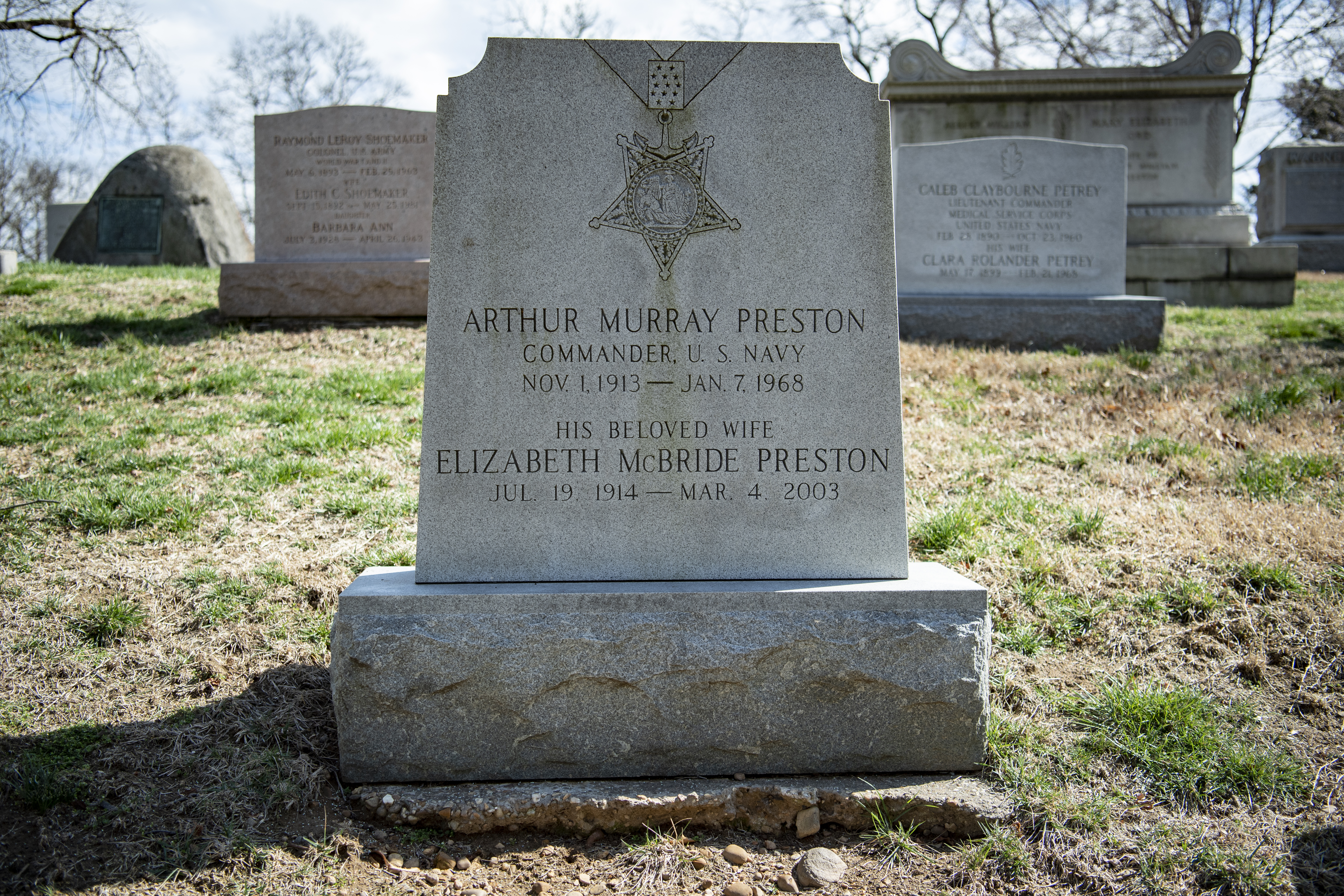
Grave at Arlington National Cemetery

Preston's official Medal of Honor citation reads:

For conspicuous gallantry and intrepidity at the risk of his life above and beyond the call of duty as commander, Motor Torpedo Boat Squadron 33, while effecting the rescue of a Navy pilot shot down in Wasile Bay, Halmahera Island, less than 200 yards from a strongly defended Japanese dock and supply area, September 16, 1944. Volunteering for a perilous mission unsuccessfully attempted by the pilot's squadron mates and a PBY plane, Lt. Comdr. (then Lieutenant) Preston led PT-489 and PT-363 through 60 miles of restricted, heavily mined waters. Twice turned back while running the gauntlet of fire from powerful coastal defense guns guarding the 11-mile strait at the entrance to the bay, he was again turned back by furious fire in the immediate area of the downed airman. Aided by an aircraft smoke screen, he finally succeeded in reaching his objective and, under vicious fire delivered at 150-yard range, took the pilot aboard and cleared the area, sinking a small hostile cargo vessel with 40-mm. fire during retirement. Increasingly vulnerable when covering aircraft were forced to leave because of insufficient fuel, Lt. Comdr. Preston raced PT boats 489 and 363 at high speed for 20 minutes through shell-splashed water and across minefields to safety. Under continuous fire for 2 1/2 hours, Lt. Comdr. Preston successfully achieved a mission considered suicidal in its tremendous hazards, and brought his boats through without personnel casualties and with but superficial damage from shrapnel. His exceptional daring and great personal valor enhance the finest traditions of the U.S. Naval Service.

== Awards and decorations ==

1st row	Medal of Honor		
2nd row	Combat Action Ribbon Retroactively Awarded, 1999	American Defense Service Medal with Base Clasp	American Campaign Medal
4th row	Asiatic-Pacific Campaign Medal with 2 Campaign stars	World War II Victory Medal	National Defense Service Medal

== See also ==
- List of Medal of Honor recipients
