= Eugene Woods =

Eugene Woods was an Archdeacon in Ireland in the late 16th and early 17th centuries.

Woods was from Anglesea. He graduated B.A from Jesus College, Oxford on 29 June 1580; and M.A. on 6 July 1584. He held incumbencies at Llanbeulan, Ewelme and Great Cheverell. He was Archdeacon of Meath from 1595 to 1606 and Chaplain to the King from 1606 until his death in 1609.
