= Bishop of Kilmore and Ardagh =

The Bishop of Kilmore and Ardagh was the Ordinary of the Church of Ireland diocese of Kilmore and Ardagh in the Province of Armagh. The Diocese of Kilmore composed most of County Cavan and parts of counties Leitrim, Fermanagh, Meath and Sligo. The Diocese of Ardagh comprised most of County Longford and parts of counties Cavan and Roscommon.

The Episcopal sees of Kilmore and Ardagh were intermittently combined in the 17th and 18th centuries until they were finally united in 1839. They were combined further with Elphin in 1841 to form the united bishopric of Kilmore, Elphin and Ardagh.

== List of Bishops of Kilmore and Ardagh ==
Bishops of Kilmore and Ardagh
From	Until	Incumbent	Notes
1604	1612	Robert Draper	Nominated on 9 December 1603 and appointed by letters patent on 2 March 1604. Died in August 1612.
1613	1629	Thomas Moigne	Nominated on 6 December 1612 and consecrated on 12 January 1613. Died on 1 January 1629.
1629	1633	William Bedell	Formerly Provost of Trinity College Dublin 1627–1629. Nominated on 16 April 1629 and consecrated on 13 September 1629. Relinquished the title bishop of Ardagh in 1633 but continued as the separate bishop of Kilmore until his death in 1642.
1633	1661	During this period, Kilmore and Ardagh were again separate sees	
1661	1672	Robert Maxwell	Appointed Bishop of Kilmore in 1643, he became Bishop of Kilmore and Ardagh in 1661 when the two sees were reunited. Died on 1 November 1672.
1673	1682	Francis Marsh	Translated from Limerick, Ardfert and Aghadoe. Nominated on 4 December 1672 and appointed by letters patent on 10 January 1673. Translated to Dublin on 14 February 1682.
1682	1691	William Sheridan	Nominated on 14 January 1682 and consecrated on 19 February 1682. Deprived of the see for not taking the oaths to William III and Mary II in 1691. Died on 1 October 1711.
1691	1693	See vacant	During this period, Ulysses Burgh was consecrated Bishop of Ardagh in 1692, but died later in the same year.
1693	1699	William Smyth	Translated from Raphoe. Appointed by letters patent on 5 April 1693. Died on 24 February 1699.
1699	1713	Edward Wetenhall	Translated from Cork and Ross. Nominated on 19 March 1699 and appointed by letters patent on 18 April 1699. Died 12 November 1713.
1715	1727	Timothy Godwin	Nominated on 7 October 1714 and consecrated on 16 January 1715. Translated to Cashel on 3 July 1727.
1727	1742	Josiah Hort	Translated from Ferns and Leighlin. Appointed by letters patent on 27 July 1727. Translated to Tuam on 21 January 1742.
1742	1839	During this period, Kilmore was again a separate see, and Ardagh was united to the see of Tuam	
1839	1841	George de la Poer Beresford	Appointed Bishop of Kilmore in 1802, he became Bishop of Kilmore and Ardagh in 1839 when the two sees were reunited. Died on 15 October 1841.
Since 1841, the see has been part of the united bishopric of Kilmore, Elphin and Ardagh.

== Bibliography ==
- Fryde, E. B.; Greenway, D. E.; Porter, S.; Roy, I., eds. (1986). Handbook of British Chronology (3rd, reprinted 2003 ed.). Cambridge: Cambridge University Press. ISBN 0-521-56350-X.
