= Francis Corbet =

Irish Anglican Dean

Francis Corbet, D.D. was an Irish Anglican Dean.

Educated at Trinity College, Dublin, he was Treasurer of St Patrick’s Cathedral, Dublin from 1734 to 1750; and Dean from 1746 until his death on 25 August 1775.
