= John Prene =

Irish Archbishop

John Prene was an Irish Archbishop.

He was Dean of St Patrick's Cathedral, Dublin from 1401 until 1428; Archdeacon of Armagh from 1431 to 1439 and Archbishop of Armagh from 1439 until his death on 13 June 1443. His appointment as Dean of St Patrick's by the Pope was in breach of his agreement with the English Crown that only the Cathedral Chapter would elect the Dean, but King Henry IV of England, after reasserting the Chapter's right of election, subsequently confirmed Prene's appointment and granted a pardon to those who had been involved in the unlawful appointment.

He may have been a nephew of John Prene, Archdeacon of Meath. He studied at the University of Oxford, and graduated with degrees in civil and canon law. He was attached to the court of the Archbishop of Armagh from 1425, and Archbishop Swayne sent him to Rome in 1428 to answer certain complaints against the Archbishop. He was Swayne's obvious successor: as Archbishop he is said to have been conscientious, but not very effective, in performing his duties.
