= Arthur Preston (priest) =

Irish Anglican priest (1761–1844)

Arthur John Preston (26 April 1761 – 3 November 1844) was an Anglican priest in Ireland at the end of 18th and the beginning of the 19th centuries.

He was born in Dublin and educated at Trinity College, Dublin. Preston was appointed a Canon of Kildare Cathedral in 1793; and Dean of Kildare in 1808. In 1809 he became Dean of Limerick, a post he held until his death.
