= Robert Draper (bishop) =

The Rt. Rev. Robert Draper was an Anglican bishop in Ireland.

Draper was Rector of Trim, County Meath. He was Bishop of Kilmore and Ardagh from 1604 until 1612.
