= Benjamin Culme =

English Anglican clergyman

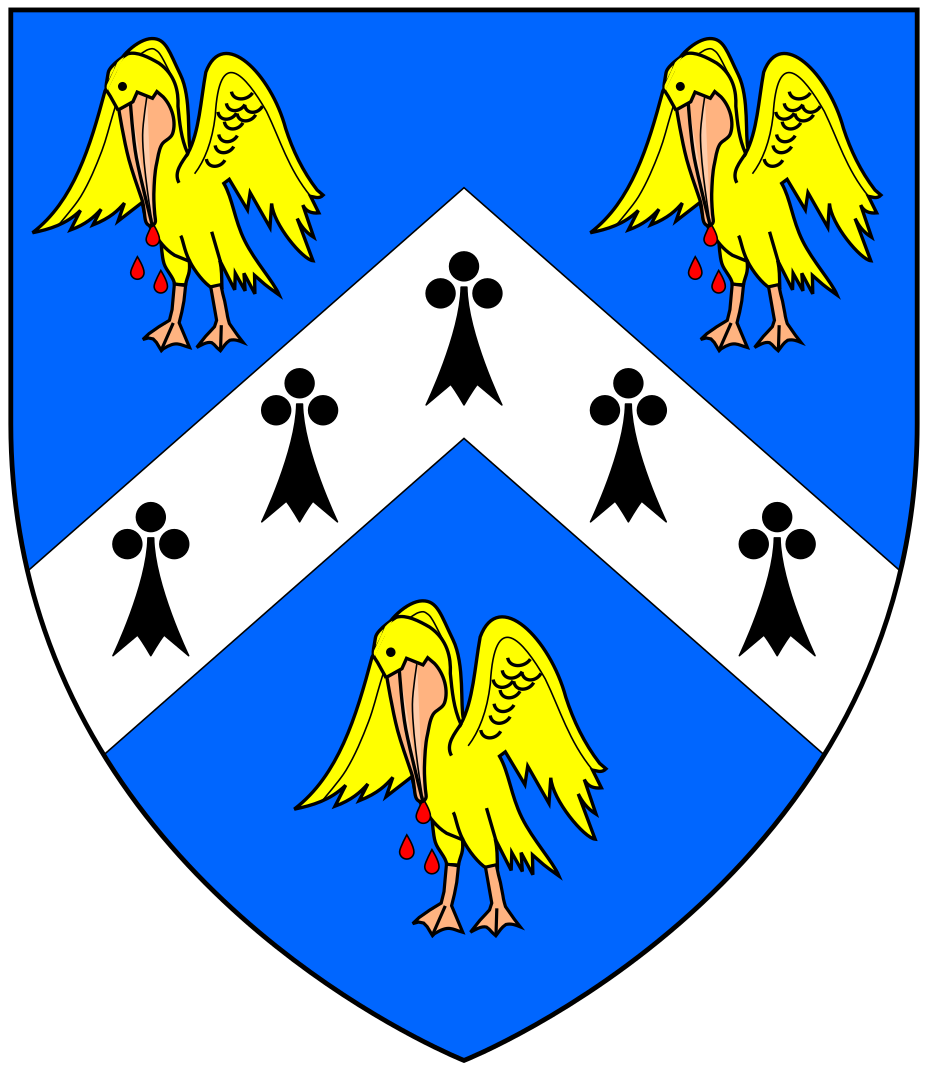
Arms of Culme: Azure, a chevron ermine between 3 pelicans vulning their breasts or

Benjamin Culme (1581–1657), Doctor of Divinity, was an English Anglican clergyman who served as Dean of St Patrick's Cathedral, Dublin, Ireland, from 1625 until 1649.

== Origins ==
He was born at Canonsleigh Abbey in the parish of Burlescombe, in Devon, a younger son of Hugh III Culme (c. 1543–1618), of Molland-Champson, of Weycroft, Axminster and of Canonsleigh, all in Devon, by his wife (whom he married in 1568 at Exeter) Mary Fortescue, a daughter of Richard Fortescue (c. 1517–1570) of Filleigh, Devon. His elder brother was Richard I Culme (c. 1571–1649) of Canonsleigh, a lawyer of the Inner Temple who served as Sheriff of Devon.

== Marriage and children ==
In 1637 in Ireland he married Deborah Pleydell (1623–1695) a daughter of Sir Charles (or Oliver) Pleydell (son of Gabriel Pleydell (fl. 1519 – c.1591), MP) by his second wife Jane St. John, a daughter of Sir John St. John, four-times a Member of Parliament for Bedfordshire, of Lydiard St John's (now Lydiard Tregoze), Wiltshire. By his wife he had two surviving children:

- Benjamin Culme (1638–1663);
- Elizabeth Culme (1645/50-1715), second wife of Sir John Morton, 2nd Baronet (c. 1627–1699) of Milbourne St Andrew in Dorset.

== Career ==
He attended St Alban's Hall, Oxford, where he obtained a BA degree in 1602, then Lincoln College, Oxford where he received a M.A. on 24 April 1605. He served as Rector of Trim from 1619, and in 1615 was appointed a Prebendary of Malahidert (in St. Patrick's), in 1624 as Precentor of Kilkenny and in 1624 Rector of Rathmore in the diocese of Meath. He was appointed Dean of St Patrick's Cathedral, Dublin, Ireland, which post he held from 1625 until 1649. He fled Ireland due to the Irish Rebellion of 1641 and settled at his wife's paternal estate of Midg Hall (or Mudghill) in the parish of Lydiard St John's in Wiltshire.

== Death ==
He died at Lydiard St John's, Wiltshire, on 21 October 1657 aged 76.
