= Edward Bassenet =

Welsh Anglican Dean

Edward Bassenet D.D. was a Welsh Anglican Dean.

Culme was born in Wales and appointed a Privy Counsellor by Henry VIII. He was Dean of St. Patrick's Cathedral Dublin from 1537 until 1547. He died before the restoration of the cathedral.
