= Walton Empey =

Irish Anglican Archbishop of Dublin

The Right Reverend Walton Empey
- Archbishop of Dublin; Primate of Ireland
- Church: Church of Ireland
- Diocese: Dublin and Glendalough
- Elected: 1996
- In office: 1996–2002
- Predecessor: Donald Caird
- Successor: John Neill
- Previous posts: Bishop of Limerick and Killaloe (1981–1985); Diocese of Meath and Kildare (1985–1996)

Orders
- Ordination: by 1959
- Consecration: 25 March 1981 by Henry McAdoo

Personal details
- Born: 26 October 1934 (age 91) Dublin, County Dublin, Irish Free State
- Denomination: Anglican
- Spouse: Louisa Hall
- Children: 4

The Most Rev. Walton Newcombe Francis Empey (born 26 October 1934) is a retired Church of Ireland bishop. He was formerly the Archbishop of Dublin.

Empey was born in Dublin, the son of the Reverend Francis Fullerton Empey and Mildred May "Mimi" Empey (née Cox). His father was also a cleric, serving in Donoughmore and Donard, Fenagh and then in Enniscorthy. Empey was educated in local national schools in his father's parishes and then at Portora Royal School in Enniskillen. He then took a BA at Trinity College, Dublin in 1957.

Empey was ordained as a deacon in 1958 and, after being ordained priest in 1959, he was appointed as a curate in St Paul's church, in Glenageary, County Dublin. The following year he moved to Canada, serving the Anglican Church in Canada initially in Grand Falls, New Brunswick and then for three years as Rector of Madawaska.

Empey returned to Ireland in 1966 as Rector of Stradbally, County Laois, until 1971, when he was appointed as Dean of Limerick and Rector of Limerick City Parishes. In 1981 he was elected Bishop of Limerick and Killaloe and in 1985 he succeeded Donald Caird as Bishop of Meath and Kildare. Caird had been appointed as Archbishop of Dublin and when he retired from that role in 1996, Empey was elected as his successor, becoming Archbishop of Dublin, Bishop of Glendalough, Primate of Ireland and Metropolitan. He was enthroned in Christ Church Cathedral in June 1997 and retired in 2002.

Archbishop Empey married Louisa "Louie" Hall in July 1960 and they have four children; Patrick (born 1961), Karl (born 1963), Kevin (born 1967) and Sheila (born 1971). He also has ten grandchildren, the youngest born on 20 April 2013.

Church of Ireland titles
Preceded by Edwin Owen	Bishop of Limerick and Killaloe; 1981–1985	Succeeded by Edward Flewett Darling
Preceded by Donald Caird	Bishop of Meath and Kildare; 1985–1996	Succeeded by Richard Clarke
Preceded by Donald Caird	Archbishop of Dublin; 1996–2002	Succeeded by John Neill
