= Diocese of Kildare =

The Diocese of Kildare can refer to:

- The Roman Catholic diocese of Kildare which is incorporated into the Roman Catholic Diocese of Kildare and Leighlin
- The Church of Ireland diocese of Kildare which is incorporated into the Diocese of Meath and Kildare

== See also ==
- Bishop of Kildare
