= Sheep Gate =

Town gate in Trim, Ireland

- Geata an Chaora
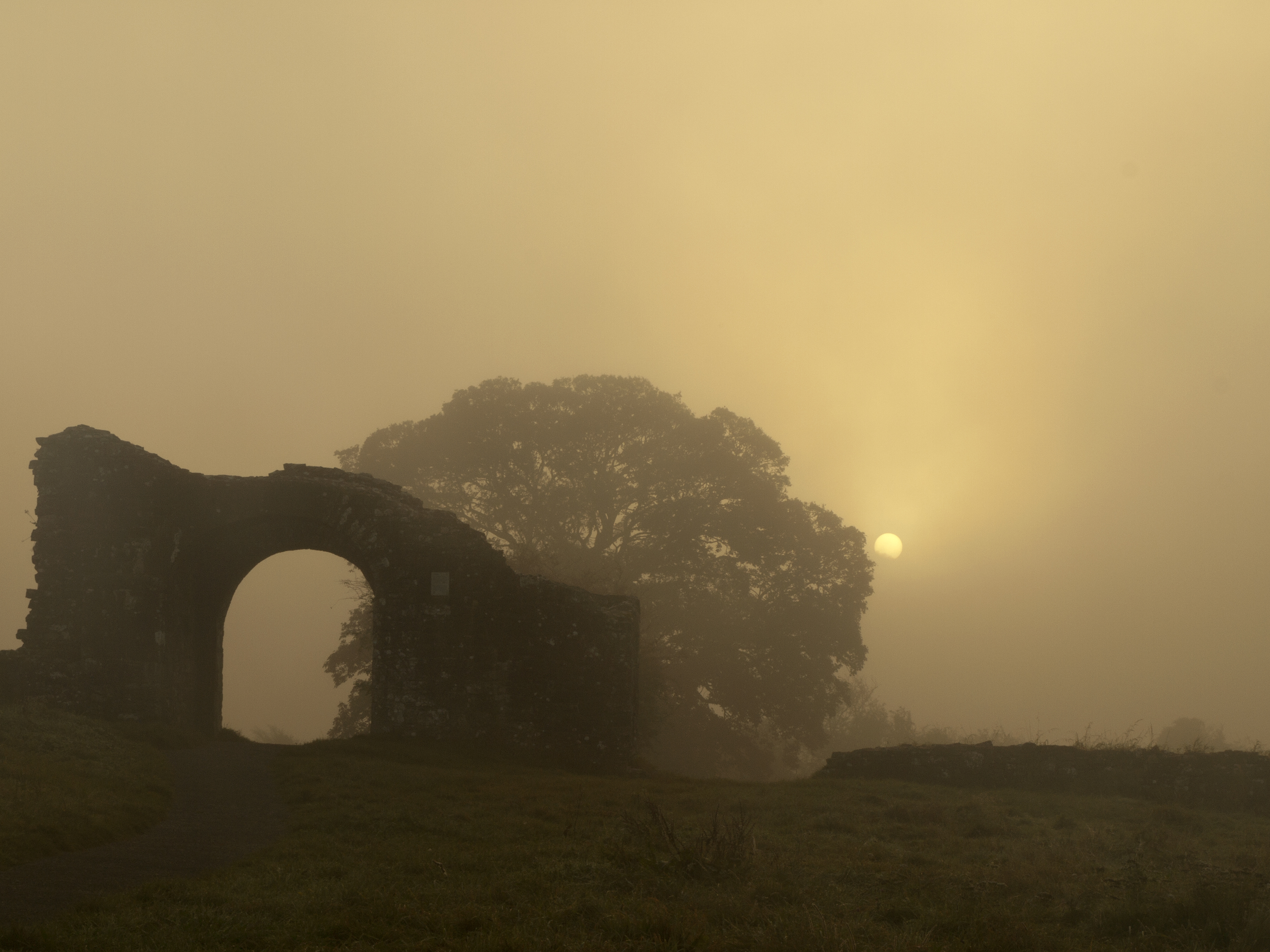

- Location within Ireland

General information
- Type: town gate
- Location: Trim, County Meath, Ireland
- Coordinates: 53.555281°N 6.787875°W
- Completed: 13th/14th century AD

Technical details
- Material: limestone, mortar

Design and construction
Designations
Designations
National monument of Ireland
- Official name: Sheep Gate
- Reference no.: 469

The Sheep Gate is a town gate in Trim, Ireland. It is a National Monument.

== History ==
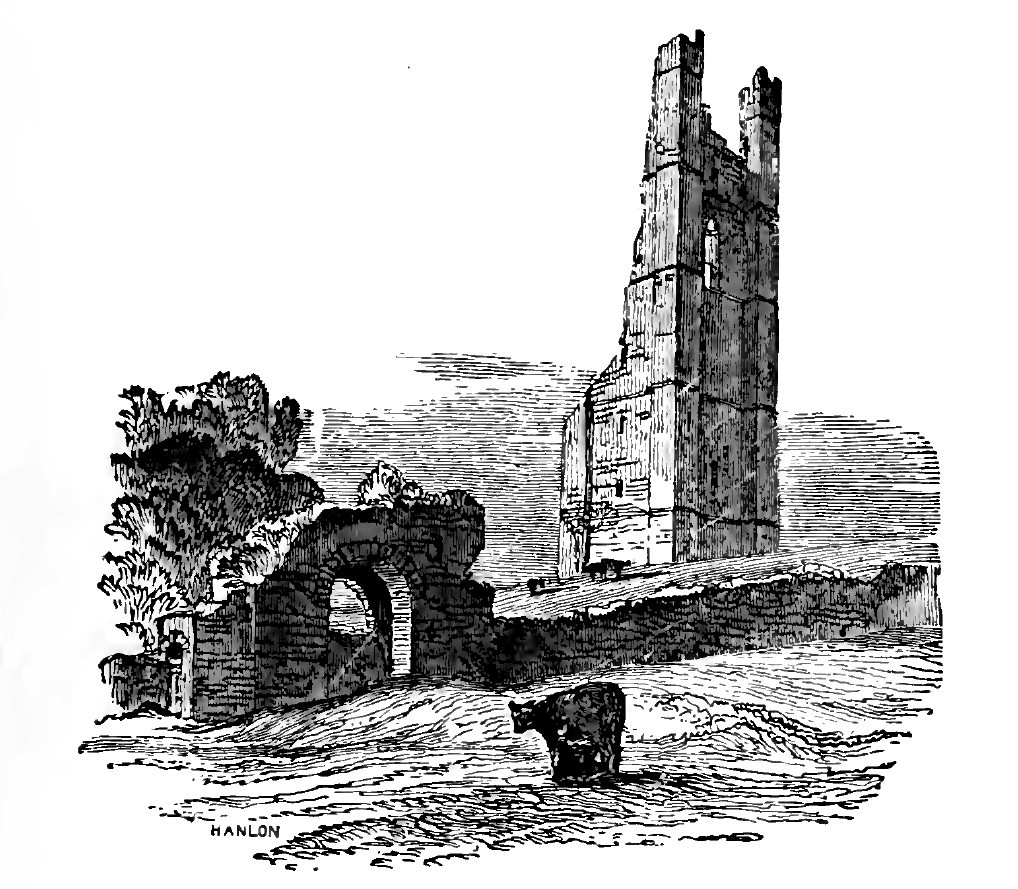
Illustration from Wakeman's handbook of Irish antiquities (1903), showing Sheep Gate and Yellow Steeple.

The Sheep Gate is the only surviving gate of five that once provided access to Trim. The town wall and its gates were built in the 13th or 14th century. Sheep Gate may have been so named as a toll was charged here for sheep being brought in to be sold at market: in 1290, the murage and pavage tax was one penny per ten sheep, reduced to a farthing in 1308. The name could also derive from the archaic meaning of cheap, meaning "market" (cf. Cheapside). This name is not recorded before the 19th century; it may have been known as the Porch Gate, possibly from French porte ("door"), which may also give its name to the Porch Fields lying outside the city walls. The gate was locked between 9 p.m. and 4 a.m.

== The gate ==
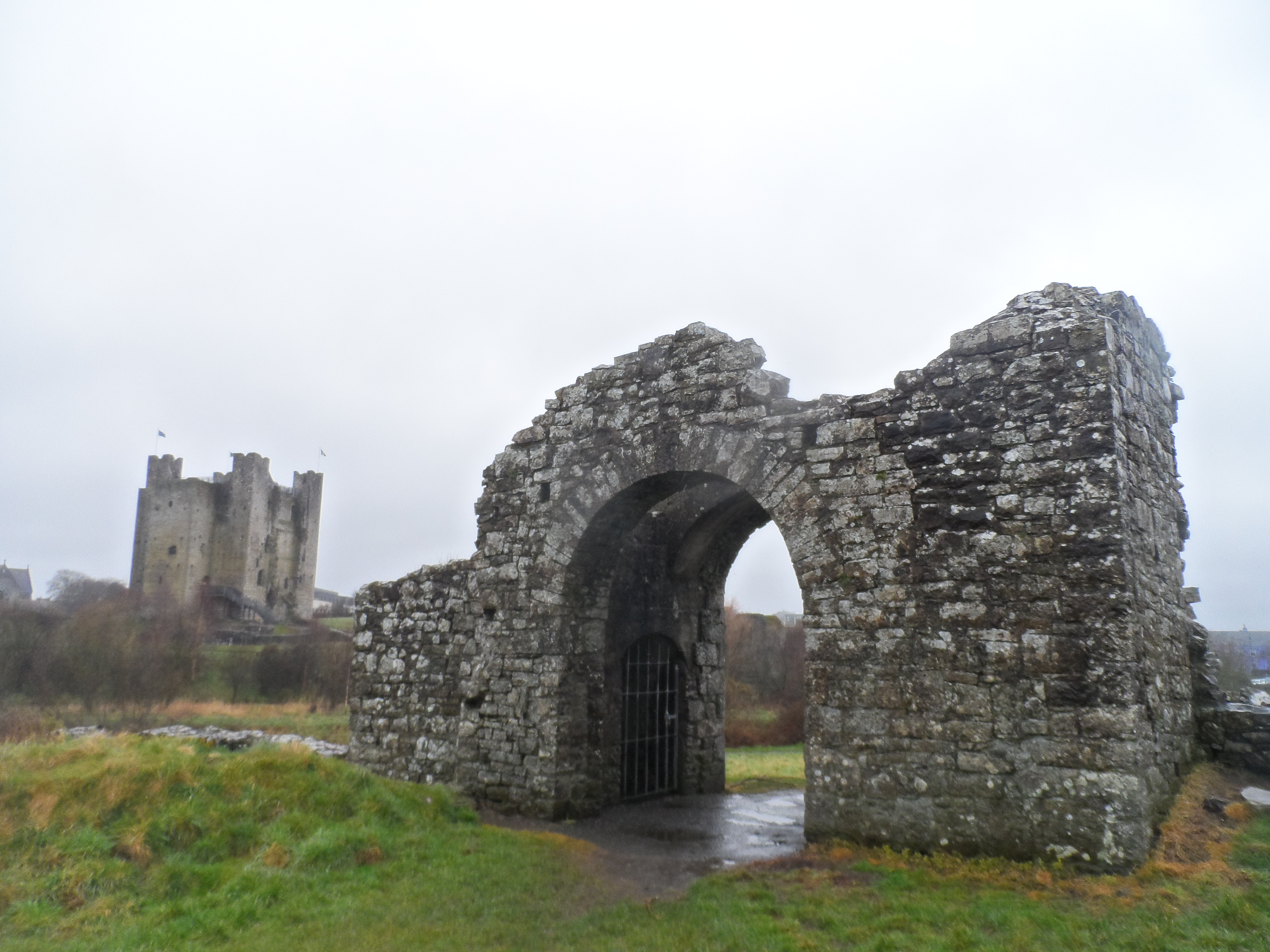
Sheep Gate with Trim Castle behind.

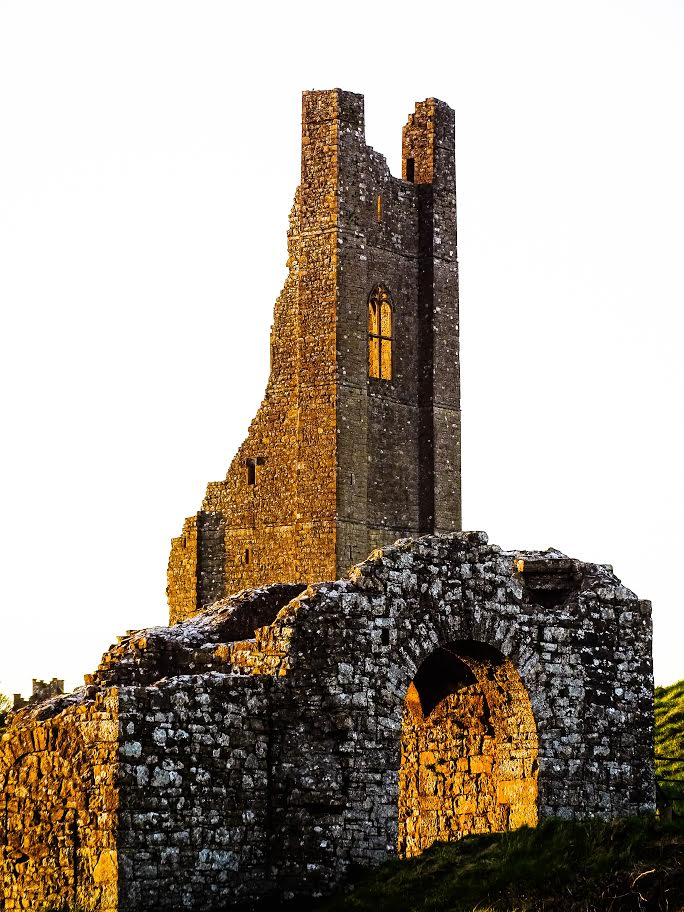
Sheep Gate with Yellow Steeple behind.

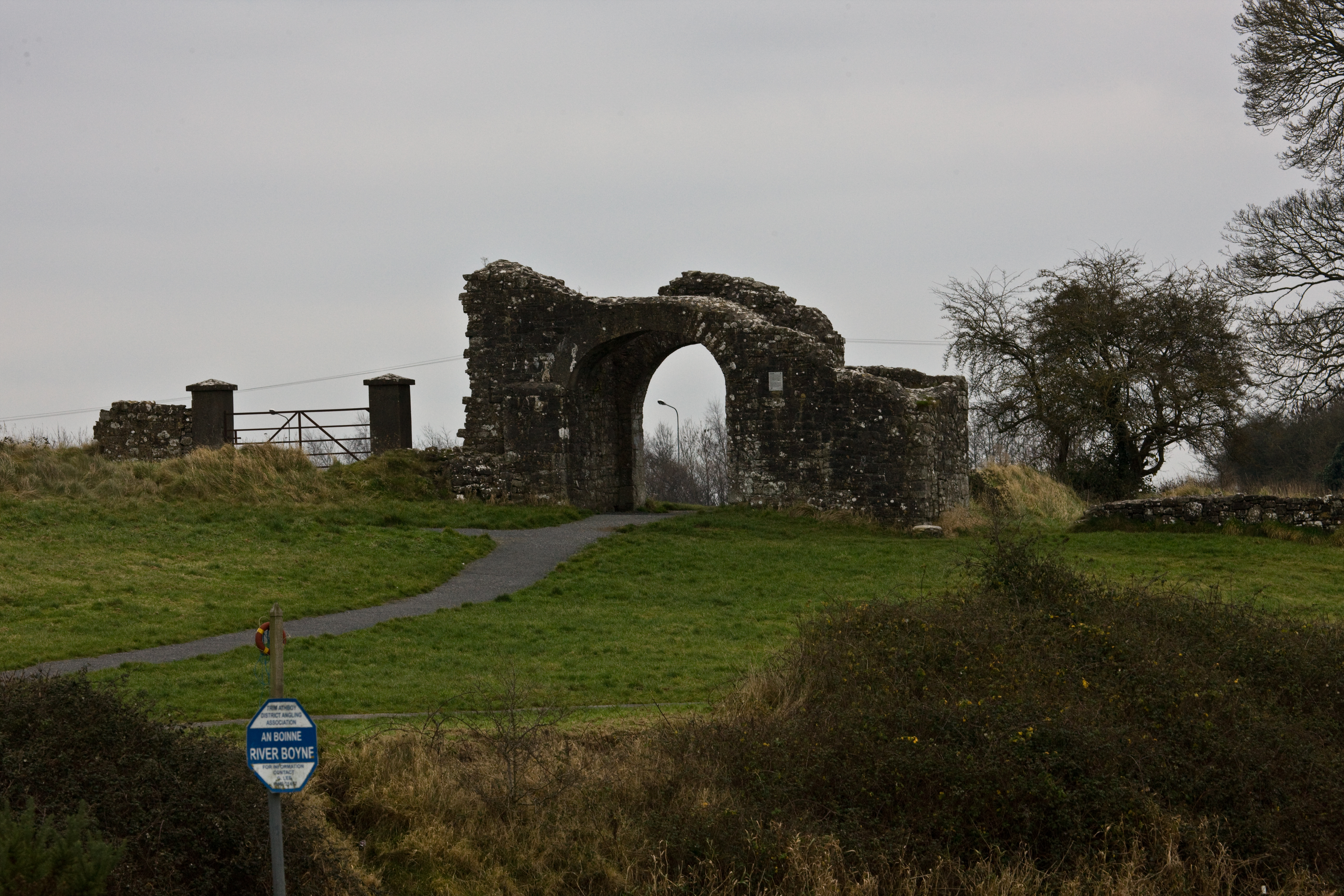
View of Sheep Gate, with Boyne in foreground.

The gate was the southeastern entrance to the town, and is located just north of the River Boyne. Sheep Gate survives as a stone archway.
