= Trim, County Meath =

Town in County Meath, Ireland

Trim Baile Átha Troim (Irish)
- Town
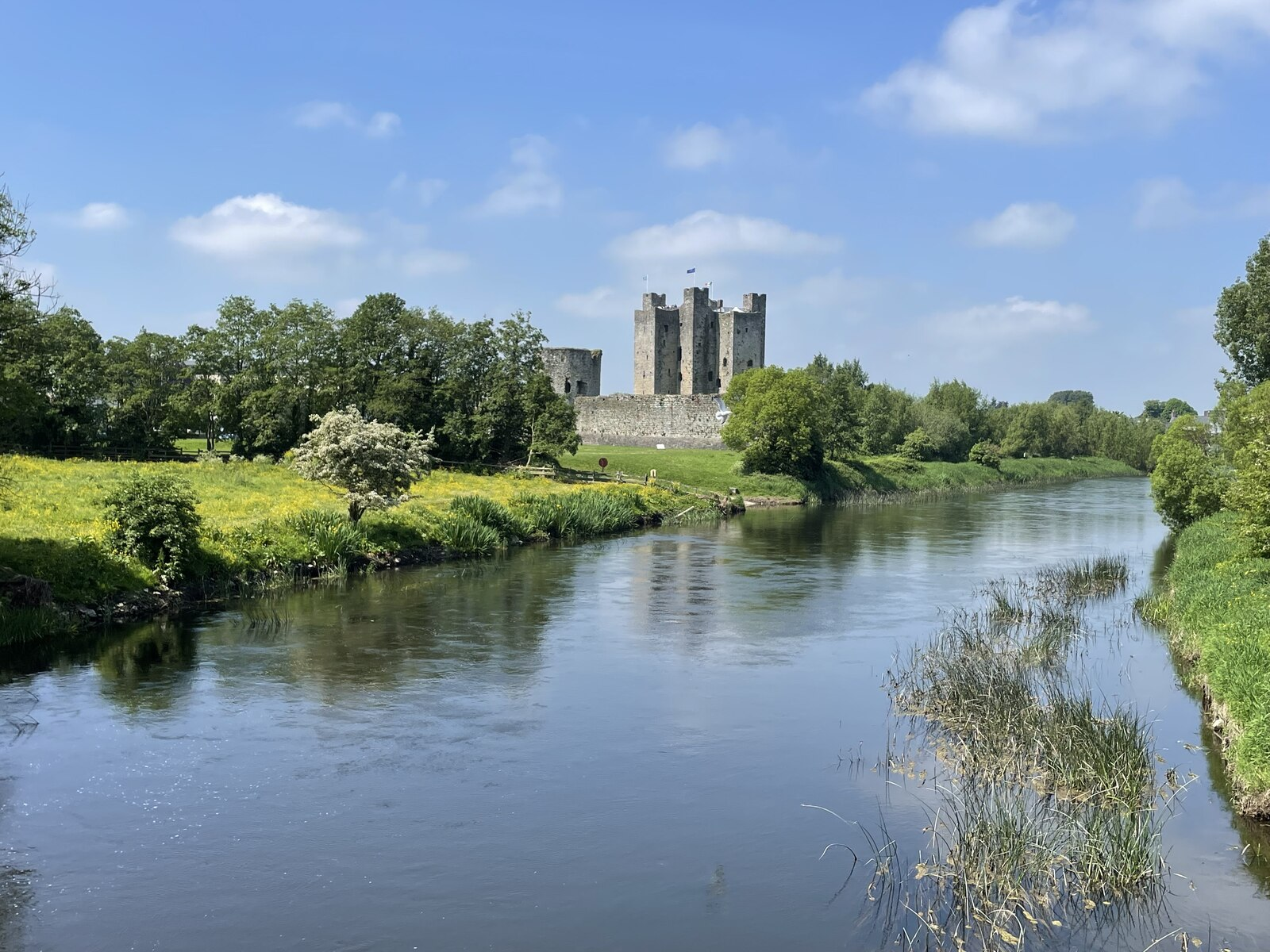
- Trim Castle and the River Boyne, Trim

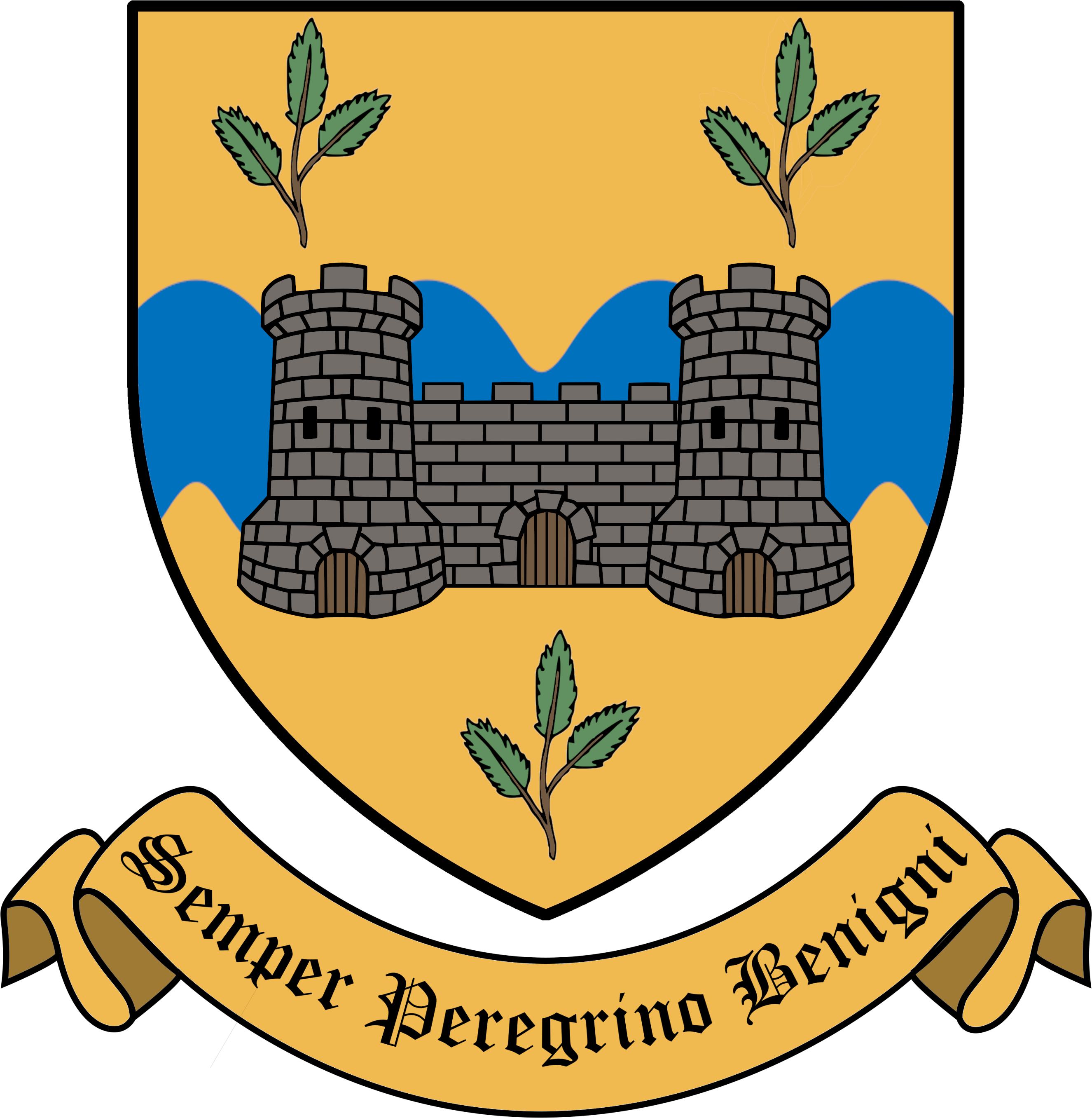
- Coat of arms
- Motto: Latin: Semper peregrino benigni "Always welcome the stranger"
- Location in Ireland
- Coordinates: 53.553°N 6.793°W
- Country: Ireland
- Province: Leinster
- County: County Meath
- Elevation: 61 m (200 ft)

Population (2022)
  - Total: 9,563
- Time zone: UTC±0 (WET)
  - Summer (DST): UTC+1 (IST)
- Eircode routing key: C15
- Telephone area code: +353(0)46
- Irish Grid Reference: N800567

Historical population
| Year | Pop. | ±% |
|---|---|---|
| 1813 | 1,754 | — |
| 1821 | 2,304 | +31.4% |
| 1831 | 3,282 | +42.4% |
| 1841 | 2,269 | −30.9% |
| 1851 | 1,905 | −16.0% |
| 1861 | 2,058 | +8.0% |
| 1871 | 2,195 | +6.7% |
| 1881 | 1,586 | −27.7% |
| 1891 | 1,531 | −3.5% |
| 1901 | 1,513 | −1.2% |
| 1911 | 1,488 | −1.7% |
| 1926 | 1,325 | −11.0% |
| 1936 | 1,455 | +9.8% |
| 1946 | 1,383 | −4.9% |
| 1951 | 1,309 | −5.4% |
| 1956 | 1,786 | +36.4% |
| 1961 | 1,745 | −2.3% |
| 1966 | 1,856 | +6.4% |
| 1971 | 2,255 | +21.5% |
| 1981 | 3,526 | +56.4% |
| 1986 | 4,124 | +17.0% |
| 1991 | 4,185 | +1.5% |
| 1996 | 4,405 | +5.3% |
| 2002 | 5,894 | +33.8% |
| 2006 | 6,870 | +16.6% |
| 2011 | 8,268 | +20.3% |
| 2016 | 9,194 | +11.2% |
| 2022 | 9,563 | +4.0% |

Trim (Note: Irish: Baile Átha Troim, meaning 'town of the ford of the elder trees') is a town in County Meath, Ireland. It is situated on the River Boyne and, as of the 2022 census, had a population of 9,563. The town is in a civil parish of the same name.

The town is noted for Trim Castle – the largest Norman castle in Ireland. One of the two cathedrals of the Church of Ireland United Dioceses of Meath and Kildare – St Patrick's cathedral – is located north of the river. Trim won the Irish Tidy Towns Competition in 1972, 1984, 2014 and 2022, and was the joint winner with Ballyconnell in 1974. Trim was historically the county town of Meath, but this title was passed on in 1898 to the larger, neighbouring town of Navan.

== Etymology ==
Trim first appears in the historical record as Áth Truimm in an account of the foundation of a church there in 432 by St. Lommán, the town's patron saint, contained in the Book of Armagh.

Situated on the River Boyne, Trim gets its name from the Irish Átha Troim meaning 'the ford of the elder trees', indicating that this was an important fording point on the river. It is thought that the Watergate Street crossing is the original ford point.

The Modern Irish name for the town is Baile Átha Troim.

== History ==
=== Early history ===
At an early date, a monastery was founded at Trim, which lay within the petty kingdom (tuath) of the Cenél Lóegairi. It is traditionally thought to have been founded by St. Patrick and left in the care of its patron saint Lommán, also locally known as Loman, who flourished sometime between the 5th and early 6th centuries. When domestic politics endangered the position of Lommán's foundation, the church of Armagh assimilated Lommán into the dossier of St. Patrick, making him a disciple of that saint. Attackers burned the church several times in the twelfth century. The English first captured the town during the Norman invasion of Ireland, and a castle was built. However, the town was recaptured and the castle burned by a massive Irish army under the command of Ruadhrí Ua Conchobair, King of Ireland. Later, it was refounded as an St. Mary's Abbey under Augustinian rule. The abbey church was the sanctuary for "Our Lady of Trim", a wooden statue reported to work miracles. The statue made Trim a major pilgrimage site from at least 1397. During the Reformation the statue was burned and Henry VIII dissolved the abbey. The abbey's bell tower, the "Yellow Steeple", is the primary remnant of St. Mary's.

With the spelling "Áth Truim", the bishopric is today listed by the Catholic Church as a titular see. Since it is not mentioned in either of the lists of the reduced number of sees approved by the Synod of Ráth Breasail (1111) and the Synod of Kells (1152), it was one of the monastic establishments that were no longer recognized as seats of bishops after the 12th-century reorganization of the Church in Ireland. Its territory was joined to that of Meath Diocese.

=== Norman period ===
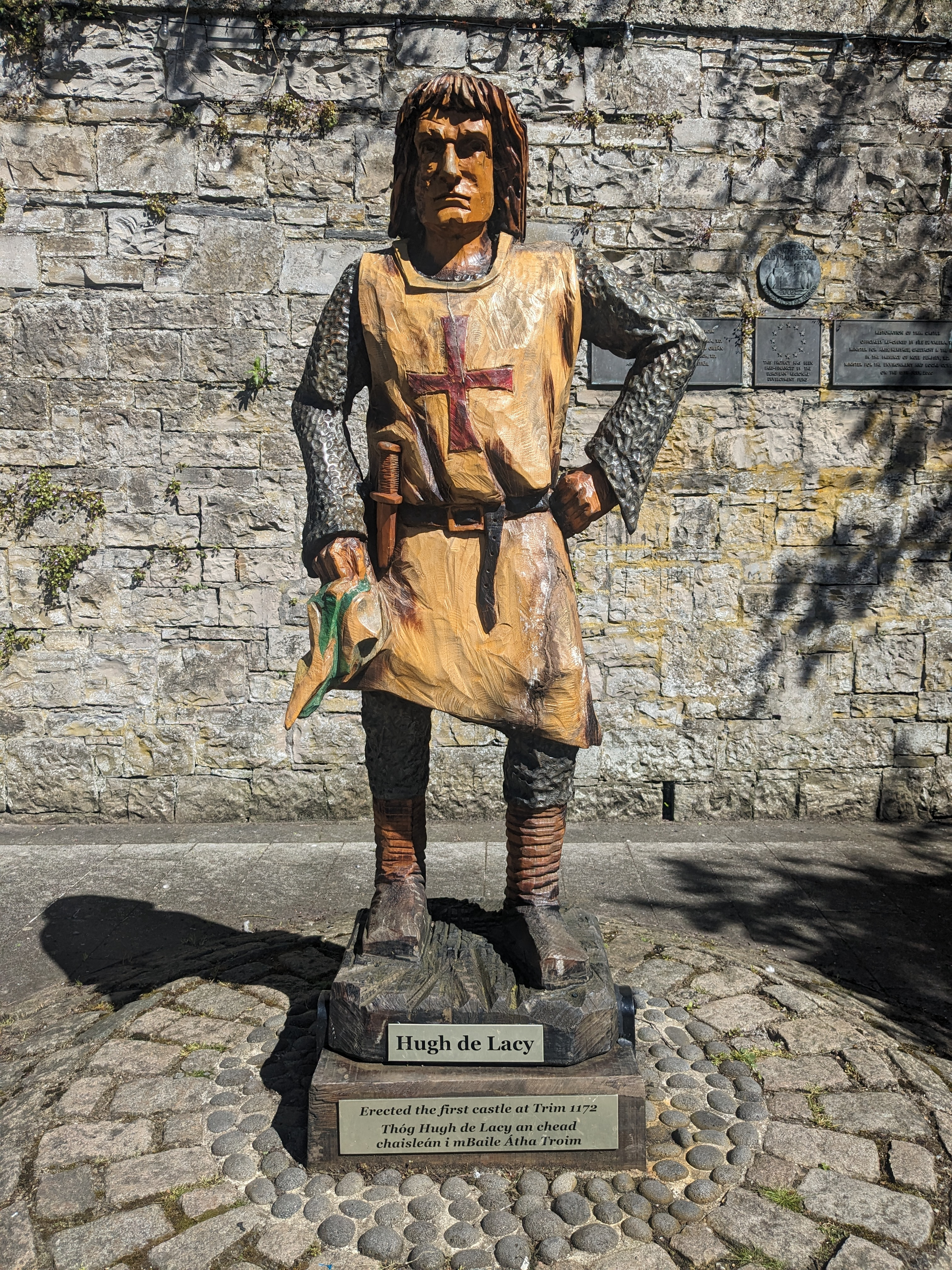
A statue of Hugh de Lacy, Lord of Meath

Lying 61 m above sea level on the River Boyne, Trim became one of the most important Hiberno-Norman settlements in the Middle Ages. In the 15th century, the Norman-Irish parliament met in Trim. Arthur Wellesley, 1st Duke of Wellington is reputed to have been born in Dangan Castle between Trim and Summerhill, and a large column to him was erected in the town in 1817. The town's main feature is Ireland's largest Norman castle, Trim Castle; other features include two ruined church complexes, the Boyne River for fishing, and the Butterstream Gardens, visited by Charles, Prince of Wales in the mid-nineties (no longer open to the public).

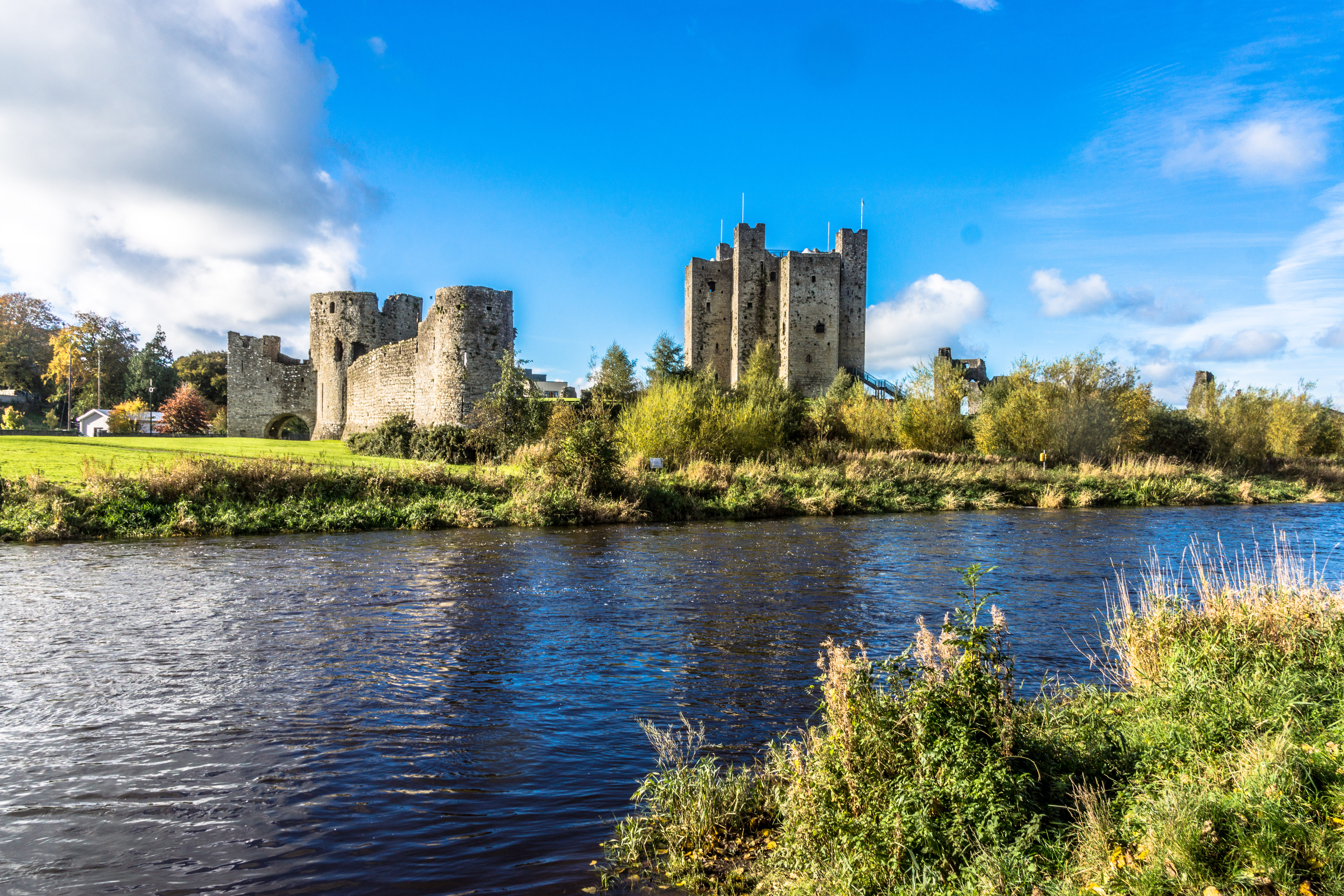
Trim Castle built by Hugh de Lacy

Trim Castle (or King John's Castle) is Ireland's largest Norman castle. It was built in the late 12th century following the Norman invasion of Ireland. Trim and the surrounding lands were granted to Hugh de Lacy, Lord of Meath, a Norman baron. Richard II of England stayed there before being ousted from power. Once a candidate to be the country's capital, the town has also occupied a role as one of the outposts of the Pale, and sessions of the Irish Parliament were sometimes held here, as in 1542. It was also designated by Elizabeth I of England as the planned location for a Protestant Dublin University (known as Trinity College Dublin). However this was revised by Sir Francis Drake, who advocated the case for locating the university in Dublin.

=== Later history ===
In 1649, after the sacking of Drogheda, the garrison of Trim fled to join other Irish forces and the town was occupied by the army of Oliver Cromwell.

There were many local disturbances in neighbouring villages in the Irish Rebellion of 1798, most infamously the battle on the Hill of Tara, following the dispersal of the Wexford rebellion. Trim was represented by Arthur Wellesley in the Irish Parliament from 1790 to 1797.

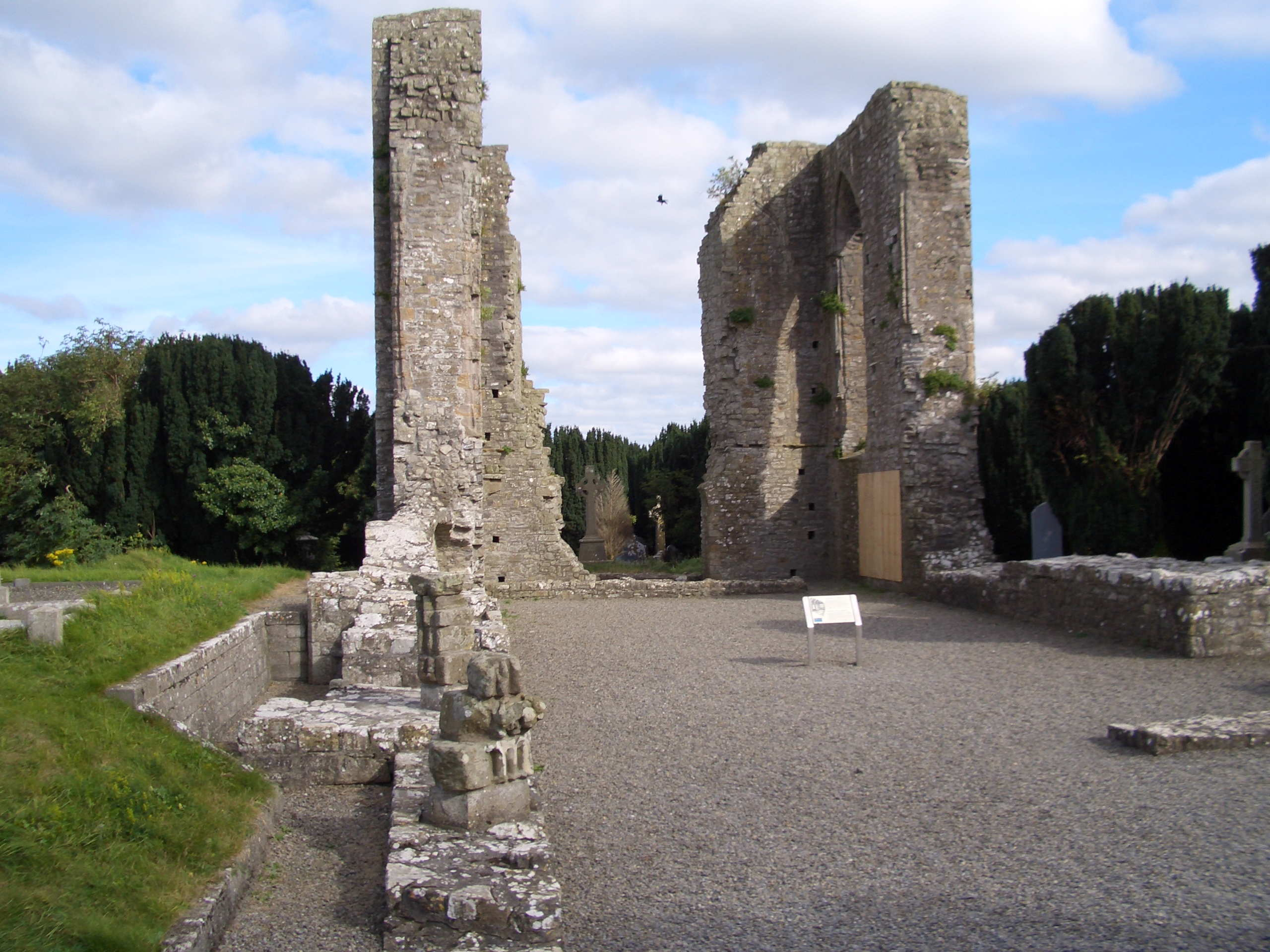
Newtown Abbey

The 19th century saw the construction of Trim Courthouse, St. Loman's Catholic church, St. Patrick's Anglican church, the Wellington column, the current Bank of Ireland building, and Castle Street by Lord Dunsany, a major landowner. Following the Great Irish Famine of 1846–1849, the practices of agriculture in the hinterland altered, with a change in emphasis from tillage to stock raising. This resulted in a change in the business life of Trim. Trim developed as a market town for the productive agricultural hinterland. Some small-scale local industries were developed, including envelope, and leather product manufacturing. Trim was also chosen as a location for the Timoney Engineering company to make Fire Tenders. However, in the main, the town continued to mainly be a service centre for its immediate area.

=== 20th century and contemporary ===
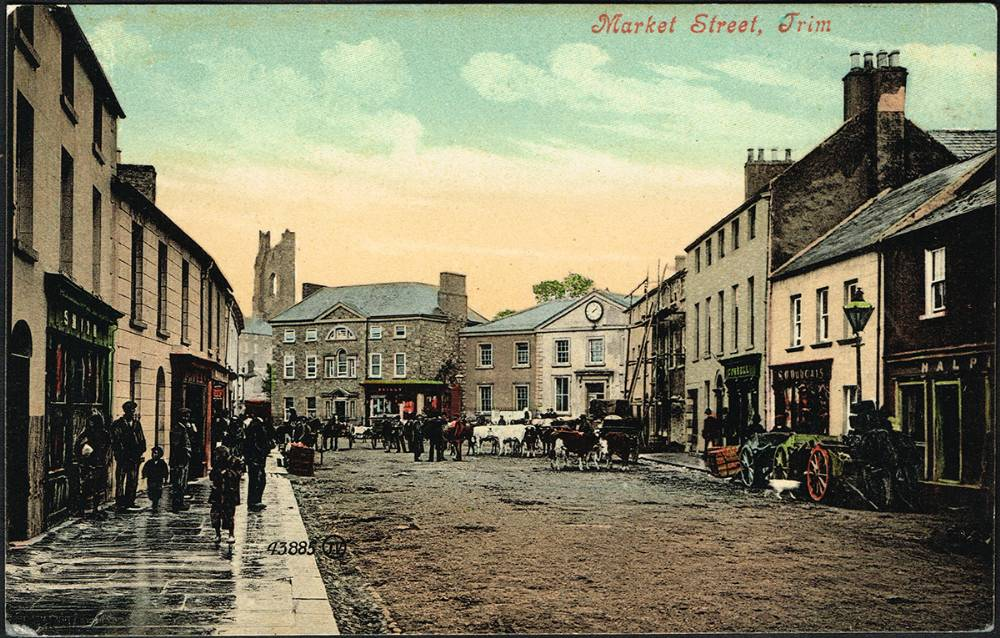
A colourised Valentine postcard depicting Market Street, registered 1904

During the Irish War of Independence, local companies of the Irish Republican Army (IRA) took Trim RIC Barracks, a large structure located on the current site of the Castle Arch Hotel, secured the arms from the barracks and then burnt down the Barracks. A large part of the town was burned as a reprisal by the British Crown forces on 26 September 1920. The local members were drawn from Trim, Longwood, Ballivor and South Meath in general. The Lalor brothers from Castle St. were prominent members of the IRA as well as the Duignans from High St and the Proctors. Records of the adventures of the Lalors rest in Navan library and recount the tales of one of the brothers hiding in the recently dug grave of Fr. Woods in the churchyard. Local memories recall the townspeople sheltering down by the Boyne for a few nights as the Black and Tans and the Auxiliaries burnt out several businesses and the town hall. Footage of the burning of J&E Smyth can be viewed on the 'Pathe' website. The newspapers reported the burning of the barracks and the subsequent looting and burning of the town and follow-up operations by the local IRA.

In later years, the Lalors who moved to the house across the road from the old Brothers school had a collection of memorabilia from those years including letters from Michael Collins sent from Frongoch (they kept the originals and forward duplicates to HQ), Éamon de Valera's slippers and a Tricolour made by Constance Markievicz (with her name embroidered) that was to fly over the GPO during the 1916 Easter Rising. Their whereabouts now are unknown but photographs of their existence are on file in Navan library.

A new bridge was built on the Boyne in the 1980s to divert heavy traffic from the town. This was then enhanced by the construction, in stages, of an inner relief road, which now makes it possible for heavy traffic to achieve a complete by-pass of the town. The Watergate Bridge was replaced in 2005.

As part of the Civil Service decentralisation plan of the Irish government, Trim was chosen as the location of the headquarters for the state body known as the Office of Public Works. The movement of this state administration function to Trim resulted in Trim being the first location outside of Dublin to complete a decentralisation move.

== Places of interest ==
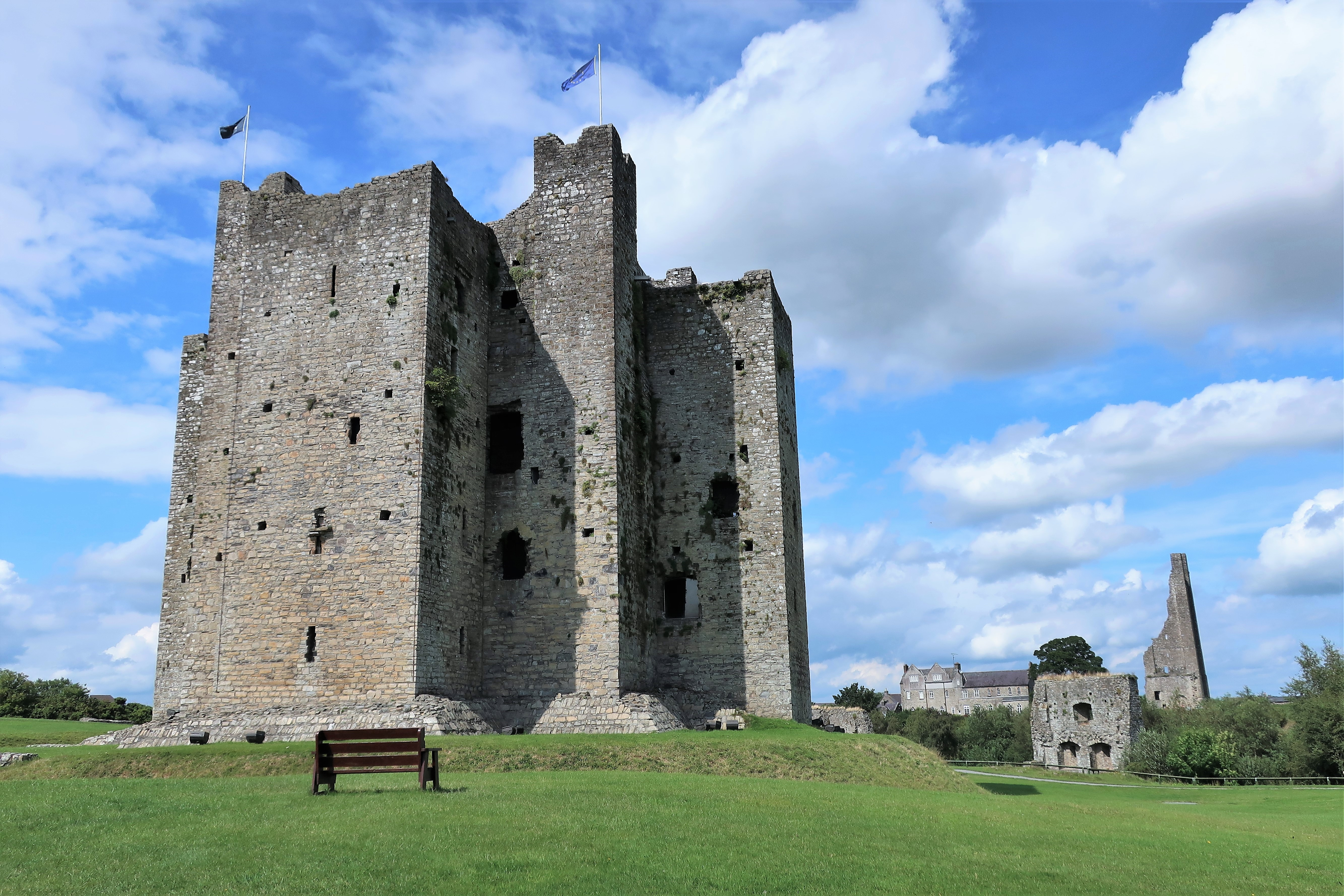
The keep of Trim Castle; the Yellow Steeple is also visible in the right background

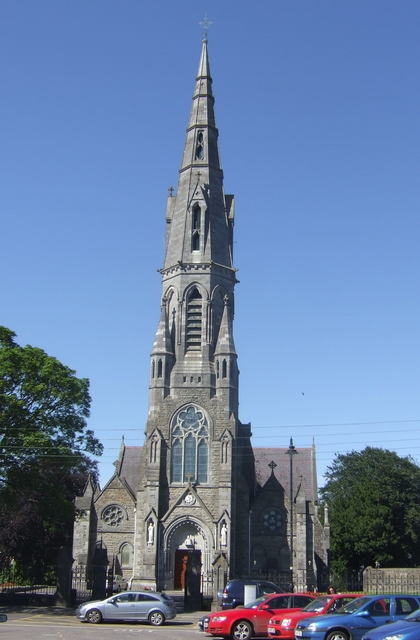
St Patrick's Church (Catholic)

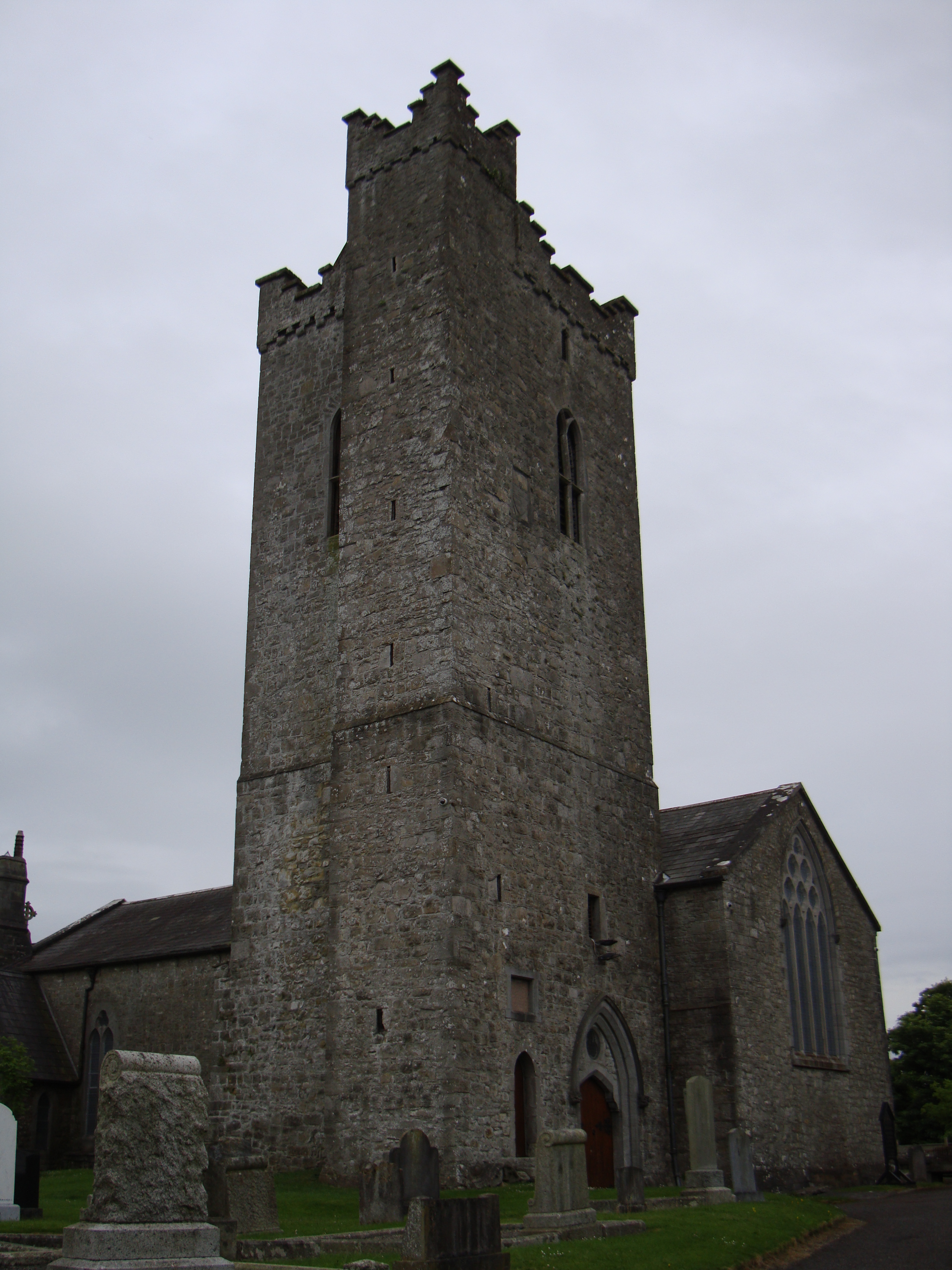
St Patrick's Cathedral (Anglican)

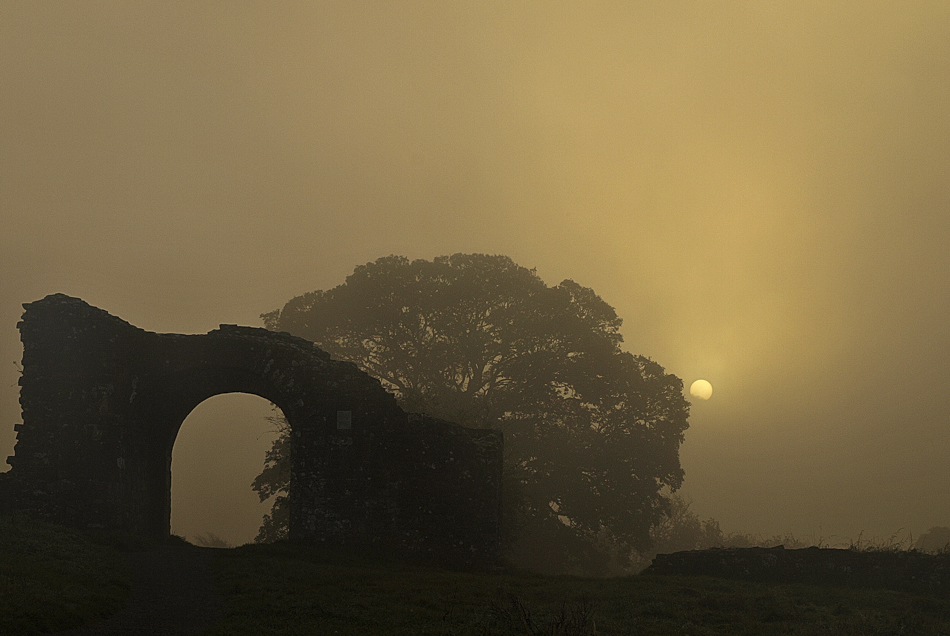
Sheep's gate in the morning

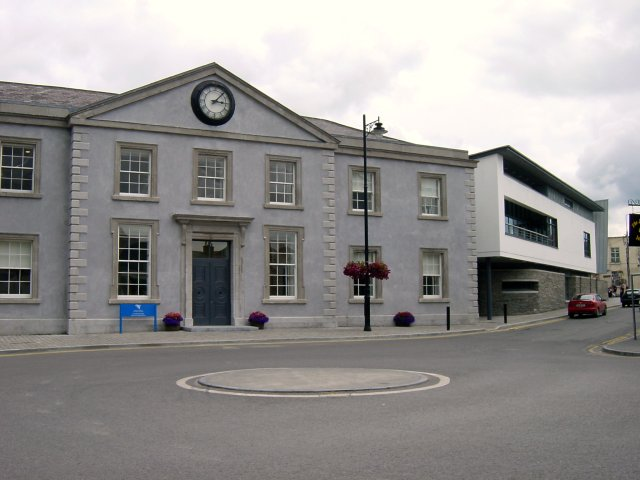
Trim courthouse

- Trim Castle, the largest Cambro-Norman castle in Ireland which was built by Hugh de Lacy, Lord of Meath. It was used in the production of the film Braveheart and the 1980 film The Big Red One, starring Lee Marvin and Mark Hamill, was also partially shot in Trim and in particular at Trim Castle.
- St Patrick's church (Roman Catholic), Church Street
- St. Patrick's Cathedral Church (Church of Ireland), Loman Street. It is reputed to be the oldest Anglican Church in Ireland (disputed by a church in Armagh which claims its 20 years older than the Trim Church). The original church lies in ruins behind the current newer church which faces onto Loman Street from behind a large boundary wall.
- The Town Hall, known locally as the Market House, is reputed to have been one of Thin Lizzy's first concert venues, and has seen U2 and several other noted bands play there over the years.
- The Yellow Steeple (named so for the way the sun sets and rises on it in the giving it a yellow colour), the remains of a 14th-century St. Mary's Abbey on a hillside near the town centre, is the tallest building in Trim and can be seen for kilometres around the town.
- The Town Walls – Though not much remains of the original walls of Trim, the "Sheep Gate" stands near the 'yellow steeple' and the castle. The wall in this area is in ruins but it marks the original town boundary, the only intact part of the wall stands on Loman Street It is not marked by any signs but it starts around the front of St. Patrick's Anglican church and runs down to the local Costa Coffee (previously The Priory Inn).
- The Black Friary – A 13th century Dominican friary located just outside the town walls. The excavation of the remains of the friary is part of the Blackfriary community archaeology project.
- The Boyne river walk is a walkway along the river Boyne starting at the castle park and running along the Boyne to Newtown abbey. The total walk to Newtown and back takes about 40 minutes.
- Newtown Abbey lies on the banks of the Boyne about 15 minutes' walk from Trim Castle. It once was the largest abbey of its kind in Ireland. It is still used as a graveyard for the town so there are no guided tours but there are many information boards with pictures of what certain areas used to look like.
- St. John's Priory, a medieval hospital, lies across the Boyne from Newtown abbey. This structure is again free access. At the entrance there is a defence tower which used to form part of the walls of the hospital.
- Trim Circuit Courthouse – Built in the 19th century, the courthouse overlooks the main street of the town and is located next to the main entrance of the castle. It has been extended with an award-winning design.
- Wellington Monument – The Duke of Wellington was born in Ireland and spent some of his childhood near Trim. It takes the form of a column surmounted by a statue of the Duke, and was erected in 1817.

== Events ==
=== Trim Vintage and Veteran Car Show ===
An annual classic car show takes place in Trim every July, Trim Veteran and Vintage Rally has been running since 1985. It started in a small yard on Loman Street with just 1 car. The founder, Norman Pratt, along with his hand-picked committee, were determined to expand the show, approached the Roundtree family who allowed the Porch Fields to be used on the day. The committee included secretary Ms. Iris Wilson, PRO Frank Dempsey, Billy Wilson, and George Douglas. It has grown each year since then and there are now in excess of 500 cars and motorcycles on show. Visitors to the show can also try their hand at archery with Athboy Archery Club. The archery has always been a big success at the fair.

=== Trim Haymaking Festival ===
Trim Haymaking Festival, run by Scurlogstown Olympiad CLG, is held in the town on the third Sunday of June. The Porchfields, an amenity space rich in historic value, are home to a fair, market, and cultural displays. The main event is the traditional making of the first hay of the year by hand and by old-style machinery. Visitors to the show can also see a replica village, Blacksmith, Tinsmith and take part in the ever popular Father's Day competition. Hudson's Fun Fair and the music is also a huge attraction. All monies collected on the day, excepting costs, goes to local charities in October/November every year.

=== Trim Swift Festival ===
Because of Jonathan Swift's residence near Trim after 1700, a satirical festival is held in his honour.

=== Trim Poetry Festival ===
Trim Poetry Festival began in March 2019 and was organised by Boyne Writers' Group. During the festival Boyne Berries, a journal of poetry and short fiction, was published on the occasion of its 25th issue. The winner of Trim Poetry Competition 2019 was also announced. The Festival will return again in March 2020 and is being organised by a festival committee of Boyne Writers' Group members including Michael Farry, Orla Fay, Frances Browne, Barbara Flood, Anne Crinion, Tom Dredge and Sinéad MacDevitt.

=== Royal Meath Show ===
The Royal Meath Show takes place annually in Porchfield on the first Sunday in September each year. 1929 was the first show. The main events of this agricultural show are judging cattle, sheep, goats, horses, dogs and home industries. The Artisan Area includes a cookery demonstration by a celebrity Chef, an Artisan Food Area, and an Artisan Craft Area. The Meath Environmental Network have talks on many environmental issues. The Heritage Demo Area includes wool weaving, hand shearing, knitting, milking the cow, making butter, basket weaving and many more. The Royal Bee Association have their annual show, there is also a vintage display.

=== Púca Festival ===
Púca Festival is held over the Halloween season in Trim and Athboy, with tours to Hill of Ward (Tlachtga in Irish).

Halloween has its origin in the ancient Irish festival of Samhain, marking the end of the harvest and the beginning of Winter. According to Irish mythology, Samhain was a time when the 'doorways' to the Otherworld opened, allowing supernatural beings and the souls of the dead to come into our world and "was essentially a festival for the dead".

During medieval times, Tlachtga was the site of great festivals, including one at which winter fires or bone fires (Tine Cnámh) were lit at Samhain, It is associated with the figure Tlachtga, a druidess in Irish mythology who is said to have given birth to triplets on the hill.

From the website: "Púca celebrates Ireland as the birthplace of Halloween with an authentic, immersive, and otherworldly festival. Vibrant, fun, and contemporary in feel but strongly rooted in tradition, Working in partnership with Irish artists, seanchaí storytellers, and the local community the Púca Festival will showcase the best in contemporary Irish music, spectacle, and performance over four days and nights in Ireland’s Ancient East, breathing life into old traditions and forging new connections to our roots through performance, craft and culture. This immersive festival brings ancient traditions to life through music, fire, stories and mischief in the historic towns of Athboy and Trim, where Halloween began over 2,000 years ago."

Púca Festival includes a procession through Trim, styled in 2025 as 'The Gathering of the Spirits', and 'Lighting of the Samhain Fire' in Athboy.

== Media ==
The studios of Atlantic 252, a defunct longwave radio station, were situated in Trim during the 1990s. The station's former buildings are now home to Trim Town Council and Trim Area Committee, two of the administrative bodies within the County of Meath.

The RTÉ Radio 1 longwave transmitter at Clarkstown, some 11 km southeast of Trim, formerly broadcast the AM version of Radio 1 (sometimes known as RTÉ Europe) on 252 kHz (1190.4 m) until it was demolished in 2023. Before this date, RTÉ's main AM transmission centre had been near Athlone.

The 1980 movie The Big Red One, starring Lee Marvin and Mark Hamill, was also partially shot in Trim and in particular at Trim Castle.

The town has been used as the location for some film productions, including the use of Trim Castle to depict York Castle in Mel Gibson's Braveheart.

Trim was also the setting for the first full-length Irish martial arts movie Fatal Deviation.

== Sport ==
The town is home to Meath GAA footballers including Jack Quinn, Darren Fay and Brendan Murphy.

Trim GAA club has won the Meath Senior Football Championship on one occasion, in 1962. Trim is one of the two most successful teams (the other being Kilmessan) in the Meath Senior Hurling Championship, with these two clubs winning almost half of all contested county championships.

Trim is the hometown of the former Kilmarnock association footballer Tim Clancy. Trim Celtic and Trim Town soccer teams are in the area.

Other popular sports in the town and its hinterland include athletics, road cycling and river kayaking. The Boyne Valley Activity Centre was opened in 2011.

== Transport ==
=== Rail ===
Trim railway station opened on 26 April 1864, as part of a branch from Kilmessan to Athboy. It closed to passengers on 27 January 1947 and to goods traffic on 10 March 1947, but the branch remained open for livestock trains until final closure on 1 September 1954.

=== Bus ===
Bus Éireann operate four routes serving Trim. Route 111 from Athboy to Dublin, via Trim, operates hourly. There is also the less frequent 109B which also connects Trim to Dublin via Kilmessan and Dunshaughlin. Route 190 from Drogheda to Athlone via Trim operates hourly. Royal Breffni Tours operate a route to Dundalk Institute of Technology and Streamline Coaches operate a route to Maynooth University.

Local Link operates the 189 service from Enfield to Navan via Longwood, Trim, Dunderry and Robinstown. As of September 2025, the service operates about seven times daily.

=== Trim Aerodrome ===
Trim Flying Club, a Registered Training Facility (RTF), is based at the aerodrome and operate two aircraft. As well as Trim Flying Clubs' aircraft, the airfield is also home to other general aviation aircraft including microlights.

== Notable people ==
Ordered chronologically by date of birth

- Lommán of Trim, patron of Trim and disciple of Saint Patrick
- Hugh de Lacy, Lord of Meath, who with his son Walter, built Trim Castle
- Jonathan Swift, clergyman, author, poet
- Arthur Wellesley, 1st Duke of Wellington (1 May 1769 – 14 September 1852), whose family owned much of the town, began his parliamentary career as MP for Trim in the Irish House of Commons.
- Sir William Rowan Hamilton, physicist
- Lord Dunsany, writer
- Noel Dempsey, politician
- Darren Fay, Gaelic footballer
- Tracy Coogan, actress
- Tim Clancy, professional footballer
- Brendan Murphy, Gaelic footballer
- Ronan Moore, writer and politician

== International relations ==
=== Twin towns – sister cities ===
Trim has been twinned with Étrépagny in France since 1989.

== See also ==
- List of towns and villages in Ireland
- Market Houses in Ireland
- List of twin towns and sister cities in the Republic of Ireland
- Wellington Monument, Dublin

== Sources ==
- Stalmans, Nathalie; T.M. Charles-Edwards (2004). "Meath, saints of (act. c.400–c.900)". Oxford Dictionary of National Biography (online ed.). Oxford University Press. doi:10.1093/ref:odnb/51010. (Subscription, Wikipedia Library access or UK public library membership required.)(subscription required)
