= Walter de Brugge =

Irish clergyman and judge (died 1396)

Walter de Brugge, Walter de Brigge, or Walter de Bingee (died 1396) was an English-born clergyman and judge in fourteenth-century Ireland; much of his career was spent in the service of the Earl of March. He is mainly remembered now as the first person known to have owned a copy of the celebrated poem Piers Plowman. Ironically he himself is clearly identifiable in the poem as a corrupt Irish priest.

== Biography ==
Two common versions of his family name are early forms of Brydges (de Bingee is presumably a misspelling), so he may have been connected to the Brydges family of Coberley in Gloucestershire which held the title Baron Chandos from about 1337, and who at that time usually spelt their name Brugge. He was already "connected with Ireland" in 1369, when he was guardian of the Irish estates of Roger Mortimer, 2nd Earl of March; he later received custody of the lands held in Ireland by Roger's widow, Countess Philippa, including Moylagh, County Meath and Baliskeagh Castle, also in Meath. He spent much of his career in the service of the Mortimer family, and spent a great deal of his time travelling between the various Mortimer estates "shipping cash and auditing accounts". In the political crisis of 1387, where the 2nd Earl's natural son Sir Thomas Mortimer worked with the powerful faction of the nobility called the Lords Appellant to defeat King Richard II, Brugge, who was described as being constantly "on the move", served as a useful go-between among the Appellants.

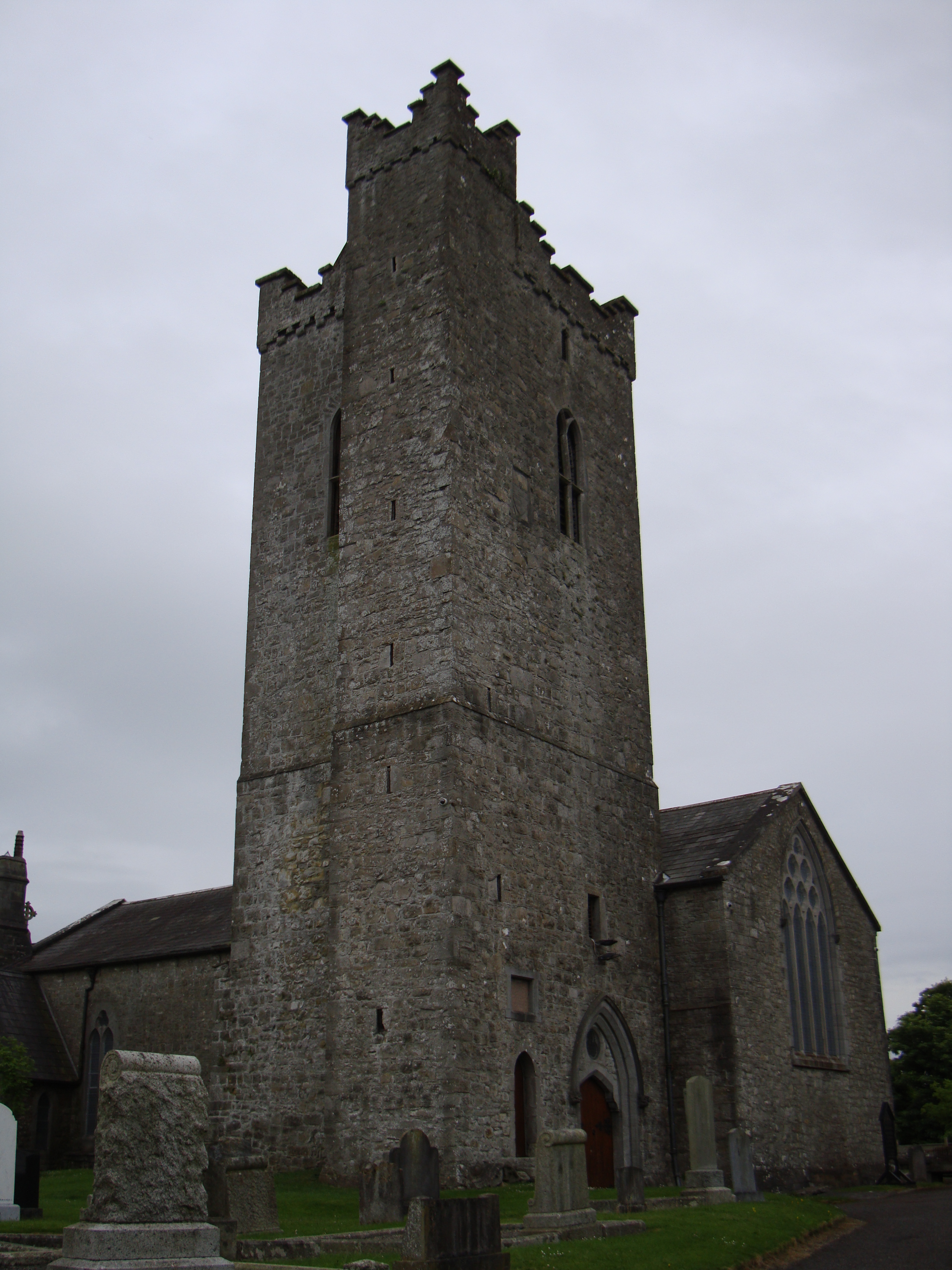
Trim Cathedral, formerly St. Patrick's Church- Walter was appointed vicar of the church in 1381.

As a clergyman he was frequently accused of corruption, and he was certainly guilty of pluralism, being Archdeacon of Meath, Archdeacon of Kells, vicar of Burwell, Cambridgeshire, vicar of St. Patrick's Church, Trim, (now Trim Cathedral) from 1381, prebendary of York, Hereford, St. David's, and of Howth in St Patrick's Cathedral, Dublin. He attempted to become Chancellor of St Patrick's Cathedral, but was opposed by John de Karlell, a fellow Baron of the Exchequer. A petition from Brugge to the English Privy Council dating from about 1377 survives, asking for the King to examine the evidence so that justice might be done to him in the dispute. In spite of his pleas, the office went to Karlell, who had filed a counter-petition. Brugge became a Baron of the Court of Exchequer (Ireland) in 1381, and died in 1396. He was a member of the Privy Council of Ireland. The John Brugge who was granted the manors of Ratoath and Ardmulchan in County Meath by the Crown in 1425 may have been a nephew of Walter.

== Piers Plowman ==
He is said to have possessed a considerable library, and he is the first person known to have owned a copy of the famous medieval poem Piers Plowman, by William Langland, which was written between 1370 and 1380. This is somewhat ironic since the "false priest in Ireland" whom the poet denounces for corruption- "I care nothing for conscience so that I catch silver" - has recently been identified as none other than de Brugge himself: but even if de Brugge knew that the reference was to him it clearly did not prevent him from enjoying the poem.

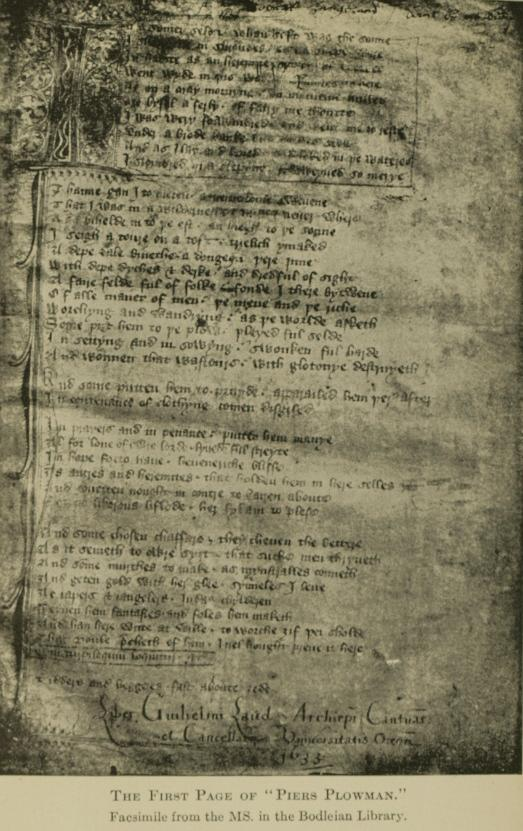
Piers Plowman - First edition
