= Trim Cathedral =

St Patrick's Cathedral, Trim
- The Cathedral Church of St. Patrick, Trim
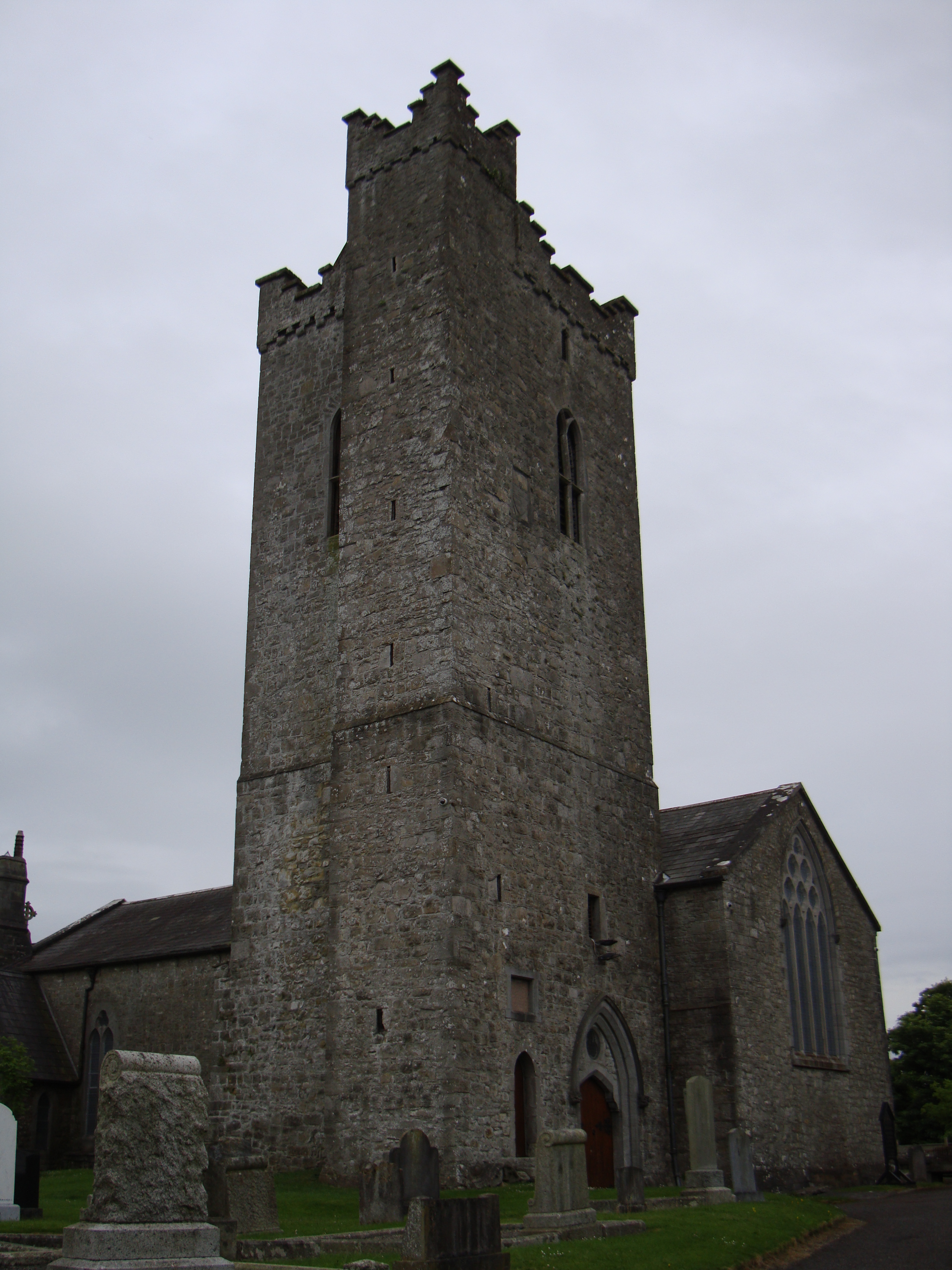
- St Patrick's Cathedral, Trim
- 53°33′30.7″N 6°47′26.2″W
- Location: Trim, County Meath
- Country: Ireland
- Denomination: Church of Ireland
- Previous denomination: Roman Catholic
- Website: https://trimandathboy.com/

History
- Dedication: Saint Patrick

Administration
- Province: Province of Dublin
- Diocese: United Dioceses of Meath and Kildare

Clergy
- Bishop: Most Rev. Patricia Storey
- Dean: Very Rev. Paul Bogle

The Cathedral Church of St Patrick, Trim is a cathedral of the Church of Ireland in Trim, County Meath, Ireland. Previously the cathedral of the Diocese of Meath, it is now one of two cathedrals in the United Dioceses of Meath and Kildare which is part of the ecclesiastical province of Dublin.

== History ==
The tower is a remnant of the medieval parish Church of Trim.

Walter de Brugge, an English-born judge, was appointed vicar of St. Patrick's in 1381. Robert Dyke, a very senior Crown official and future Lord Treasurer of Ireland, became vicar in 1435. Philip Norris, the notably controversial and outspoken Dean of St Patrick's Cathedral, Dublin, was vicar here in the 1440s and 1450s.

Bishops have been enthroned here since 1536 but it was not raised to Cathedral status until 1955.

The tower clock commemorates Dean Butler, the historian of Trim. Stained glass in the West window was the first-ever stained glass designed by Edward Burne-Jones. In 1992 the cathedral was re-roofed and beams renewed in the gallery.

== See also ==
- Dean of Clonmacnoise - List of deans of St Patrick's
