= Donald Caird =

Irish bishop (1925–2017)

The Right Reverend Donald Caird
- Archbishop of Dublin; Primate of Ireland
- Church: Church of Ireland
- Diocese: Dublin and Glendalough
- Elected: 1985
- In office: 1985-1996
- Predecessor: Henry McAdoo
- Successor: Walton Empey
- Previous posts: Bishop of Limerick, Ardfert and Aghadoe (1970-1976); Bishop of Meath and Kildare (1976-1985)

Orders
- Consecration: 29 September 1970 by Alan Buchanan

Personal details
- Born: 11 December 1925 Dublin, Ireland
- Died: 1 June 2017 (aged 91) Dublin, Ireland
- Denomination: Anglican
- Spouse: Nancy Sharpe
- Education: Wesley College, Dublin; Trinity College, Dublin

Donald Arthur Richard Caird (11 December 1925 – 1 June 2017) was an Irish bishop who held three senior posts in the Church of Ireland during the last third of the 20th century.

He was born in Dublin and educated at Wesley College and Trinity College in his native city studying Mental and Moral Science (Philosophy) where he won a scholarship in 1948 and graduated in 1949. He was ordained in 1950. He began his career at St Mark's, Dundela, Belfast. He was Chaplain and an Assistant Master at Portora Royal School, Enniskillen until 1957. He was a lecturer in philosophy at University College of St David's, Lampeter. He was Rector of Rathmichael Parish, Shankill, Dublin and a lecturer in the philosophy of religion at the Church of Ireland Theological College, Dublin. From 1969 to 1970 he was Dean of Ossory when he was ordained to the episcopate as the last Bishop of Limerick, Ardfert and Aghadoe, a post he held until 1976. He was translated to the Diocese of Meath and Kildare and he served there until 1985 when he was elected Archbishop of Dublin and Primate of Ireland. He retired in 1996.

Donald Caird took a keen interest in the Irish language from an early age. He encountered members of Cumann Gaelach na hEaglaise (the Irish Guild of the Church) at an Irish language service in Dublin's St Patrick's Cathedral in the early 1940s, which made a deep impression on him. Around this time, he was sent to the Gaeltacht in West Kerry by his father to improve his Irish, staying in the Dún Chaoin area and was fascinated to encounter members of his church community worshipping in Irish at a small church at Kilmalkeader (Cill Mhaolcheadair) on the Dingle peninsula, overlooking the Atlantic. He was appointed to Bord na Gaeilge, the state body for the promotion of the language, in 1975 while Bishop of Limerick, by Tom O'Donnell TD, Minister for the Gaeltacht.

He died on 1 June 2017 at the age of 91.

Church of Ireland titles
Preceded by Robert Wyse Jackson	Bishop of Limerick, Ardfert and Aghadoe; 1970–1976	Succeeded by Final appointment
Preceded by Inaugural appointment	Bishop of Meath and Kildare; 1976–1984	Succeeded by Walton Newcombe Frances Empey
Preceded by Henry McAdoo	Archbishop of Dublin; 1985–1996	Succeeded by Walton Newcombe Frances Empey
