= John de Karlell =

English-born cleric, civil servant and judge

John de Karlell (died 1393) was an English-born cleric, civil servant and judge in fourteenth-century Ireland. He served as second Baron of the Court of Exchequer, and as Chancellor of the Irish Exchequer. He became Chancellor of St Patrick's Cathedral, Dublin, after a struggle for the office with his colleague Walter de Brugge.

== Origins ==
He took his family name from his birthplace, Carlisle, Cumberland, and was sometimes called simply John Karlell; he was the brother of William de Karlell, whose career paralleled his own. Insulting remarks made by political opponents about William's "low station in life" are evidence that the brothers came from a relatively humble background, a subject on which they are known to have been sensitive, even to the point of bringing legal proceedings against those who disparaged them. William arrived in Ireland in the entourage of the King's second son Lionel of Antwerp, the Lord Lieutenant of Ireland, in 1361; John may have come to Ireland at the same time, though little is heard of him until after 1370. In 1368 he became parish priest of Welbury in Yorkshire.

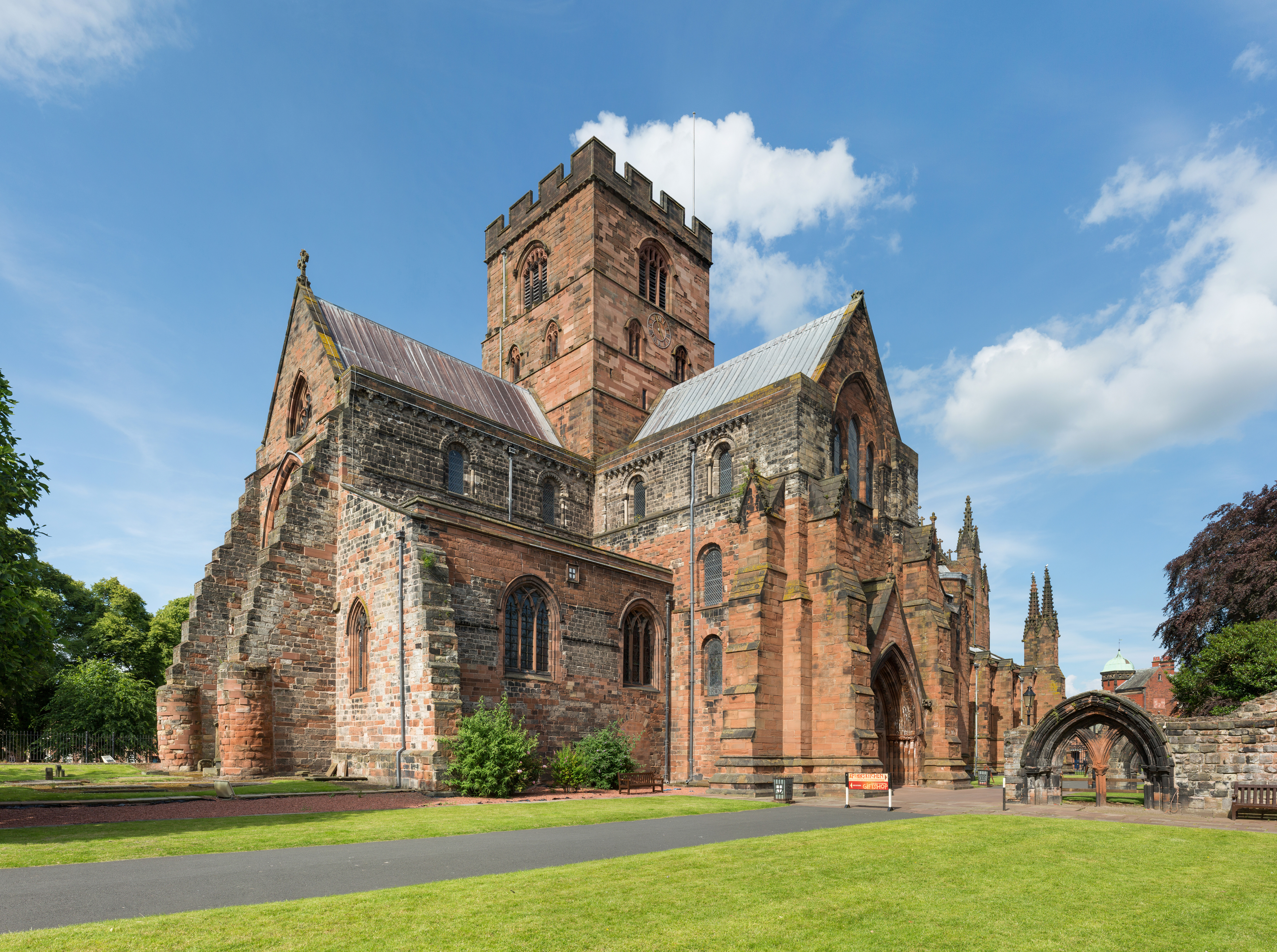
Carlisle Cathedral

== Career ==
Both brothers sat in the Irish House of Commons as members for Kilkenny City in the Parliament of 1374 and both served as Barons of the Court of Exchequer (Ireland). William was dismissed from office in 1376 after facing a flood of charges of "extortion and oppression". John was appointed second Baron "so long as he was of good behaviour". They were hard-working Crown officials with wide-ranging duties, (though William at least made numerous enemies, who worked hard for his removal), and both were well rewarded for their services: John was given a licence to export wheat to France and Portugal, and to "levy profits" while absent from Ireland. He was appointed Chancellor of the Exchequer of Ireland in 1374 "during the King's pleasure" at the usual fee. He was superseded as Chancellor in 1376 in favour of Thomas Bache. He acted as papal collector of taxes in 1381. He was ex officio a member of the Privy Council of Ireland, and we have a record of his attendance at a Council meeting in October 1391. He was involved in the issuing of two invitations to the King's uncle Thomas of Woodstock, Duke of Gloucester to visit Ireland in 1392.

Like many clerics of the time, he was something of a pluralist: he was prebendary of Ferns and Limerick, and became parish priest of Culfeightrin, now Ballycastle, County Antrim in 1389.

== Contest with Walter de Brugge ==
In 1376 he was nominated as Chancellor of St Patrick's, but he had a strong rival for the office in Walter de Brugge. Walter had a very similar background to John, being a fellow Baron of the Exchequer and a clergyman noted for pluralism; like John he had connections to the Crown, being a close associate of Lionel of Antwerp's son-in-law Edmund Mortimer, 3rd Earl of March. In 1377 de Brugge petitioned the Privy Council of Ireland, asking them to examine the evidence and pleading for justice to be done to him. His plea was unsuccessful. Karlell, who had submitted a counter-petition that Brugge's appointment as Chancellor, which seems to have been announced prematurely, be delayed, was confirmed as Chancellor in December 1377.

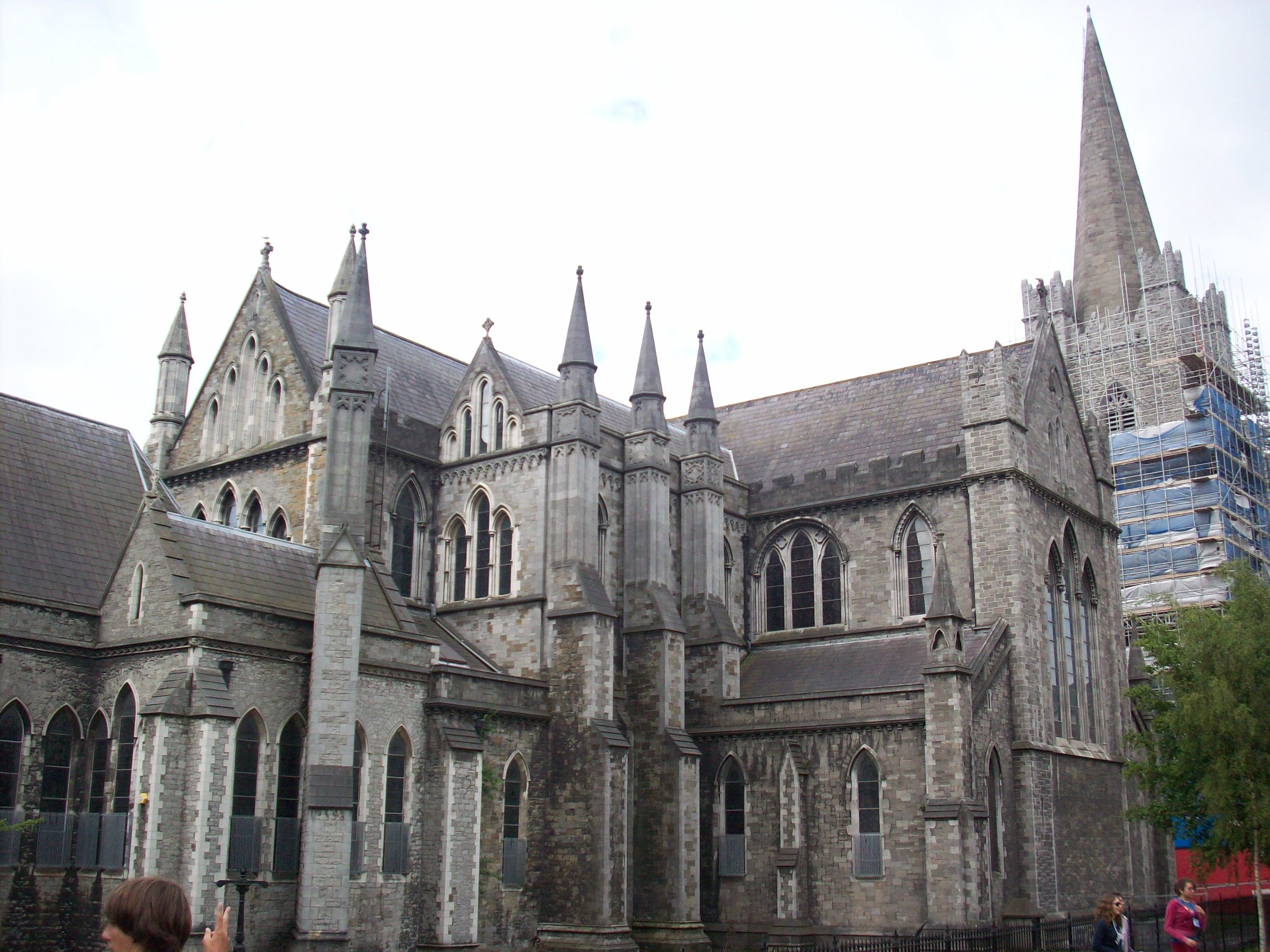
St Patrick's Cathedral

== Death and burial ==
At his death, despite his long association with St Patrick's Cathedral, Dublin, John chose to be buried close to his brother William (who had died ten years earlier) in St Canice's Cathedral, Kilkenny. His tomb has long since been destroyed.

His executor, William Karlell, was probably a grand-nephew: he is described in the Patent Roll as "the son of John Karlell". He petitioned that the estate be forgiven the debts to the Crown owed by the two brothers, and the petition was granted on payment by William of £40.
