= Pat Storey =

Irish Anglican bishop (born 1960)

The Most Reverend Pat Storey
- Bishop of Meath and Kildare
- Church: Church of Ireland
- Diocese: Diocese of Meath and Kildare
- In office: 2013 to 2026
- Predecessor: Richard Clarke

Orders
- Ordination: 1997 (deacon); 1998 (priest)
- Consecration: 30 November 2013 by Richard Clarke

Personal details
- Born: Patricia Shaw; 30 March 1960 (age 66) Belfast
- Spouse: Earl Storey
- Children: 2
- Education: Trinity College, Dublin; Church of Ireland Theological College

Patricia Storey (née Shaw; born 30 March 1960) is a retired Irish Anglican bishop. From 2013 to 2026 she was the Bishop of Meath and Kildare in the Church of Ireland. She was the first woman to become a bishop in the Church of Ireland and the first woman to be an Anglicanbishop in Ireland and Great Britain.

== Early life and education ==
Storey was born 30 March 1960. She was educated at the Methodist College Belfast, a grammar school in Belfast, Northern Ireland.

She studied French and English at Trinity College, Dublin, graduating with a Bachelor of Arts (BA) degree in 1983; as per tradition, her BA was later promoted to a Master of Arts (MA Dubl) degree. In 1994, she began to train for ordination at the Church of Ireland Theological College. She graduated in 1997 with a Bachelor of Theology (BTh) degree.

== Ordained ministry ==
Storey was ordained in the Church of Ireland as deacon in 1997 and priest in 1998. From 1997 to 2000, she served her curacy in the Parish of Kilconriola and Ballyclug, (Ballymena), County Antrim. From 2000 to 2004, she was an assistant curate at St Aidan's Church, Glenavy, County Antrim. In 2004, she was appointed rector of St Augustine's Church, Derry.

=== Episcopal ministry ===
On 19 September 2013, Storey was chosen by the House of Bishops to succeed Richard Clarke as Bishop of Meath and Kildare. She was consecrated to the episcopate at Christ Church Cathedral, Dublin, on 30 November 2013. She was the first woman to be elected as a bishop in the Church of Ireland and the first woman to be an Anglican bishop in Ireland and Great Britain.

She retired on 31 July 2026 [https://www.churchofireland.org/news/13300/bishop-patricia-storey-announces-retirement]

As Bishop of Meath and Kildare, she was the only Anglican bishop who is not also an archbishop or primate to be styled The Most Reverend (rather than The Right Reverend), the style usually restricted to archbishops or primates.

=== Views ===
Storey has described her churchmanship as "open liberal evangelical". She was previously a board member of the Evangelical Alliance. She voted 'no' on same-gender marriage in Ireland but, at the same time, affirmed civil unions and partnerships for same-gender couples thus taking a middle of the road approach. In her words, "I believe that civil partnerships give gay people clear civil rights and recognition as people committed to one another, and I fully endorse this. ... However, I do not think this requires the redefinition of marriage to uphold it, and I do not believe marriage should be redefined."

== Personal life ==
Storey is married to an Anglican priest, Earl Storey.

Church of Ireland titles
| Preceded by Richard Clarke | Bishop of Meath and Kildare; 2013–present | Incumbent |
