= Porch Fields =

Archaeological site in Republic of Ireland

- Goirt Péirse (Irish)
- Porchfields, Porchfield
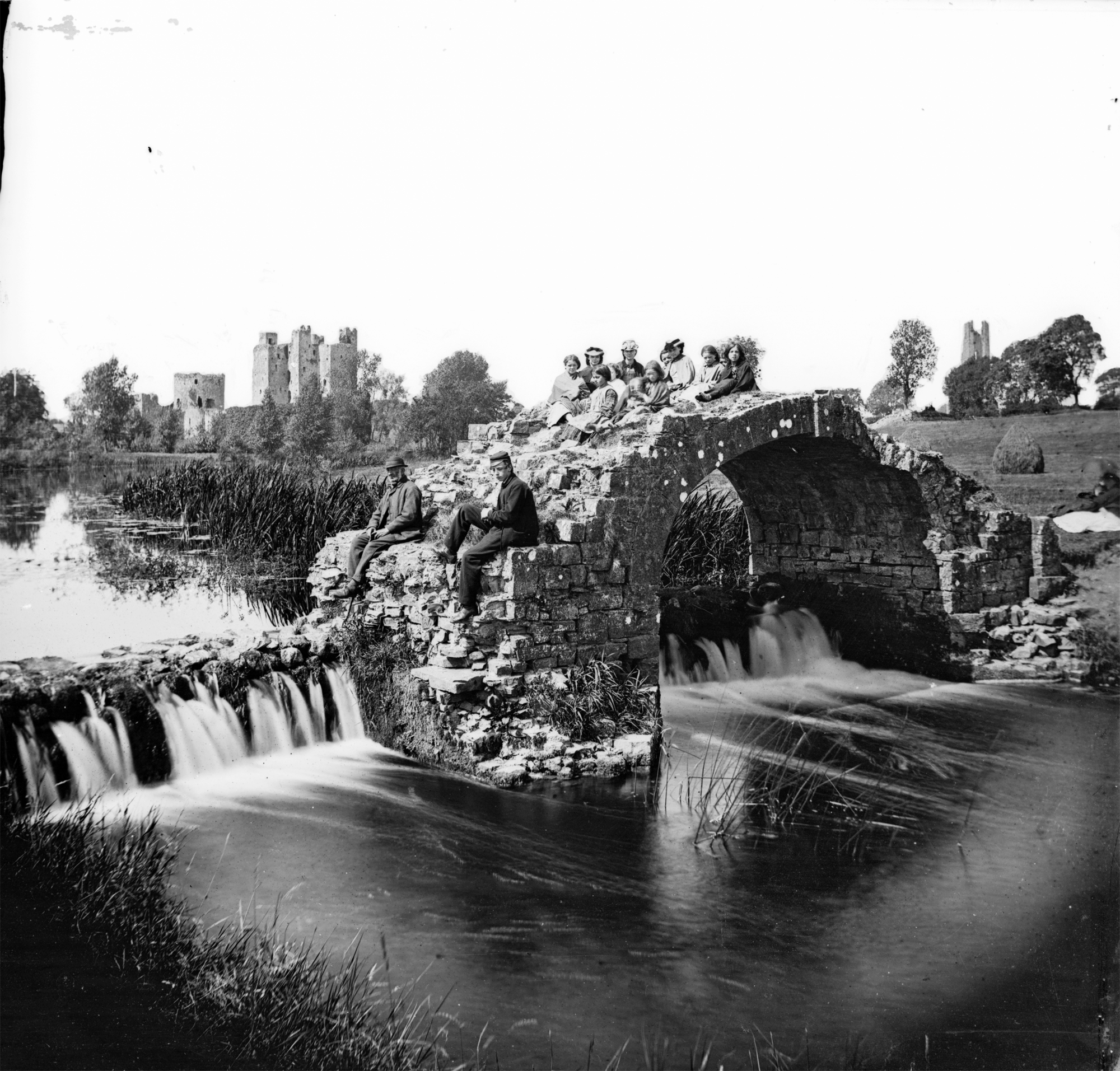
- View over the Boyne looking at Porch Fields. Photo from the late 19th century.

- Location within Ireland
- 53.554921°N 6.784334°W
- Type: Area of land with medieval roadway
- Periods: Late Middle Ages
- Location: Trim, County Meath, Ireland
- Region: Boyne Valley

Site notes
- Elevation: 59 m (194 ft)
- Area: 37.4 ha (92 acres)
- Owner: Public
- Public access: yes

Designations
Designation
Designations
National monument of Ireland
- Official name: Porch Fields
- Reference no.: 679

The Porch Fields is an area of medieval farmland outside Trim, Ireland with a medieval roadway that forms a National Monument.

== Location ==
The Porch Fields are a green area in Trim, located on the north bank of the River Boyne, between the old town wall and Sheep Gate to the west and Newtown Abbey to the east.

== History ==
The Porchfield lies between the Anglo‐Norman town of Trim founded c. 1180 and the rural borough of Newtown Trim founded c. 1220. The two towns were connected through the open field via a medieval sunken lane road about 1 km (0.6 mi) in length. The new burgesses were awarded 3 acres (1.2 ha) of land each. They used ridge and furrow agriculture to grow crops, and each narrow strip was one perch (5 m, 16 ft) wide — this may is how the Porch Fields acquired their name. However, it could also derive from the French porte meaning 'door', referring to the Sheep Gate. The name "Portual Field" appears on a nineteenth-century map.

It is claimed that Oliver Cromwell's troops made camp on the Porch Fields before the 1649 Siege of Drogheda.
