= Richard Clarke (bishop) =

Irish Anglican bishop and author

The Right Reverend Richard Clarke
- Archbishop of Armagh; Primate of All Ireland
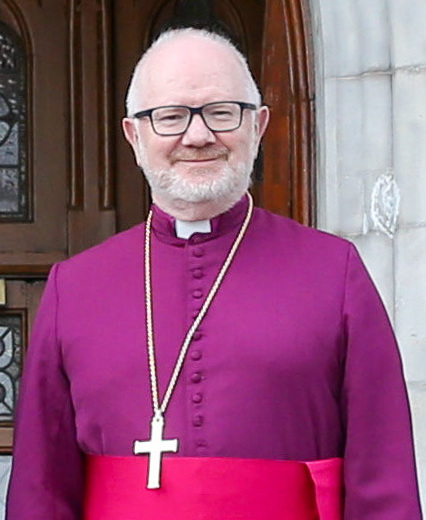
- Clarke in 2019
- Church: Church of Ireland
- Province: Armagh
- Diocese: Armagh
- Elected: 15 December 2012
- In office: 2012–2020
- Predecessor: Alan Harper
- Successor: John McDowell
- Previous posts: Dean of Cork; Bishop of Meath and Kildare

Orders
- Ordination: 1974 (Deacon); 1976 (Priest)
- Consecration: 14 September 1996 by Walton Empey

Personal details
- Born: Richard Lionel Clarke; 25 June 1949 (age 77) Dublin, Ireland
- Denomination: Anglican
- Spouse: Linda (m. 1975; died 2009)
- Children: Nicholas; Lindsey
- Education: Trinity College, Dublin; King's College London

Richard Lionel Clarke (born 25 June 1949) is a retired Irish Anglican bishop and author. From 2012 to 2020, he served as the Archbishop of Armagh and Primate of All Ireland: as such, he was the senior cleric of the Church of Ireland.

== Early life and education ==
Clarke was born on 25 June 1949 in Dublin, Ireland. He was educated at Drumcondra National School and at Wesley College, a fee-paying independent school in Dublin. He attended Trinity College, Dublin (M.A., Ph.D.) and King's College London (B.D.) where he studied history and theology.

== Ordained ministry ==
Clarke was ordained a deacon in 1975 and priest in 1976, serving as a curate in Holywood, County Down for two years from 1975 to 1977 and again as a curate at St Bartholomew's with Christ Church, Leeson Park, Dublin from 1977 to 1979, before serving as Dean of Residence at Trinity College, Dublin for five years. Clarke travelled thence to Bandon, County Cork, where he served as rector until 1993 when he was appointed Dean of Cork.

=== Episcopal ministry ===
Clarke was elected and consecrated to the bishopric of Meath and Kildare in 1996.

In 2012, he was elected, in succession to Alan Harper, to be the Archbishop of Armagh and Primate of All Ireland. His translation to Armagh took effect on 15 December 2012, on which date he also was enthroned at St Patrick's Cathedral.

On 2 November 2019, during his presidential address to Armagh Diocesan Synod, Clarke announced that he would retire on 2 February 2020. The Archbishop of Dublin, the Most Reverend Dr Michael Jackson, paid tribute to Clarke after the announcement, saying, "Archbishop Clarke has dedicated his life to the service of God and the church."

== Personal life ==
Clarke married Linda Margaret Thompson in 1975: she died in 2009. He has two children and three grandchildren, as of 2017.

== Selected works ==
Clarke is the author of And Is It True? (2000), The Unharmonious Blacksmith (2002), A Whisper of God (2006), and Shouldering the Lamb: Reflections on an Icon (2017).

Church of Ireland titles
Preceded by Maurice Carey	Dean of Cork; 1993–1996	Succeeded by Michael Jackson
Preceded by Walton Empey	Bishop of Meath and Kildare; 1996–2012	Succeeded by Pat Storey
Preceded by Alan Harper	Archbishop of Armagh; 2012–2020	Succeeded by John McDowell (bishop)
Order of precedence in Northern Ireland
Preceded by High sheriffs of counties (see list here) (during term of office and within bounds of counties)	Gentlemen; Church of Ireland; Archbishop of Armagh and Primate of All Ireland	Succeeded by Eamon Martin
