= St. Mary's Abbey, Trim =

Coordinates: 53°33′19″N 6°47′13″W

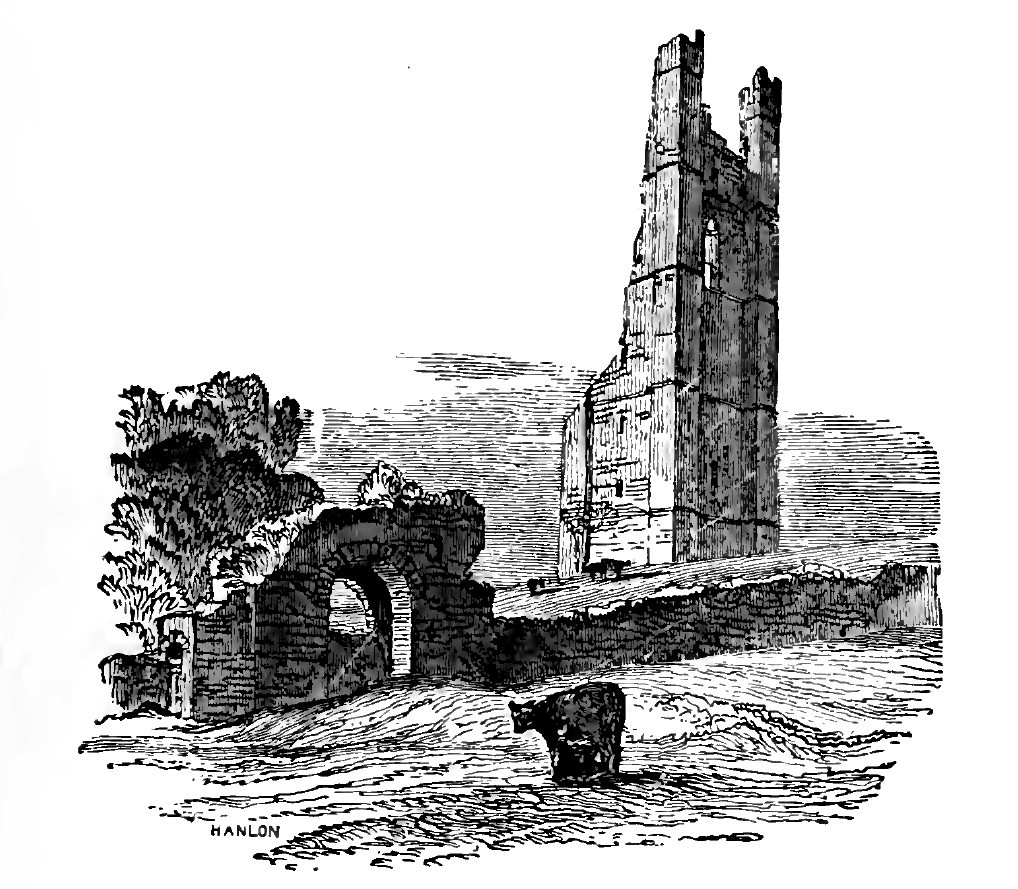
The Yellow Steeple behind the "Sheep's Gate," part of the old city wall, from a nineteenth century sketch

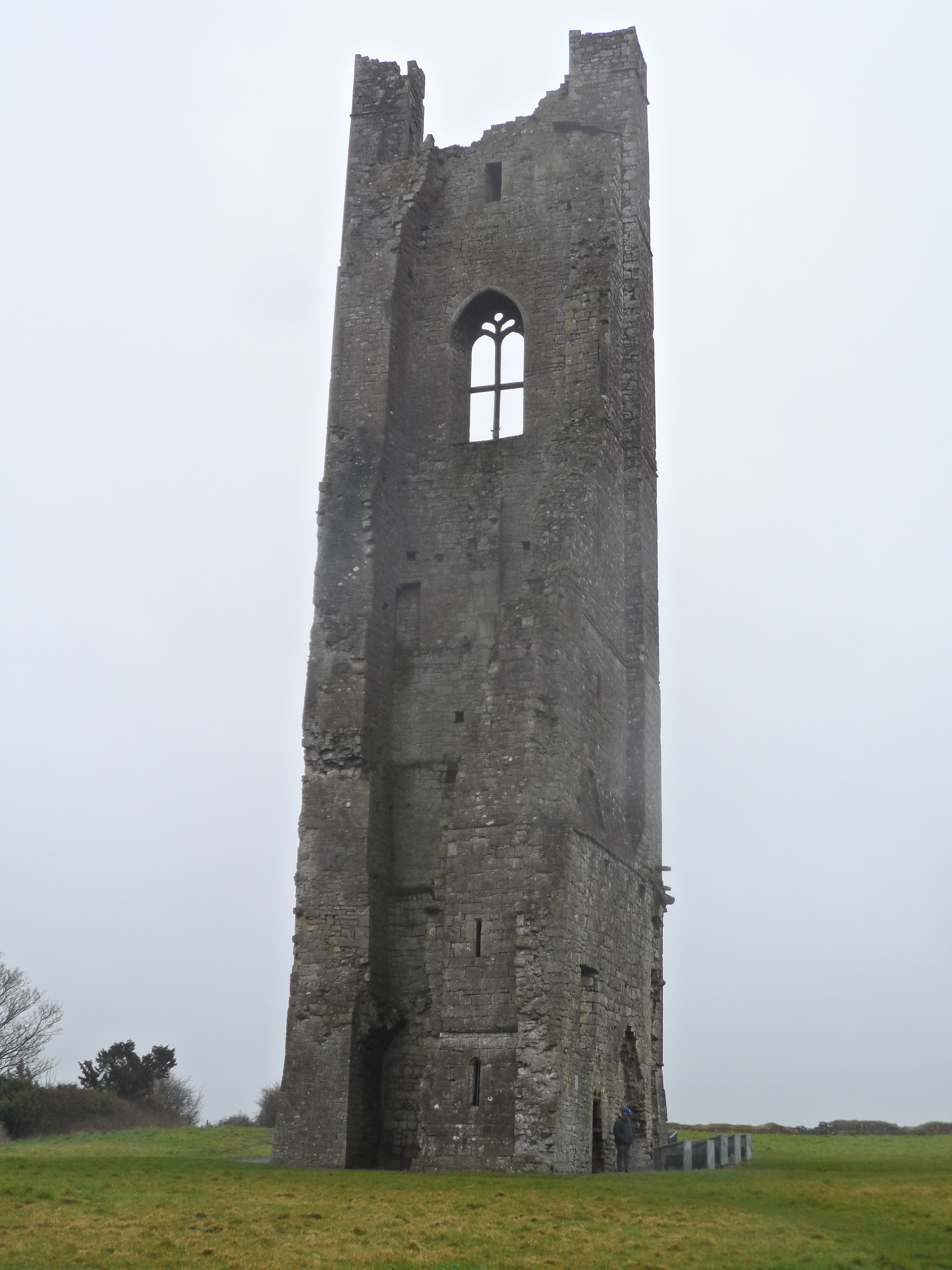
Yellow Steeple.

St. Mary's Abbey in Trim, County Meath, Ireland is a former house of Augustinian canons dedicated to the Blessed Virgin. The abbey was situated on the north bank of the River Boyne, opposite Trim Castle, on land given to St. Patrick who is often credited with founding the abbey. The abbey was a prominent pilgrimage site, famous for the healing power of its statue of the Virgin Mary, until its dissolution under Henry VIII during the Reformation. Little remains of the abbey except for the Yellow Steeple, the ruin of the abbey bell tower named for the yellow color reflected by the stonework in the setting sun, and Talbot's Castle, an abbey building converted to a manor house.

== History ==
According to tradition, St. Patrick founded the church at Trim. The church of Trim was destroyed at least twice by attacking forces in 1108 and 1127. In both attacks, residents seeking sanctuary burned when the church was set afire around them. Perhaps after the fires, the church was re founded as an Augustinian abbey in the twelfth century and dedicated to St. Mary but the abbey continued to serve as the parish church. As Papal legate, St. Malachy introduced the Arrousian form of Augustinian rule to the abbey between 1140 and 1148. The de Lacy family is associated with the abbey in the thirteenth century. The church burned again in 1368. Shortly after the fire, the abbey erected a statue of the Virgin Mary that would become famous for working healing miracles. The statue achieved national renown as the most celebrated shrine to Mary in Ireland and pilgrims flocked to it. In 1402, Henry IV granted protection to pilgrims to the abbey, including Irish rebels. This protection continued under Henry V, and, in 1472, a parliament at Naas passed an act that endowed the abbey with a manor and two watermills to fund a perpetual candle to be burned at the statue, four candles during the mass of St. Mary, and a chantry. Additionally, the act confirmed a donation by Richard, Duke of York of fifty-one acres and other lands, and granted protection to the pilgrims who came to see the icon. According to medieval Irish chronicles, the statue performed many healing miracles around the fifteenth century to the extent that a few have referred to Trim as the "Lourdes of Ireland".

Royal support soured during the religious reforms and the dissolution of the monasteries under Henry VIII. Given the statue's fame Archbishop Browne hesitated to destroy the icon. Nevertheless, the Madonna did not escape the flames of iconoclasm. The statue was publicly burned in 1538. According to one account, the badly charred statue survived and was held in a private, Catholic household. The abbey did not live long past its relic. On 15 May 1542 agents of Henry VIII forced Geoffry Dardice, St. Mary's last abbot, to sign his own expulsion. About a month after the expulsion, the abbot received an annual pension of £15. The wealth of the abbey, recorded as £1,861 15s. 2d. (£9 million based on average earnings converted to 2008 value) was seized by the crown and its agents. Sir Anthony St. Leger received the abbey's lands for 100 marks plus an annual rent of 3s. 4d.

The Yellow Steeple is alleged to have been destroyed by Oliver Cromwell. The story of the tower's destruction is based on local tradition. According to one account, the Yellow Steeple was actually used as a garrison against Cromwell's troops until the tower was destroyed.

== Remains ==
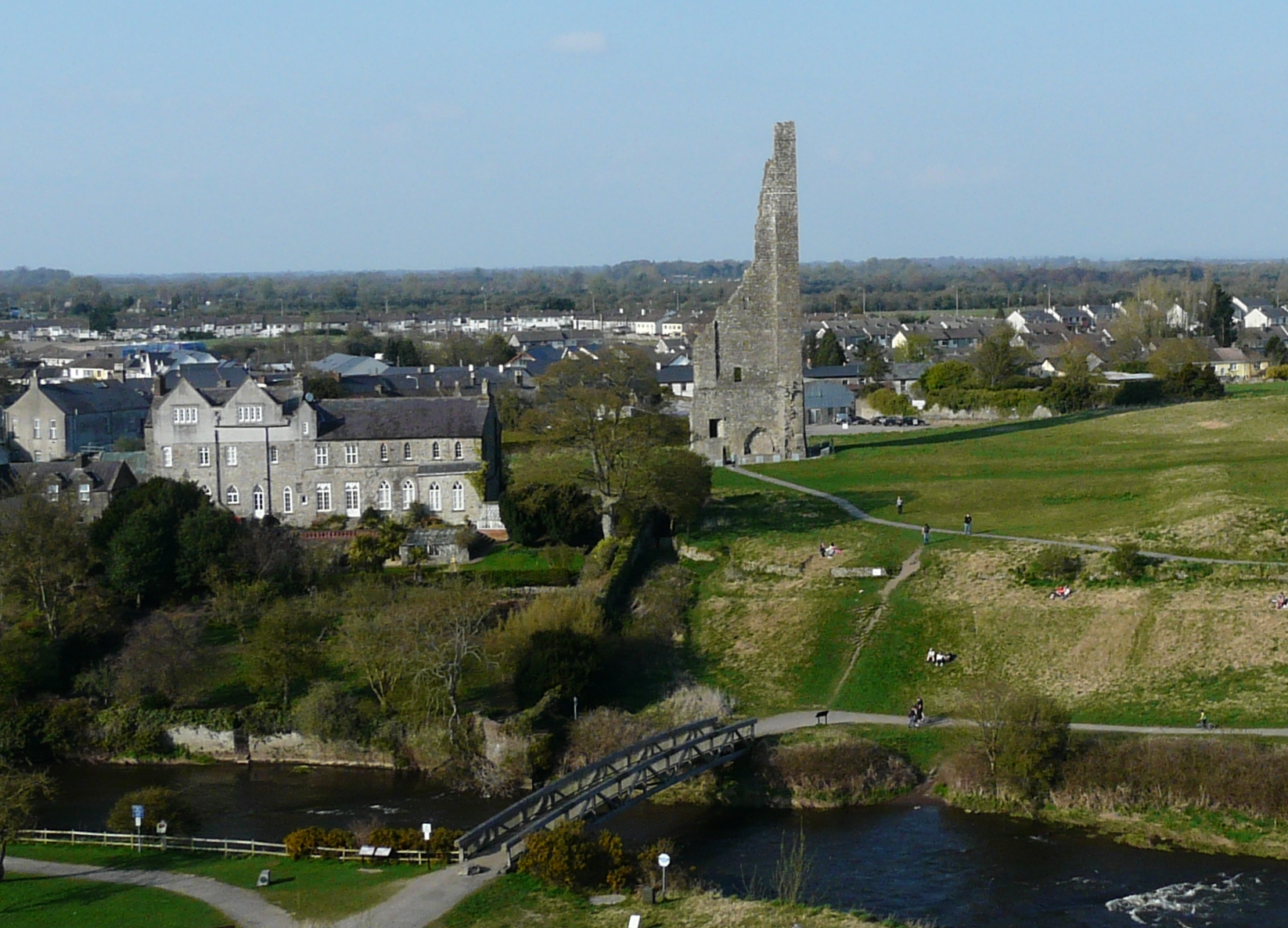
The extant remains of the abbey, Talbot's Castle (left) and the Yellow Steeple (right), across the Boyne (foreground) from Trim Castle

The 40 metres (130 ft) Yellow Steeple is the most prominent remnant of the abbey even though it is a ruin. The tower is thought to have been built shortly after the 1368 fire, but there is also a suggestion that it was built under Richard, Duke of York around 1450. The tower, constructed of punched and squared limestone, served as the abbey's bell tower. The tower still retains the remnant of a spiral staircase, which was built without a newel. The eastern wall rises seven storeys and the southern wall reaches five, but little to nothing remains of the other sides of the formerly square tower. The eastern wall retains two clasping corner buttresses. The walls are mostly plain with a few windows and other simple decoration. The most elaborate feature is the double-pointed belfry window underneath a flower-let formed by a tracery pattern. The south wall is partly built of rubble suggesting that it was an interior wall. There are signs that a tall pointed object, such as a funerary monument, was connected to the south wall. The abbey church most likely was connected to the tower from the south.

While the Yellow Steeple is often considered the only extant remain of the abbey, some evidence suggests that Talbot's Castle, a nearby manor house, may have been the abbey's refectory. The size, shape, and internal features indicate the "Castle" may have served as a monastic building before being converted to a private residence.
