= Henry McAdoo =

Irish bishop

The Right Reverend Henry McAdoo
- Archbishop of Dublin; Primate of Ireland
- Church: Church of Ireland
- Diocese: Dublin and Glendalough
- Elected: 15 April 1977
- In office: 1977-1985
- Predecessor: John Gregg
- Successor: George Simms
- Previous post: Bishop of Ossory, Ferns and Leighlin (1962-1977)

Orders
- Ordination: 1940
- Consecration: 11 March 1962 by George Simms

Personal details
- Born: 10 January 1916 Cork, County Cork, Ireland
- Died: 10 December 1998 (aged 82) Dalkey, County Dublin, Republic of Ireland
- Buried: St Canice's Cathedral
- Denomination: Anglican
- Parents: James Arthur McAdoo & Susan Good
- Spouse: Lesley Weir
- Children: 3

Henry Robert McAdoo (10 January 1916 – 10 December 1998) was a Church of Ireland clergyman.

He was born in Cork and educated at Cork Grammar School and Mountjoy School in Dublin. He studied modern languages (French and Irish) in Trinity College Dublin, was scholar in 1936 and graduated in 1938.

He was ordained as a deacon in 1939 and as a priest in 1940. He was the incumbent of Castleventry with Ardfield from 1943 to 1948, with Kilmeen from 1947 to 1948, Rector of Kilmocomogue and Rural Dean of Glansalney West and Bere from 1948 to 1952 and Canon of Kilbrittain in Cork Cathedral, and Canon of Donoughmore in Cloyne Cathedral from 1949 to 1952. He served as Dean of Cork 1952–62, Dean of Leighlin, 1962–63; Bishop of Ossory, Ferns and Leighlin 1962–77 and Archbishop of Dublin 1977–85.

He argued for and supported the ordination of women to the priesthood.

...during the run-up to Lambeth 1968, prolonged reflection convinced me that there was no valid Biblical basis and no fundamental theological reason for denying the priesthood to women; that such ordinations were not against the divine order.

He was the first Anglican co-chairman of the Anglican Roman Catholic International Commission. His time as archbishop was cut short by ill-health and he resigned in 1985.

He died on 10 December 1998 at Dalkey, County Dublin and was buried at Kilkenny. He had married Lesley Weir, with whom he had a son and two daughters.

Church of Ireland titles
Preceded by Alan Buchanan	Archbishop of Dublin; 1977–1985	Succeeded by Donald Caird
