= Diocese of Meath and Kildare =

Anglican diocese of the Church of Ireland

United Dioceses of Meath and Kildare Dioecesis Unitae Midensis et Kildarensis Deoisí Aontaithe na Mí agus Chill Dara
- Coat of arms

Location
- Ecclesiastical province: Dublin and Cashel

Information
- Denomination: Anglican
- Cathedral: Trim Cathedral, Kildare Cathedral

Current leadership
- Bishop: Pat Storey, Bishop of Meath and Kildare

Website
- www.meathandkildare.org

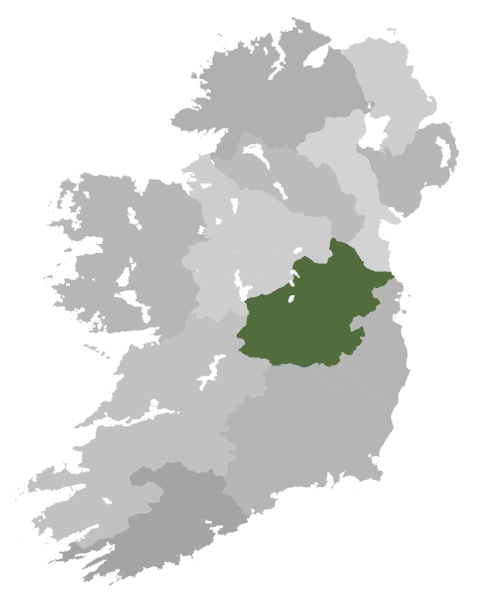

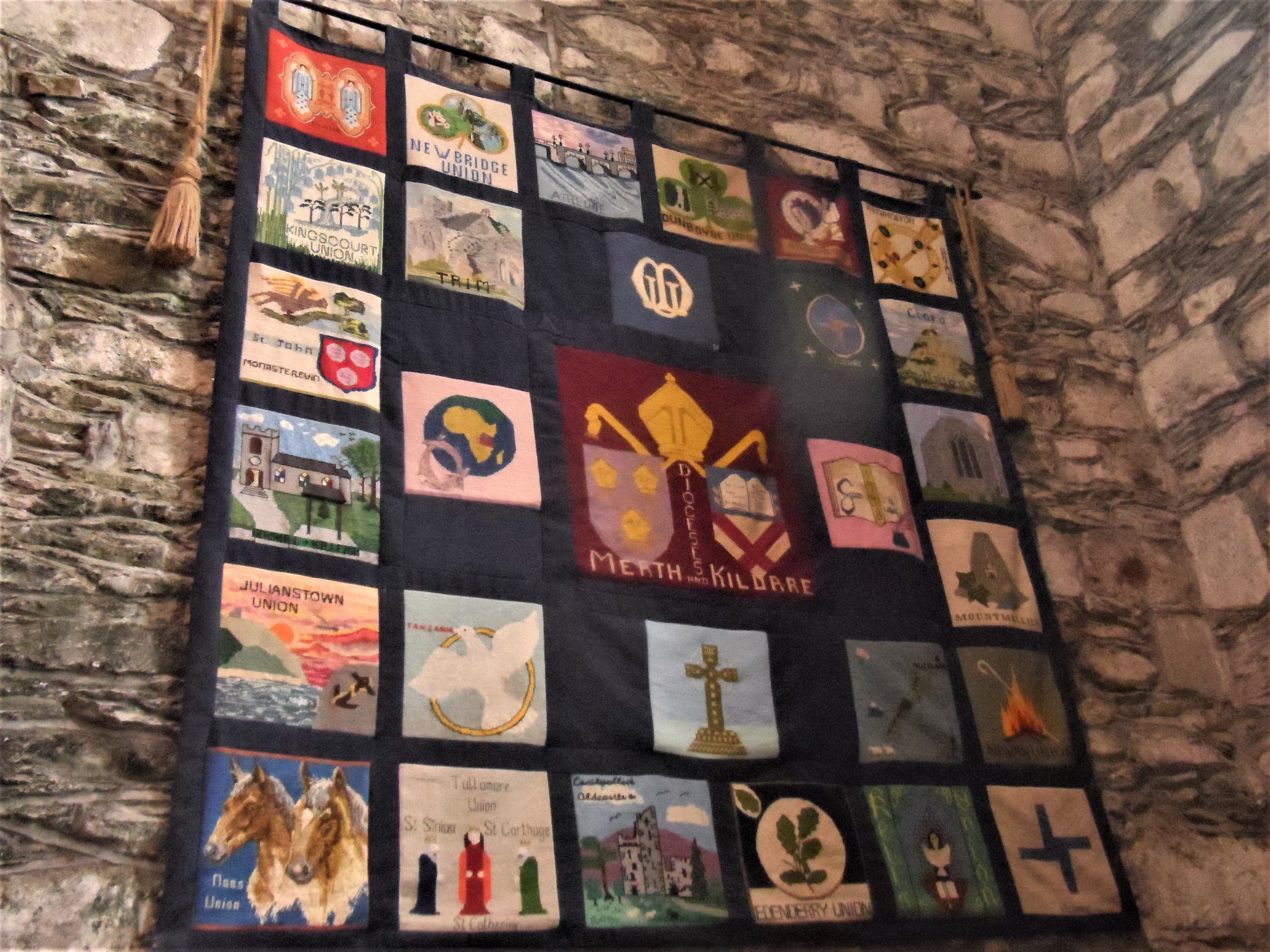
Wall hanging depicting the parishes of the United Dioceses

The United Dioceses of Meath and Kildare is a diocese in the Church of Ireland located in Ireland. The diocese is in the ecclesiastical province of Dublin. Alone of English and Irish bishops who are not also archbishops, the Bishop of Meath and Kildare is styled "The Most Reverend".

The electoral college met in Christ Church Cathedral, Dublin on 28 May 2013 and no candidate put forward received the support of two-thirds of the electoral college voting in orders (lay and clergy). On 20 September 2013, it was announced that the House of Bishops (to whom the appointment had lapsed on the failure of the college's vote) had appointed as bishop-elect Pat Storey, who became the first woman to be a bishop in the Church of Ireland.

== History of the Diocese of Meath ==
Although there had been abbot-bishops at Clonard Abbey since the sixth century, the Diocese of Clonard proper was not formally established until 1111. It was one of the twenty-four dioceses established by the Synod of Rathbreasail. The diocese covered roughly the western part of the Kingdom of Meath with the bishop's seat located at Clonard Abbey. During the twelfth century, the bishops of Clonard acquired most of Meath as their territory and frequently used the title "Bishop of Meath" or "Bishop of the men of Meath". After Bishop Simon Rochfort transferred his seat from Clonard to Trim in 1202, the normal style became the "Bishop of Meath".

== History of the Diocese of Kildare ==
In the 5th century, the Abbey of Kildare was founded by Saint Brigid, a double monastery of nuns and monks. The abbey was governed by an abbess, who was the "heir of Brigit" (comarbae Brigte), and by abbots, bishops and abbot-bishops who were subordinate to the abbess. It was not until the 12th century however, that the bishopric was formally established at the Synod of Rathbreasail (1111 AD). The diocese covered roughly the northern part of County Kildare and the eastern part of County Offaly.

== Diocesan structure ==
=== In Meath ===
The cathedral church of the former diocese is Trim Cathedral. There are ten parishes in this part of the United Dioceses: Athboy, Athlone, Castlepollard (Rathgraffe), Clara, Julianstown, Kells, Mullingar, Navan, Trim, and Tullamore (Kilbride). The dean is the Dean of Clonmacnoise.

=== In Kildare ===
The cathedral church of the former diocese is Kildare Cathedral. There are six parishes in this part of the United Dioceses: Clane, Clonsast (Clonbullogue), Mountmellick, Naas, Newbridge (Morristownbiller), and Portarlington St Paul (French Church). The dean is the Dean of Kildare.

== List of bishops of Meath and Kildare ==
Bishops of Meath and Kildare
From	Until	Incumbent	Notes
1976	1985	Donald Caird	Translated from Limerick, Ardfert and Aghadoe; elected 9 September and confirmed 14 September 1976; translated to Dublin in 1985.
1985	1996	Walton Empey	Translated from Limerick and Killaloe in 1985; subsequently translated to Dublin in 1996.
1996	2012	Richard Clarke	Elected and consecrated in 1996; translated to Armagh 15 December 2012.
2013		Pat Storey	Appointment by the House of Bishops announced 20 September 2013; consecrated in Dublin 30 November 2013.

== See also ==
- List of Anglican dioceses in the United Kingdom and Ireland
- Roman Catholic Diocese of Meath
- Roman Catholic Diocese of Kildare and Leighlin
