= O'Conor dynasty =

Irish royal family

O'Conor Ó Conchobhair
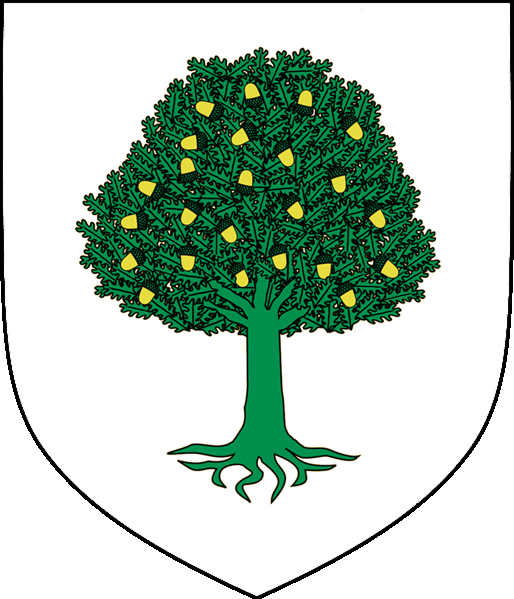
- Parent house: Uí Briúin Ai / Síl Muiredaig
- Country: Ireland
- Founded: AD 872
- Founder: Conchobar mac Taidg Mór
- Current head: Desmond O'Conor, O'Conor Don
- Final ruler: Fedlim Geancach Ó Conchobair
- Titles: High King of Ireland; King of Connacht; Prince of Connacht; O'Conor Don; O'Conor Roe; O'Conor Sligo; O'Conor Breifne
- Estates: Clonalis House; Ballintober Castle; Roscommon Castle; Bellanagare Castle; Hermitage House

The O'Conor dynasty (Middle Irish: Ó Conchobhair; Modern Irish: Ó Conchúir) are an Irish noble dynasty and formerly one of the most influential and distinguished royal dynasties in Ireland. The O'Conor family held the throne of the Kingdom of Connacht up until 1475. Having ruled it on and off since 967, they ruled continuously from 1102 to 1475. Moreover, the O'Conor parent house the Uí Briúin and Síol Muireadaigh ruled Connacht on many occasions – but not continuously – between 482 and 956. The house of O'Conor also produced two High Kings of Ireland, Tairrdelbach Ua Conchobair and his son Ruaidrí Ua Conchobair, the last High King of Ireland. The family seat is Clonalis House outside Castlerea in County Roscommon.

The current O'Conor Don is Desmond O'Conor (b. 22 September 1938) who lives in Rotherfield, East Sussex in England.

== History ==
The Ó Conor Don is the head of a lineage which provided about one hundred Kings of Connacht, thirty Chiefs of the Name and two High Kings of Ireland, Tairrdelbach Ua Conchobair (1088–1156), and his son Ruaidrí Ua Conchobair (c. 1115–1198), the last High King.

During the late 14th century, the Ó Conor dynasty was grouped into two main divisions, one led by Toirdhealbhach Óg Donn Ó Conchobair, the other by Felim MacAedh Ó Conchobair. From these descended the families of Ó Conchubhair Donn anglicized as O'Conor Don and Ó Conchubhair Ruadh anglicized as O'Conor Roe (now extinct). The O'Conor family like all Gaelic Nobility followed Brehon law system up until the 16th century. Therefore, they did not follow primogeniture. The Kings, or Chiefs of the O'Conor family would be elected by a close kinship group. This did frequently result in bitter feuds and lead to civil wars within the Kingdom, therefore at times dramatically weakening the family's power in Connacht and in Ireland.

== Descent from Conchobar mac Tadg, King of Connacht ==
- Conchobar mac Tadg, King of Connacht and Eponym of the O'Conor's of Connacht.
  - Cathal mac Conchobar mac Taidg O’Conor, King of Connacht.
    - Dub Chablaigh O’Conor; she was a wife of Brian Boru.
    - Tadg in Eich Gil O’Conor, King of Connacht.
      - Áed in Gai Bernaig O’Conor, King of Connacht.
        - Tadhg O’Conor (Slain in 1062).
        - Ruaidrī na Saide Buide O’Conor, King of Connacht.
          - Niall O'Conor (Killed in 1093).
          - Tadc O’Conor, King of Connacht (Killed in 1097).
          - Conchobhar O’Conor (Murdered in 1103).
          - Domnall O’Conor, King of Connacht
          - Turlough Mor O'Conor, High King of Ireland and King of Connacht; He had six wives and 26 children among them were:
            - Conchobar O’Conor, King of Dublin & King of Meath (Killed at Bealach Muine-na-Siride, by Ua Dubhlaich, lord of Feara-Tulach in 1144)
              - Brian Mainech O’Conor, (Killed at the battle of Ath na caisberna in 1159)
            - Aedh “Dall” O’Conor
              - Tommaltach O’Conor, Archbishop of Armagh (d. 1201)
            - Ruaidhri O’Conor, Last High King of Ireland (d. 1198). He had at least 15 children among them were:
              - Aed mac Ruaidrí O’Conor
              - Rose O’Conor who married Hugh de Lacy, Lord of Meath
              - Conchobar Maenmaige O’Conor, King of Connacht (died in 1202).
                - Cathal Carragh O’Conor, King of Connacht (died 1202).
                  - Melaghlin O’Conor (died 1212).
                - Mathghamhain mac Conchobar Maenmaige O’Conor (He was slain by Donnell O’More and the men of Leix in 1196).
                  - Muirchertach Tethbhach O’Conor (Killed in 1204).
                  - Donnchadh Conallagh O’Conor (Killed in 1207).
                  - Tadhg mac Conchobar Maenmaige O’Conor.
                  - Mael Seachlainn mac Conchobar Maenmaige O’Conor (He was slain in 1219).
                  - Aodh mac Conchobar Maenmaige O’Conor (He was an Irish Crusader and died on his return from the Holy Land in 1224).
              - Diarmait O’Conor (Slain by Thomas Mac Uchtraigh as he was coming from Insi-Gall, whilst collecting a fleet for the purpose of acquiring the sovereignty of Connacht in 1221)
                - Diarmait O’Conor (died 1237).
                - Donnchad O’Conor (died 1237).
                - Muirchertach O’Conor (died 1237).
                - Cormac O’Conor.
              - Muirghis Cananach O’Conor. Monk and noted Poet and Singer. (died in 1224)
              - Aedh mac Ruaidri O’Conor, King of Connacht
                - Conchobar O’Conor
              - Toirdhealbhach mac Ruaidhrí O’Conor, King of Connacht
                - Bean Mhídhe O’Conor married Maol Mhuire an Sparáin, son of Murchadh Mac Suibhne
                - Conchobar Buide O’Conor
                - Brian O’Conor
            - Cathal Crobhdearg O'Conor, King of Connacht
              - Aedh O'Conor, King of Connacht
                - Cathal Dall O'Conor
                  - Aedh MacCathal O'Conor
                - Ruaidri MacAedh O'Conor
                  - Eoghan mac Ruaidri Ó Conor
                    - Aedh O'Conor, King of Connacht
                      - Turlough O'Conor, King of Connacht (Ancestor of the O'Conor Don Sept)
                      - Felim O'Conor, King of Connacht (Ancestor of the O'Conor Roe Sept)
              - Felim O'Conor, King of Connacht
                - Aedh O'Conor, King of Connacht
                - Aedh Muimnech O'Conor, King of Connacht
            - Donnell Mor Mideach O’Conor
            - Brian Breifne O'Conor
            - Brian Luighnech O'Conor, Lord of Cairbre Drom Cliabh (Ancestor of The O’Conor Sligo).
            - Maghnus O'Conor
              - Muircheartach O'Conor
              - Diarmaid O'Conor
                - Manus O'Conor (Killed in 1237)
                - Conchobhair O'Conor (Killed in 1279)
              - Domnall O'Conor
              - Riocaird O'Conor
            - Mór O’Conor; married Tairdelbach O’Brian, King of Munster; Among their children was Domnall Mór O’Brien, King of Thomond.
            - Murtogh Moynagh O'Conor (His line was known as Clan Murtagh O'Conor).
              - Maghnus mac Muirchertaig O'Conor.
              - Conchobair Ruadh mac Muirchertaig O’Conor.
                - Cathal O’Conor, Abbot of Lough Key.
                - Magnus O'Conor, King of Connacht.
              - Tuathal mac Muirchertaig O’Conor.
              - Toirrdelbach mac Muirchertaig.
            - Máel Ísa O’Conor, Abbot of Roscommon.
    - Brian O'Conor
    - Conchobor O’Conor
    - Tadhg O'Conor

== The O'Conor Don line ==
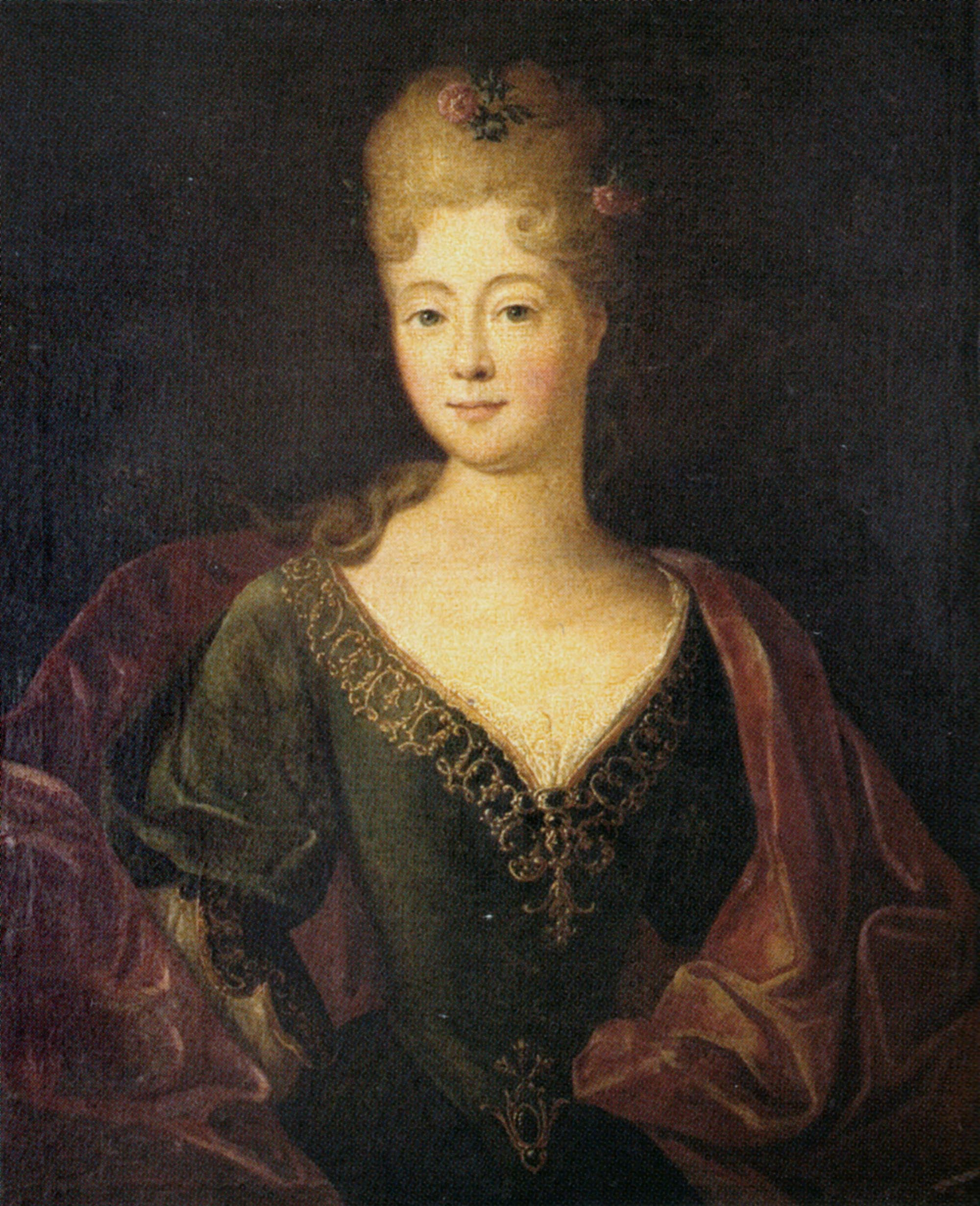
Isabella, Countess O'Rourke (née MacDonagh), grandmother of Charles O'Conor of Ballinagare (1710–1791). After her husband's death in 1702 at the Battle of Luzzara, she became a lady-in-waiting to Mary of Modena, before retiring to the household of her son-in-law Denis (Just below).

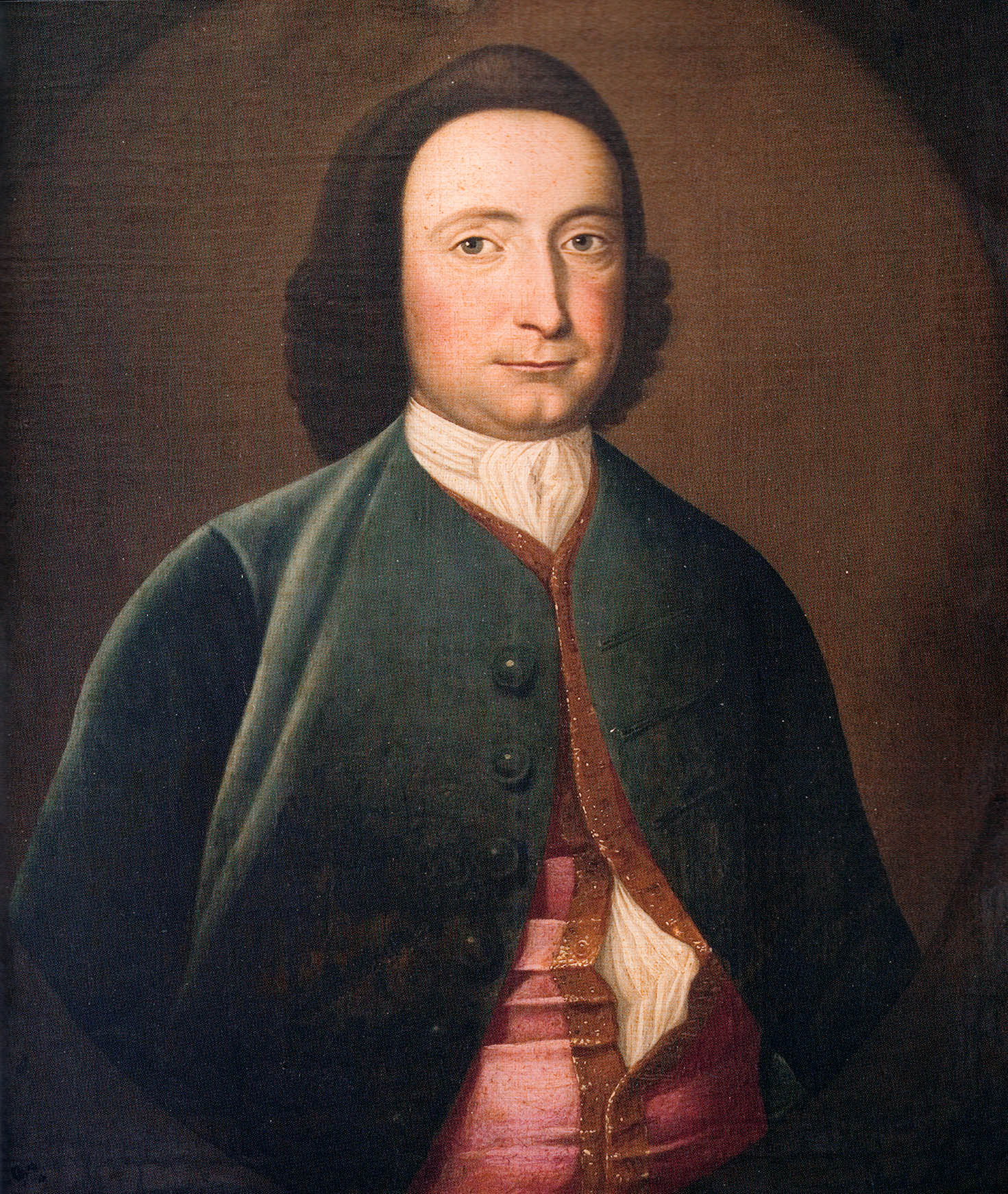
Denis O'Conor of Ballinagare (Donnchadh Liath) (b. 1674), Charles' father.

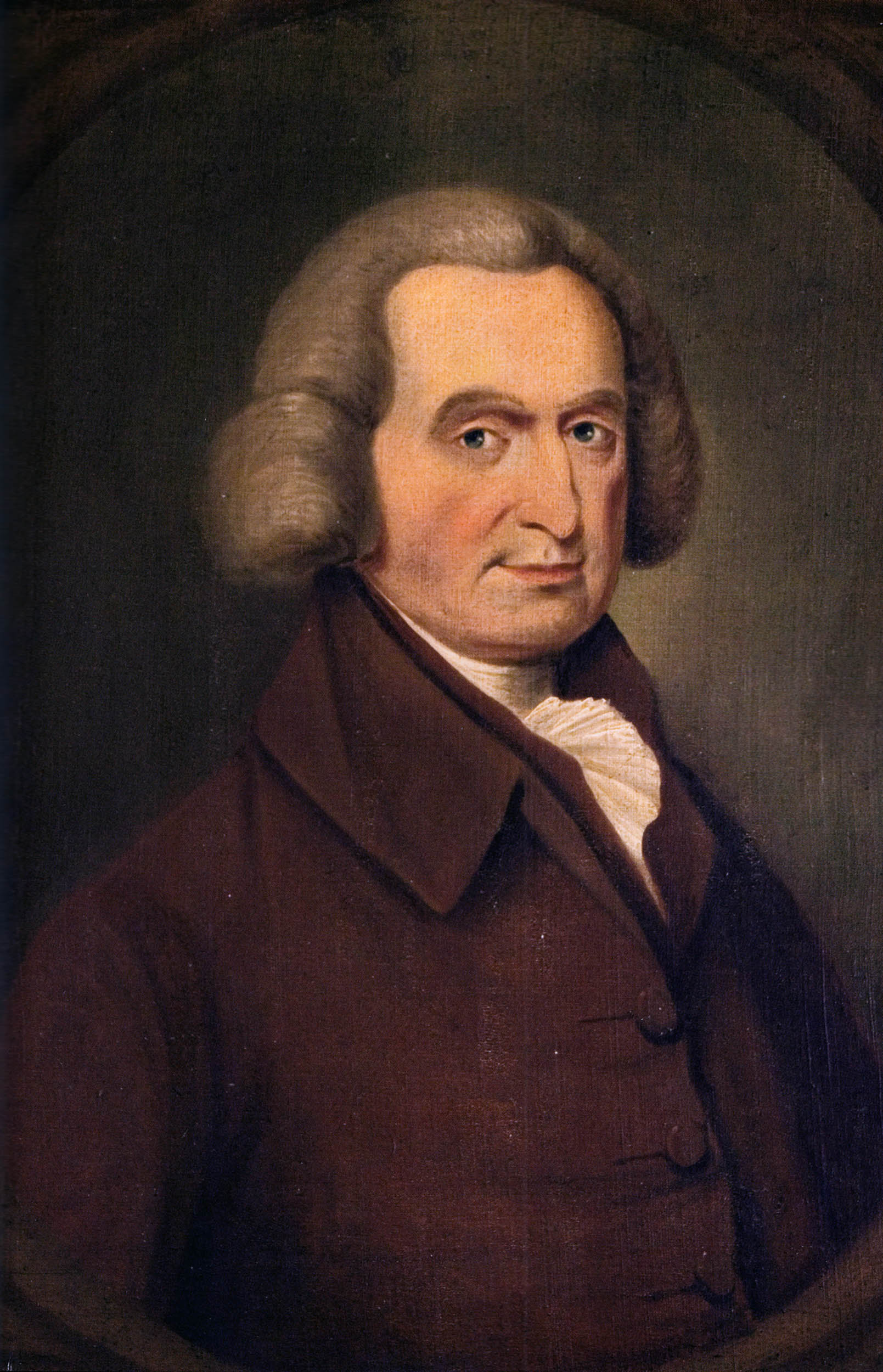
Charles O'Conor of Ballinagare (1710–1791), in middle age.

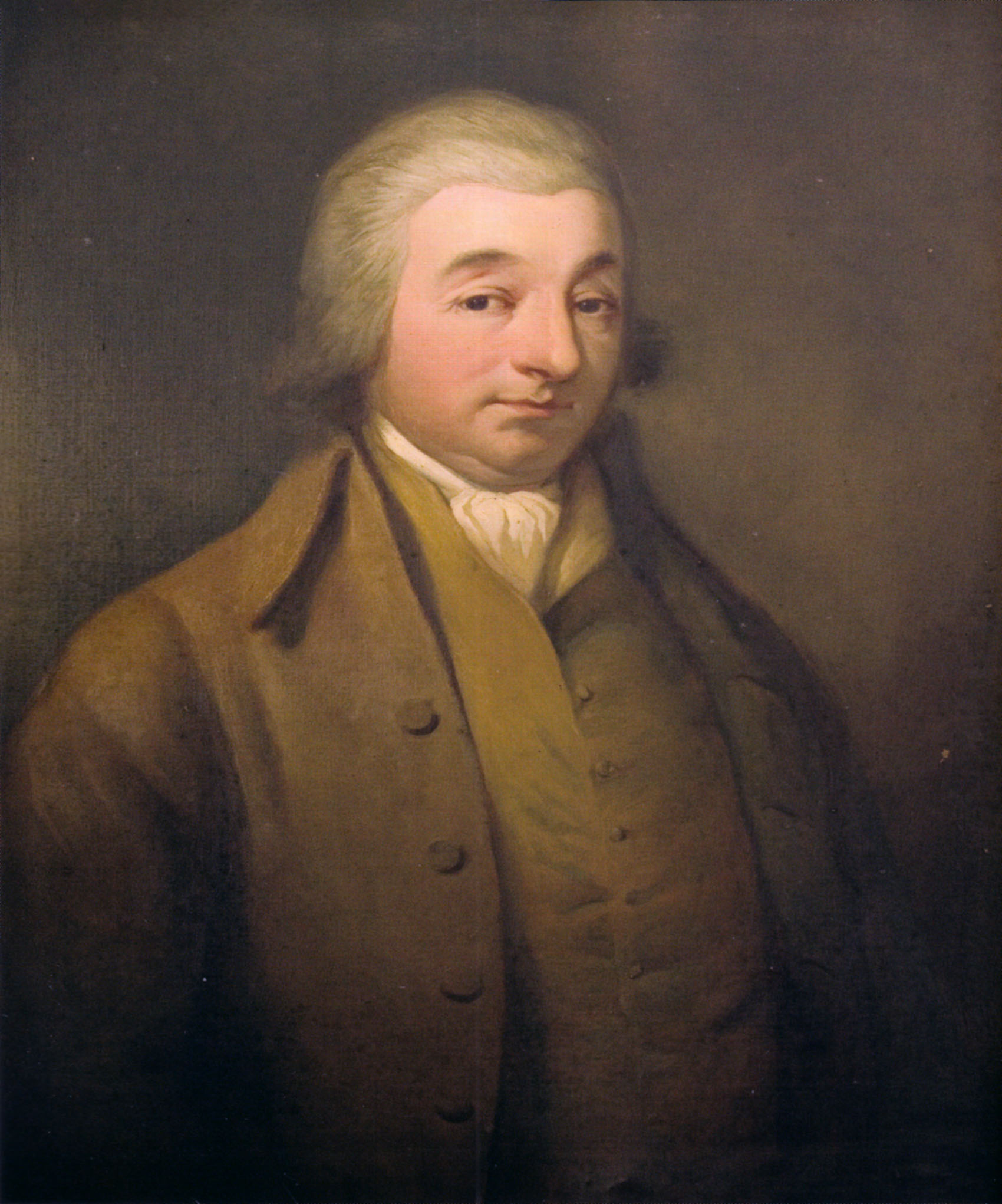
Denis O'Conor of Ballinagare (1732–1804), Charles' eldest son, in middle age.

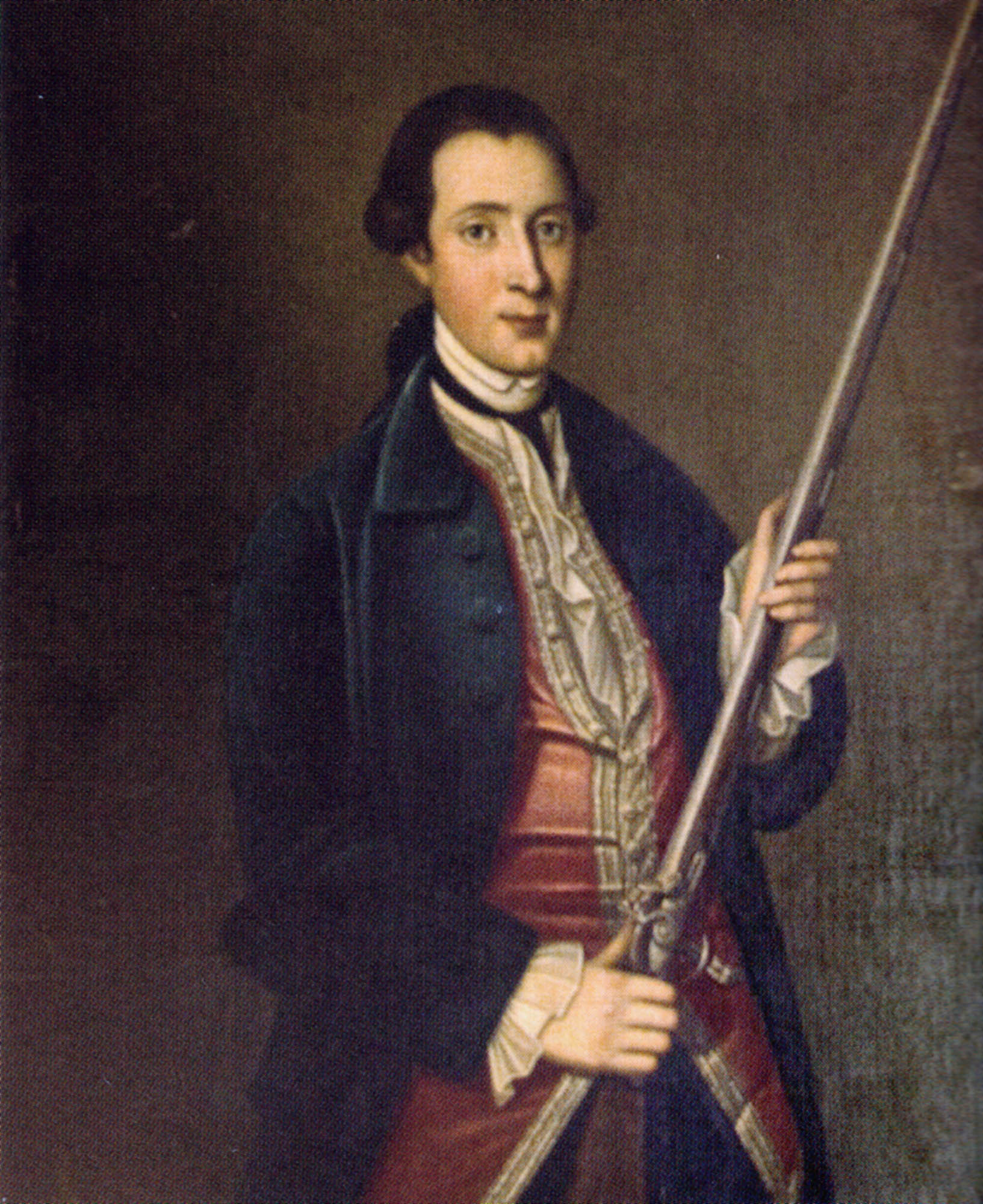
Charles O'Conor of Mount Allen (1736–1808) as a young man.

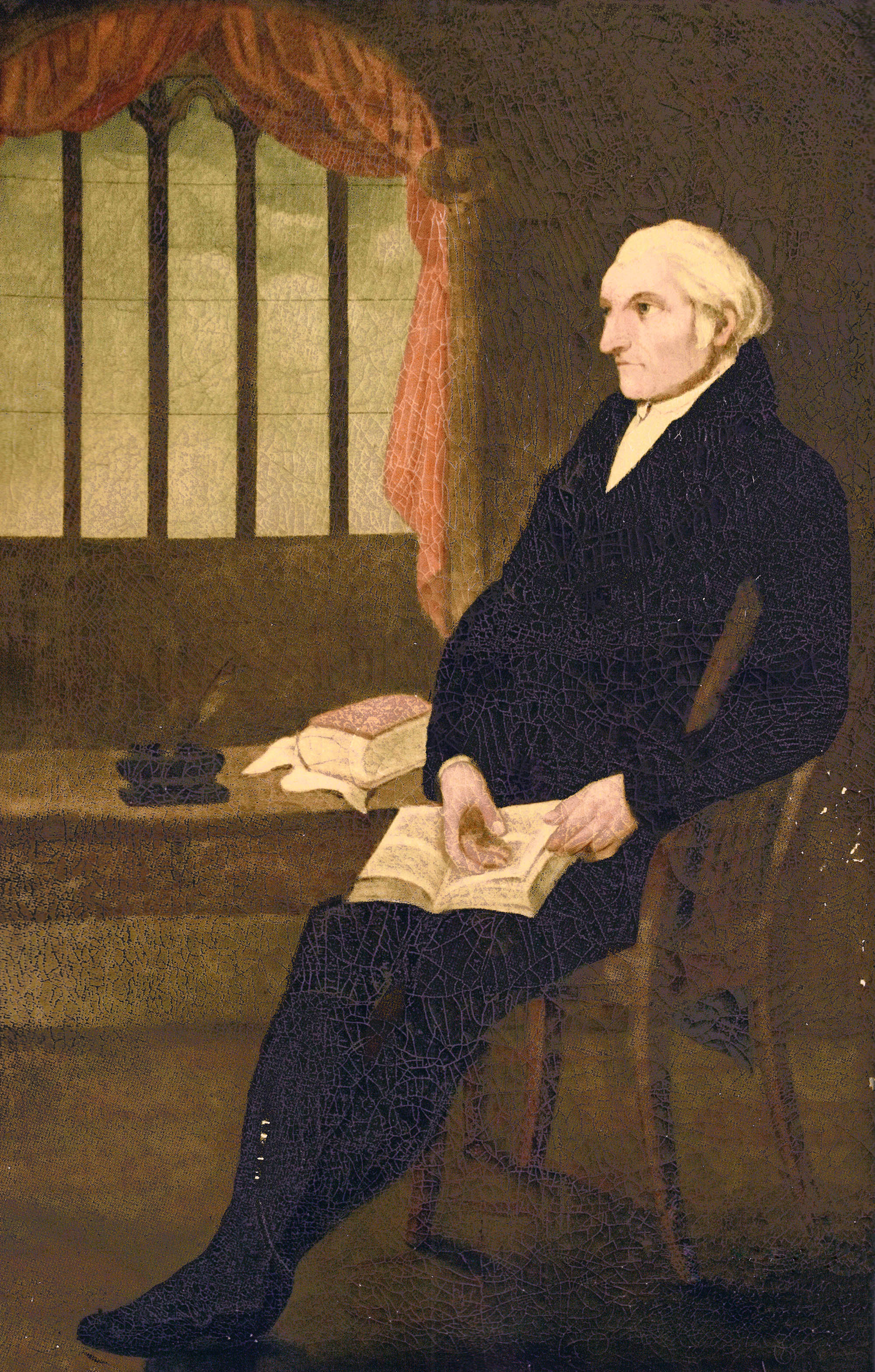
Revd Dr Charles O'Conor (1764–1828), grandson of Charles O'Conor of Ballinagare (1710-1791) who was also a historian of note but created controversy during his lifetime.

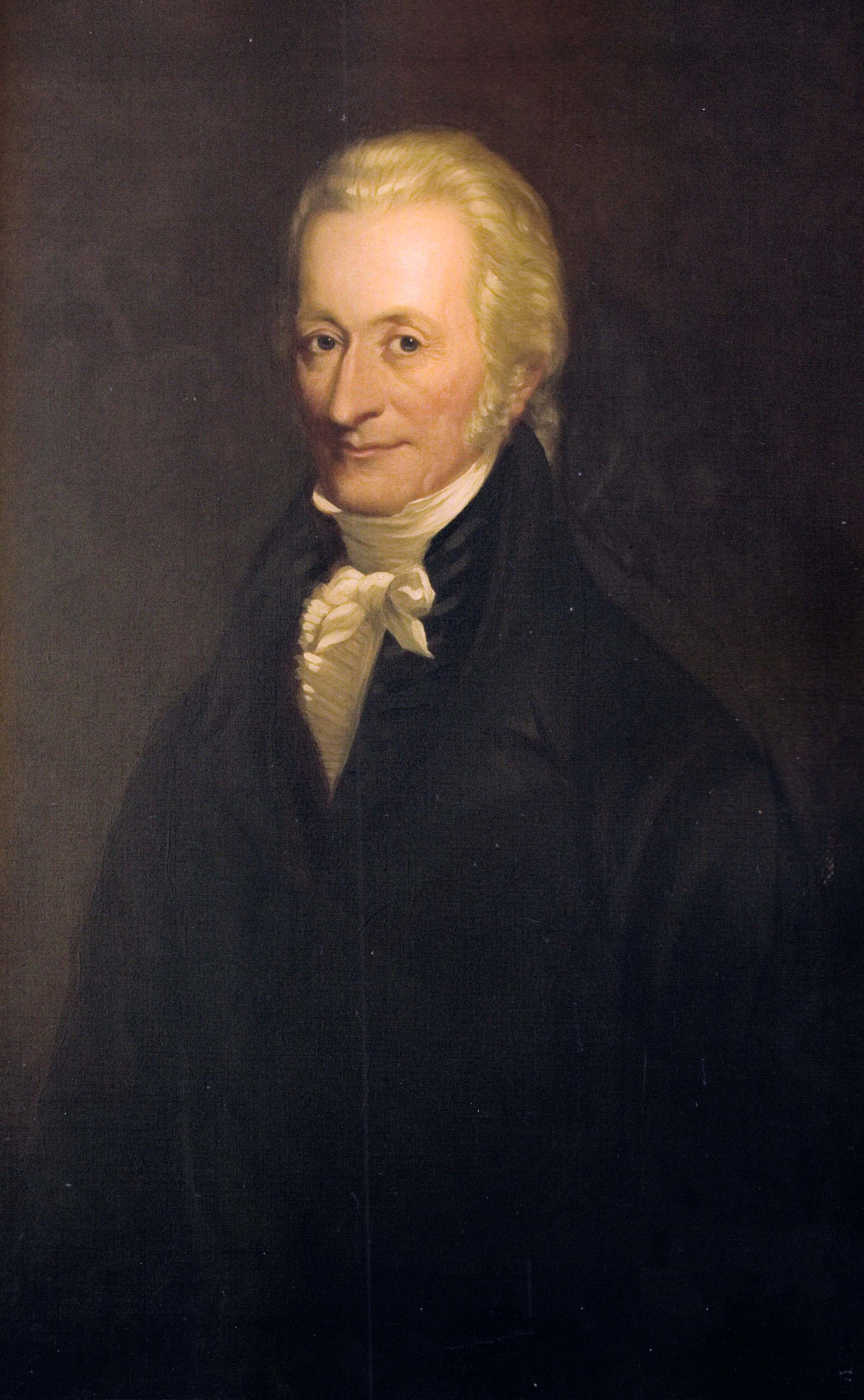
Owen O'Conor of Ballinagare. He purchased Clonalis estate in 1805 and inherited the O'Conor Don title in 1820. Owen moved his family and household to Clonalis in that year and left Ballinagare Castle. A Catholic emancipationist and close friend of Daniel O'Connell, he was the first elected Catholic Member of Parliament for Roscommon since the Patriot Parliament of 1689.

- Turlough O'Conor, King of Connacht
  - Aedh O'Conor, King of Connacht
    - Turlough O'Conor, King of Connacht
      - Aedh O'Conor, King of Connacht
        - Ruaidhri O'Conor
          - Turlough O'Conor
      - Felim Geanach O'Conor, The Last King of Connacht
        - Owen Ceach O'Conor, O'Conor Don
          - Carbery O'Conor, O'Conor Don
            - Dermot O'Conor, O'Conor Don
              - Sir Hugh O'Conor, O'Conor Don of Ballintubber Castle (1541-1632). Member of Parliament; married Mary O'Rourke daughter of Sir Sir Brian "Na Múrta" O'Rourke.
                - Calvach O'Conor, O'Conor Don of Ballintubber Castle (1584–1655); married Hon. Mary Bourke daughter of Tibbot na Long Bourke, 1st Viscount Mayo.
                  - Hugh O'Conor, O'Conor Don of Ballintubber Castle (1617–1669); married his first cousin Isabella Burke daughter of Ulick Burke, Esq of Castle Hackett, Co. Galway.
                    - Hugh O'Conor, O'Conor Don; died unmarried.
                  - Charles O'Conor, O'Conor Don; died unmarried.
                  - Eleanor O'Conor; married Edward O'Mulloy son of William "Mor" O'Mulloy, The O'Mulloy of Urtaheera
                - Hugh Og O'Conor of Castlerea; married Hon. Jane Dillon daughter of Theobald Dillon, 1st Viscount Dillon.
                  - General Daniel O'Conor of Castlerea; married Hon. Anne Bermingham daughter of Francis de Bermingham, 12th Baron Athenry. He served in the Spanish Army.
                    - Colonel Andrew O'Conor, O'Conor Don of Clonalis; married Honora Dowell daughter of Colonel Luke Dowell, Esq of Mantua House, Co. Roscommon.
                      - Daniel O'Conor, O'Conor Don; married Mary Ryan daughter of Captain Dominick Ryan of Dublin.
                        - Dominick O'Conor, O'Conor Don of Clonalis; married Catherine Lavinia O'Kelly daughter of Robert O'Kelly, Esq of Lisnaneane, Tulsk, Co. Roscommon, d.s.p.
                        - Alexander 'Sandy' O'Conor, O'Conor Don of Clonalis; died unmarried.
                        - Thomas O'Conor; died unmarried.
                        - Brigadier General Sir Hugh O'Conor; died unmarried in Mexico
                        - Jane O'Conor; eloped with her Protestant lover, William Eccles. She was the great-grandmother of Charlotte O'Conor Eccles.
                        - Elizabeth O'Conor; died unmarried.
                      - General Sir Thomas O'Conor. He was in the Irish Brigade; died unmarried.
                      - Roderick O'Conor; died young.
                      - Rev. Andrew O'Conor; Roman Catholic Priest.
                      - Eileen O'Conor; eloped with her lover, John O'Hanly of Kilgelfin, Co. Roscommon.
                    - Margaret O'Conor; married Francis Ryan Esq of Owney.
                  - Margaret O'Conor; married Teige O'Kelly son of Melaghlin O'Kelly Esq.
                - Ayles O'Conor; married Melaghlin O'Kelly Esq.
                - Cathal O'Conor of Bellanagare (1597–1634); married Anne O'Mulloy daughter of William "Mor" O'Mulloy, The O'Mulloy of Urtaheera.
                  - Major Owen O'Conor of Bellanagare (d. 1692); married Eleanor O'Ferrall daughter of Roger O'Ferrall, The O'Ferrall of Mornine Castle and the widow of Sir Oliver Tuite, 2nd Baronet of Sonna, Co. Westmeath.
                    - Mary O'Conor; married Richard Plunkett Esq
                    - Eleanor O'Conor; married Manus O'Cahan Esq
                  - Mary O'Conor; married John O'Gara son of Farrell O'Gara of Moygara, Co. Sligo; and were the parents of Sir Oliver O'Gara.
                  - Charles og O'Conor (d.1696); married Cecilia O'Flynn Daughter of Fiachra O'Flynn, The O'Flynn of Ballinlough, County Roscommon.
                    - Phelim O'Conor; died young
                    - Denis O'Conor of Bellanagare (b. 1674); married Mary O'Rourke daughter and heiress of Col. Tiernan O'Rourke, The O'Rourke (died in 1702 at the Battle of Luzzara) by his wife Isabella MacDonagh (see photo) daughter of Capt. Brian MacDonagh of Ballindoon Castle, Co. Sligo.
                      - Charles O'Conor of Bellanagre (1710–1791); married Catherine O'Hagan daughter of John O'Hagan Merchant of Boyle, County Roscommon.
                        - Denis O'Conor of Bellnagare (1732–1804); married Catherine Browne daughter of Martin Browne Esq of Cloonfad house, Co. Roscommon.
                          - Owen O'Conor, O'Conor Don of Clonalis and Bellanagare(1763–1831); married Jane Moore daughter of Edward Moore, eminent brewer of Mount Browne, Dublin. He inherited the O'Conor Don on the death of his distant cousin Alexander 'Sandy' O'Conor, O'Conor Don of Clonalis in 1820.
                            - Denis O'Conor, O'Conor Don (1794–1847); married his cousin Mary Blake daughter of Maj. Maurice Blake Esq of Towerhill house, Co. Mayo.
                              - Jane O'Conor; became a nun at Princethorpe Convent, Warwickshire.
                              - Kate O'Conor; became a nun at Princethorpe Convent, Warwickshire.
                              - Josephine O'Conor; became a nun at Princethorpe Convent, Warwickshire.
                              - Eugenia O'Conor; became a nun at Princethorpe Convent, Warwickshire.
                              - Dionysia O'Conor; became a nun at Princethorpe Convent, Warwickshire.
                              - Charles Owen O'Conor, O'Conor Don (1838–1906); married Georgina Perry daughter of Thomas Aloysius Perry Esq of Bitham house, Avon Dassett, Warwickshire, and had issue. Married secondly Ellen Letitia More-O'Ferrall daughter of John Lewis More-O'Ferrall, Esq of Lissard house, Co. Longford
                                - Denis Charles Joseph O'Conor, O'Conor Don(1860–1917); died unmarried.
                                - Owen Phelim O'Conor, O'Conor Don (1870–1943); married firstly Mary McLaughlin daughter of Francis Charles McLaughlin of Detroit, and had issue. He married secondly, his third cousin Gertrude Gwendoline O'Conor daughter of Charles Matthew O'Conor, Esq of Mount Druid house, Co. Roscommon, but had no issue.
                                  - Hélène Françoise Marie O'Conor; married firstly Denys Herbert George Tollemache son of Leone Sextus Tollemache and had issue. She married secondly Ronald William Perry and had issue.
                                - Charles Hugh O'Conor of Lucan House, Co. Dublin (1872–1939); married his stepmothers niece also named Ellen Letitia More-O'Ferrall daughter of Edward More-O'Ferrall.
                                  - Josephine Mary O'Conor; died unmarried.
                                  - Fearga Mary O'Conor; married Vincent Harold Nash son of Sir Vincent Nash of Limerick, and had issue.
                                  - Letitia Mary O'Conor; died unmarried.
                                  - Honoria Mary O'Conor; died unmarried.
                                  - Mary Ellen Julian O'Conor; married Sir Luke William Teeling, but had no issue.
                                  - Rev. Charles Denis Mary Joseph Anthony O'Conor, O'Conor Don(1906–1981). As he was a Jesuit Priest, the title was inherited by his second cousin Denis Armar O'Conor.
                                  - Gertrude Mia O'Conor; married G-Capt. Richard Rupert Nash son of Sir Vincent Nash of Limerick and had issue, including Pyres O'Conor-Nash, owner of Clonalis house.
                                  - Eva Mary O'Conor; married Capt. Maurice de Lacy Staunton son of Peter Maurice Staunton and had issue.
                                  - Helen Theresa O'Conor; married Malachi Sweetman and had issue.
                                  - Georgina Mary O'Conor; married Austin Cathal Barry and had issue.
                                - Roderick Joseph O'Conor (1872–1878)l died young.
                              - Denis Maurice O'Conor (1840–1883); married Ellen Isabella Kevill-Davies daughter of Rev. William Trevelyan Kevill-Davies, Esq of Croft Castle, Herefordshire.
                                - Charles William O'Conor (1878–1963); married Evelyn Lowry-Corry daughter of Admiral Hon. Armar Lowry-Corry (second son of Armar Lowry-Corry, 3rd Earl Belmore)
                                  - Denis Armar O'Conor, O'Conor Don (1912–2000). He inherited the title from his second cousin, the Rev. Charles O'Conor; he married firstly Elizabeth Marris daughter of Rev. Stanley Punsheon Marris, and 1 son. He married Secondly, Rosemary Jean O'Connell-Hewett daughter of Capt. James Pearce O'Connell-Hewett and had a daughter and 2 sons.
                                    - Desmond Roderic O'Conor, O'Conor Don (born 1938); married Virginia Anne Williams daughter of Sir Michael Sanigear Williams
                                      - Emma Joy O'Conor; married Mark Broke Leveson-Gower son of Major Charles Morrough Leveson-Gower, and had issue. They Divorced.
                                      - Phillip Hugh O'Conor (Born 1967); married Rebeccah Eagan daughter of Michael Francis Eagan of Australia.
                                        - Eochy Jack O'Conor (Born 1993); married Emma Forbes-Stocken.
                                        - Piers Montgomery O'Conor (Born 1995).
                                        - Adelaide O'Conor (born 1998).
                                        - Barley Josh O'Conor (Born 2006).
                                      - Denise Sarah O'Conor
                                    - Gael O'Conor; died young.
                                    - Kieran Denis O'Conor (Born 1958); married Karena Mary Morton daughter of Oscar Kenneth Roderick Morton of Dublin.
                                      - Eoin Roderic O'Conor (Born 1992); married Sussanah Madeleine Jane Cooke daughter of Michael John Alexander Cooke (Son of Alec Cooke, Baron Cooke of Islandreagh).
                                      - Hugh Armar O'Conor (Born 1996).
                                    - Rory Dominic O'Conor (Born 1963); married Emily Gleeson daughter of David Gleeson.
                                      - Evelyn O'Conor
                                      - Ruth O'Conor
                                  - Roderic Charles O'Conor (1913–1985); married Dorothy Roche daughter of William Chevers Roche
                                    - Fiona O'Conor; married His Honour Judge John Devaux QC, and had issue.
                                    - Brian O'Conor (Born 1957).
                            - Edward O'Conor. Agent to his father and then to his brother; married Honora Blake daughter of Maj. Maurice Blake Esq of Towerhill house, Co. Mayo.
                            - Jane O'Conor; died unmarried.
                            - Catherine O'Conor; married John Edward Mapother Esq of Killteevan house, Co. Roscommon
                          - Dr Charles O'Conor(1764–1828).
                          - Elizabeth Frances O'Conor; married her first cousin Hugh MacDermot, The MacDermot and had issue.
                          - Catherine O'Conor; married Charles Lyons Esq of Lyonstown house, Crosna, Co. Roscommon; and had issue.
                          - Mary O'Conor; married Con O'Donel, younger son of Constantine O'Donel, The O'Donnell; and had issue.
                          - Martin O'Conor; died young.
                          - Bridget O'Conor; died unmarried.
                          - Eleanor Anne O'Conor; died unmarried.
                          - Alicia O'Conor; married Dr. John Sheil of Ballyshannon and had issue.
                          - Denis O'Conor (b.1770); died unmarried in Jamaica, he was officer in the 13th Dragoons.
                          - Roderick O'Conor (b.1772); died unmarried.
                          - Matthew O'Conor of Mount Druid (1773–1844); married Priscilla Forbes.
                            - Denis O'Conor of Mount Druid (d.1862); married Margaret Emily Mahon Power daughter of Nicholas Mahon Power of Faithlegg house, Co. Waterford.
                              - Charles Matthew O'Conor of Mount Druid; married Alice Hale daughter of James Hale Esq of Temple View house, Easkey, Co. Sligo.
                                - Gertrude Gwendoline O'Conor; married her third cousin Owen Phelim O'Conor, O'Conor Don, but had no issue.
                                - Finola Mary O'Conor; died young.
                              - Gertrude O'Conor; married Hon. Charles Anthony Nugent, younger son of Anthony Francis Nugent, 9th Earl of Westmeath
                              - Eva O'Conor; died unmarried.
                              - Owen Denis O'Conor (b.1851); died unmarried.
                              - Denis A. O'Conor (b.1853); died unmarried.
                            - Arthur O'Conor of the Palace, Elphin (d.1870); married Catherine Blake daughter of Maurice Blake, Esq of Ballinafad house, Co. Mayo.
                              - Arthur Matthew O'Conor of the Palace, Elphin (b.1855).
                              - Charles Matthew O'Conor (b.1859).
                              - Major Maurice Matthew O'Conor of Inishfale Lodge, Lough Allen, Kilronan, Co. Roscommon; married Caroline Agnes Chisholm daughter of Archibald Chisholm and widow of Edmund Dwyer Gray. d.s.p.
                              - Mary O'Conor; died unmarried.
                              - Anne O'Conor; died unmarried.
                            - Martin O'Conor; died unmarried.
                            - Owen O'Conor; died unmarried.
                            - Matthew O'Conor; died unmarried.
                            - Priscilla O'Conor; married Edward Howley Esq of Belleek Castle, Co. Mayo, and had issue.
                            - Catherine O'Conor; died unmarried.
                            - Mary Jane O'Conor; died unmarried.
                            - Anna O'Conor; died unmarried.
                            - Margaret O'Conor; married William Murphy Esq of Kilbrew, Co. Meath; and had issue.
                        - Bridget O'Conor; married Myles MacDermot, The MacDermot; and had issue.
                        - Charles O'Conor of Mount Allen (1736–1808); married Mary Dillon daughter of John Dillon, Merchant of Francis Street, Dublin.
                          - Denis O'Conor; died unmarried in North America.
                          - Thomas O'Conor (d.1865).
                            - Charles O'Conor of New York; married Cornelia Livingston daughter of Francis Armstrong Livingston and widow of John Lemuel Hopkins McCrackan. D.S.P.
                            - Eliza Margaret O'Conor; married Christian Shear Sloane and among their descendants was T. O'Conor Sloane, T. O'Conor Sloane Jr. John Eyre Sloane, and T. O'Conor Sloane III.
                          - Catherine O'Conor; died unmarried in North America.
                      - Daniel O'Conor, he was an Officer in the Irish Brigade; he died unmarried.
                      - Hugh O'Conor; he converted to Church of Ireland, in order to seize his brother estates during the Penal Laws; he was fundamentally unsuccessful and converted back to the Catholic Faith; he married his third cousin Catherine O'Conor daughter of Owen O'Conor, Esq of Corrasduna house, Co. Roscommon.
                        - Denis O'Conor; died young.
                      - Rev. Roger O'Conor. He was a Roman Catholic priest.
                      - Rev. Matthew O'Conor. He was a Roman Catholic priest.
                      - Eleanor O'Conor; married Charles MacDermot Roe of Alderford house, Ballyfarnon, Co. Roscommon; and had issue.
                      - Catherine O'Conor; married Thomas Durkan.
                      - Mary O'Conor; married Thomas Higgins of Carroppaden; and had issue.
                      - Anne O'Conor
                    - Daniel O'Conor; died young.
                    - Bridget O'Conor; married Peter Conry Esq son of Fearfasa O'Mulconry; and had issue.
                    - Anne O'Conor; died unmarried.
                - Bryan Roe O'Conor; married Mary O'Connor daughter of Hugh Mergagh O'Connor of Castlerubay, Co. Roscommon
                  - Col. Roger O'Conor, he was a Colonel in the Irish Brigade; married Elizabeth O’Shaughnessey.
                    - Owen O'Conor of Corrasduna, Co. Roscommon (d.1766); he married Catherine MacDermot daughter of Edward MacDermot Esq of Emlagh, Co. Roscommon
                      - Roderic O'Conor of Ballychair, Co. Roscommon (d. 1781); married Mary Fallon daughter of John Fallon Esq of Cloonagh house, Co. Roscommon
                        - Bernard O'Conor; died unmarried.
                        - Thomas O'Conor(d.1832); Margaret O'Flanagan daughter of Peter O'Flanagan of Breugel Castle.
                          - Patrick O'Conor of Dun Dermott (d.1860); married Jane French daughter of Christopher French Esq of Frenchlawn house, Co. Roscommon
                            - Patrick Hugh O'Conor of Dundermot. (d.1877); died unmarried.
                            - Roderick Thomas O'Conor (1839-1858). Died in a shooting accident.
                            - Sir Nicholas Roderick O'Conor of Dun Dermott (1843–1908); married Minna Margaret Hope-Scott daughter of James Robert Hope-Scott
                              - Fearga Victoria Mary O'Conor; married Rear-Admiral Malcolm Raphael Joseph Constable-Maxwell-Scott; and had issue, including Sir Michael Fergus Constable-Maxwell-Scott, 13th Bt.
                              - Muriel Margaret Minna O'Conor; married Charles Joseph Nevile Esq of Wellingore Hall, Lincolnshire; and had issues, including Sir Henry Nicholas Nevile and Mildred Nevile.
                              - Eileen Winifred Madeleine O'Conor; married Prince Matila Ghyka, and had issue.
                          - Roderic O'Conorof Clunygrassin, Roscommon (1791–1879); married Mary Anne Moises daughter of Rev. William Bell Moises.
                            - Thomas Roderick O'Conor (b.1849); died unmarried.
                            - Julian Anne O'Conor; died unmarried.
                            - Emily O'Conor; died unmarried.
                          - Thomas Nicholas O'Conor (b.1793); died unmarried.
                          - Jane O'Conor; died unmarried.
                          - Fanny O'Conor; died unmarried.
                          - Bridget O'Conor; died unmarried.
                          - Maria O'Conor; married her first cousin Roderic Browne of Mount Hazel, Co. Galway.
                        - Jane O'Conor; married Andrew Browne, Esq of Mount Hazel house, Co. Galway and had issue. She was a great-grandmother of Edward Martyn.
                        - Patrick O'Conor; died unmarried.
                        - Elizabeth O'Conor; died unmarried.
                      - Major Thomas O'Conor of Miltown, he was in the Irish Brigade in France; when he returned to protect his property in converted to the Church of Ireland, however his children did not; married Mary Dillon daughter of Gerard Dillon Esq of Dillon's Grove, Co. Roscommon.
                        - Roderic O'Conor of Miltown; he married Bridget BrowneCapt. James Browne of Brownville
                          - Roderic O'Conor of Miltown (1794-1868); he married Cecilia McDonnell daughter of John McDonnell of Carnacon House, Co. Mayo
                            - Roderick Joseph O'Conor (1835-1893); he married Eleanor Browne daughter of Joseph Browne of Elm Grove House Co. Meath.
                              - Roderic Anthony O'Conor (1860-1940); he married his french Muse Renee Honta
                              - Joseph Owen Edward O'Conor; he died young.
                              - Ellen Mary O'Conor
                              - Cecilia O'Conor
                              - Mary Josephine O'Conor
                              - Elizabeth O'Conor she married firstly Captain Frederick W. Mallins and had issue. She married secondly Henry O'Connell Fitzsimon (Grandson of Christopher Fitzsimon and Ellen Fitzsimon daughter of Daniel O'Connell) and had issue.
                            - Alfred John O'Conor; he died unmarried.
                            - Eugene O'Conor; he married Elizabeth Ward Stone and died in Nelson, New Zealand in 1912 without issue.
                            - Cecilia O'Conor
                            - Ellen O'Conor
                          - Dillon O'Conor; he converted to the Church of Ireland; he married firstly to Eliza Hutton daughter of Henry Hutton and had issue. He married secondly Frideswida Lucinda Kellet daughter of James Kellet and had one son.
                          - Richard O'Conor; he converted to the Church of Ireland; he married Maryann Stewart daughter of George Frederick Stewart and had issue.
                          - Aylward O'Conor (1805–1877); converted to the Church of Ireland; he married Mary Blood daughter of Bindon Blood Esq.
                            - Aylward Owen Blood O'Conor (1842–1911); married his cousin Margaret Blood daughter of William Bindon Blood
                              - Captain Aylward Robert O'Conor (1872–1952); married Florence Isabel Newsom daughter of George Joshua Newsom.
                                - Lt.-Colonel Roderic Aylward O'Conor (1910–2003); married Lucy Margaret Rossetti daughter of Gabriel Arthur Madox Rosetti (son of William Michael Rossetti and Lucy Madox Brown)
                                  - Turlough Roderic Rosetti O'Conor (b. 1937); married Helen Allen.
                                    - Roderic Arthur Allen O'Conor (b. 1960)
                                    - John Gabriel Turlough O'Conor (b. 1964)
                              - Reverend William Owen O'Conor (1878–1919); died in Mesopotamia.
                            - Roderick O'Conor died unmarried.
                            - Bindon Blood O'Conor died unmarried
                            - William Frederick O'Conor died unmarried in New Zealand.
                            - Dillon O'Conor died unmarried.
                            - Elizabeth Anne O'Conor; died unmarried
                            - Ione O'Conor; died unmarried.
                        - Captain Owen O'Conor.
                      - Rev. Bernard O'Conor

== The O'Conor Roe line ==
- Felim MacHugh O'Conor, King of Connacht (died 1316)
  - Hugh O'Conor, O'Conor Roe(died 1368)
    - Owen Finn O'Conor (d.1362)
    - Felim Cleireach O'Conor
    - Turlough Roe O'Conor, O'Conor Roe (died 1425)
      - Teige O'Conor, O'Conor Roe(died 1464)
        - Turlough O'Conor(d.1452)
        - Dermot Roe O'Conor(d.1446)
          - Rory O'Conor(d.1468)
          - Teige O'Conor(d.1478)
        - Conor O'Conor(d.1466)
        - Felim Finn O'Conor, O'Conor Roe(died 1490)
          - Hugh O'Conor, O'Conor Roe (died 1503)
            - Carbry O'Conor, O'Conor Roe
          - Turlough O'Conor (d.1489)
            - Teige O'Conor (d.1502)
          - Con O'Conor (d.1493)
            - Brian O'Conor (d.1489)
            - Hugh O'Conor
        - Brian Duv O'Conor (d.1466)
          - Dermot O'Conor (d.1489)
      - Donagh Dubhshuileach O'Conor
      - Cathal Duv O'Conor
        - Rory O'Conor
          - Owen O'Conor (d.1466)
          - Hugh Duv O'Conor (d.1466)
        - Cathal Roe O'Conor (d.1451)
          - Teige Buidh O'Conor, O'Conor Roe (died 1534)
            - Calvagh O'Conor of Cloonakilly
              - Brian Ballagh O'Conor
              - Teige O'Conor
                - Hugh O'Conor
                  - Teige O'Conor (d.1693)
                  - Charles O'Conor (d.1692 in Germany)
            - Turlough O'Conor, O'Conor Roe
              - Hugh O'Conor, O'Conor Roe
              - Charles O'Conor, O'Conor Roe
                - Hugh O'Conor, O'Conor Roe
                  - Roger O'Conor, O'Conor Roe He was the Governor of Civitavecchia. He was Living in 1734. After his death the title of O'Conor Roe became extinct.
            - Roderic O'Conor (d.1552)
            - Teige O'Conor, O'Conor Roe (died 1592)
              - Teige Boy O'Conor (d.1588)
                - Charles O'Conor
              - Donagh O'Conor (d.1631)
                - Dermot O'Conor
        - Brian O'Conor
          - Teige O'Conor (d.1466)
          - Brian Oge O'Conor (d.1482)
      - Hugh O'Conor
        - Rory O'Conor
    - Brian Balagh O'Conor (d.1418)
      - Brian O'Conor (d.1487)
        - Teige O'Conor (d.1466)
        - Hugh O'Conor (d.1484)
      - Turlough Roe O'Conor (d.1452)
        - Turlough O'Conor (d.1478)
          - Rory O'Conor (d.1492)
        - Felim O'Conor (d.1468)
      - Donagh O'Conor(d.1478)
        - Teige O'Conor (d.1467)
        - Hugh Duv O'Conor (d.1467)
      - Rory O'Conor (d.1485)
        - Cathal O'Conor (d.1488)
        - Hugh O'Conor (d.1481)
          - Carbry O'Conor (d.1474)
            - Calvagh O'Conor (d.1497)
            - Teige Roe O'Conor (d.1497)

== Key figures ==
=== Kings of Connacht ===
- Conchobar mac Taidg Mór 872–882
- Áed mac Conchobair 882–888
- Tadg mac Conchobair 888–900
- Cathal mac Conchobair 900–925
- Tadg mac Cathail 925–956
- Conchobar mac Tadg 967–973
- Cathal mac Tadg d. 973
- Cathal mac Conchobar mac Taidg 973–1010
- Ruaidrí na Saide Buide 1087–1092
- Tadg mac Ruaidrí Ua Conchobair d. 1097
- Domnall Ua Conchobair 1102–1106
- Tairrdelbach Ua Conchobair 1106–1156
- Ruaidrí Ua Conchobair 1156–1186
- Conchobar Máenmaige Ua Conchobhair 1186–1189
- Cathal Carragh Ua Conchobhair 1190–1202
- Cathal Crobderg Ua Conchobair 1202–1224
- Aedh Ua Conchobair 1224–1228
- Aedh mac Ruaidri Ua Conchobair 1228–1233
- Felim mac Cathal Crobderg Ua Conchobair 1233–1256
- Aedh Ó Conchobair 1256–1274
- Murtogh Moynagh O'Conor 1274–1280
- Magnus O'Conor 1288–1293
- Hugh McOwen O'Conor 1293–1309
- Ruaidri Ó Conchobair 1309–1310
- Felim McHugh O'Connor 1310–1316
- Rory na-bhFeadh Ó Conchobair 1316–1317
- Toirdelbach Ó Conchobair first reign 1317–1318 second reign, 1324–1350
- Cathal mac Domhnall Ó Conchobair 1318–1324
- Hugh McHugh Breifne O'Conor 1342; died 1350
- Aedh mac Tairdelbach Ó Conchobair
- Ruaidri mac Tairdelbach Ó Conchobair 1368–1384

=== Chiefs of the name ===
- Toirdhealbhach Óg Donn mac Aodha meic Toirdhealbhaigh, d. 9 December 1406.
- Cathal mac Ruaidhri Ó Conchobhair Donn, d. 19 March 1439.
- Aodh mac Toirdhealbhaigh Óig Ó Conchobhair Donn, d. 15 May 1461.
- Feidhlimidh Geangcach mac Toirdhealbhaigh Óig Ó Conchobhair Donn, d. 1474 – last fully recognised King of Connacht.
- Tadhg mac Eoghain Ó Conchobhair Donn, d. 1476.
- Eoghan Caoch mac Feidhlimidh Gheangcaigh Ó Conchobhair Donn, d. 1485.
- Aodh Og mac Aodh Ó Conchobhair Donn
- Toirdhealbhach Óg mac Ruaidhri Ó Conchobhair Donn, d. 1503
- Conchobhar mac Eoghain Chaoich Ó Conchobhair Donn
- Cairbre mac Eoghain Chaoich Ó Conchobhair Donn, d. 1546
- Aodh mac Eoghain Chaoich Ó Conchobhair Donn, deposed 1550
- Diarmaid mac Cairbre Ó Conchobhair Donn, d. 1585
- Sir Hugh/Aedh Ó Conchobhair Donn, d. 1632
- An Calbhach mac Aedh Ó Conchobhair Donn, d. 1654 – popularly inaugurated king in 1643.
- Hugh Óg mac Aedh Ó Conchobhair Donn, d. 1662.
- Andrew O'Connor Don of Clonalis
- Dominick O'Connor Don of Clonalis, d. 1795
- Alexander O'Connor Don, d. 1820
- Owen O'Connor Don of Clonalis and Ballinagare, d.1831
- Denis O'Conor Don of Clonalis, 1794–1847
- Charles Owen O'Conor Don, 1838–1906
- Denis Charles O'Conor Don, 1869–1917
- Owen Phelim O'Conor Don, 1870–1943
- Fr. Charles O'Conor Don, 1906–1981
- Denis O'Conor Don, 1912 – 10 July 2000
- Desmond O'Conor Don (Former Chairman of the British-Chile Chamber of Commerce, former banker, resides in Sussex), b. 1938

=== Other notable members of the family ===
- Hugo Oconór (Spanish Army Officer and Governor of Texas)
- Thomas O'Connor (Writer)
- Charles O'Conor (Irish American Lawyer and Politician)
- Nicholas Roderick O'Conor (British diplomat)
- Roderic O'Conor (Artist)
- Charles O'Conor (historian) (Historian)
- Charles O'Conor (priest) (Priest and historical author)
- Matthew O'Conor (Historian)
- Denis O'Conor (Politician)
- Charles Owen O'Conor (Politician)
- Denis Maurice O'Conor (Politician)
- Denis O'Conor Don (Prior Chief of the Name O'Conor, died 10 July 2000)

== See also ==
- Ó Conchobhair Sligigh
- Clan Muircheartaigh Uí Conchobhair
- Gaelic nobility of Ireland
- Chief of the Name
- Irish nobility
- Irish royal families
- Chief Herald of Ireland
- O'Conor Sligo, a royal dynasty ruling the northern part of the Kingdom of Connacht
- Irish clans
