= List of state leaders in the 13th century =

This is a list of state leaders in the 13th century (1201–1300) AD, except for the many leaders within the Holy Roman Empire.

== Africa ==
=== Africa: Central ===
Chad

- Kanem Empire (Kanem–Bornu) (complete list) –

- Salmama I, Mai (1176–1203)
- Dunama Dabbalemi, Mai (1203–1242)
- Kaday I, Mai (1242–1270)
- Biri I, Mai (1270–1290)
- Ibrahim I, Mai (1290–1310)

=== Africa: East ===
Ethiopia

- Zagwe dynasty of Ethiopia (complete list) –

- Gebre Mesqel Lalibela, Negus (1189–1229)
- Na'akueto La'ab, Negus (mid 13th century)
- Yetbarak, Negus (mid 13th century)
- Mairari, Negus? (?–c.1300)
- Harbai, Negus? (13th century)

- Ethiopian Empire: Solomonic dynasty (complete list) –

- Yekuno Amlak, Emperor (1270–1285)
- Yagbe'u Seyon, Emperor (1285–1294)
- Senfa Ared IV, Emperor (1294–1295)
- Hezba Asgad, Emperor (1295–1296)
- Qedma Asgad, Emperor (1296–1297)
- Jin Asgad, Emperor (1297–1298)
- Saba Asgad, Emperor (1298–1299)
- Wedem Arad, Emperor (1299–1314)

Somalia

- Sultanate of Ifat: Walashma dynasty (complete list) –

- ʿUmar DunyaHuz, Sultan (1185–1228)
- ʿAli "Baziwi" ʿUmar, Sultan (1228–?)
- ḤaqqudDīn ʿUmar, Sultan (13th century)
- Ḥusein ʿUmar, Sultan (13th century)
- NasradDīn ʿUmar, Sultan (13th century)
- Mansur ʿAli, Sultan (13th century)
- JamaladDīn ʿAli, Sultan (13th century)
- Abūd JamaladDīn, Sultan (13th century)
- Zubēr Abūd, Sultan (13th–14th century)

- Warsangali –

- Garaad Dhidhin, King (1298–1311)

=== Africa: Northeast ===
Egypt

- Abbasid Caliphate, Cairo (complete list) –

- from Baghdad
- al-Mustansir, Caliph (1261–1262)
- al-Hakim I, Caliph (1262–1302)

- Mamluk Sultanate (complete list) –

Salihi Mamluks

- Aybak, Sultan (1250–1257)
- al-Mansur Ali, Sultan (1257–1259)
- Qutuz, Sultan (1259–1260)

Bahri dynasty

- Baibars, Sultan (1260–1277)
- Al-Said Barakah, Sultan (1277–1279)
- Solamish, Sultan (1279)
- Al-Mansur Qalawun, Sultan (1279–1290)
- Al-Ashraf Khalil, Sultan (1290–1293)
- Al-Nasir Muhammad, Sultan (1293–1294)
- Al-Adil Kitbugha, Sultan (1294–1296)
- Lajin, Sultan (1296–1299)
- Al-Nasir Muhammad, Sultan (1299–1309)

Sudan

- Makuria (complete list) –

- Murtashkar, King (c.1268)
- David, King (c.1268–1272)
- Shekanda, King (c.1276)
- Barak, King (c.1279)
- Semamun, King (c.1286–1287/8)
- nephew of Semamun, King (1287/8–1288)
- Semamun, King (c.1288–1289, c.1290–1295)
- nephew of David (Budamma), King (c.1289–1290)

=== Africa: Northcentral ===
Ifriqiya

- Hafsid dynasty (complete list) –

- Abu Zakariya, ruler (1229–1249)
- Muhammad I al-Mustansir, Khalif (1249–1277)
- Muse Mohammed, Khalif (1223–1270)
- Yahya II al-Watiq, Khalif (1277–1279)
- Ibrahim I, Khalif (1279–1283)
- Ibn Abi Umara, Khalif (1283–1284)
- Abu Hafs Umar I, Khalif (1284–1295)
- Muhammad I, Khalif (1295–1309)

=== Africa: Northwest ===
Morocco

- Almohad Caliphate of Morocco (complete list) –

- Muhammad al-Nasir, Caliph (1199–1213)
- Yusuf II, Caliph (1213–1224)
- Abd al-Wahid I, Caliph (1224)
- Abdallah al-Adil, Caliph (1224–1227)
- Yahya al-Mu'tasim, Caliph (1227–1229)
- Idris al-Ma'mun, Caliph (1229–1232)
- Abd al-Wahid II, Caliph (1232–1242)
- Said al-Muʿtadid, Caliph (1242–1248)

- Marinid dynasty of Morocco (complete list) –

- Abu Yahya ibn Abd al-Haqq, Sultan (1244–1258)
- Abu Yusuf Yaqub ibn Abd Al-Haqq, Sultan (1258–1286)
- Abu Yaqub Yusuf an-Nasr, Sultan (1286–1307)

=== Africa: West ===
Benin

- Kingdom of Benin (complete list) –

- Eweka I, Oba (1180–1246)
- Uwuakhuahen, Oba (1246–1250)
- Henmihen, Oba (1250–1260)
- Ewedo, Oba (1260–1274)
- Oguola, Oba (1274–1287)
- Edoni, Oba (1287–1292)
- Udagbedo, Oba (1292–1329)

Burkina Faso

- Mossi Kingdom of Nungu (complete list) –

- Diaba Lompo, Nunbado (1204–1248)
- Tidarpo, Nunbado (1248–1292)
- Untani, Nunbado (1292–1336)

Mali

- Mali Empire: Keita dynasty (complete list) –

- Sundiata Keita, Mansa (c.1235–c.1255)
- Uli I, Mansa (1255–1270)
- Wati, Mansa (1270–1274)
- Khalifa, Mansa (1274–1275)
- Abu Bakr I, Mansa (1275–1285)
- Sakoura, Mansa (1285–1300)
- Gao, Mansa (1300–1305)

Nigeria

- Ife Empire (complete list) -

- Obalufon Alayemore, Ooni (mid 13th c)

- Kingdom of Kano (complete list) –

- Naguji, King (1194–1247)
- Guguwa, King (1247–1290)
- Shekarau, King (1290–1307)

- Kingdom of Nri (complete list) –

- Eze Nri Buífè, King (1159–1259)
- Eze Nri Ọmalọ, King (1260–1299)
- Eze Nri Jiọfọ I, King (1300–1390)

== Americas ==
=== Americas: South ===
Incas

- Kingdom of Cusco (complete list) –

- Manco Cápac, Inca (c.1200–1230)
- Sinchi Roca, Inca (c.1230–1260)
- Lloque Yupanqui, Inca (c.1260–1290)
- Mayta Cápac, Inca (c.1290–1320)

== Asia ==
=== Asia: Central ===
Mongolia

- Khamag Mongol (complete list) –

- Genghis, Khan (1189–1206)

- Mongol Empire (complete list) –

- Genghis, Khan (1206–1227)
- Tolui, Regent (1227–1229)
- Ögedei, Khan (1229–1241)
- Töregene Khatun, Regent (1243–1246)
- Güyük, Khan (1246–1248)
- Oghul Qaimish, Regent (1248–1251)
- Möngke, Khan (1251–1259)
- Ariq Böke, Khan (1259–1264)
- Kublai, Khan (1260–1294), Emperor (1271–1294)
- Temür, Khan / Emperor (1294–1307)

Kazakhstan

- Chagatai Khanate (complete list) –

- Chagatai, Khan (1226–1242)
- Qara Hülëgü, Khan (1242–1246, 1252)
- Yesü Möngke, Khan (1246–1252)
- Mubarak Shah, Khan (1252–1260, 1266)
- Orghana, Khatun, Regent (1252–1260)
- Alghu, Khan (1260–1266)
- Baraq, Khan (1266–1270)
Nominal rulers under the Mongol Empire, 1270–1306
- Negübei, Khan (1270–c.1272)
- Buqa Temür, Khan (c.1272–1287)
- Duwa, Khan (1287–1307)

- Qara Khitai / Western Liao

- Yelü Zhilugu, Sovereign (1178–1211)
- Kuchlug, Sovereign (1211–1218)

Russia

- Golden Horde (complete list) –

- Batu Khan, Khan (1227–1255)
- Sartaq, Khan (1255–56)
- Ulaghchi, Khan (1257)
- Berke, Khan (1257–1266)
- Mengu-Timur, Khan (1266–1282)
- Tuda Mengu, Khan (1282–1287)
- Talabuga, Khan (1287–1291)
- Toqta, Khan (1291–1312)

- White Horde (complete list) –

- Orda, Khan (1226–1251)
- Qun Quran, Khan (1251–c.1280)

- Blue Horde (complete list) –

- Batu Khan, Khan (1227–1255)
- Sartaq, Khan (1255–56)
- Ulaghchi, Khan (1257)
- Berke, Khan (1257–1266)
- Mengu-Timur, Khan (1266–1282)
- Tuda Mengu, Khan (1282–1287)
- Talabuga, Khan (1287–1291)
- Toqta, Khan (1291–1312)

Siberia

- Khanate of Sibir (complete list) –

- Taibuga, Khan (1220–?)
- Khoja bin Taibugha, Khan (?)

Tibet

- Guge

- rNam lde btsan, King (12th/13th century)
- Nyi ma lde, King (12th/13th century)
- dGe 'bum, King (13th century)
- La ga, King (?–c.1260)
- Chos rgyal Grags pa, King (c.1260–1265)
- Grags pa lde, King (c.1265–1277)

=== Asia: East ===
China: Mongol Empire / Yuan dynasty

- Yuan dynasty (complete list) –

- Temür, Khan / Emperor (1294–1307)

China: Jin dynasty

- Jin dynasty –

- Zhangzong, Emperor (1189–1208)
- Wanyan Yongji, Emperor (1208–1213)
- Xuanzong, Emperor (1213–1224)
- Aizong, Emperor (1224–1234)
- Mo, Emperor (1234)

China: Yuan dynasty

- Yuan dynasty (complete list) –

- Temür, Khan / Emperor (1294–1307)

China: Other states and entities

- Dali Kingdom (complete list) –

- Duan Zhilian, Emperor (1200–1204)
- Duan Zhixiang, Emperor (1204–1238)
- Duàn Ziangxing, Emperor (1238–1251)
- Duan Xingzhi, Emperor (1251–1254)

- Western Xia –

- Huánzōng, Emperor (1193–1206)
- Xiāngzōng, Emperor (1206–1211)
- Shénzōng, Emperor (1211–1223)
- Xiànzōng, Emperor (1223–1226)
- Mòdì, Emperor (1226–1227)

China: Southern Song

- Song dynasty (complete list) –

- Ningzong, Emperor (1194–1224)
- Lizong, Emperor (1224–1264)
- Duzong, Emperor (1264–1274)
- Gong, Emperor (1275)
- Duanzong, Emperor (1276–1278)
- Bing, Emperor (1278–1279)

Japan

- Kamakura shogunate of Japan

- Emperors (complete list) –

- Tsuchimikado, Emperor (1198–1210)
- Juntoku, Emperor (1210–1221)
- Chūkyō, Emperor (1221)
- Go-Horikawa, Emperor (1221–1232)
- Shijō, Emperor (1232–1242)
- Go-Saga, Emperor (1242–1246)
- Go-Fukakusa, Emperor (1246–1260)
- Kameyama, Emperor (1260–1274)
- Go-Uda, Emperor (1274–1287)
- Fushimi, Emperor (1287–1298)
- Go-Fushimi, Emperor (1298–1301)

- Shōguns (complete list) –

- Minamoto no Yoriie, Shōgun (1202–1203)
- Minamoto no Sanetomo, Shōgun (1203–1219)
- Kujō Yoritsune, Shōgun (1226–1244)
- Kujō Yoritsugu, Shōgun (1244–1252)
- Prince Munetaka, Shōgun (1252–1266)
- Prince Koreyasu, Shōgun (1266–1289)
- Prince Hisaaki, Shōgun (1289–1308)

- Regent of the shogunate (complete list) –

- Hōjō Tokimasa, Shikken (1203–1205)
- Hōjō Yoshitoki, Shikken (1205–1224)
- Hōjō Yasutoki, Shikken (1224–1242)
- Hōjō Tsunetoki, Shikken (1242–1246)
- Hōjō Tokiyori, Shikken (1246–1256)
- Hōjō Tokimune, Shikken (1268–1284)
- Hōjō Sadatoki, Shikken (1284–1301)

- Ryukyu Kingdom

Shunten Dynasty –
- Shunten, Chief (1187–1237)
- Shunbajunki, Chief (1238–1248)
- Gihon, Chief (1249–1259)
Eiso Dynasty –
- Eiso, Chief (1260–1299)
- Taisei, Chief (1300–1308)

Korea

- Goryeo (complete list) –

- Sinjong, King (1197–1204)
- Huijong, King (1204–1211)
- Gangjong, King (1211–1213)
- Gojong, King (1213–1259)
- Wonjong, King (1259–1274)
- Chungnyeol, King (1274–1298, 1298–1308)
- Chungseon, King (1298, 1308–1313)

=== Asia: Southeast ===
Cambodia

- Khmer Empire (complete list) –

- Jayavarman VII, King (1181–1218)
- Indravarman II, King (1218–1243)
- Jayavarman VIII, King (1243–1295)
- Indravarman III, King (1295–1307)

Indonesia

Indonesia: Java

- Sunda Kingdom (complete list) –

- Prabu Guru Dharmasiksa, Maharaja (1175–1297)
- Rakeyan Saunggalah, Maharaja (1297–1303)

- Kediri Kingdom –

- Kertajaya, King (1200–1222)

Genealogy diagram of Rajasa Dynasty, the royal family of Singhasari and Majapahit. Rulers are highlighted with period of reign.

- Singhasari: Rajasa dynasty (complete list) –

- Ken Arok, King (1222–1227)
- Anusapati, King (1227–1248)
- Panji Tohjaya, King (1248)0
- Vishnuvardhana-Narasimhamurti, King (1248–1268)
- Kertanegara, King (1268–1292)

- Majapahit: Rajasa dynasty (complete list) –

- Raden Wijaya, King (1294–1309)

- Tuban –

- Kyai Arya Papringan, King (13th century)
- Raden Arya Rangga Lawe, King (c.1300)

- Blambangan Kingdom (complete list) –

- Aria Wiraraja, King (1293–?)

Indonesia: Sumatra

- Dharmasraya: Mauli dynasty (complete list) –

- Tribhuwanaraja, King (c.1286)
- Akarendrawarman, King (c.1300)

- Samudera Pasai Sultanate (complete list) –

- Malikussaleh, Sultan (1267–1297)
- Al-Malik azh-Zhahir I, Sultan (1297–1326)

Indonesia: Sulawesi

- Luwu –

- Batara Guru, Datu (13th century)
- Batara Lattu’, Datu (1250s–1260s)
- Simpurusiang, Datu (1268–1293)
- Anakaji, Datu (1293–1330)

Indonesia: Lesser Sunda Islands

- Bali Kingdom: Jaya dynasty (complete list) –

- Arjayadengjayaketana, Queen (fl.1200)
- Haji Ekajayalancana, King (co-regent fl.1200)
- Bhatara Guru Śri Adikuntiketana, King (fl.1204)
- Adidewalancana, King (fl.1260)
- unknown Queen (?–1284)

Indonesia: Maluku Islands

- Sultanate of Ternate (complete list) –

- Baab Mashur Malamo, King (1257–1277)
- Poit/ Jamin Qadrat, King (1277–1284)
- Komala 'Abu Said/ Siale, King (1284–1298)
- Bakuku/ Kalabata, King (1298–1304)

Malaysia: Peninsular

- Kedah Sultanate (complete list) –

- Mu'adzam Shah, Sultan, (1179–1202)
- Muhammad Shah, Sultan, (1202–1237)
- Muzzil Shah, Sultan, (1237–1280)
- Mahmud Shah I, Sultan, (1280–1321)

- Kelantan Sultanate: Jambi dynasty (complete list) –

- Sang Tawal, Raja (1267–1339)

Myanmar / Burma

- Pagan Kingdom (complete list) –

- Narapatisithu (Sithu II), King (1174–1211)
- Htilominlo, King (1211–1235)
- Naratheinga Uzana, Regent (c.1231–1235)
- Kyaswa, King (1235–1251)
- Uzana, King (1251–1256)
- Narathihapate, King (1256–1287)
- Kyawswa, Mongol vassal King (1287–1297)

- Myinsaing Kingdom (complete list) –

- Athinkhaya, Co-Regent (1297–1310)
- Yazathingyan, Co-Regent (1297–1313)
- Thihathu, Co-Regent of Myinsaing (1297–1313), King of Myinsaing–Pinya (1313–1325)

Philippines

- Lupah Sug (complete list) –

- Sipad the Older, Rajah (13th century)
- Sipad the Younger, Rajah (c.1280)

- Madja-as (complete list) –

- Puti, Datu
- Sumakwel, Datu
- Bangkaya, Datu (13th century)
- Paiburong, Datu (13th/14th century)

Singapore

- Kingdom of Singapura –

- Sang Nila Utama, Raja (1299–1347)

Thailand

- Ngoenyang (complete list) –

- Lao Ngoen Rueang, King (1192–early 13th century)
- Lao Sin, King (early 13th century)
- Lao Ming, King (early 13th century)
- Lao Mueang, King (mid 13th century)
- Lao Meng, King (mid 13th century)
- Mangrai, King of Ngoenyang (1261–1292), King of Lan Na (1292–1311)

- Lan Na (complete list) –

- Mangrai, King of Ngoenyang (1261–1292), King of Lan Na (1292–1311)

- Hariphunchai (complete list) –

- Phanton, King (13th century)
- Atana, King (13th century)
- Havam, King (13th century)
- Trangal, King (13th century)
- Yotta, King (13th century)
- Yip, King (13th century–1292)

- Rajahnate of Cebu –

- Lumay, Rajah (c.13th century)

- Sukhothai Kingdom (complete list) –

- Si Inthrathit, King (1238–1270)
- Ban Mueang, King (1270–1271)
- Ram Khamhaeng, King (1279–1298)
- Loe Thai, King (1298–1323)

Vietnam

- Champa (complete list) –

- Vidyanandana, (Khmer vassal) King (1190–1203)
- Cam Bốt thuộc, King (1203–1220)
- Jaya Paramesvaravarman II, King (1220–c.1252)
- Jaya Indravarman VI, King (c.1252–1257)
- Indravarman V, King (1257–1288)
- Chế Mân, King (1288–1307)

- Đại Việt: Later Lý dynasty (complete list) –

- Lý Cao Tông, Emperor (1176–1210)
- Lý Thẩm, Emperor (1209–1209)
- Lý Huệ Tông, Emperor (1211–1224)
- Lý Nguyên Vương, Emperor (1214–1216)
- Lý Chiêu Hoàng, Emperor (1224–1225)

- Đại Việt: Trần dynasty (complete list) –

- Trần Thái Tông, Emperor (1225–1258)
- Trần Thánh Tông, Emperor (1258–1278)
- Trần Nhân Tông, Emperor (1279–1293)
- Trần Anh Tông, Emperor (1293–1314)

=== Asia: South ===
Afghanistan

- Ghurid dynasty (complete list) –

- Ghiyath al-Din Muhammad, Malik (1163–1203)
- Muhammad of Ghor, Malik (1172–1206)
- Ghiyath al-Din Mahmud, Malik (1206–1212)
- Baha al-Din Sam III, Malik (1212–1213)
- Ala al-Din Atsiz, Malik (1213–1214)
- Ala al-Din Ali, Malik (1214–1215)

Northeast

- Ahom kingdom (complete list) –

- Sukaphaa, King (1228–1268)
- Suteuphaa, King (1268–1281)
- Subinphaa, King (1281–1293)
- Sukhaangphaa, King (1293–1332)

- Chutia Kingdom (complete list) –

- Birpal, King (1187–1224)
- Ratnadhwajpal, King (1224–1250)
- Vijayadhwajpal, King (1250–1278)
- Vikramadhwajpal, King (1278–1302)

- Kamata Kingdom (complete list) –

- Sandhya, King (1228–1260)
- Sindhu Rai, King (1260–1285)
- Rup Narayan, King (1285–1300)
- Singhadhwaj, King (1300–1305)

- Mallabhum (complete list) –

- Ram Malla, King (1185–1209)
- Bhim Malla, King (1240–1253)
- Prithwi Malla, King (1295–1319)

- Kingdom of Manipur (complete list) –

- Thayanthapa, King (1195–1231)
- Chingthang Lanthapa, King (1231–1242)
- Thingpai Shelhongpa, King (1242–1247)
- Pulanthapa, King (1247–1263)
- Khumompa, King (1263–1278)
- Moilampa, King (1278–1302)

Burma

- Kengtung (complete list) –

- Mang Kun, Saopha (mid-13th century)
- Mang Kyin, Saopha (1267–1273)
- Marquess of Kengtung, Saopha (1273–1284)
- Sao Nannan, Saopha (1284–1317)

India

- Deva dynasty (complete list) –

- Madhusudanadeva, King
- Vasudeva, King
- Damodaradeva, King (1231–1243)
- Dasharathadeva, King (1260–1268)

- Sena dynasty (complete list) –

- Lakshmana Sena, King (1179–1206)
- Vishvarupa Sena, King (1206–1225)
- Keshava Sena, King (1225–1230)

- Amber Kingdom (complete list) –

- Rajdeo, King (1179–1216)
- Kilhan, King (1216–1276)
- Kuntal, King (1276–1317)

- Chandelas of Jejakabhukti (complete list) –

- Paramardi-Deva, King (c.1165–1203)
- Trailokya-Varman, King (c.1203–1245)
- Vira-Varman, King (c.1245–1285)
- Bhoja-Varman, King (c.1285–1288)
- Hammira-Varman, King (c.1288–1311)

- Chaulukya dynasty of Gujarat (complete list) –

- Bhima II, King (1177–1240)
- Tribhuvanapala, King (1240–1244)

- Chera Perumals of Makotai (complete list) –

- Vira Manikantha Rama Varma Tiruvadi, King (1195–?)
- Vira Rama Kerala Varma Tiruvadi, King (1209–1214)
- Vira Ravi Kerala Varma Tiruvadi, King (1214–1240)
- Vira Padmanabha Martanda Varma Tiruvadi, King (1240–1252)
- Ravi Varma, King (1299–1313)

- Chola dynasty (complete list) –

- Kulothunga Chola III, King (1178–1218)
- Rajaraja Chola III, King (1218–1246)
- Rajendra Chola III, King (1246–1280)

- Chahamanas of Shakambhari (complete list) –

- Vijayasimha, King (1188–1210)
- Trailokya-malla, King (1210s)

- Delhi Sultanate: Mamluk Sultanate (complete list) –

- Qutb-ud-din Aibak, Sultan (1206–1210)
- Aram Shah, Sultan (1210–1211)
- Shams-ud-din Iltutmish, Sultan (1211–1236)
- Rukn-ud-din Firuz, Sultan (1236)
- Raziyyat ud din Sultana, Sultan (1236–1240)
- Muiz-ud-din Bahram, Sultan (1240–1242)
- Ala-ud-din Masud, Sultan (1242–1246)
- Nasir-ud-din Mahmud, Sultan (1246–1266)
- Ghiyas-ud-din Balban, Sultan (1266–1286)
- Muiz-ud-din Qaiqabad, Sultan (1286–1290)
- Shamsuddin Kayumars, Sultan (1290)

- Delhi Sultanate: Khalji dynasty (complete list) –

- Jalal ud din Firuz Khilji, Sultan (1290–1296)
- Alauddin Khilji, Sultan (1296–1316)

- Eastern Ganga dynasty (complete list) –

- Rajaraja Deva III, King (1198–1211)
- Ananga Bhima Deva III, King (1211–1238)
- Narasimha Deva I, King (1238–1264)
- Bhanu Deva I, King (1264–1279)
- Narasimha Deva II, King (1279–1306)

- Garhwal Kingdom (complete list) –

- Lakhan Dev, King (1197–1220)
- Anand Pal II, King (1220–1241)
- Purva Dev, King (1241–1260)
- Abhay Dev, King (1260–1267)
- Jayaram Dev, King (1267–1290)
- Asal Dev, King (1290–1299)
- Jagat Pal, King (1299–1311)

- Hoysala Empire (complete list) –

- Veera Ballala II, King (1173–1220)
- Vira Narasimha II, King (1220–1235)
- Vira Someshwara, King (1235–1263)
- Narasimha III, King (1263–1292)
- Veera Ballala III, King (1292–1343)

- Jaisalmer (complete list) –

- Kailan Singh, Rawal (1200–1219)
- Chachak Deo Singh, Rawal (1219–1241)
- Karan Singh I, Rawal (1241–1271)
- Lakhan Sen, Rawal (1271–1275)
- Punpal Singh, Rawal (1275–1276)
- Jaitsi Singh I, Rawal (1276–1294)
- Mulraj Singh I, Rawal (1294–1295)
- Durjan Sal (Duda), Rawal (1295–1306)

- Kadava dynasty (complete list) –

- Kopperunchinga I, King (c.1216–1242)
- Kopperunchinga II, King (c.1243–1279)

- Kahlur (complete list) –

- Sangar Chand, Raja (1197–1220)
- Megh Chand, Raja (1220–1251)
- Dev Chand, Raja (late 13th century)
- Ahim Chand, Raja (late 13th century)

- Kakatiya dynasty (complete list) –

- Ganapati-deva, King (c.1199–1262)
- Rudrama-devi, King (c.1262–1289)
- Prataparudra-deva, King (c.1289–1323)

- Kalachuris of Tripuri (complete list) –

- Vijayasimha, King (1188–1210)
- Trailokya-malla, King (c.1210–post-1211)

- Kumaon Kingdom: Chand (complete list) –

- Ram Chand, King (1195–1205)
- Bhishm Chand, King (1205–1226)
- Megh Chand, King (1226–1233)
- Dhyan Chand, King (1233–1251)
- Parvat Chand, King (1251–1261)
- Thor Chand, King (1261–1275)
- Kalyan Chand II, King (1275–1296)
- Trilok Chand, King (1296–1303)

- Kingdom of Kutch (complete list) –

- Ratto Rayadhan, King (1175–?)
- Othaji, King (1215–?)
- Gaoji, King (1255–?)
- Vehanji, King (1285–?)

- Kingdom of Marwar (complete list) –

- Siha, Rao (1226–1273)
- Asthan, Rao (1273–1292)
- Doohad, Rao (1292–1309)

- Pandyan dynasty (complete list) –

- Sadayavarman Kulasekaran I, King (1190–1216)
- Parakrama Pandyan II, King (1212–1215)
- Maravarman Sundara Pandyan, King (1216–1238)
- Sadayavarman Kulasekaran II, King (1238–1240)
- Maravarman Sundara Pandyan II, King (1238–1251)
- Sadayavarman Vikkiraman I, King (1241–1250)
- Maravarman Vikkiraman II, King (1250–1251)
- Jatavarman Sundara Pandyan I, King (1251–1268)
- Jatavarman Vira Pandyan II, co-King (1253–1275)
- Maravarman Kulasekara Pandyan I, King (1268–1308)

- Paramaras of Chandravati (complete list) –

- Dhara-varsha, King (c.1160–1220)

- Paramara dynasty of Malwa (complete list) –

- Subhatavarman, King (1194–1209)
- Arjunavarman I, King (1210–1215)
- Devapala, King (1218–1239)
- Jaitugideva, King (1239–1255
- Jayavarman II, King (1255–1274)
- Arjunavarman II, King (c.1275–post-1283)
- Bhoja II, King (post-1283–?)
- Mahlakadeva, King (?–1305)

- Seuna (Yadava) dynasty (complete list) –

- Jaitugi I, King (c.1191–1200/10)
- Simhana II, King (c.1200/10–1246)
- Krishna, King (c.1246–1261)
- Mahadeva, King (c.1261–1270)
- Ammana, King (c.1270)
- Ramachandra, King (c.1271–1308)

- Sisodia (complete list) –

- Khumar, Manthan, Padam Singh, Rajput (1179–1213)
- Jaitra Singh, Rajput (1213–1261)
- Teja Singh, Rajput (1261–1273)
- Samar Singh, Rajput (1273–1301)

- Vaghela dynasty (complete list) –

- Visala-deva, King (c.1244–c.1262)
- Arjuna-deva, King (c.1262–c.1275)
- Rama, King (c.1275)
- Saranga-deva, King (c.1275–c.1296)
- Karna, King (c.1296–c.1304)

- Yajvapala dynasty (complete list) –

- Chahada-deva, King (c.1237–1254) These coins are dated in Vikrama Samvat. They feature a horseman on one side, and the legend Srimat Chahadadeva on the other side.
- Asalla-deva, King (c.1254–1279) These coins also feature a horseman.

Maldives

- Sultanate of the Maldives: Theemuge dynasty (complete list) –

- Wadi, Sultan (1214–1233)
- Valla Dio, Sultan (1233–1258)
- Hudhei, Sultan (1258–1264)
- Aima, Sultan (1264–1266)
- Hali I, Sultan (1266–1268)
- Keimi, Sultan (1268–1269)
- Audha, Sultan (1269–1278)
- Hali II, Sultan (1278–1288)
- Yoosuf I, Sultan (1288–1294)
- Salis, Sultan (1294–1302)

Nepal

- Khasa kingdom

- Grags pa lde (Kradhicalla), King (fl.1225)
- A sog lde (Ashokacalla), King (fl.1255–1278)
- 'Ji dar sMal (Jitarimalla), King (fl.1287–1293)
- A nan sMal (Anandamalla), King (late 13th century)

- Malla (Kathmandu Valley) (complete list) –

- Ari Deva, King (c.1201–1216)
- Abhaya Malla, King (c.1216–1255)
- Ranasura, King (c.1216)
- Jayadeva Malla, King (c.1255–1258)
- Jayabhima Deva, King (c.1258–1271)
- Jayasimha Malla, King (c.1271–1274)
- Ananta Malla, King (c.1274–1310)

Sri Lanka

- Kingdom of Dambadeniya (complete list) –

- Vijayabahu III, King (1220–1224)
- Parakkamabahu II, King (1234–1269)
- Vijayabahu IV, King (1267/8–1270)
- Bhuvanaikabahu I, King (1271–1283)

- Jaffna Kingdom (complete list) –

- Kalinga Magha, King (1215–1255)
- Chandrabhanu, King (1255–1262)
- Savakanmaindan, King (1262–1277)
- Kulasekara Cinkaiariyan, King (1262–1284)
- Kulotunga Cinkaiariyan, King (1284–1292)
- Vickrama Cinkaiariyan, King (1292–1302)

- Kingdom of Polonnaruwa (complete list) –

- Lilavati, King (1197–1200, 1209–1210, 1211–1212)
- Sahassa Malla, King (1200–1202)
- Kalyanavati, King (1202–1208)
- Dharmasoka, King (1208–1209)
- Anikanga, King (1209–1209)
- Lokissara, King (1210–1211)
- Parakrama Pandya, King (1212–1215)
- Kalinga Magha, King (1215–1236)

=== Asia: West ===
Iran

- Khwarazmian Empire

- Ala al-Din Tekish, Khwarazmshah (1172–1200)
- Muhammad II, Khwarazmshah (1200–1221)
- Jalal al-Din Mangburni, Khwarazmshah (1220–1231)

Mesopotamia

- Abbasid Caliphate, Baghdad (complete list) –

- al-Nasir, Caliph (1180–1225)
- az-Zahir, Caliph (1225–1226)
- al-Mustansir, Caliph (1226–1242)
- al-Musta'sim, Caliph (1242–1258)
- to Cairo

Turkey

- Ottoman Empire (complete list) –

- Osman I, Sultan (c.1299–1326)

Yemen

- Yemeni Zaidi State (complete list) –

- al-Mansur Abdallah, Imam (1187–1217)
- an-Nasir Muhammad bin Abdallah, Imam (1217–1226)
- al-Hadi Yahya, Imam (1217–1239)
- al-Mahdi Ahmad bin al-Husayn, Imam (1248–1258)
- al-Hasan bin Wahhas, Imam (1258–1260)
- Yahya bin Muhammad as-Siraji, Imam (1261–1262)
- al-Mansur al-Hasan, Imam (1262–1271)
- al-Mahdi Ibrahim, Imam (1272–1276)
- al-Mutawakkil al-Mutahhar bin Yahya, Imam (1276–1298)

== Europe ==
=== Europe: Balkans ===
Bulgaria

- Second Bulgarian Empire (complete list) –

- Kaloyan, Emperor (1197–1207)
- Boril, Emperor (1207–1218)
- Ivan Asen II, Emperor (1218–1241)
- Kaliman I, Emperor (1241–1246)
- Michael II, Emperor (1246–1256)
- Kaliman Asen II, Emperor (1256)
- Mitso Asen, Emperor (1256–1257)
- Konstantin Tih, Emperor (1257–1277)
- Ivailo, Emperor (1278–1279)
- Ivan Asen III, Emperor (1279–1280)
- George Terter I, Emperor (1280–1292)
- Smilets, Emperor (1292–1298)
- Ivan II, Emperor (1298–1299)
- Chaka, Emperor (1299–1300)
- Theodore Svetoslav, Emperor (1300–1322)

Byzantium

- Byzantine Empire (complete list) –

- Alexios III Angelos, Emperor (1195–1203)
- Alexios IV Angelos, Emperor (1203–1204)
- Nicholas Kanabos, Emperor-elect (1204) as usurper chosen by the Senate
- Alexios V Doukas, Emperor (1204)

- Latin Empire (complete list) –

- Baldwin I, Emperor (1204–1205)
- Henry, Emperor (1206–1216)
- Peter, Emperor (1216–1217)
- Yolanda, Regent (1217–1219)
- Conon de Béthune, Regent (1219)
- Giovanni Colonna, Regent (1220–1221)
- Robert I, Emperor (1221–1228)
- Baldwin II, Emperor (1228–1261)
- John of Brienne, Senior co-Emperor (1229–1237)

- Principality of Achaea (complete list) –

- William I, Prince (1205–1209)
- Geoffrey I, Prince (1209/10–c.1229)
- Geoffrey II, Prince (c.1229–1246)
- William II, Prince (1246–1278)
- Charles I, Prince (1278–1285)
- Charles II, Prince (1285–1289)
- Isabella, Princess (1289–1307)
- Florent, Prince (1289–1297)

- Duchy of the Archipelago (complete list) –

- Marco I Sanudo, Duke (1207–1227)
- Angelo, Duke (1227–1262)
- Marco II, Duke (1262–1303)

- Byzantine Empire (complete list) –

- Michael VIII Palaiologos, Emperor (1261–1282)
- Andronikos II Palaiologos, Emperor (1282–1328)
- Michael IX Palaiologos, co-Emperor (1294–1320)

Serbia

- Grand Principality / Kingdom of Serbia (complete list) –

- Stefan the First-Crowned, Grand Prince (1196–1202, 1204–1217), King (1217–1228)
- Vukan Nemanjić, Grand Prince (1202–1204)
- Stefan Radoslav, King (1228–1233)
- Stefan Vladislav, King (1233–1243)
- Stefan Uroš I, King (1243–1276)
- Stefan Dragutin, King of Serbia (1276–1282), King of Syrmia (1282–1316)
- Stefan Milutin, King (1282–1321)

- Kingdom of Syrmia (complete list) –

- Stefan Dragutin, King of Serbia (1276–1282), King of Syrmia (1282–1316)

=== Europe: British Isles ===
Scotland

- Kingdom of Scotland/ Kingdom of Alba (complete list) –

- William I the Lion, King (1165–1214)
- Alexander II, King (1214–1249)
- Alexander III, King (1249–1286)
- Margaret, Queen (1286–1290)
Guardian of Scotland (1290–1292)
- John, King (1292–1296)

- Kingdom of the Isles: Mann and the North Isles (complete list) –

- Rǫgnvaldr Guðrøðarson, King (1187–1226)
- Óláfr Guðrøðarson, the Black, King (1226–1237)
- Óspakr-Hákon, King (c.1230)
- Guðrøðr Rǫgnvaldsson, King (c.1231)
- Haraldr Óláfsson, King (1237–1248)
- Rǫgnvaldr Óláfsson, King (1249)
- Haraldr Guðrøðarson, King (1249–1250)
- Magnús Óláfsson, King (1254–1265)

- Kingdom of the Isles: The South Isles (complete list) –

- Ragnall mac Somairle, King (1164–1207)
- Donnchadh of Argyll, King (1221/25–c.1244/48)
- Dubgall mac Dubgaill, King (?)
- Somairle mac Dubgaill, King (?–1230)
- Eóghan of Argyll, King (c.1244/48–c.1268)
- Dubhghall mac Ruaidhrí, King (1249–1266)

Wales

- Deheubarth (complete list) –

- Gruffydd ap Rhys II, ruler (1197–1201)
- Maelgwn ap Rhys, ruler (1199–1230)
- Rhys Gryg, ruler (1216–1234)
- Rhys Mechyll, ruler (1234–1244)
- Maredudd ap Rhys, ruler (1244–1271)
- Rhys ap Maredudd, ruler (1271–1283)

England and Ireland

- Kingdom of England and Lordship of Ireland (complete list) –

- John, King (1199–1216), Lord (1177–1216)
- Louis, disputed King (1216–1217)
- Henry III, King and Lord (1216–1272)
- Edward I, King and Lord (1272–1307)

Ireland

- Airgíalla (complete list) –

- Ua Eichnigh, King (?–1201)
- Giolla Pádraig Ó hAnluain, King (1201–1243)
- Eochaid mac Mathgahamna mac Neill, King (?–1273)
- Brian mac Eochada, King (1283–1311)

- Kingdom of Breifne (complete list) –

- Domnall Ó Ruairc, Lord (c.1207)
- Ualgarg Ó Ruairc, King (c.1196–1209)
- Art Ó Ruairc, King (1209–1210)
- Niall O'Ruairc, King (1228)
- Ualgarg Ó Ruairc, King (c.1210–1231)
- Cathal riabach O'Ruairc, King (1231–1236)
- Conchobar O'Ruairc, King (c.1250–1257)

- East Breifne (complete list) –

- Cathal Ua Raghallaigh, Lord (1256)
- Con Ua Raghallaigh, Chief (1256–1257)
- Matha Ua Raghallaigh, Lord (1282)
- Ferghal O'Raigillig, ruler (1282–1293)

- West Breifne (complete list) –

- Sitric Ó Ruairc, King (1257–1257)
- Amlaíb Ó Ruairc, King (1257–1258)
- Domnall Ó Ruairc, King (1258–1258)
- Art Ó Ruairc, King (1258–1259)
- Domnall Ó Ruairc, King (1259–1260)
- Art Bec Ó Ruairc, King (1260–1260)
- Art Ó Ruairc, King (1261–1266)
- Conchobar Buide Ó Ruairc, King (1266–1273)
- Tigernán Ó Ruairc, King (1273–1274)
- Art Ó Ruairc, King (1275–1275)
- Amlaib Ó Ruairc, King (c.1275–1307)

- Connachta (complete list) –

- Cathal Carragh Ua Conchobair, King (1190–1202)
- Mathghamhain mac Conchobar Maenmaige Ua Conchobair, King (?)
- Muirchertach Tethbhach, King (?)
- Donnchadh Conallagh Ua Conchobair, King (?)
- Tadhg mac Conchobar Maenmaige Ua Conchobair, King (?)
- Mael Seachlainn mac Conchobar Maenmaige Ua Conchobair, King (?)
- Aodh mac Conchobar Maenmaige Ua Conchobair, King (?)
- Aedh Ua Conchobair, King (?)
- Felim Ua Conchobair, King (?)
- Aedh mac Felim Ó Conchobair, King (?)
- Aedh Muimhnech Ó Conchobair, King (?)
- Aedh Ó Conchobair, King (1293–1309)

- Leinster (complete list) –

- Domhnall Óg mac Domhnall Caomhánach, King (?)
- Muirchertach mac Domhnall Óg mac Murchada Caomhánach, King (?–1282)
- Muiris mac Muirchertach mac Murchada Caomhánach, King (1282–1314)

- Magh Luirg (complete list) –

- Tomaltach na Cairge MacDermot, King (1196–1207)
- Cathal Carrach mac Diarmata, King (1207–1215)
- Dermot mac Diarmata, King (1215–1218)
- Cormac mac Diarmata, King (1218–1244)
- Muirchertach mac Diarmata, King (1245–1265)
- Tadhg mac Diarmata, King (1256–1281)
- Dermot Mideach mac Diarmata, King (1281–1287)
- Cathal mac Diarmata, King (1288–1294)
- Maelruanaidh mac Diarmata, King (1294–1331)

- Síol Anmchadha (complete list) –

- Diarmaid Cleirech Ua Madadhan, King (1188–1207)
- Madudan Óg Ó Madadhan, King (1207–1235 )
- Cathal Ó Madadhan, King (1235–1286)
- Murchadh Ó Madadhan, Lord (1286–1327)

- Uí Maine (complete list) –

- Domnall Mór Ua Cellaigh, King (?–1221)

=== Europe: Central ===
See also List of state leaders in the 13th-century Holy Roman Empire

- Holy Roman Empire, Kingdom of Germany (complete list, complete list) –

- Otto IV, Holy Roman Emperor (1209–1215), King (1198–1209)
- Philip, King (1198–1208)
- Otto IV, King (1198–1209)
- Frederick II, Holy Roman Emperor (1220–1250), King (1212–1220)
- Conrad IV, contender King (1237–1254)
- Henry Raspe, rival King (1246–1247)
- William II of Holland, rival King (1247–1256)
- Richard of Cornwall, contender King (1257–1272)
- Alfonso X, rival King (1257–1275)
- Rudolf I, contender King (1273–1291)
- Adolf, King (1292–1298)
- Albert I, King (1298–1308)

Hungary

- Kingdom of Hungary (1000–1301) (complete list) –

- Emeric, King (1196–1204)
- Ladislaus III, King (1204–1205)
- Andrew II, King (1205–1235)
- Béla IV, King (1235–1270)
- Stephen V, King (1270–1272)
- Ladislaus IV, King (1272–1290)
- Andrew III, King (1290–1301)

Poland

- Seniorate Province in the Fragmentation of Poland (complete list) –

- Leszek the White, High Duke (1194–1198, 1199–1202, 1206–1210, 1211–1227)
- Mieszko III the Old, High Duke (1173–1177, 1191, 1198–1199, 1202)
- Władysław III Spindleshanks, High Duke (1202–1206, 1227–1229)
- Mieszko IV Tanglefoot, High Duke (1210–1211)
- Konrad I, High Duke (1229–1232, 1241–1243)
- Henry the Bearded, High Duke (1232–1238)
- Henry II the Pious, High Duke (1238–1241)
- Bolesław the Horned, High Duke (1288, 1289)
- Bolesław V the Chaste, High Duke (1243–1279)
- Leszek II the Black, High Duke (1279–1288)
- Henryk IV Probus, High Duke (1288–1289, 1289–1290)
- Władysław I Łokietek, High Duke (1289)
- Przemysł II, High Duke (1290–1291), King (1295–1296)
- Wenceslaus II, High Duke (1291–1300), King (1300–1305)

- Duchy of Opole (complete list) –

- Jarosław Opolski, Duke (1173–1201)
- Bolesław I the Tall, Duke (1201)
- Henry I the Bearded, Duke (1201–1202)
- Mieszko I Tanglefoot, Duke (1202–1211)
- Casimir I, Duke (1211–1230)
- Mieszko II the Fat, Duke (1230–1246)
- Władysław I, Duke (1246–1281)
- Bolko I, Duke (1281–1313)

- Duchy of Masovia (complete list) –

- Konrad I, Duke (1200–1247)
- Bolesław I, Duke (1247–1248)
- Siemowit I, Duke (1248–1262)
- Pereyaslava of Halych, Regent (1248–1264)
- Bolesław the Pious, Duke (1262–1264)
- Konrad II, Duke of Masovia (1264–1275), Duke of Czersk (1275–1294)
- Bolesław II, Duke of Płock (1275–1294), Duke of Masovia (1294–1313)

- State of the Teutonic Order (complete list) –

- Heinrich Walpot, Grand Master (1198–pre-1208)
- Otto von Kerpen, Grand Master (fl.1208)
- Heinrich von Tunna, Grand Master (1208–1209)
- Hermann von Salza, Grand Master (1209–1239)
- Konrad von Thüringen, Grand Master (1239–1240)
- Gerhard von Malberg, Grand Master (1240–1244)
- Heinrich von Hohenlohe, Grand Master (1244–1249)
- Günther von Wüllersleben, Grand Master (1249–1252)
- Poppo von Osterna, Grand Master (1252–1256)
- Anno von Sangershausen, Grand Master (1256–1273)
- Hartmann von Heldrungen, Grand Master (1273–1282)
- Burchard von Schwanden, Grand Master (1283–1290)
- Konrad von Feuchtwangen, Grand Master (1290–1297)
- Gottfried von Hohenlohe, Grand Master (1297–1303)

=== Europe: East ===
- Blue Horde (complete list) –

- Orda, Khan (1226–1251)
- Qun Quran, Khan (1251–1280)
- Köchü, Khan (1280–1302)

- Kievan Rus' (complete list) –

- Rurik II, Grand Prince (1194–1202)
- Igor III, Grand Prince (1202)
- Rurik II, Grand Prince (1203–1206)
- Roman II the Great, Grand Prince (1203–1206)
- Rostislav II, Grand Prince (1203–1206)
- Vsevolod IV the Red, Grand Prince (1206–1207)
- Rurik II, Grand Prince (1207–1210)
- Vsevolod IV the Red, Grand Prince (1210–1212)
- Igor III, Grand Prince (1212–1214)
- Mstislav III, Grand Prince (1214–1223)
- Vladimir IV, Grand Prince (1223–1235)
- Iziaslav IV, Grand Prince (1235–1236)
- Yaroslav III, Grand Prince (1236–1238)
- Michael II, Grand Prince (1238–1239)

- Grand Duchy of Lithuania (complete list) –

- Mindaugas, Grand Duke (1236–1253), King (1253–1263)
- Treniota, Grand Duke (1263–1264)
- Vaišvilkas, Grand Duke (1264–1267)
- Shvarn, Grand Duke (1267–1269)
- Traidenis, Grand Duke (1270–1282)
- Daumantas, Grand Duke (1282–1285)
- Butigeidis, Grand Duke (1285–1291)
- Butvydas, Grand Duke (1291–1295)
- Vytenis, Grand Duke (1295–1316)

- Grand Duchy of Moscow (complete list) –

- Daniel of Moscow, Grand prince (1283–1303)

- Vladimir-Suzdal (complete list) –

- Vsevolod the Big Nest, Grand Duke (1176–1212)
- Yuri II, Grand Duke (1212–1216, 1218–1238)
- Konstantin of Rostov, Grand Duke (1216–1218)
- Yaroslav II, Grand Duke (1238–1246)
- Sviatoslav III, Grand Duke (1246–1248, 1248–1249)
- Mikhail Khorobrit, Grand Duke (1248)
- Andrey II, Grand Duke (1249–1252)
- Alexander I, Grand Duke (1252–1263)
- Yaroslav III, Grand Duke (1264–1271)
- Vasily of Kostroma, Grand Duke (1272–1277)
- Dmitry of Pereslavl, Grand Duke (1277–1281, 1283–1293)
- Andrey III, Grand Duke (1281–1283, 1293–1304)

- Principality of Wallachia (complete list) –

- Radu Negru, Prince (c.1290–1310)

=== Europe: Nordic ===
Denmark

- Denmark (complete list) –

- Canute VI, King (1182–1202)
- Valdemar II, King (?) / Valdemar the Young, King (?)
- Eric IV, King (?)
- Abel, King (?)
- Christopher I, King (?)
- Eric V, King (?)
- Eric VI, King (1286–1319)

- Duchy of Schleswig (complete list) –

- Valdemar II of Denmark, Duke (1183–1216)
- Valdemar the Young, Duke (1209–1216)
- Eric IV of Denmark, Duke (1216–1232)
- Abel, King of Denmark, Duke (1232–1252)
- Valdemar III, Duke of Schleswig, Duke (1253–1257)
- Eric I, Duke of Schleswig, Duke (1260–1272)
- Valdemar IV, Duke of Schleswig, Duke (1283–1312)

Norway

- Kingdom of Norway (872–1397) (complete list) –

- Sverre, King (1184–1202)
- Haakon III, King (1202–1204)
- Guttorm, King (1204)
- Inge II, King (1204–1217)
- Haakon IV, King (1217–1263)
- Haakon the Young, co-King (1240–1257)
- Magnus VI, King (1263–1280)
- Eric II, King (1280–1299)
- Haakon V, King (1299–1319)

Sweden

- Sweden (800–1521) (complete list) –

- Sverker II, King (1195/96–1208)
- Eric X, King (1208–1216)
- John I, King (1216–1222)
- Eric XI, King (1222–1229, 1234–1250)
- Canute II the Tall, King (1229–1234)
- Valdemar, King (1250–1275)
- Magnus III, King (1275–1290)
- Birger, King (1290–1318)

=== Europe: Southcentral ===
See also List of state leaders in the 13th-century Holy Roman Empire#Italy

- Kingdom of Italy (Holy Roman Empire) (complete list) –

- Otto IV, King (1209–1212)
- Frederick II, King (1212–1250)

- Margraviate of Modena, Reggio, and Ferrara (complete list) –

- Obizzo II, Marquis of Ferrara (1264–1293), of Modena and Reggio (1288/89–1293)
- Azzo VIII, Marquis of Reggio (1293–1306), of Ferrara (1293–1308)
- Aldobrandino II, Marquis of Modena (1293–1308), of Ferrara (1308–1326)

- March of Montferrat (complete list) –

- Boniface I, Marquis (1192–1207)
- William VI, Marquis (1207–1225)
- Boniface II, Marquis (1225–1253/55)
- William VII, Marquis (1253/55–1292)
- John I, Marquis (1292–1305)

- Papal States (complete list) –

- Innocent III, Pope (1198–1216)
- Honorius III, Pope (1216–1227)
- Gregory IX, Pope (1227–1241)
- Celestine IV, Pope (1241)
- Innocent IV, Pope (1243–1254)
- Alexander IV, Pope (1254–1261)
- Urban IV, Pope (1261–1264)
- Clement IV, Pope (1265–1268)
- Gregory X, Pope (1271–1276)
- Innocent V, Pope (1276)
- Adrian V, Pope (1276)
- John XXI, Pope (1276–1277)
- Nicholas III, Pope (1277–1280)
- Martin IV, Pope (1281–1285)
- Honorius IV, Pope (1285–1287)
- Nicholas IV, Pope (1288–1292)
- Celestine V, Pope (1294)
- Boniface VIII, Pope (1294–1303)

- San Marino

- Captains Regent (1243–1500) –

- Oddone Scarito, Filippo da Sterpeto, Captains Regent (1243–1244)
- Oddone Scarito, Andrea Superchj, Captains Regent (1253)
- Taddeo di Giovani Ardelj, Captain Regent (1254)
- Ugolino Baracone, Captain Regent (1286)

- Republic of Venice (complete list) –

- Enrico Dandolo, Doge (1192–1205)
- Pietro Ziani, Doge (1205–1229)
- Jacopo Tiepolo, Doge (1229–1249)
- Marino Morosini, Doge (1249–1252)
- Reniero Zeno, Doge (1252–1268)
- Lorenzo Tiepolo, Doge (1268–1275)
- Jacopo Contarini, Doge (1275–1280)
- Giovanni Dandolo, Doge (1280–1289)
- Pietro Gradenigo, Doge (1289–1311)

==== Southern Italy ====
- Kingdom of Sicily (complete list) –

- Frederick I, King (1198–1250)
- Henry II, King (1212–1217)
- Conrad I, King (1250–1254)
- Conradin, King (1254–1258)
- Manfred, King (1258–1266)
- Charles I, King (1266–1282/85)

split into Naples and the island of Sicily

- Kingdom of Naples (complete list) –

- Charles I, King (1282–1285)
- Charles II the Lame, King (1285–1309)

- Kingdom of Trinacria: Sicily (complete list) –

- Peter I, King (1282–1285)
- James II, King (1285–1295)
- Frederick II, King (1295–1337)

- Principality of Taranto (complete list) –

- Walter III of Brienne, Prince (1200–1205)
- Frederick, Prince (1205–1250)
- Manfred of Sicily, Prince (1250–1266)
- Charles I, Prince (1266–1285)
- Charles II, Prince (1285–1294)
- Philip I, Prince (1294–1331)

=== Europe: Southwest ===
Iberian Peninsula

- Crown of Aragon (complete list) –

- Peter II, King (1196–1213)
- James I, King (1213–1276)
- Peter III, King (1276–1285)
- Alfonso III, King (1285–1291)
- James II, King (1291–1327)

- Kingdom / Crown of Castile (complete list) –

- Alfonso VIII the Noble, King (1158–1214)
- Henry I, King (1214–1217)
- Berengaria the Great, King (1217–1217)
- Ferdinand III the Saint, King (1217–1252)
- Alfonso X the Wise, King (1252–1284)
- Sancho IV the Brave, King (1284–1295)
- Ferdinand IV the Summoned, King (1295–1312)

- County of Barcelona (complete list) –

- Peter II, Count (1196–1213)
- James I, Count (1213–1276)
- Peter II, Count (1276–1285)
- Alphonse II, Count (1285–1291)
- James II, Count (1291–1327)

- Emirate of Granada

- Muhammad I (1238–1272)
- Muhammad II (1273–1302)

- Kingdom of Navarre (complete list) –

- Sancho VII, King (1194–1234)
- Theobald I, King (1234–1253)
- Theobald II, King (1253–1270)
- Henry I, King (1270–1274)
- Joan I, Queen (1274–1305)
- Philip I, King (1284–1305)

- Kingdom of Portugal (complete list) –

- Sancho I, King (1185–1212)
- Afonso II, King (1212–1223)
- Sancho II, King (1223–1247)
- Afonso III, King (1248–1279)
- Denis I, King (1279–1325)

Marca Hispanica

- Andorra

- Episcopal Co-Princes (complete list) –

- Pere d'Urtx, Episcopal Co-Prince (1269–1293)
- Guillem de Montcada, Episcopal Co-Prince (1295–1308)

- French Co-Princes (complete list) –

- Roger-Bernard III, French Co-Prince (1278–1302)

- County of Cerdanya (complete list) –

- Sancho I, Count (1168–1223)
- Nuño, Count (1223–1242)
- James I, Count (1242–1276)
- James II, Count (1276–1311)

- County of Urgell (complete list) –

- Ermengol VIII of Sant Hilari, Count (1184–1208/1209)
- Aurembiaix, Countess (1208/1209–1213, 1228–1231), from 1229 with her husband, Peter
- Guerau I of Urgell, (usurper) Count (1213–1228)
- James I of Aragon, Count (1231–1236)
- Ponç I, Count (1236–1243)
- Ermengol IX, Count (1243)
- Álvaro the Castilian, Count (1243–1268)
- Ermengol X, Count (1268–1314)

=== Europe: West ===
France

- Kingdom of France (complete list) –

- Philip II Augustus, King (1180–1223)
- Louis VIII the Lion, King (1223–1226)
- Louis IX the Saint, King (1226–1270)
- Philip III the Bold, King (1270–1285)
- Philip IV, King (1285–1314)

- County of Angoulême (complete list) –

- Aymer III, Count (1186–1202)
- Isabella, Countess (1202–1246)
- John of England, Count (1202–1216)

- Anjou (complete list) –

- John I Tristan, Count (1219–1232)
- Margaret, Countess (1285–1299)
- Philip, Count (1293–1328)

- Duchy of Aquitaine (complete list) –

- John I, Duke (1199–1216)
- Henry II, Duke (Henry III of England)(1216–1272)
- Edward I Longshanks, Duke (1272–1307)

- County of Artois (complete list) –

- Louis VIII of France, Count (1190–1223)
- Robert I, Count (1237–1250)
- Robert II, Count (1250–1302)

- Auvergne (complete list) –

- Guy II of Auvergne, Count (1195–1224)
- William X of Auvergne, Count (1224–1246)
- Robert V, count of Auvergne, Count (1246–1277)
- William XI of Auvergne, Count (1277–1279)
- Robert VI, count of Auvergne, Count (1279–1317)

- County of Boulogne (complete list) –

- Ida, Countess (1173–1216)
- Matilda II, Countess (1216–1260)
- Philip I, Count (1223–1235)
- Afonso, Count (1235–1253)
- Adelaide, Count (1260–1261)
- Robert I, Count (1261–1277)
- Robert II, Count (1277–1314)

- Bourbonnais (complete list) –

- Archambaud VIII de Bourbon, Lord (1218–1242)
- Archambaud IX de Bourbon, Lord (1242–1249)
- Matilda II, Countess of Nevers, Lady (1249–1262)
- Agnès de Bourbon (1237–1287), Lady (1262–1287)
- Béatrice de Bourgogne (1257–1310), Lady (1287–1310)

- Duchy of Brittany (complete list) –

- Guy of Thouars, Duke (1199–1201)
- Arthur I, Duke (1196–1203)
- Alix, Duchess (1203–1221)
- Peter I, Duke (1213–1221)
- John I, Duke (1221–1286)
- John II, Duke (1286–1305)

- Duchy of Burgundy (complete list) –

- Odo III, Duke (1192–1218)
- Hugh IV, Duke (1218–1271)
- Robert II, Duke (1271–1306)

- County of Champagne (complete list) –

- Theobald III, Count (1197–1201)
- Theobald IV, Count (1201–1253)
- Theobald V, Count (1253–1270)
- Henry III, Count (1270–1274)
- Joan, Countness (1274–1305)
- Louis, Count (1305–1316)

- County of Flanders (complete list) –

- Baldwin IX, Count (1194–1205)
- Joan I, Countess (1205–1244)
- Ferdinand of Portugal, Count (1212–1233)
- Thomas of Savoy-Piedmont, Count (1237–1244)
- Margaret II, Countess (1244–1278)
- William I, Count (1247–1251)
- Guy I, Count (1251–1305)

- Duchy of Gascony (complete list) –

- Eleanor of Aquitaine, Duchess (1137–1204)

- County of Maine (complete list) –

- John Lackland, Count (1200–1205)

- Arthur I of Brittany, Count (1186–1203)

- John Tristan, Count (1219–1232)
- Charles I, Count (1246–1285)
- Charles II, Count (1285–1325)

- Monaco (complete list) –

- Rainier I, Lord (1297–1301)

- County of Nevers (complete list) –

- Matilda I, Countess (1192–1257)
- Hervé IV of Donzy, Count (1199–1223)
- Guigues of Forez, Count (1226–1241)
- Matilda II, Countess (1257–1262)
- Odo, Count (1257–1262)
- Yolande II, Countess (1262–1280)
- John Tristan, Count (1265–1270)
- Robert III of Bethune, Count (1272–1280)
- Louis I, Count (1280–1322)

- County of Poitou (complete list) –

- Richard II, Count (1224)
- Alphonse I, Count (1220–1271)
- Philip I, Count (1293–1322)

- County of Toulouse (complete list) –

- Raymond VI (VIII), Count (1194–1222)
  - opposed by Simon IV de Montfort, Count (1215–1218)
- Raymond VII (IX), Count (1222–1249)
- Joan & Alphonse, Count of Poitiers, Countess & Count (1249–1271)

=== Eurasia: Caucasus ===
- Kingdom of Georgia (complete list) –

- Tamar the Great, Queen (1178–1213)
- George IV, King (1207–1223)
- Rusudan, Queen (1223–1245)
- David VI Narin, King (1245–1259)

- Kingdom of Imereti (complete list) –

- David VI Narin, King (1259–1293)
- Vakhtang II, King (1289–1292)
- Constantine I, King (1293–1327)

- Gazikumukh Khanate (complete list) –

- Badr I, Shamkhal (1295–1304)

- Eastern Georgia (complete list) –

- David VII Ulu, King (1247–1270)
- Demetrius II, King (1270–1289)
- David VIII, King (1292–1302, 1308–1311)
- George V, King (1299–1302, 1314–1346)

== Oceania ==
Chile: Easter Island

- Easter Island (complete list) –

- Tu Te Rei Manana, King (c.1200)
- Ko Te Kura Tahonga, King (?)
- Taoraha Kaihahanga, King (?)
- Tukuma(kuma), King (?)
- Te Kahui Tuhunga, King (?)
- Te Tuhunga Hanui, King (?)

Tonga

- Tuʻi Tonga Empire (complete list) –

- Talaihaʻapepe, King (?)
- Talakaifaiki, King (c.1250)
- Talafāpite, King (?)
- Tuʻitonga Maʻakitoe, King (?)

United States: Hawaii

- Island of Hawaiʻi (complete list) –

- Kaniuhu, supreme high chief (1185–1215)
- Kanipahu, supreme high chief (1215–1245)
- Kamaʻiole, usurper (1245–1255)
- Kalapana of Hawaiʻi, supreme high chief (1255–1285)
- Kahaʻimaoeleʻa, supreme high chief (1285–1315)

== See also ==
- List of state leaders in the 13th-century Holy Roman Empire
