= Hugh O'Conor (disambiguation) =

Hugh O'Conor (born 1975) is an Irish actor, writer, director, and photographer.

Hugh O'Conor may also refer to:

- Hugh McOwen O'Conor, king of Connacht, Ireland, 1293–1309
- Hugh McHugh Breifne O'Conor, king of Connacht, Ireland, 1342–1350

== See also ==
- Hugh O'Connor (1962–1995), American actor
- Hugh O'Connor (filmmaker) (1924–1967), Canadian director and producer
