= Cathal mac Ruaidri Ó Conchobair =

King of all the Connachta

Cathal mac Ruaidri Ó Conchobair was a king (r. 1426–1439) of the Connachta of western Ireland.

The ascension date of Cathal as king of all the Connachta is uncertain, though F.X. Martin assigns it to 1426. He was one of the last of the kings, who were by now reduced to their ancestral lands in County Roscommon. He died on 19 March 1439.

Preceded by Ruaidri mac Tairdelbach Ó Conchobair	King of Connacht; 1426–1439	Succeeded by Aedh mac Tairdelbach Óg Ó Conchobair
