= Clonalis House =

Historic manor house in Ireland

Coordinates: 53.7667°N 8.5000°W

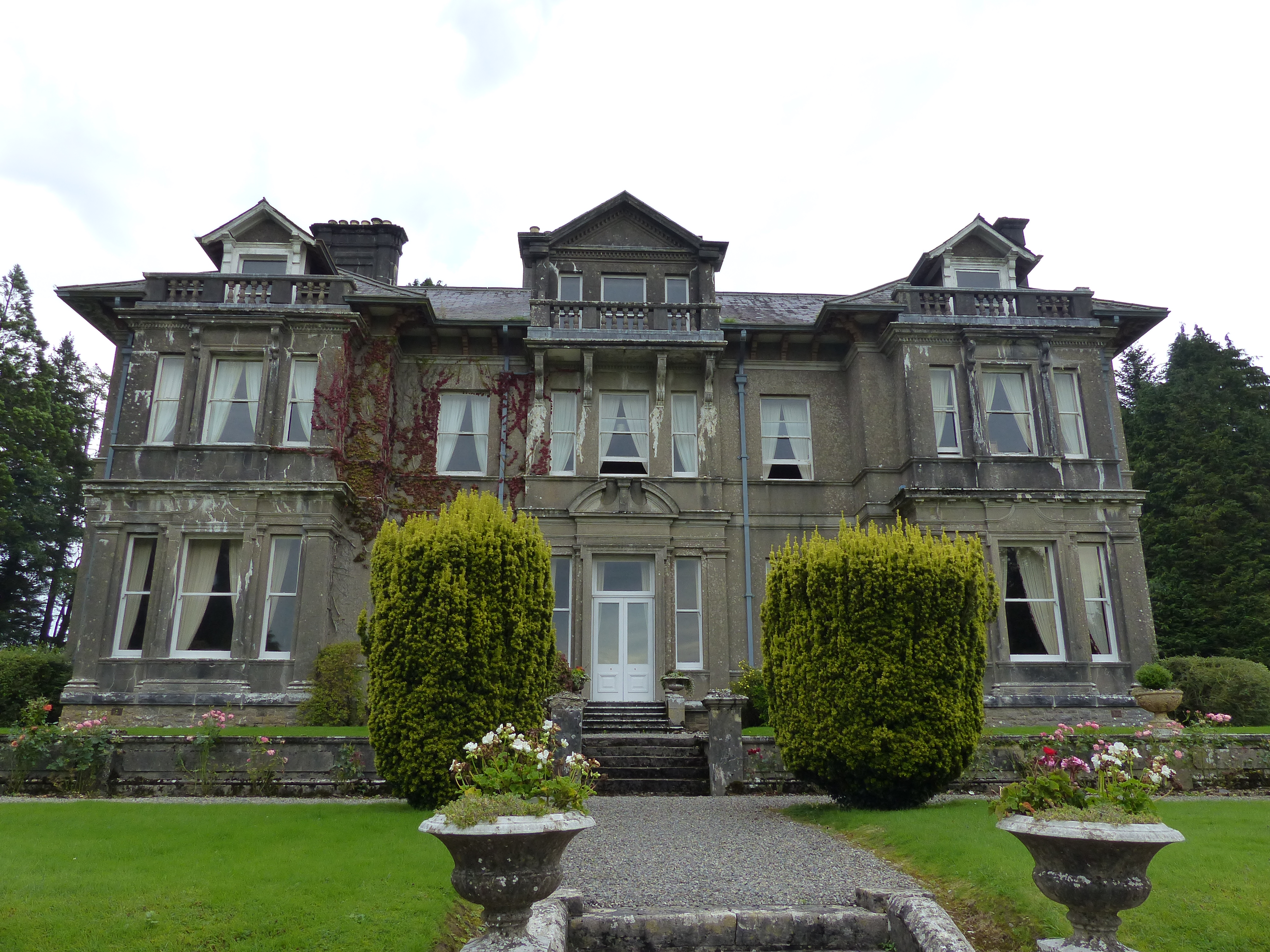
Clonalis House

Clonalis House (Irish: Teach Chluain Mhalais) is an historic manor house in Castlerea, County Roscommon, Ireland, and the ancestral home of the O'Conor Don, who are direct descendants of Cathal Crobhdearg Ua Conchobair, King of Connacht, a younger brother of Ruaidrí Ua Conchobair, the last High King of Ireland.

The current building was constructed in 1878 by Charles Owen O'Conor as a replacement for an earlier house on the same site which was frequently damaged by flooding. Built of mass concrete, its design by Frederick Pepys Cockerell is of a mixture of styles drawing on the traditions of Italianate and Queen Anne Style architecture.

Its history reflects the turbulence of Irish history, having once been occupied by the Irish Republican Army before it was shelled and captured by Free State Forces during the Irish Civil War. Some 100,000 volumes are contained in the family archives and library of the O'Conor Don which are still held at Clonalis House, making it a valuable repository of Irish history.
