= Fedlim Geancach Ó Conchobair =

Fedlim Geancach Ó Conchobair (Feidhlimidh Gheangcaigh mac Toirdhealbhaigh Óig Ó Conchobhair Donn) (died 1475) was an Irish monarch of the fifteenth century. He was one of the sons of Toirdhealbhach Óg Donn Ó Conchobair and King of Connacht from 1461–1475. Fedlim Geancach Ó Conchobair succeeded to the throne of Connacht in 1461 after the death of Aedh mac Tairdelbach Óg Ó Conchobair. He was the last fully recognized monarch of The Kingdom of Connacht.

Preceded by Aedh mac Tairdelbach Óg Ó Conchobair	King of Connacht; 1461–1475	Succeeded by End of Monarchy in Connacht
