= Aedh mac Tairdelbach Óg Ó Conchobair =

Aedh mac Tairdelbach Óg Ó Conchobair (died 15 May 1461), was one of the sons of Toirdhealbhach Óg Donn Ó Conchobair and King of Connacht from 1439 to 1461. Aedh Ó Conchobair succeeded to the throne of the Connachta in 1439 after the death of Cathal mac Ruaidri Ó Conchobair and was succeeded by Fedlim Ó Conchobair, also a son of Toirdhealbhach Óg Donn Ó Conchobair.

Preceded by Cathal mac Ruaidri Ó Conchobair	King of Connacht; 1439–1461	Succeeded by Fedlim Geancach Ó Conchobair
