= Toirdelbach Ó Conchobair =

Toirdelbach Ó Conchobair, anglicised Turlough O'Conor, was one of a number of claimants to the kingship of Connacht in the disastrous aftermath of the Second Battle of Athenry. He overthrew Rory na BhFeadh but was himself overthrown in 1318.

Regaining the kingship in 1324, he was the first ruler in over a generation to rule for a lengthy period (till his death in 1342) but the dynasty's activities would now remain within Connacht, as the last attempt to regain the high-kingship ended in 1316. Although overall ruler, successive kings came from different dynastic septs who eventually splintered altogether, with no one Ó Conchobair reigning supreme.

== See also ==
- O'Conor

Preceded by Rory na-bhFeadh mac Donough Ua Conchobair	King of Connacht; 1317–1318	Succeeded by Cathal mac Domhnall Ua Conchobair
Preceded by Cathal mac Domhnall Ua Conchobair	King of Connacht; 1324–1342	Succeeded by Aedh mac Aedh Breifneach Ua Conchobair
