= Ruaidri mac Tairdelbach Ó Conchobair =

King of Connacht

Ruaidri mac Tairdelbach Ua Conchobair, King of Connacht, died 1384. The previous king though not listed was slain and defeated by the Ó Cellaigh's of Ui Maine.

The Annals of the Four Masters say of him:

"Rory, the son of Turlough O'Conor, King of Connacht, died of the plague on the night of St Catherine's festival, after reigning sixteen years and three months as king of all Connacht, as the poet Maoilin Ó Mulconry testifies in the poem which enumerates the kings of Ireland:"

"Rory the Royal obtained the reins/For sixteen years and a quarter/At Cruachan-Aoi, without contention/The son of Turlough, fierce in battles."

"After this two lords were set up in Connacht, Turlough Oge, son of Hugh, son of Turlough, was inaugurated by O'Kelly, the Clann-Rickard, Donnell, son of Murtough O'Conor, and all the Clann-Donough; Turlough Roe, son of Hugh, son of Felim, son of Hugh, son of Owen, was likewise installed into the lordship by Mac Dermot, the race of Murtough Muimhneach, and all the other chieftains of Sil-Murray. In consequence of this, a great war afterwards broke out through all Connacht, in general, so that they were much disturbed."

Preceded by Aedh mac Tairdelbach Ua Conchobair	King of Connacht; 1368–1384	Succeeded by Toirdhealbhach Óg Donn Ó Conchobair
