= Conchobar Maenmaige Ua Conchobair =

Irish king

Conchobar Maenmaige Ua Conchobair, son of High King of Ireland Ruaidrí Ua Conchobair, was King of Connacht from 1183 to 1189. He was a military commander and opponent of the Norman invasion of Ireland.

== Early life ==
Conchobar Maenmaige took his nickname from the territory of Trícha Máenmaige where he had been fostered as a child.

Conchobar was apparently the eldest of at least eight sons of Ruaidrí Ua Conchobair. He first comes to notice in 1163 when his father was already King of Connacht. Niall mac Muircheartach Ua Lochlainn, son of the High King had, on a royal heir's feasting visitation... through Leath Cuinn... committed various acts of violence in territories and churches.

Coming to Ath Luain he led a force of twelve score men across the bridge and into Connacht, invading Hy-Many. However, "tria fheill & mheabhail" ("through treachery and guile") "ro marbait uile lá Conchobhar Ua Ceallaigh & la Concobhar Maonmhaighe, & lá h-Uibh Máine" ("they were all killed by Conchobhar Ua Ceallaigh and Conchobhar Maonmhaighe, and the Uí Maine"). Niall was captured "and conducted in safety to his house, by advice of their meeting".

== Wars against the Normans and Irish ==
Conchobar Maenmaige is next mentioned in the Annals of Ulster in 1174 in the following terse statement: "The battle of Durlus [was gained] by Domnall Ua Briain and by Conchobur Maenmhaighi upon the people of the son of the Empress (namely, of the king of the Saxons)." The Annals of the Four Masters list his presence at The Battle of the Connors in Hy-Many in 1180.

In 1184 the King of Meath, Art Ua Melaghlin, "was treacherously slain by Dermot O' Brien (i.e. the son of Turlough), at the instigation of the English". Ruaidri supported the O'Melaghlins as he had annexed much of the midlands to Connacht and Art's successor, Melaghlin Beg O'Melaghlin was aided by Conchobar. The armies of Connacht and Meath, led by both men, attacked and destroyed castles in areas conquered by the invaders, the result being "many of the English were slain".

In 1185 war broke out among the Princes of Connacht ("ríogh-dhamhna", literally "king material"), as three contenders for the kingship of Connacht assailed both Ruaidrí and each other. One of them was Connor's own son, Cathal Carragh Ua Conchobair, the other two being Conor mac Cormac Ua Conchobar and Cathal Crobdearg Ua Conchobair. Conchobar appears to have supported his father, but as events of the following year would show he too appears to have become impatient for change and a chance to turn the tide. At any rate, for now, though "the contests between them many were slain," Ruaidrí "and his son afterwards made peace with the other chiefs."

Reconciled, Conchobair and Cathal Carragh burned Killaloe, as well churches as houses, and carried off all the jewels and riches of the inhabitants ... [left Thomond] ... destroyed and pillaged. In this Conchobar commanded Norman allies, who came as far as [from] Roscommon, where Ruaidri gave them three thousand cows as wages.

== King of Connacht ==
In 1186 warfare finally erupted between father and son, and by the contests between both the Connacians were destroyed. At length ... by the advice of the Sil-Murray, Ruaidri was allowed to return, and a trícha cét of land was given to him.

Conchobar immediately began establishing his rule, by killing king, Murrough O Cellaig. The following year he returned to Leinster and along with Melaghlin Beg Ua Melaghlin burned and demolished the castle of Kildare, where not one of the English escaped, but were all suffocated, or otherwise killed. They carried away their accoutrements, arms, shields, coats of mail, and horses, and slew two knights.

Two years later it was Connacht's turn to be on the receiving end, as John de Courcy led a Norman incursion into the province, accompanied by Conor mac Cormac. Conchobar roused the Connacht chieftains, and was joined by his paternal 1st cousin, Donnell Mor Ua Brian, King of Thomond. Apparently, all the Normans could do was stay on the move because the Connacht forces would not suffer them to tarry any longer in their country.

While camped at Ballysadare, the King of Tirconnell likewise assembled his forces to deny them access north into Tirconnell. Forced back, the English were returning by way of the Curlew Mountains where they were attacked by the Connacians and Momonians... those who survived retreated with difficulty from the country, without effecting much destruction on this incursion.

== Assassination ==
This successful first act was denied a sequel when in 1189 Conchobar was killed in Clanconway. The assassins were Manus mac Flann Ua Finaghty, Aodh mac Brian (his first cousin), Muircheartach mac Cathal mac Dermot mac Tadhg, and Giolla na Naomh Ua Mulvihill of the Tuathas. His murderers were described as a party of his own people and tribes, though the real culprit seems to have been that other contender for the kingship of Connaucht, Connor mac Cormac. In the same sentence, he was described as the King of all Connacht, both English and Irish. The annalist further stated:

Alas for the party who plotted this conspiracy against the life of the heir presumptive to the throne of Ireland! To him the greater part of Leth-Mhogha had submitted as king. Donnell O'Brien had gone to his house at Dunloe, where he was entertained for a week; and Ó Conor gave him sixty cows out of every cantred in Connacht, and ten articles ornamented with gold; but Ó Brien did not accept of any of these, save one goblet, which had once been the property of Dermot Ó Brien, his own grandfather. Rory Mac Donslevy, King of Ulidia, had gone to his house. Mac Carthy, King of Desmond, was in his house, and Ó Conor gave him a great stipend, namely, five horses out of every cantred in Connacht. Melaghlin Beg, king of Tara, was in his house and took away a large stipend; and Ó Rourke had gone to his house, and also carried with him a great stipend.

== Successors and descendants ==
Ruaidri was once more recalled to be king, though only briefly and ended his days as a monk at Cong. Cathal Carragh killed Connor mac Cormac later the same year in revenge of the death of his father.

Cathal would become a King of Connacht, with opposition, before his death in 1202. The ultimate winner for the kingship was Conchobar's uncle, Cathal Crobdearg, who was his ultimate successor.

Of Conchobar's remaining known children:

- Mathghamhain mac Conchobar Maenmaige Ua Conchobair was killed in 1196.
- Muirchertach Tethbhach Ua Conchobair was killed in 1204.
- Donnchadh mac Conchobar Maenmaige Ua Conchobair was killed in 1207.
- Tadhg mac Conchobar Maenmaige Ua Conchobair was recorded as alive in 1210.
- Mael Seachlainn mac Conchobar Maenmaige Ua Conchobair was slain by Manus, the son of Turlough O'Conor, who had taken his house (by force) at Cloontuskert, in 1219.
- Aodh mac Conchobar Maenmaige Ua Conchobair died in 1224 on his return from Jerusalem and the River Jordan.

Preceded by Ruaidrí Ua Conchobair	King of Connacht; 1183–1189	Succeeded by Cathal Carragh Ua Conchobair

== Family Tree (simplified) ==
   Toirdelbach, King of Connacht, d.1156.
   |
   |______________
   |           | 
   |           |
   Ruaidhri Cathal Crobdearg, 1152–1224. 
   |             issue
   |______________________________________________
   |            |                  |         |
   |            |                  |         |  
Conchobar Toirdhealbhach Aodh Diarmait 
   |              issue     issue    issue
   |______________________________________________________________
   |       |             |      |              |          |     |
   |       |             |      |              |          |     |
   Cathal Mathghamhain Tadhg Muircheartach Donnchadh Aodh Maelsechlain
   |
   |
   Maelsechlainn
    killed 1212

== Sources ==
- Annals of Ulster
- Annals of the Four Masters
- Annals of Connacht
- O'Byrne, Emmet. War, Politics and the Irish of Lenister 1156–1606, 2004.
