= Conchobar ua nDiarmata =

Conchobar ua nDiarmata, Noble of Connacht and foster-son to Ruaidrí Ua Conchobair, died 1189.

== Annalistic references ==
From the Annals of the Four Masters:

- 1183 - Bec O'Hara, Lord of Leyny in Connaught, was treacherously slain by Conor, the grandson of Dermot, who was son of Roderic, in his own house, on Lough Mac Farry.
- 1189 - Conor, grandson of Dermot, was slain by Cathal Carragh, the son of Conor Moinmoy, in revenge of the death of his father.
- 1227 - Brian, the son of Conor O'Diarmada, was slain.
