= Cathal mac Domhnall Ó Conchobair =

Irish king

Cathal mac Domhnall Ó Conchobair (died 1324) was King of Connacht from 1318 to 1324. The Kings of Connacht were rulers of the cóiced (variously translated as portion, fifth, province) of Connacht, which lies west of the River Shannon, Ireland. However, the name only became applied to it in the early medieval era, being named after The Connachta.

== Family ==
Cathal's wife was Ailbhe and his daughter was Sadhbh (d.1373). Sadhbh married firstly Flaithbheartach mac Domnall Carrach O’Rourke, King of Breifne O’Rourke from 1346 to 1349 (d.1352) and secondly Niall Mág Samhradháin, chief of the McGovern Clan of Tullyhaw, County Cavan from 1340 until his death in 1359. Sadhbh's sons with Niall were Tighearnán Mór, Ruadhrí, Eóghan and CúChonnacht.

Preceded by Tairdelbach mac Aedh Ua Conchobair	King of Connacht; 1318–1324	Succeeded by Tairdelbach mac Aedh Ua Conchobair
