= Ruaidri na bhFeadh Ó Conchobair =

Rory na-bhFeadh mac Donough Ua Conchobair, King of Connacht 1316–1317.

From the Annals of the Four Masters:

A numerous army was led by William Burke into Sil-Murray; and O'Conor and the Sil-Murray, with many of the tribes and chiefs of Connacht, made peace with him. Mac Dermot, however, did not consent to make this peace; and Mac William for that reason afterwards made an incursion into Moylurg, committed great depredations about Ath-an-chip, and in Uachtar-tire, and burned and destroyed the whole country; but his men departed without fighting a battle, or obtaining pledges of submission. Rory, the son of Donough O'Conor, was afterwards deposed by Mac Dermot.

Turlough, the son of Hugh, son of Owen, son of Rory, son of Hugh, son of Cathal Crovderg, was inaugurated by the Connacians as their king.

Preceded by Felim mac Aedh Ua Conchobair	King of Connacht; 1316–1317	Succeeded by Tairdelbach mac Aedh Ua Conchobair
