= Mathghamhain mac Conchobar Maenmaige Ua Conchobair =

Mathghamhain mac Conchobar Maenmaige Ua Conchobair (died 1196) was Prince of Connacht.

Mathghamhain one of the seven sons of King Conchobar Maenmaige Ua Conchobair of Connacht (assassinated 1189). He was a grandson of King of Ireland, Ruaidrí Ua Conchobair.

The Annals of the Four Masters, sub anno 1196, state that "Mahon, the son of Conor Moinmoy, Roydamna of Connacht, was slain by O'More (Donnell) and the men of Leix, who attempted to prevent him from bearing off the spoil which he had taken from the English; but O'More was killed by Cathal Carrach, in revenge of him."

== Sources ==
- Annals of Ulster
- Annals of the Four Masters
- Annals of Connacht
- O'Byrne, Emmet. War, Politics and the Irish of Lenister 1156-1606, 2004.
