= Hugh McHugh Breifne O'Conor =

Hugh McHugh Breifne O'Conor (Irish: Aedh mac Aedh Breifneach Ua Conchobair) was king of Connacht, Ireland, in 1342. He was the last of the Clan Murtagh O'Conor to hold this position. He died in 1350, as the O'Connor Breifne (Ó Conchobar Brefnech), some eight years after being expelled. His father, a son of Cathal O'Connor had briefly made a bid for the kingship in 1309-10 from a power-base established in Breifne O'Rourke.

Preceded by Tairdelbach mac Aedh Ua Conchobair	King of Connacht; 1342–1350	Succeeded by Aedh mac Tairdelbach Ua Conchobair
