= Tadhg mac Conchobar Maenmaige Ua Conchobair =

Gaelic prince of Connacht (fl. 1210)

Tadhg mac Conchobar Maenmaige Ua Conchobair (fl. 1210) was Prince of Connacht.

Tadhg was one of the seven sons of King Conchobar Maenmaige Ua Conchobair of Connacht (assassinated 1189). He was a grandson of King of Ireland, Ruaidrí Ua Conchobair.

The Annals of the Four Masters, sub Anno 1210, state that "The hostages of Connacht arrived in Ireland, viz. Conor God O'Hara, Lord of Leyny; Dermot, son of Conor O'Mulrony; Finn O'Cormacan; and Aireachtach Mac Donough."

== Sources ==
- Annals of Ulster
- Annals of the Four Masters
- Annals of Connacht
- O'Byrne, Emmet. War, Politics and the Irish of Lenister 1156-1606, 2004.
