= Muirchertach Tethbhach =

Muirchertach Tethbhach Ua Conchobair (died 1204) was Prince of Connacht.

Muirchertach Tethbhach was one of the seven sons of King Conchobar Maenmaige Ua Conchobair of Connacht (assassinated 1189). He was a grandson of King of Ireland, Ruaidrí Ua Conchobair. His nickname denoted his fostering in Tethba.

The Annals of Ulster, sub anno 1204, state that "Muircertach of Tethbha, son of Conchubhar Maenmhuighe, son of Ruaidhri Ua Conchubhair, was killed by Diarmuid, son of Ruaighri and by Aedh, son of Ruaidhri, that is, two brothers of his own father."

== Sources ==
- Annals of Ulster
- Annals of the Four Masters
- Annals of Connacht
- O'Byrne, Emmet. War, Politics and the Irish of Lenister 1156-1606, 2004.
