= Mael Seachlainn mac Conchobar Maenmaige Ua Conchobair =

Mael Seachlainn mac Conchobar Maenmaige Ua Conchobair was Prince of Connacht. He died in 1219.

Mael Seachlainn was a son of King Conchobar Maenmaige Ua Conchobair of Connacht (assassinated 1189) and a grandson of King of Ireland, Ruaidrí Ua Conchobair.

The Annals of the Four Masters, sub anno 1219, state that "Melaghlin, the son of Conor Moinmoy, was slain by Manus, the son of Turlough O'Conor, who had taken his house (by force) at Cloontuskert."

== Sources ==
- Annals of Ulster
- Annals of the Four Masters
- Annals of Connacht
- O'Byrne, Emmet. War, Politics and the Irish of Lenister 1156-1606, 2004.
