= Donnchadh Conallagh Ua Conchobair =

Donnchadh Conallagh Ua Conchobair (died 1204) was a Prince of Connacht, Ireland.

Donnchadh was one of the seven sons of King Conchobar Maenmaige Ua Conchobair of Connacht (assassinated 1189). He was a grandson of King of Ireland, Ruaidrí Ua Conchobair.

The Annals of the Four Masters, sub anno 1207, state that "Egneghan O'Donnell set out upon a predatory excursion into Fermanagh, and seized upon cows; but a considerable muster of the men of Fermanagh pursued him, and slew O'Donnell, Lord of Tirconnell, tower of the warlike prowess and hospitality of the province in his time; and some others of his nobility were slain along with him. The following were the nobles who fell on this occasion: Gillareagh, the son of Kellagh O'Boyle; Donough Conallagh, the son of Conor Moinmoy; and Mahon, the son of Donnell Midheach (i.e. the Meathian) O'Conor. Many other heroes fell besides these."

== Sources ==
- Annals of Ulster
- Annals of the Four Masters
- Annals of Connacht
- O'Byrne, Emmet. War, Politics and the Irish of Lenister 1156-1606, 2004.
