= Cathal Carragh Ua Conchobair =

Cathal Carrach Ua Conchobair, anglicised as Cathal Carragh O'Conor, was king of Connacht from 1189 to 1202.

One of the seven sons of King Conchobar Maenmaige Ua Conchobair, his nickname carragh ('scabby') suggests he had some sort of skin disease. The identities of his mother and wife are unknown. He first came to prominence during the war of the rigdamnae in 1185, supporting his father in a three-way contest against Conchobair's father, King Ruaidhri of Connacht, and Ruaidhri's brother, Cathal Crobderg Ua Conchobair.

After his father's assassination in 1189, Cathal hunted down and killed the instigator, the mysterious Conchobar ua nDiarmata. Cathal became king but faced contention from Cathal Crobderg; the dynastic in-fighting aided the introduction of Anglo-Norman forces west of the Shannon, who were employed by both men.

Cathal was killed in battle at Corr Sliaib in the Curlew Mountains in 1202. He had at least one son, Melaghlin, who was killed ten years later.

Preceded by Conchobar Maenmaige Ua Conchobhair	King of Connacht; 1190–1202	Succeeded by Cathal Crobdearg Ua Conchobair
