= Aodh mac Conchobar Maenmaige Ua Conchobair =

Aodh mac Conchobar Maenmaige Ua Conchobair, Prince of Connacht and Irish Crusader, died 1219.

Aodh was the last surviving son of the seven sons of King Conchobar Maenmaige Ua Conchobair of Connacht (assassinated 1189). He was a grandson of King of Ireland, Ruaidrí Ua Conchobair.

The Annals of the Four Masters, sub anno 1224, state that "on his return from Jerusalem and the River Jordan." After his death, the family disappear from history.

== Sources ==
- Annals of Ulster
- Annals of the Four Masters
- Annals of Connacht
- O'Byrne, Emmet. War, Politics and the Irish of Lenister 1156-1606, 2004.
