= Toirdhealbhach Óg Donn Ó Conchobair =

Historic Irish king

Toirdhealbhach Óg Donn Ó Conchobair (Turlough O'Connor) (died 9 December 1406) was a King of Connacht, a kingdom which lies west of the River Shannon in Ireland. He was the son of Aedh mac Tairdelbach Ó Conchobair. Few single members of the Ó Conchobair dynasty were able to assume overall control of the three main clan septs after the 1380s. Toirdhealbhach was one of the last kings of Connacht, who were by his time reduced to their ancestral lands in County Roscommon.

Preceded by Cathal mac Ruaidri Ó Conchobair	King of Connacht; 1384–1406	Succeeded by Cathal mac Ruaidhri Ó Conchobair
