= Aedh mac Tairdelbach Ó Conchobair =

Aedh mac Tairdelbach Ua Conchobair was King of Connacht briefly in 1342, and died in 1345.

Preceded by Aedh mac Aedh Breifneach Ua Conchobair	King of Connacht; 1342–1342	Succeeded by Ruaidri mac Tairdelbach Ua Conchobair
