= Lordship of Ireland =

English-ruled territory in Ireland (1177–1542)

Coordinates: 53°20′N 6°15′W

Lordship of Ireland Dominium Hiberniae (Latin) Seygnurie de Hirlaunde (Norman) Tiarnas na hÉireann (Irish)
- 1177–1542
- Banner Coat of arms (Note: A commission of Edward IV into the arms of Ireland found these to be the arms of the Lordship. The blazon is Azure, three crowns in pale Or, bordure Argent. Typically, bordered arms represent the younger branch of a family or maternal descent.)

- The English lordship of Ireland (blue) at its greatest extent c. 1250.
- Status: Dependency of England
- Capital: Dublin; Carlow (1361–94) (Note: In this period Carlow Castle was the location of the Exchequer of Ireland, Court of Common Pleas and the Court of Exchequer.)
- Common languages: Irish (Note: Middle Irish (until the 13th century), Early Modern Irish (from the 13th century)); English (Note: Middle English (until the 15th century), Early Modern English (from the 15th century), including the Yola and Fingallian dialects); Anglo-Norman (used as an administrative language and by Hiberno-Norman elite till 15th century); Latin (administrative and liturgical) (Note: Medieval Latin (11th-14th century), Renaissance Latin (from the 14th century))
- Religion: Roman Catholic
- Government: Feudal monarchy
- Lord
  - 1177–1216: John (first)
  - 1509–1542: Henry VIII (last)
- Lord Deputy
  - 1177–1181: Hugh de Lacy (first)
  - 1529–1534: Henry FitzRoy (last)
- Legislature: Parliament
- Historical era: Middle Ages
  - Established: May 1177
  - Bruce campaign: 1315–1318
  - Crown of Ireland Act: June 1542
- Currency: Irish pound
Preceded by	Succeeded by
Gaelic Ireland	Kingdom of Ireland

The Lordship of Ireland, (Note: "Lordship of Ireland" is a modern name; it was not used as the name of the territory during its existence.) also referred to as the English lordship in Ireland or Anglo-Norman Ireland, was the part of Ireland ruled by the King of England (styled as "Lord of Ireland") and controlled by loyal Anglo-Norman lords from 1177 to 1542. The lordship was a dependency of England, created following the Anglo-Norman invasion of Ireland. As the Lord of Ireland was also the King of England, he was represented locally by a governor, variously known as the Justiciar, Lieutenant, or Lord Deputy.

In 1170 and 1171, Anglo-Norman lords conquered swathes of territory from the Gaelic Irish. King Henry II of England arrived in Ireland with a large army in 1171. The Anglo-Norman lords, several Irish kings, and the Irish church leadership submitted to him. Pope Adrian IV had allegedly issued a papal bull, Laudabiliter, granting Henry the right to invade Ireland to enforce the Gregorian Reform. The 1175 Treaty of Windsor acknowledged Henry as overlord of the conquered lands, and the High King of Ireland, Ruaidrí Ua Conchobair, as overlord of the rest of Ireland. However, in 1177 Henry made his son John "Lord of Ireland" and encouraged his subordinates to conquer more land. Thereafter, the kings of England claimed lordship over the whole island, but in reality the king's rule only ever extended to parts of the island. The rest of Ireland – later referred to as Gaelic Ireland – remained under the control of various Gaelic Irish kingdoms or chiefdoms, who were often at war with the Anglo-Normans.

The area under English rule and law grew and shrank over time, reaching its greatest extent in the late 13th and early 14th centuries. The English lordship then went into decline, brought on by a Scottish invasion in 1315–1318, a concurrent famine, and the Black Death of the 1340s. The fluid political situation and Norman feudal system allowed a great deal of autonomy for the Anglo-Norman lords in Ireland, who carved out earldoms for themselves and had almost as much authority as some of the native Gaelic kings. Some Anglo-Normans became Gaelicised and rebelled against the English administration. The English attempted to curb this by passing the Statutes of Kilkenny (1366), which forbade English settlers from taking up Irish law, language, custom and dress. From the 15th century, direct English rule in Ireland was limited to an area on the east coast called the English Pale. The period ended with the creation of the Kingdom of Ireland in 1542.

== History ==
=== Arrival of the Anglo-Normans ===
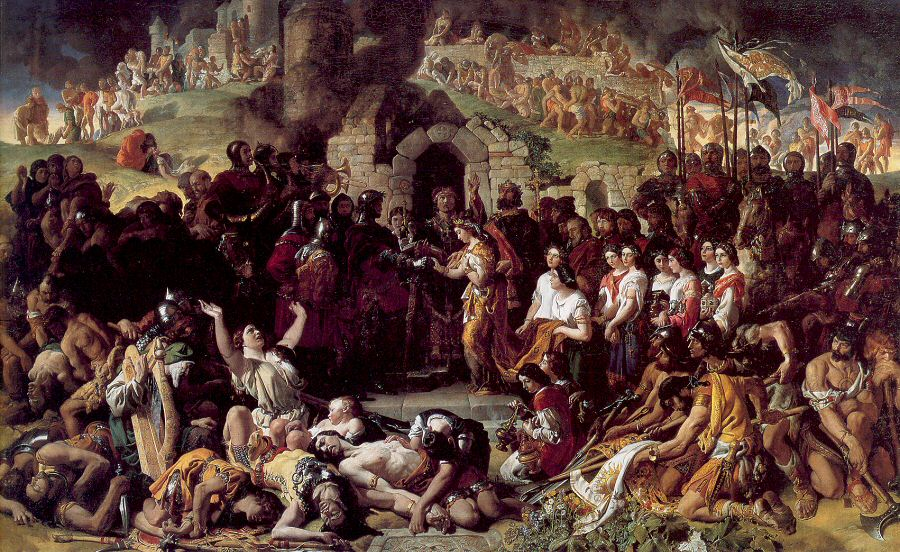
The Marriage of Strongbow and Aoife (1854), by Daniel Maclise

In May 1169, Anglo-Norman mercenaries landed in Ireland at the request of Diarmait mac Murchada (Dermot MacMurragh), the deposed King of Leinster, who sought their help in regaining his kingship. They achieved this within weeks and raided neighbouring kingdoms. This military intervention was sanctioned by King Henry II of England. In return, Diarmait had sworn loyalty to Henry and promised land to the Normans.

In 1170, there were further Norman landings, led by the Earl of Pembroke, Richard "Strongbow" de Clare. They seized the important Norse-Irish towns of Dublin and Waterford, and Strongbow married Diarmait's daughter Aoífe. Diarmait died in May 1171, and Strongbow claimed Leinster, which Diarmait had promised him. Led by High King Ruaidrí Ua Conchobair (Rory O'Conor), a coalition of most of the Irish kingdoms besieged Dublin, while Norman-held Waterford and Wexford were also attacked. However, the Normans managed to hold most of their territory.

=== Henry Plantagenet and Laudabiliter ===
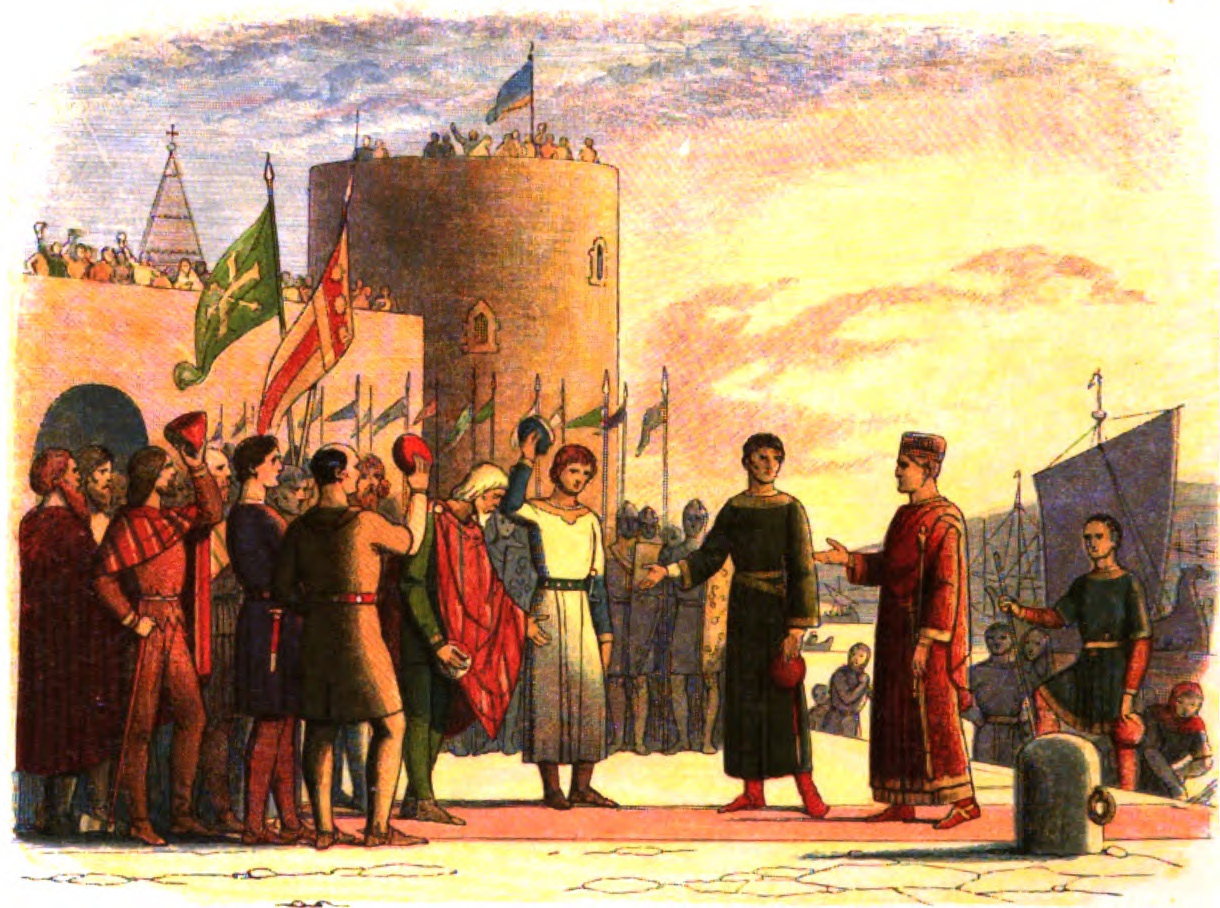
"Henry at Waterford", from A Chronicle of England (1864) by James Doyle

King Henry II and the Anglo-Normans in Ireland claimed that Pope Adrian IV had issued a papal bull, known as Laudabiliter, granting Henry the right to take control of the island to enforce reform of the Catholic Church in Ireland. Religious practices and ecclesiastical organisation in Ireland had diverged somewhat from those in areas of Europe influenced more directly by the Holy See, although many of these differences had been eliminated or greatly lessened by the time the bull was allegedly issued in 1155.

In October 1171, King Henry landed with a large army to assert control over both the Anglo-Normans and the Irish. This intervention was supported by the Roman Catholic Church, who saw it as a means of ensuring Irish religious reform, and a source of taxes. At the time, Irish marriage laws conflicted with those of the broader Church, and the Gregorian Reform had not been fully implemented. Henry granted Strongbow Leinster as a fiefdom, declared the Norse-Irish towns to be crown land, and arranged the synod of Cashel to reform the Irish church. Many Irish kings also submitted to him, likely in the hope that he would curb Norman expansion, but Henry granted the unconquered kingdom of Meath to Hugh de Lacy. After Henry's departure in 1172, fighting between the Normans and Irish continued.

In 1175 the Treaty of Windsor was agreed by Henry and Ruaidrí Ua Conchobair, High King of Ireland. It acknowledged Henry as overlord of the conquered lands and Ruaidrí as overlord of the rest of Ireland, with Ruaidrí also swearing fealty to Henry. The treaty soon collapsed: Anglo-Norman lords continued to invade Irish kingdoms and the Irish continued to attack the Normans.

=== John Lackland as Lord of Ireland ===
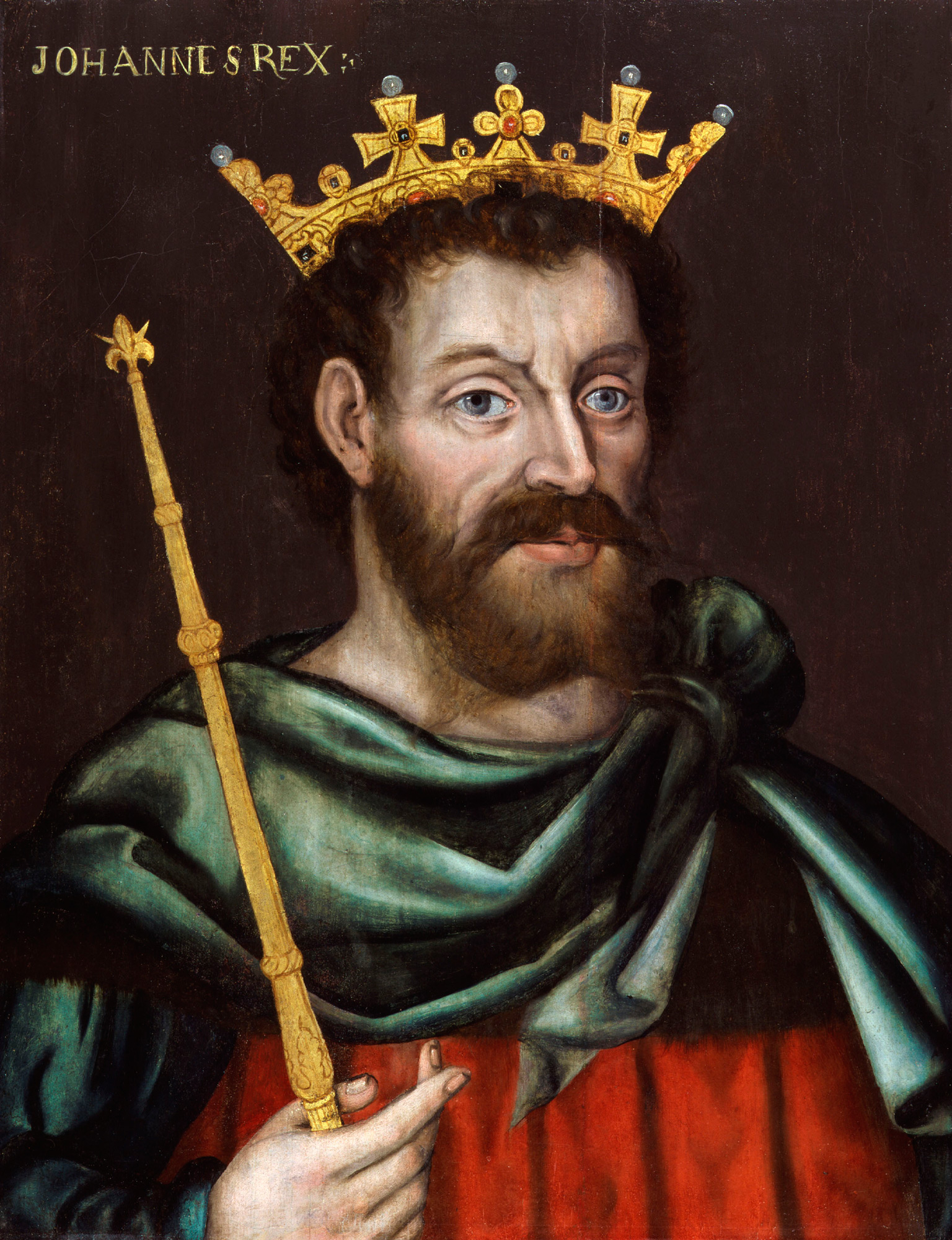
A 17th-century painting of King John of England, Lord of Ireland

Having captured a small part of Ireland on the east coast, Henry used the land to solve a dispute dividing his family. For he had divided his territories between his sons, with the youngest being nicknamed Johan sanz Terre (in English, "John Lackland") as he was left without lands to rule. At the Oxford parliament in May 1177, Henry replaced William FitzAldelm and granted John his Irish lands, so becoming Lord of Ireland (Dominus Hiberniae) in 1177 when he was 10 years old, with the territory being known in English as the Lordship of Ireland.

Henry had wanted John to be crowned King of Ireland on his first visit in 1185, but Pope Lucius III specifically refused permission, citing the dubious nature of a claim supposedly provided by Pope Adrian IV years earlier. Dominus (usually translated 'lord') was the usual title of a king who had not yet been crowned, suggesting that it was Henry's intention. Lucius then died while John was in Ireland, and Henry obtained consent from Pope Urban III and ordered a crown of gold and peacock feathers for John. In late 1185 the crown was ready, but John's visit had by then proved a complete failure, so Henry cancelled the coronation.

Following the deaths of John's older brothers he became King of England in 1199, and so the Lordship of Ireland, instead of being a separate country ruled by a junior Norman prince, came under the direct rule of the Angevin crown. In the legal terminology of John's successors, the "lordship of Ireland" referred to the sovereignty vested in the Crown of England; the corresponding territory was referred to as the "land of Ireland".

=== Peak of English power ===
The Lordship thrived in the 13th century during the Medieval Warm Period, a time of warm climate and better harvests. The Irish version of Magna Carta, the Great Charter of Ireland, gave rights to landowners from 1217. The feudal system was introduced, and the Parliament of Ireland first sat in 1297. Some counties were created by shiring, while walled towns and castles became a feature of the landscape. But little of this engagement with mainstream European life was of benefit to those the Normans called the "mere Irish". "Mere" derived from the Latin merus, meaning "pure". Environmental decay and deforestation continued unabated throughout this period, being greatly exacerbated by the English newcomers and an increase in population.

The Norman élite and churchmen spoke Norman French and Latin. Many poorer settlers spoke English, Welsh, and Flemish. The Gaelic areas spoke Irish dialects. The Yola language of County Wexford was a survivor of the early English dialects. The Kildare Poems of c. 1350 are a rare example of humorous local culture written in Middle English.

=== Decline and Gaelic resurgence ===
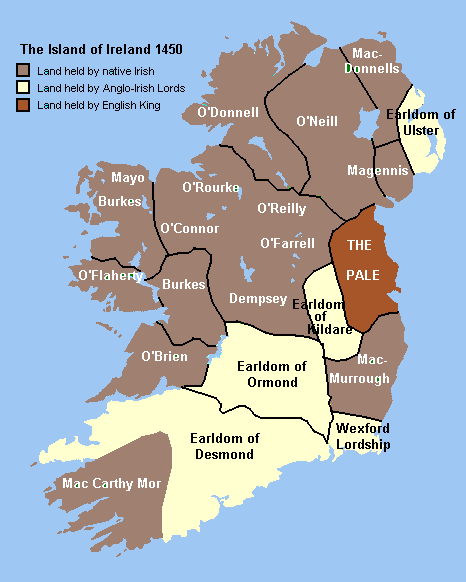
The Pale (grey) in 1450

The Lordship suffered invasion from Scotland by Edward Bruce in 1315–1318, which destroyed much of the economy and coincided with the great famine of 1315–1317.

The earldom of Ulster ended in 1333, and the Black Death of 1348–1350 impacted more on the town-dwelling Normans than on the remaining Gaelic clans.

The Norman and English colonists exhibited a tendency to adopt much of the native culture and language, becoming "Gaelicized" or in the words of some "more Irish than the Irish themselves". In 1366 the Statute of Kilkenny tried to keep aspects of Gaelic culture out of the Norman-controlled areas albeit in vain. As the Norman lordships became increasingly Gaelicized and made alliances with native chiefs, whose power steadily increased, Crown control slowly eroded.

Additionally, the English Lordship increasingly alienated the Irish chiefs and people on whom they often relied for their military strength. It had been a common practice for the Norman lords as well as government forces to recruit the native Irish who were allied to them or living in English controlled areas (i.e. Leinster including Meath and Ossory, Munster and some parts of Connacht). But the Irish chiefs became increasingly alienated by the oppressive measures of the English government and began openly rebelling against the Crown. Some of the more notable clans who had cooperated with the English but became increasingly alienated until turning openly anti-English were the O'Connor Falys, the MacMurrough-Kavanagh dynasty (Kingdom of Leinster), the Byrnes and the O'Mores of Leix. These clans were able to defend their territories against English attack for a long time through asymmetrical guerrilla warfare and devastating raids into the lands held by the colonists. Additionally, the power of native chiefs who had never come under English domination—such as the O'Neills and the O'Donnells—increased steadily until these became once again major power players on the scene of Irish politics.

Historians refer to a Gaelic revival or resurgence beginning after 1350. By the mid-15th century, direct English rule was largely restricted to a region on the east coast, the "four obedient shires" comprising most of counties Dublin, Kildare, Meath and Louth. This was the region in which English culture and English law were observed. In 1494, the Lord Deputy, Edward Poynings, ordered that defensive ditches be built around this territory, which was thereafter known as "the English Pale". English rule became restricted to the Pale, and some provincial towns, including Cork, Limerick, Waterford and Wexford.

Between 1500 and 1542 a mixed situation arose. Most clans remained loyal to the Crown most of the time, at least in theory, but using a Gaelic-style system of alliances based on mutual favours, centered on the Lord Deputy who was usually the current Earl of Kildare. The Battle of Knockdoe in 1504 saw such a coalition army fight the Burkes in Galway. However, a rebellion by the 9th Earl's heir Silken Thomas in 1535 led on to a less sympathetic system of rule by mainly English-born administrators. The end of this rebellion and Henry VIII's seizure of the Irish monasteries around 1540 led on to his plan to create a new kingdom based on the existing parliament.

=== Crown of Ireland Act 1542 ===
English monarchs continued to use the title "Lord of Ireland" to refer to their position of conquered lands on the island of Ireland. The title was changed by the Crown of Ireland Act passed by the Irish Parliament in 1542 when, on Henry VIII's demand, he was granted a new title, King of Ireland, with the state renamed the Kingdom of Ireland. Henry VIII changed his title because the Lordship of Ireland had been granted to the Norman monarchy by the Papacy; Henry had been excommunicated by the Catholic Church and worried that his title could be withdrawn by the Holy See. Henry VIII also wanted Ireland to become a full kingdom to encourage a greater sense of loyalty amongst his Irish subjects, some of whom took part in his policy of surrender and regrant.

Queen Mary I, one of Henry VIII's daughters, would take the English throne in 1553. As a Catholic, she sought to smooth relations with the Pope. Pope Paul IV would grant Philip II of Spain (Mary's husband) and Mary the title of King and Queen of Ireland in 1555, endorsing the position that the Tudors were indeed the rightful Irish monarchy. This grant would not work as Paul IV had expected, as Mary died in 1558 and was succeeded as Queen of England and Ireland by her half-sister Elizabeth I, a Protestant.

== Economy and culture ==
The arrival of the Normans altered the agricultural landscape of Ireland. Elements that appear afterwards include: large-scale hay-making; cultivated pears and cherries; larger white-fleeced breeds of sheep; and the introduction of various animals such as rabbits, perch, pike and carp.

Another economic effect was the widespread usage of coinage, originally introduced by the Vikings. In the late 1180s, during John's lordship, the first Norman coins in Ireland were minted. Other mints operated in the major towns, with De Courcy in Ulster even minting coins in his own name.

Whether as a direct consequence of the Normans or not, the commoner's independence decreased in both Norman and Gaelic areas. Where once they could serve more than one lord or even transfer from one lord to another, they were now unfree tenants bound to the land.

The Normans also instigated the widespread building of castles by aristocrats, a key component of the feudal system they brought to Ireland, and round towers. From 1169 until the mid-fourteenth century, castles were mostly associated with Norman lordships and formed the basis of new settlements. Not until after 1205, during the reign of King John, was a royal castle built in Ireland. However, as Prince, John's first expedition to Ireland in 1185, saw his direct involvement in building the "royal" Ardfinnan Castle and Lismore Castle.

De Courcy, who had conquered Ulaid, instigated a large-scale program of ecclesiastic patronage from 1179. This included the building of new abbeys and priories. He formally reburied in Downpatrick the recently "found" bodies of three prominent Irish saints—Patrick, Brigit and Columba—and commissioned a "Life of Patrick".

Whilst before the arrival of the Normans some Irish kings had recorded land transactions with monasteries, after their arrival, charters for land transactions became commonplace.

Whilst elements of English common law had been used by some Anglo-Normans in Ireland, a charter drawn up by John in 1210 introduced the principle of it being applied to Ireland.

== Parliament ==
The government was based in Dublin, but the members of Parliament could be summoned to meet anywhere, whether Dublin or Kilkenny:

- 1310 Kilkenny
- 1320 Dublin
- 1324 Dublin
- 1327 Dublin
- 1328 Kilkenny
- 1329 Dublin
- 1330 Kilkenny
- 1331 Kilkenny
- 1331 Dublin
- 1341 Dublin
- 1346 Kilkenny
- 1350 Kilkenny
- 1351 Kilkenny
- 1351 Dublin
- 1353 Dublin
- 1357 Kilkenny
- 1359 Kilkenny
- 1359 Waterford
- 1360 Kilkenny
- 1366 Kilkenny
- 1369 Dublin

== See also ==
- History of Ireland
  - History of Ireland 1169–1536
- Monarchy of Ireland § Lords of Ireland, 1177–1542
- Ireland King of Arms

== Sources ==
- Davies, Norman (1999), The Isles: A History, Palgrave-Macmillan, ISBN 0-333-76370-X
- Duffy, Seán (2005), Encyclopedia of Medieval Ireland, New York: Routledge, ISBN 9781135948245 – via Internet Archive
- Frame, Robin (1982), English Lordship in Ireland 1318–1361, Clarendon Press, ISBN 0-19-822673-X

Preceded by Gaelic Ireland	Lordship of Ireland	Succeeded by Kingdom of Ireland
