= History of Ireland (1169–1534) =

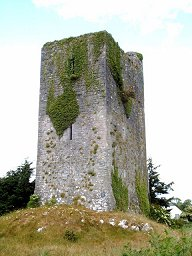
A tower house near Quin, County Clare. The Normans consolidated their presence in Ireland by building hundreds of castles and towers such as this

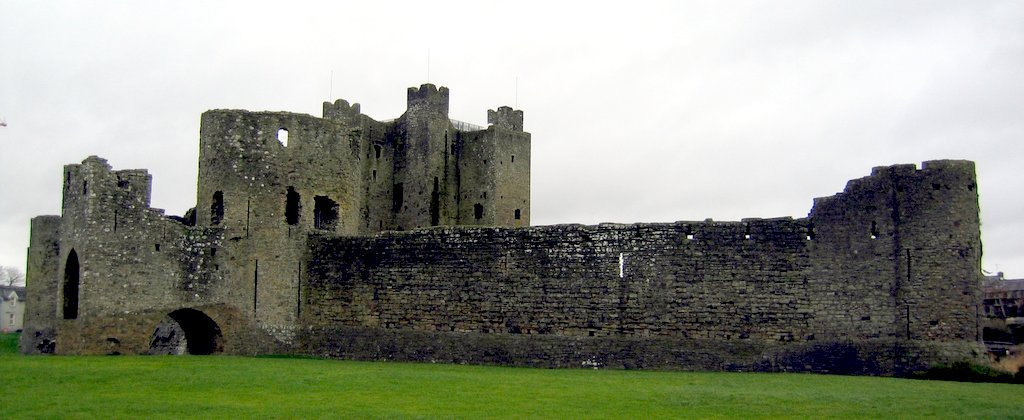
Trim Castle (1169-) is a major construction of this period

The history of Ireland from 1169–1534 covers the period from the arrival of the Cambro-Normans to the reign of Henry VIII of England, who made himself King of Ireland. After the Norman invasion of 1169–1171, Ireland was under an alternating level of control from Norman lords and the King of England. Previously, Ireland had seen intermittent warfare between provincial kingdoms over the position of High King. This situation was transformed by intervention in these conflicts by Norman mercenaries and later the English crown. After their successful conquest of England, the Normans turned their attention to Ireland. Ireland was made a lordship of the King of England and much of its land was seized by Norman barons. With time, Hiberno-Norman rule shrank to a territory known as the Pale, stretching from Dublin to Dundalk. The Hiberno-Norman lords elsewhere in the country became Gaelicised and integrated in Gaelic society.

== Arrival of the Normans (1167–1185) ==
By the 12th century, the historical Nation of Ireland consisted of trícha cét (a unit of land-holding) Tuatha (Clan territories) and cúige (Provinces), their rulers under Gaelic Brehon Law contending for the title Ard Rí (High King) of Ireland and for control of the whole country.

The Meic Lochlainn Kings of the North ruled the west and center of what is now Ulster, the east still held by the ancient Ulaid. The Kings of Mide still ruled, but the kingdom was frequently partitioned by the more powerful kingdoms all around it.

The kingship of Laigin (Leinster) was by this time held by Uí Cheinnselaig dynasty, who had replaced the Uí Dúnlainge. Osraige had by the 12th century been fully absorbed into Leinster, its ruler holding little power even within Osraige. Only south Munster was controlled by the MacCarthy dynasty, with the O'Brien dynasty of Thomond ruling all Munster, and providing at least two kings of Ireland. Connacht's supreme rulers were the Uí Chonchobhair. Between Connacht and Ulster and Mide lay the Kingdom of Breifne.

After losing the protection of Muircheartach Mac Lochlainn, High King of Ireland, who died in 1156, Dermot MacMurrough (Irish Diarmaid Mac Murchada), was forcibly exiled by a confederation of Irish forces under the new Ard Rí High king of Ireland , Ruaidrí Ua Conchobair.

MacMurrough fled first to Bristol and then to Normandy. He sought and obtained permission from Henry II of England to use the latter's subjects to regain his kingdom. By 1167 MacMurrough had obtained the services of Maurice Fitz Gerald and later persuaded Rhŷs ap Gruffydd, Prince of Deheubarth, to release Maurice's half-brother Robert Fitz-Stephen from captivity to take part in the expedition. Most importantly he obtained the support of Cambro-Norman Marcher Lord Richard de Clare, 2nd Earl of Pembroke, known as Strongbow.

The first Norman knight to land in Ireland was Richard fitz Godbert de Roche in 1167, but it was not until 1169 that the main forces of Normans, along with their Welsh and Fleming mercenaries, landed in Wexford. Within a short time Leinster was regained, Waterford and Dublin were under Diarmaid's control. He now had Strongbow as a son-in-law, after offering his eldest daughter Aoife to him in marriage in 1170, and named him as heir to his kingdom. This latter development caused consternation to King Henry II of England, who feared the establishment of a rival Norman state in Ireland. Accordingly, he resolved to visit Leinster to establish his authority.

=== Papal Bull and Henry II's invasion ===
Pope Adrian IV, the first (and only) English pope, in one of his earliest acts, had already issued a Papal Bull in 1155, giving Henry authority to invade Ireland as a means of curbing ecclesiastical corruption and abuses. Little contemporary use, however, was made of the Bull Laudabiliter since its text enforced papal suzerainty not only over the island of Ireland but over all islands off the European coast, including Britain, in virtue of the Constantinian donation. The relevant text reads: "There is indeed no doubt, as thy Highness doth also acknowledge, that Ireland and all other islands which Christ the Sun of Righteousness has illumined, and which have received the doctrines of the Christian faith, belong to the jurisdiction of St. Peter and of the holy Roman Church". References to Laudabiliter become more frequent in the later Tudor period when the researches of the renaissance humanist scholars cast doubt on the historicity of the Donation of Constantine. The debate was academic, as in 1172 Adrian's successor, Pope Alexander III, ratified the overlordship of Ireland to Henry, without however naming him as King of Ireland.

Henry landed with a large fleet at Waterford in 1171, becoming the first King of England to set foot on Irish soil. Both Waterford and Dublin were proclaimed Royal Cities. Henry awarded his Irish territories to his youngest son John with the title Dominus Hiberniae ("Lord of Ireland"). When John unexpectedly succeeded his brother as King John, the "Lordship of Ireland" fell directly under the English Crown.

Henry was happily acknowledged by most of the Irish Kings, who perhaps saw in him a chance to curb the expansion of both Leinster and the Hiberno-Normans. It is unclear if they saw him as a new and soon-to-be-absent high king, or understood the obligations of feudalism. This led to the ratification of the Treaty of Windsor (1175) between Henry and Ruaidhrí. However, with both Diarmaid and Strongbow dead (in 1171 and 1176), Henry back in England and Ruaidhrí unable to curb his nominal vassals, within two years it was not worth the vellum it was inscribed upon. John de Courcy invaded and gained much of east Ulster in 1177, Raymond FitzGerald (also known as Raymond le Gros) had already captured Limerick and much of north Munster, while the other Norman families such as Prendergast, fitz Stephen, fitz Gerald, fitz Henry, de Ridelsford, de Cogan, and le Poer were actively carving out virtual kingdoms for themselves.

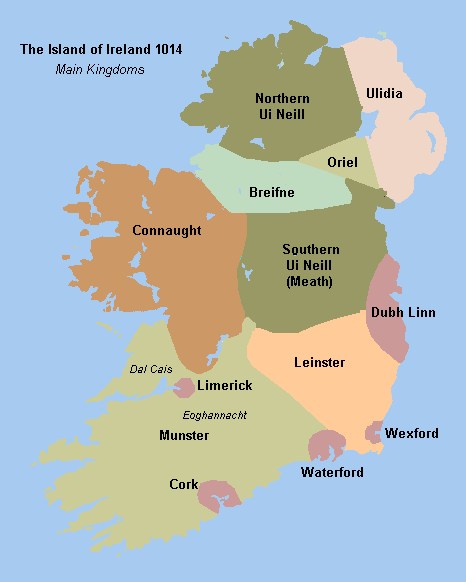
Ireland in 1014: a patchwork of rival kingdoms.

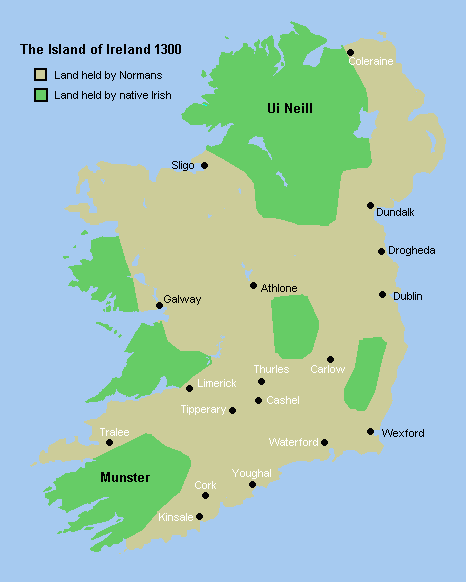
The extent of Norman control of Ireland in 1300.

=== Short-term impact of the invasion ===
What eventually occurred in Ireland in the late 12th and early 13th century was a change from acquiring lordship over men to colonising land. The Cambro-Norman invasion resulted in the founding of walled borough towns, numerous castles and churches, the importing of tenants and the increase in agriculture and commerce; these were among the many permanent changes brought by the Norman invasion and occupation of Ireland. Normans altered Gaelic society with efficient land use, introducing feudalism to the existing native tribal-dynastic crop-sharing system. Feudalism never caught on in large parts of Ireland, but it was an attempt to introduce cash payments into farming, which was entirely based on barter. Some Normans living further from Dublin and the east coast adopted the Irish language and customs, and intermarried, and the Irish themselves also became irrevocably "Normanised". Many Irish people today bear Norman-derived surnames such as Burke, Roche and Power, although these are more prevalent in the provinces of Leinster and Munster, where there was a larger Norman presence.

The system of counties was introduced from 1297, although the last of the counties of Ireland was not shired until 1610. As in England, the Normans blended the continental European county with the English shire, where the king's chief law enforcer was the shire-reeve (sheriff). Towns were perhaps the Normans' greatest contribution. Starting with Dublin in 1192, royal charters were issued to foster trade and to give extra rights to townspeople.

The church attempted to center congregations on the parish and diocese, not as formerly on abbeys, and built hundreds of new churches in 1172–1348. The first attempt to record Ireland's wealth at the parish level was made in the records of Papal Taxation of 1303 (Ireland's equivalent of the Domesday Book), which was required to operate the new tithing system. Regular canon law tended to be limited to the areas under central Norman control.

The traditional Irish legal system, the "Brehon Law", continued in areas outside central control, but the Normans introduced Henry II's reforms including new concepts such as prisons for criminals. The Brehon system was typical of other north European customary systems and required fines to be paid by a criminal and his family, the amount depending on the victim's status.

While the Norman political impact was considerable, it was untidy and not uniform, and the stresses on the Lordship in 1315–48 meant that de facto control of most of Ireland slipped from its grasp for over two centuries.

== Lordship of Ireland (1171–1300) ==
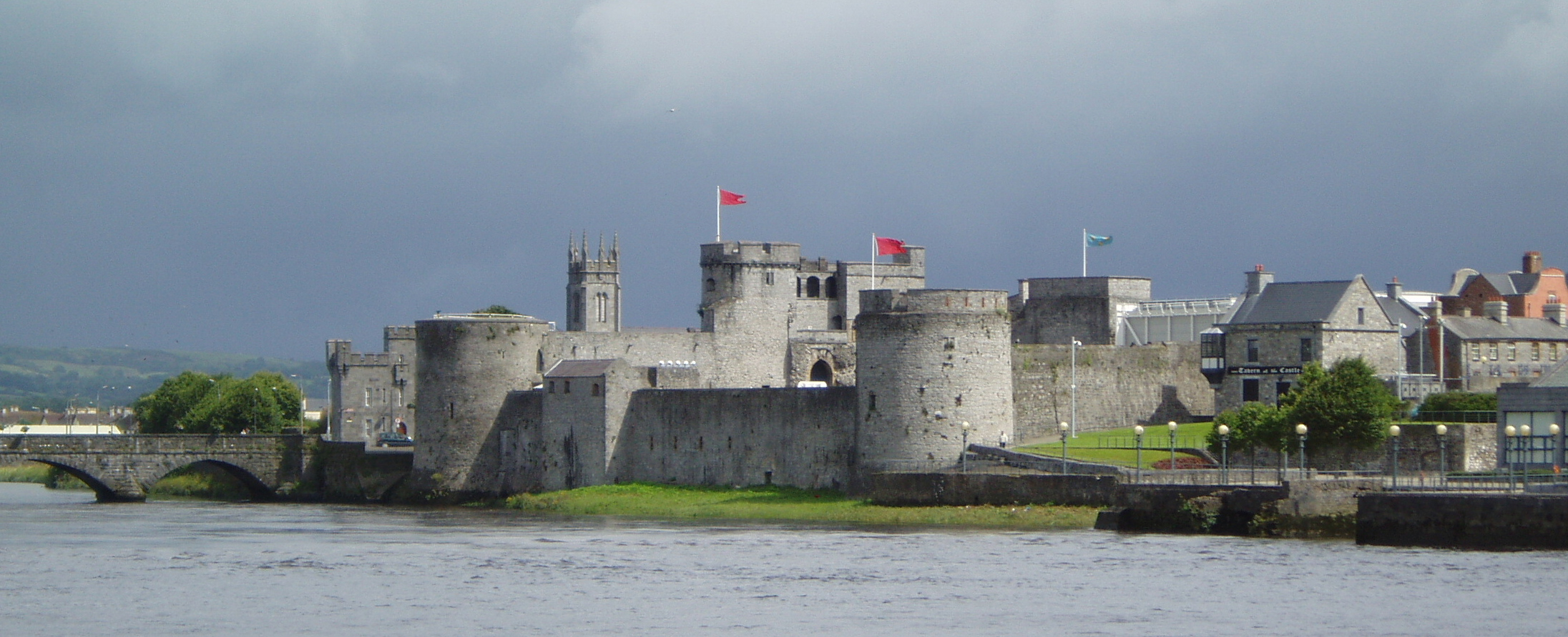
King John's Castle sits on the southern bank of the River Shannon. It was built in the 12th century on the orders of King John of England

Initially the Normans controlled large swathes of Ireland, securing the entire east coast, from Waterford up to eastern Ulster and penetrating as far west as Gaillimh (Galway) and Maigh Eo (Mayo). The most powerful forces in the land were the great Hiberno-Norman Earldoms such as the Geraldines, the Butlers and the de Burghs (Burkes), who controlled vast territories which were almost independent of the governments in Dublin or London. The Lord of Ireland was King John, who, on his visits in 1185 and 1210, had helped secure the Norman areas from both the military and the administrative points of view, while at the same time ensuring that the many Irish kings were brought into his fealty; many, such as Cathal Crobhdearg Ua Conchobair, owed their thrones to him and his armies.

The Normans also were fortunate to have leaders of the calibre of the Butler, Marshall, de Lyvet (Levett), de Burgh, de Lacy and de Braose families, as well as having the dynamic heads of the first families. Another factor was that after the loss of Normandy in 1204, John had a lot more time to devote to Irish affairs, and did so effectively even from afar.

== Norman decline (1300–1350) ==
The high point of the Norman lordship was the creation of the Parliament of Ireland in 1297, following the Lay Subsidy tax collection of 1292. The first Papal Taxation register was compiled in 1302–1307; it was the first Irish census and list of properties, similar to the Domesday Book. The Hiberno-Normans then suffered from a series of events in the 14th century that slowed, and eventually ceased, the spread of their settlement and power. Firstly, numerous rebellious attacks were launched by Gaelic lords upon the English lordships. Having lost pitched battles to Norman knights, to defend their territory the Gaelic chieftains now had to change tactics, and deal with the charging armoured knights. They started to rely on raids against resources, and surprise attacks. This stretched the resources of the Normans, reduced their number of trained knights, and often resulted in the chieftains regaining territory. Secondly a lack of direction from both Henry III and his successor Edward I (who were more concerned with events in Great Britain and their continental domains) meant that the Norman colonists in Ireland were to a large extent deprived of (financial) support from the English monarchy, limiting their ability to hold territory. Furthermore, the Normans' position deteriorated due to divisions within their own ranks. These caused outright war between leading Hiberno-Norman lords such as the de Burghs, FitzGeralds, Butlers and de Berminghams. Finally, the division of estates among heirs split Norman lordships into smaller, less formidable units—the most damaging being that of the Marshalls of Leinster, which split a large single lordship into five.

Politics and events in Gaelic Ireland served to draw the settlers deeper into the orbit of the Irish, which on occasion had the effect of allying them with one or more native rulers against other Normans.

Hiberno-Norman Ireland was deeply shaken by four events in the 14th century:

- The first was the invasion of Ireland by Edward Bruce of Scotland who, in 1315, rallied many of the Irish lords against the English presence in Ireland (see Irish-Bruce Wars). Although Bruce was eventually defeated in Ireland at the Battle of Faughart, near Dundalk, his troops caused a great deal of destruction, especially in the densely settled area around Dublin. In this chaotic situation, local Irish lords won back large amounts of land that their families had lost since the conquest and held them after the war was over. A few English partisans like Gilbert de la Roche turned against the English king and sided with Bruce, largely because of personal quarrels with the English monarchy.
- The European famine of 1315–17 affected Ireland as well. Irish ports were unable to import wheat and other crops, or other foods, as none were available to buy. This was compounded by widespread crop burnings during the Bruce Invasion.
- The third was the murder of William Donn de Burgh, 3rd Earl of Ulster in June 1333, resulting in his lands being split in three among his relations, with the ones in Connacht starting the Burke Civil War, rebelling against the Crown and becoming new Irish clans. This meant the loss of English authority in virtually all of Ireland west of the River Shannon. It would be well over two hundred years before the McWilliam Burkes, as they were now called, were again allied with Dublin Castle. In Ulster the O'Neill dynasty took over and renamed Clandeboye in the earldom's lands in County Down, and in 1364 they assumed the title King of Ulster.

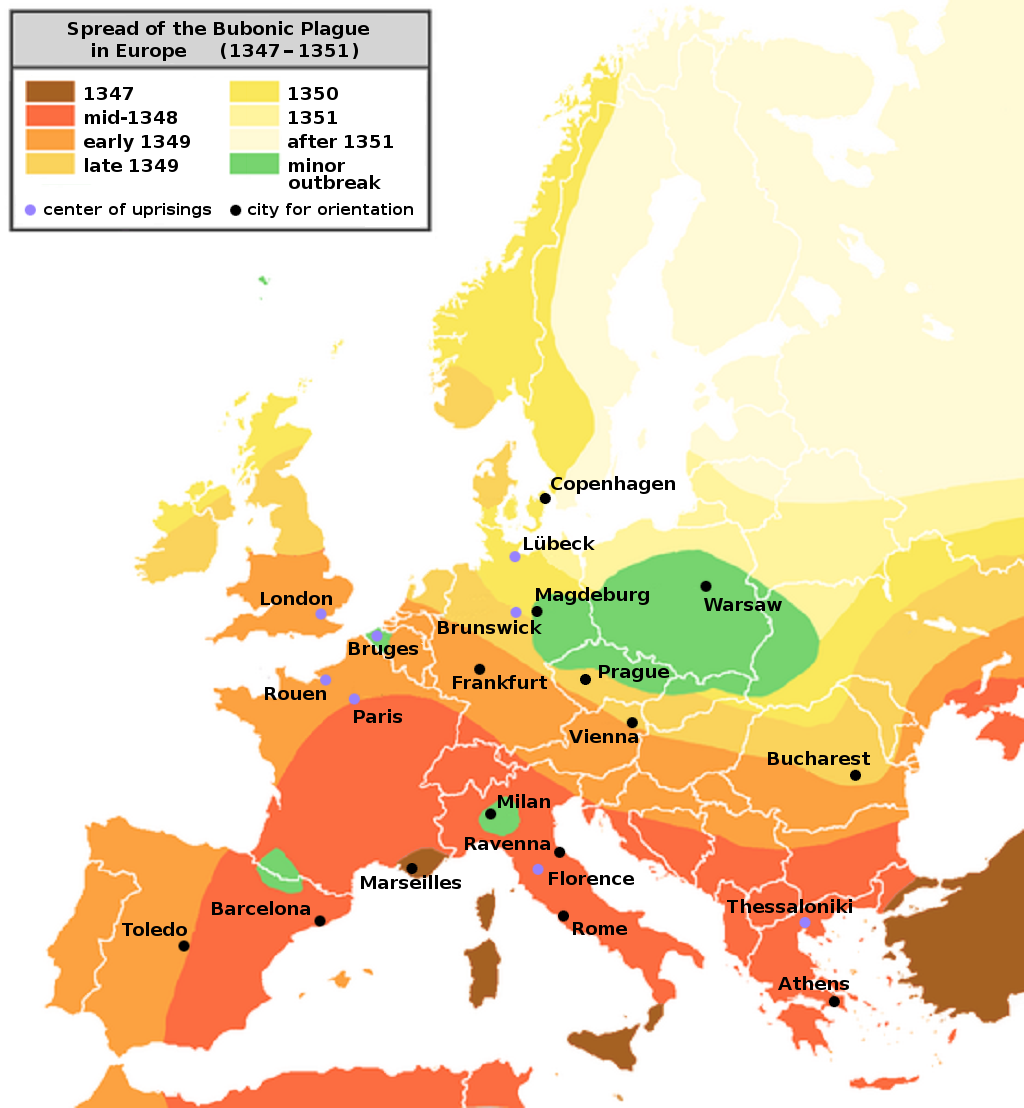
The Black Death rapidly spread along the major European sea and land trade routes. It reached Ireland in 1348 and decimated the Hiberno-Norman urban settlements

- The fourth calamity for the medieval English presence in Ireland was the Black Death, which arrived in Ireland in 1348. Because most of the English and Norman inhabitants of Ireland lived in towns and villages, the plague hit them far harder than it did the native Irish, who lived in more dispersed rural settlements. A celebrated account from a monastery in Cill Chainnigh (Kilkenny) chronicles the plague as the beginning of the extinction of humanity and the end of the world. The plague was a catastrophe for the English habitations around the country and, after it had passed, Irish language and customs returned to dominance. The English-controlled area shrank back to the Pale, a fortified area around Dublin.

In the background the Hundred Years' War of 1337–1453 between the English and French dynasties drew off forces that could have protected the Lordship from attack by autonomous Gaelic and Norman lords.

== Gaelic resurgence (1350–1500) ==
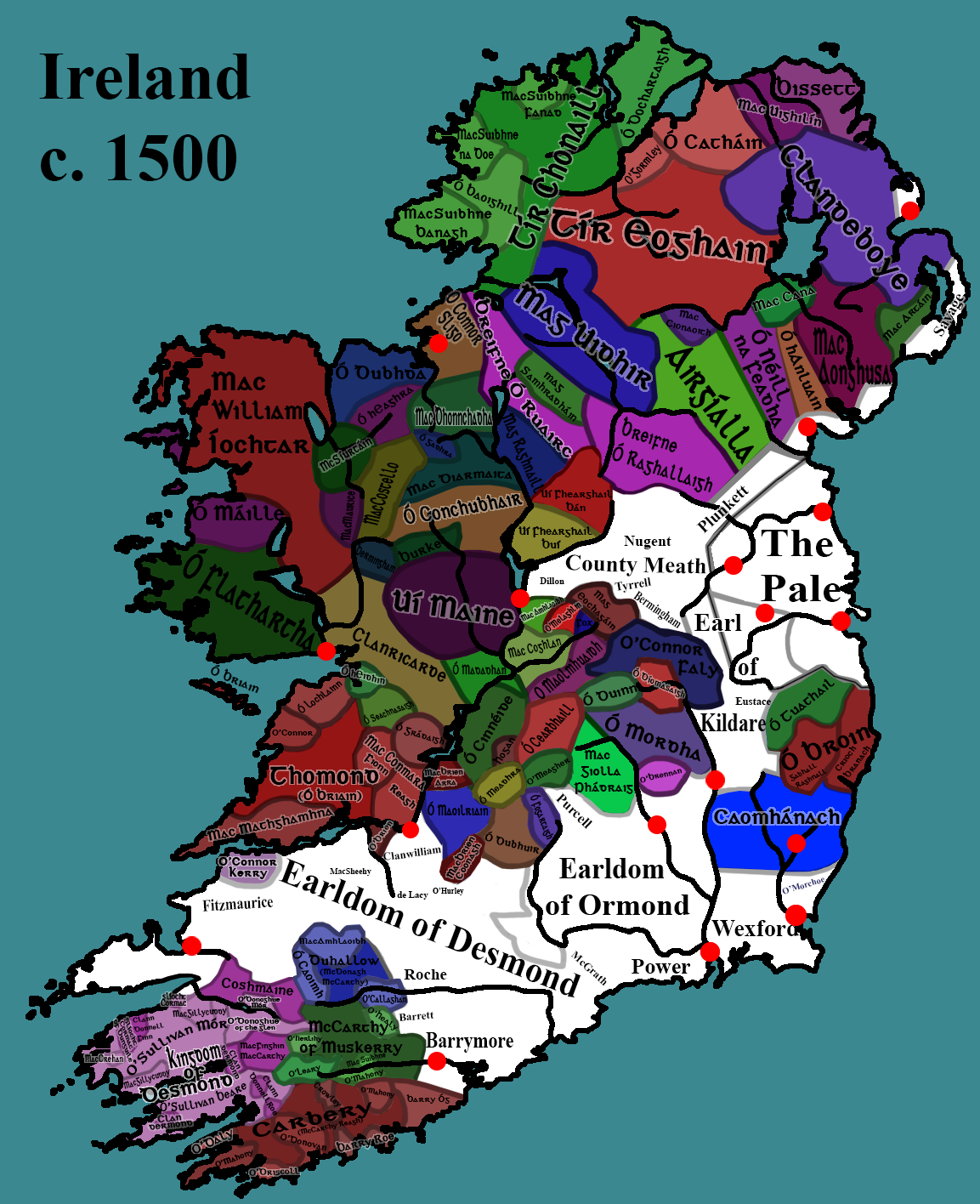
Ireland at the beginning of the Tudor period.

Additional causes of the Gaelic revival were political and personal grievances against the Hiberno-Normans, but especially impatience with procrastination and the very real horrors that successive famines had brought. Pushed away from the fertile areas, the Irish were forced into subsistence farming on marginal lands, which left them with no safety net during bad harvest years (such as 1271 and 1277) or in a year of famine (virtually the entire period of 1311–1319).

Outside the Pale, the Hiberno-Norman lords adopted the Irish language and customs, becoming known as the Old English, and in the words of a phrase coined in later historiography, became "more Irish than the Irish themselves." Over the following centuries they sided with the indigenous Irish in political and military conflicts with England and generally stayed Catholic after the Reformation. The authorities in the Pale grew so worried about the Gaelicisation of Ireland that, in 1367 at a parliament in Kilkenny, they passed special legislation (known as the Statutes of Kilkenny) banning those of English descent from speaking the Irish language, wearing Irish clothes or inter-marrying with the Irish. Since the government in Dublin had little real authority, however, the Statutes did not have much effect.

Throughout the 15th century, these trends proceeded apace and central government authority steadily diminished. The monarchy of England was itself thrown into turmoil during the last phase of the Hundred Years' War to 1453, and the Wars of the Roses (1460–85), and as a result, direct English involvement in Ireland was greatly reduced. Successive kings of England delegated their constitutional authority over the lordship to the powerful Fitzgerald earls of Kildare, who held the balance of power by means of military force and widespread alliances with lords and clans. This, in effect, made the English Crown even more remote to the realities of Irish politics. At the same time, local Gaelic and Gaelicised lords expanded their powers at the expense of the Pale, creating a policy quite alien to English ways and which was not fully overthrown until the Tudor re-conquest of Ireland.

== See also ==
- The Deeds of the Normans in Ireland
- History of Ireland
