= Dubh Chablaigh ingen Áed =

Queen of Munster (died 1088)

Dubh Chablaigh ingen Áed (died 1088) was Queen of Munster.

== Background ==
Dubh Chablaigh was a daughter of King Áed in Gai Bernaig of Connacht (died 1067). Her siblings included Cú Chonnacht, Tadg (d. 1062), Murchad Liathnach (d. 1069), Cathal (d. 1082), Niall Odar (d. 1105), and Ruaidrí na Saide Buide (died 1118), who was King of Connacht from 1087 to 1092.

Her namesake and grand-aunt, Dub Chablaigh ingen Cathal, was the fourth wife of Brian Boru and thus Empress of the Irish upon her death in 1009. She was in turn great-great grandaunt of Dubhchobhlaigh Bean Ua hEaghra, Queen of Luighne Connacht (died 1131) and great-great-great grandaunt of Dub Coblaigh Ní Conchobhair, Queen of Cenél Conaill (drowned 1153), all of whom were her namesakes.

== Marriage and issue ==
Dubh Chablaigh became the wife of Toirdelbach Ua Briain (1009 – 14 July 1086), King of Munster and High King of Ireland.

She may have been the mother of Dub Coblaig Ní Briain, Princess of Thomond (died 1095) who bore her name. Tairrdelbach's daughter, Mór, married Dubh Chablaigh's brother, King Ruaidrí na Saide Buide, though Mór may have been her step-daughter rather than biological daughter.

Dubh Chablaigh is however acknowledged as the mother of Diarmait Ua Briain (1060–1118), who ruled Munster on three occasions and from whom many subsequent Kings of Munster and all Kings of Thomond would descend.

== Family tree ==
  Áed in Gai Bernaig
  |
  |____________________________________________________________________________________________
  |                        |              |      |                   |         |             |
  |                        |              |      |                   |         |             |
  Dubh Chablaigh     Cú Chonnacht   Tadg   Murchad Liathnach   Cathal    Niall Odar    Ruaidrí na Saide Buide
 =Toirdelbach Ua Briain                   d.1062     d.1069.         d.1082.   died 1105.          died 1118.
  |
  |_________________________________________
  |             |                          |
  |             |                          |
  Diarmait      Dub Coblaig?, d. 1095.     Mór?, d. 1088.
  |                                       =Ruaidrí na Saide Buide
  |                                        |
  Kings of Munster and Thomond.            |
                                           Kings of Connacht.

== See also ==
- Dubhchobhlaigh
