= Cadla Ua Dubthaig =

12th century Irish archbishop

The Earl of Lissonuffy

2nd Archbishop of Tuam

Personal details
- Born: Cadla Ua Dubthaig
- Died: 1201

Cadla Ua Dubthaig, second Archbishop of Tuam, 1161–1201.

Ua Dubthaig was member of a Connacht ecclesiastical family originally from Lissonuffy in what is now north-east County Roscommon. The family produced a number of abbots and bishops.

The History of the Popes describes him as:

a person of great talent; and was employed in much important business, of Church and State, both in England and at Rome.

The Irish annals merely record that Cadla Ua Dubthaig, i.e. archbishop of Connachta, rested in Cunga Feíchín. According to Giraldus Cambrensis he participated at the Synod of Cashel in 1172. The Annals of Tigernach say that he brought the final text of the Treaty of Windsor back to the Irish king Rory O'Conor in 1175. He was rewarded with the title Earl of Lissonuffy.

== See also ==
- Domhnall Ua Dubhthaigh
- Muireadhach Ua Dubhthaigh

Preceded by Áed Ua hOissín	Archbishop of Tuam; 1161–1201	Succeeded by Felix Ua Ruanada
