= Áed Ua hOissín =

Irish bishop

Áed Ua hOissín (Hugh O'Hession) was consecrated first Archbishop of Tuam in 1152 and died in 1161. He was closely associated with Connacht royalty, and had served as abbot of Tuam.

== Biography ==
Ua hOissín was the first Archbishop of Tuam and one of four bishops granted pallia at the Synod of Kells by the papal legate Cardinal Archbishop Giovanni Paparoni in 1152. He played a part in the period of Cistercian-inspired church reform initiated by St Malachy immediately before the Anglo-Norman invasion of Ireland.

He came from a family with some church connections: Aed Ua Oisin was also the name of a coarb of Iarlaith of Tuam (abbot of Jarlath's Monastery) in the late 11th century – this abbot is said to have died in 1085. With other clergy he actively intervened in the affairs of Connaught and Ireland more broadly, and though Connaught wasn't a centre of Cistercian inspired reform he was part of a renewal of the Church centred on the refoundation of Tuam by Tairrdelbach Ua Conchobair in 1128. He was both preceded and succeeded as chief Bishop of Connacht by members of the prominent ecclesiastical family of Ó Dubhthaigh. O hOisins or Hession's still live in and around Tuam today.

== Politics ==
Ua Oisin was closely connected with kings Toirdelbach Ua Conchobair and Ruaidrí Ua Conchobair, Kings of Connaught and High Kings of Ireland. He is associated, as Abbot of Tuam (and therefore prior to his accession), with a spectacular High Cross in Tuam, which honours King Toirdelbach. (Note: For Association of the Turlough, Hugh and the High Cross see Petrie, Hourihane and Edwards) The High Cross is inscribed with the message

"A prayer for O'Ossin; for the Abbot; by whom it was made"

He is probably one of the few 12th century Irishmen whose image survives on a monument. (Note: The High Cross in Tuam (as seen in this picture from the Galway Public Library) was reassembled by George Petrie in the 1820s with the help of one Martin Hession, a resident of the town of Tuam.) See Petrie

== Abbot of Tuam/Coarb of Iarlaith ==
It's unclear when Áed first became Abbot of Tuam, but it's clear his predecessor Muirgius ua Nioc, superior of Tuaim dá Gualann, died in Inis in Ghaill (Inchagoill) on Loch Corrib in 1128. Áed had probably succeeded by that time and is therefore probably the successor of St Jarlath who took part in the refoundation of Tuam with Toirdhealbhach Ó Conchobhair the same year, and referred to in the Annals of Tighernach

1127 Toirdhealbhach Ó Conchobhair, overking of Ireland, and the successor of St Iarlaithe surround the (common) of Tuam from the southern end of Clad in Renda to Fidmag. Then the king gave an offering of land from himself to the church in perpetuity from Áth mBó to Caill Clumain, that is, the south-western half of the western part of Cluain, to every good cleric of the Síol Muireadhaigh who should dwell in Tuam, and the other half of it, at the guesthouse of Tuam, into the hands of the prior.

In 1134 as Abbot of Tuam, the Annals of Innisfallen and Annals of Tighernach record that he was sent by Toirdelbach with Muireadhach Ua Dubhthaigh then Bishop to make peace with Munster following a raid on Tuam by the O'Briens and their allies..

1134 Peace was made by Mugh's Half with Connacht, at the demand of Muireadhach Ua Dubhthaigh, i.e., archbishop of Ireland, and of a son of virginity, a successor of St Iarlaithe, to wit, Aodh Ó hOisín.(Annals of Tighernach).

As part of these negotiations the Abbey of St Finbarr of Cork was re-established with a church for Connaught Pilgrims, and Gilla Áedha Ua Maigín as Abbot. St Finbarr himself was the son of Amergin of Maigh Seóla near Tuam, and according to Mac Carthaigh's Book, Gilla Aedha (named for Aedh Ua Oisin), who was also present at the Synod of Kells, died in 1173.

In 1135, according to the Annals of the Four Masters, he became a guarantor for Toirdhealbhach's son Ruaidrí Ua Conchobair (the last High King of Ireland), who Toirdhealbhach had taken hostage.

1135 Ruaidri Ua Conchobhair and Uada Ua Concheanainn were taken prisoners by Toirdhealbhach Ua Conchobhair, they being under the protection of the successor of Iarlath and Ua Dubhthaigh, and of the Bachall Buidhe, i.e., the yellow staff or crozier, and Ua Domhnallian.

In 1143 Ua Oisin was again a guarantor with Ua Dubthaig of Ruaidrí Ua Conchobair, and protested his arrest at a Synod of 12 Bishops and 500 priests, though Ruaidri was only released in 1144. This same year he also took part in a peace conference between Ua Conchobair and Ua Brian at Tir da Ghlas.

A conference of peace between Toirdhealbhach Ua Conchobhair and Toirdhealbhach Ua Briain, at Tir-da-ghlas, with the chiefs of Munster and Connaught, both laity and clergy; and they made forms of peace according to what the clergy ratified between them.

== Archbishop of Tuam ==
During the first half of the 12th century, the post of Archbishop/Bishop of Connacht had been held by Ua hOissin's predecessors – Cathasach Ua Conaill (died 1117), Domhnall Ua Dubhthaigh (1117–1136), Muireadhach Ua Dubhthaigh (1136–1150). His investiture as Archbishop in 1152 was the culmination of a long negotiation by St Malachy of Armagh to secure reform of the Irish Church and settle the appointment of metropolitans by the pope, Eugenius III. St Malachy died in 1148 on his mission to secure the palia – in the arms of St Bernard of Clairvaux. (Note: The pallia was a symbol of office. The initial plan was apparently to secure two palia for Armagh and Cashel, but the claims of Toirdelbach, and Dublin's link to Canterbury meant ultimately Tuam and Dublin were conceded metropolitan status. See Pallium.)

Initially, the papal legate Giovanni Paparoni was refused passage to Ireland by King Stephen of England in 1150, probably to protect Canterbury's traditional claim over Dublin. But he returned in 1151, with Christian Ua Conairce, a Cistercian colleague of the Pope, who became the first Abbot of Mellifont, Bishop of Lismore, and the next papal legate. He was given safe passage by King David I of Scotland and spent some months in Ireland, at Armagh and elsewhere confirming the settlement before convening the Synod of Kells at Kells and subsequently near Drogheda at Mellifont. Aubrey Gwynn concludes that Ua Oisin was not a Bishop immediately prior to his investiture as the first Archbishop of Tuam and of Connacht. As a result, he is not named but was rather one of the five candidate bishops mentioned at Kells, and received his pallium as Archbishop later at Mellifont on Palm Sunday.

In 1156, and after King Toirdelbach's death, he was prevented from joining a Synod called by the Ua Mael Sechlainn Kings of Mide by representatives of the king. At this Synod the successor of Colum-Cille head of the Columban Churches, Flaithbheartach Ua Brolchain, was given episcopal status. A Synod of Connaught for clergy was held in Roscommon instead.

There was a convocation of all the clergie in Ireland at Breyuick Teige. The bisshopps of Connaught with the archbishop, hugh o'Nosyn (Hugh Hession) took their jorny to come thither & as they wer passing towards clonvicknose with 2 cowarbs of St Queran in theire company, and as they were comeing to the joysts or wodden bridge over the Syenn at Clonvicknos called Curr Clwanam, they were mett by the Rebell Carpreach the swift and his Kearne, whoe killed two laymen, and robbed the clergie, and did not suffer them to goe neer the said convocation, for another cause he had himself.

According to the Annals of Ulster these were agents of Ua Mael Sechlainn.

But, also according to the Annals of Ulster, he returned to Mellifont where he received his Pall for its consecration in 1157.

The successor of Patrick (namely, the archbishop of Ireland) consecrated the church of the Monks of Mellifont, near Drogheda, in presence of the clergy of Ireland, that is, of the Legate and of Ua Osein (Hession) and of Grenne and of the other bishops and in presence of many of the laity, around Muirchertach Mac Lochlainn, that is, around the king of Ireland and Donnchadh Ua Cerbaill and Tigernan Ua Ruairc.

== Death ==
Hession died in 1161 and was succeeded by Cadla Ua Dubthaig. Hession was considered sufficiently deserving to be buried in a magnificent marble tomb that survived until the mid-16th century. A new street has recently been named in his honour in Tuam.

== Notes ==
Catholic Church titles
Preceded by New creation	Archbishop of Tuam; 1152–1161	Succeeded by Cadla Ua Dubthaig
