= Cobhlaith =

Cobhlaith (older spelling: Cobhfhlaith) is an Irish language female given name believed to mean 'victorious sovereignty'. This name was relatively common in the early Irish period and has on occasion been anglicised as 'Cowley'. People with the name include:

- Cobhlaith ingen Canonn
- Cobhlaith ingen Ceallaich Cualann, Princess of Leinster
- Cobhlaith ingen Cathail, Abbess of Cluana Cuibhtin
- Cobhlaith ingen Duibh Duin, Abbess of Kildare
- Cobhlaith Mór Ní Conchobhair, Princess of Connacht
