= Cobhlaith Mór Ní Conchobhair =

Cobhlaith Mór Ní Conchobhair, Gaelic Lady, died 1395, Ireland.

== Biography ==
Cobhlaith Mór was a member of the Uí Chronchobair dynasty, whose Síol Muireadaigh ancestors had been Kings of Connacht since the 7th century. Her father, Cathal mac Domhnall Ó Conchobair, reigned 1318–24 and was the first Ó Conchobhair Sligigh; his ancestor, Tairrdelbach Ua Conchobair (died 1156), was one of the last native Kings of Ireland

Ní Conchobhair was an affluent Irish woman and the preserver of Gaelic customs at a time when they were being undermined by Edward III of England. In 1367, Gaelic traditions had been declared illegal by the Statutes of Kilkenny.

Her obituary states she was married to the following Gaelic kings:

1. Niall Ó Domhnaill, King of Tír Chonaill
2. Aodh Ó Ruairc, King of Breifne
3. Cathal mac Aedh Breifneach Ó Conchobair, a ríoghdhamhna and brother to Aedh mac Aedh Breifneach Ó Conchobair, king in 1342.

In the Annals of the Kingdom of Ireland, Mor is referred to as "Port na-d-Tri Namhat" (trns. the port or harbor of three enemies) because her three husbands were enemies of one another.

She was interred in the monastery of Boyle.

== See also ==
- Dub Chablaigh ingen Cathal, Empress of the Irish, died 1009.
- Dubhchobhlaigh Bean Ua hEaghra, Queen of Luighne Connacht, died 1131.
- Rose Ní Conchobair, Lady of Meath, fl. 1180.
- Mor Ni Conchobair, Queen of Munster, died 1190.
- Nuala Ní Conchobair, Queen of Ulaid, died 1226
