= Muireadhach Ua Dubhthaigh =

Muireadhach Ua Dubhthaigh (fl. c. 1075–1150) was an Archbishop of Connacht, in Ireland.

== Background ==
A member of a Connacht ecclesiastical family, Ua Dubhthaigh was born during the reign of King Áed Ua Ruairc (r. 1067–1087). His family were natives of Lissonuffy in what is now north-east County Roscommon, and produced a number of abbots and bishops.

One such was Flannagan Ruadh Ua Dubhthaigh, listed in his obituary of 1097 as "successor of Comman, and lector of Tuaim-da-ghualann".

Other Ó Dubhthaigh who held high church offices included:

- Domnall mac Flannacáin Ua Dubthaig (died 1136) and Flannacán Ua Dubthaig (dead by 1152), Bishops of Elphin;
- Dubthaigh Ó Dubhthaigh, Abbot of Cong, died 1223
- Muiredach Ua Dubthaig (fl. 1208), Bishop of Killala
- Uilliam Ó Dubhthaigh, OFM (fl. 1290–1297), Bishop of Clonmacnoise
- Céle Ua Dubthaigh (died 1210), Bishop of Mayo.
- Cadla Ua Dubthaig (fl. 1167–1201), Archbishop of Tuam.

== Archbishop of Connacht ==
At the Synod of Rathbreasail in 1118, Tuam was named as the seat of a diocese corresponding roughly with the diocese of Elphin, whilst Cong was chosen as the seat of a diocese corresponding with the later archdiocese of Tuam in Iar Connacht. No bishop was given the title "bishop of Tuam" in the Irish annals before 1152, although the annals recorded some "bishops of Connacht".

Domhnall Ua Dubhthaigh, who died at Clonmacnoise in 1136, is recorded in the Irish annals as "Archbishop of Connacht, and successor of Ciaran, head of the wisdom and hospitality of the province". It is unclear if he had retired, as Muireadhach was recorded as Archbishop in 1134.

The Archbishop of Connacht appears to have been the forerunner of the archdiocese of Tuam, which was established at the Synod of Kells in 1152. Muiredhach's successor as first Archbishop of Tuam was Áed Ua hOissín (1152–1161).

== Ambassador of Connacht ==
In 1134 Ua Dubhthaigh acted as ambassador of King Tairrdelbach Ua Conchobair to Cormac Mac Carthaigh, King of Munster, who had "again assembled the Munstermen, Leinstermen, Conmhaicne, the men of Midhe, the Galls of Dublin, Waterford, Wexford and Cork, and the Uí Eachach and Corca Laoighdhe on sea, to proceed into Connacht." Ua Dubhthaigh was successful in brokering a peace deal "between Leath Cuinn and Leath Mogha. Cormac made peace with Toirdhealbhach in honour of the archbishop, and he himself went to Abhall Ceithearnaigh to confirm the peace with Toirdhealbhach."

This Treaty of Abhall Ceithearnaigh brought an end to a bitter war for supremacy between Connacht and Munster that had been on-going since the 1120s, and had the previous year resulted in the destruction of the castle and fleet of Dun Gallimhe, and Mac Carthaigh's defeat of Conchobhar Ua Flaithbheartaigh at the battle of An Cloidhe.

== Surety for Ruaidhri Ua Conchobair ==
Following the treaty, Tairdelbach faced rebellion from his sons Aed and Ruaidhri. "Ruaidhri Ua Conchobhair and Uada Ua Concheanainn were taken prisoners by Toirdhealbhach Ua Conchobhair, they being under the protection of the successor of Iarlath and Ua Dubhthaigh, and of the Bachall Buidhe i.e. the yellow staff or crozier, and Ua Domhnallian." Muireadh's intercession seems to have saved Ruaidhri, though both Aedh and Ua Concheannain were blinded.

In 1143, the same crisis played out again:

His own son, i.e. Ruaidhri, was taken by Toirdhealbhach Ua Conchobhair, in violation of laity and clergy, relics and protection. These were the sureties: Muireadhach Ua Dubhthaigh, with the clergy and laity of Connacht; Tadhg Ua Briain, lord of Thomond; Tighearnan Ua Ruairc, lord of Breifne; and Murchadh, son of Gilla-na-naemh Ua Fearghail, lord of Muintir-Anghaile. The clergy of Connacht, with Muireadhach Ua Dubhthaigh, fasted at Rath-Brenainn, to get their guarantee, but it was not observed for them.

The issue was resolved, if not ended, when in 1144 "Ruaidhri Ua Conchobhair, son of Toirdhealbhach, was released from fetters by his father, at the intercession of the clergy."

== Surety violations ==
The following year, Muireadhach was involved in yet another national dispute when Toirdhealbhach kidnapped the king of Mide while under Ua Dubhtaigh's protection:

Murchadh Ua Maeleachlainn, King of Meath and its Fortuatha, was taken prisoner by Toirdhealbhach Ua Conchobhair, King of Connacht, while he was under the protection of the relics and guarantees of Ireland. These were they: the altar of Ciarán, with its relics; the shrine of Ciarán, called the Oreineach; the Matha-mor; the abbot and the prior, and two out of every order in the Church; Muireadhach Ua Dubhthaigh, the archbishop, the lord of Connacht; the successor of Patrick, and the Staff of Jesus; the successor of Feichin, and the bell of Feichin; and the Boban of Caeimhghin. All these were between Toirdhealbhach and Murchadh, that there should be no treachery, no guile, no defection of the one from the other, no blinding, no imprisoning, and no circumscribing of Murchadh's territory or land, until his crime should be evident to the sureties, and that they might proclaim him not entitled to protection; however, he was found guilty of no crime, though he was taken. He was set at liberty at the end of a month afterwards, through the interference of his sureties, and he was conveyed by his sureties into Munster; and the kingdom of Meath was given by Toirdhealbhach to his own son, Conchobhar. This capture was effected as follows: a hosting was made by Toirdhealbhach, as if to proceed into Munster; the Connachtmen, the Conmaicni, and the Ui-Briuin, collected to one place, and Ua Maeleachlainn was taken and conveyed to Dun-mor, together with the hostages of Meath in general; but not the smallest part of Meath was injured on this occasion.

Ua Dubhtaigh would also have attended the Peace Conference of Tir dha Ghlas in the same year "Toirdhealbhach Ua Conchobhair and Toirdhealbhach Ua Briain ... with the chiefs of Munster and Connacht, both laity and clergy; and they made forms of peace according to what the clergy ratified between them."

== Patron of the arts ==
Ua Dubhtaigh sponsored the creation of the Cross of Cong, which bears his name. He may also have been involved in the creation of the Corpus Missal, which dates from the early-to-mid 1130s.

== Later years ==
Ua Dubhtaigh is not mentioned in the annals subsequent to 1144. His death is recorded as occurring at Cong in 1150.

In 1168, "Flannagan Ua Dubhthaigh, bishop and chief doctor of the Irish in literature, history, and poetry, and in every kind of science known to man in his time, died in the bed of Muireadhach Ua Dubhthaigh, at Cunga."

A successor in the Archbishopric, Cadhla Ua Dubthaigh, was second Archbishop of Tuam and ambassador to Henry II (r. 1154–1189) in 1175. Muireadhach's precise relationship to Flannagan and Cadhla is uncertain.

Preceded by Domhnall Ua Dubhthaigh	Archbishop of Connacht; 1136–1150	Succeeded by Áed Ua hOissín
