= Dubhchobhlaigh Bean Ua hEaghra =

Dubhchobhlaigh Bean Ua hEaghra, a.k.a. Dubhchobhlaigh Ní Conchobair, Queen of Luighne Connacht, died 1131.

== Family background ==
Dubhchobhlaigh was one of the two recorded daughters of King Ruaidrí na Saide Buide of Connacht, who ruled the kingdom from 1087 till his mutilation and deposition in 1092. Her mother's name is uncertain, though Ruaidri had at least four wives.

Her brothers, half-brothers, and sister or half-sister were Niall (died 1093), Tadc (died 1097), Conchobar (died 1103), Domnall Ua Conchobair (died 1116), Tairrdelbach (1088–1156), and Mór Ua Conchobair (died after 1118), three of whom ruled as Kings of Connacht. Her youngest brother, Tairrdelbach, would become King of Ireland.

== Wife of Ua hEaghra ==
The identity of Dubhchobhlagh's husband is uncertain. The two most likely candidates are Taichleach Ua hEaghra, who was King of Luighne Connacht upon his death in 1095, and an unnamed An Ua hEaghra who was king at the time of his death in 1128. The latter's successor, Murchadh Ua hEaghra (murdered in 1134) can be eliminated as his wife was a niece of Dubhchobhlaigh by her brother, Tairrdelbach.

== Annalistic reference ==
The Annals of the Four Masters record her death sub anno 1131 - "Dubhchobhlaigh, daughter of Ruaidhri na Soighe Buidhe Ua Conchobhair, lady of Luighne, died." However, because of uncertainty over her husband's identity, and Gaelic Polygyny, her children are unknown (see Family tree, Eaghra Poprigh mac Saorghus).

== Family tree ==
   Ruaidrí na Saide Buide Ua Conchobair (died 1118)     
   |
   |___________________________________________________________________________________________________           
   |       |       |         |       |                                |                               |
   |       |       |         |       |                                |                               |
   Niall  Tadc  Conchobar  Domnall   Dubhchobhlaigh, d. 1131.   Tairrdelbach, 1088-1156.        Mór Ua Conchobair of Connacht, d. after 1118    
           |                 | 
   ________|                 |                        
   |       |               Domnall                  
 Cathal   Aed                |
   |                         |
   |                       Ruaidri,
 Domnall                   d. 1151.
 d. 1153.

== Others of the name ==
The forename Dubhchobhlaigh appears to have originated within the Ui Briuin. Dubhchobhlaigh's gr-gr-gr-gr grandaunt was Dub Chablaigh ingen Cathal (died 1009), while her aunt was Dubh Chablaigh ingen Áed (died 1088). Later bearers of the name included her niece, Dub Coblaigh Ní Conchobhair (died 1153), along with her kinswoman and nephew's wife, Dubhcobhlach Ní Maíl Ruanaid (died 1168).

== See also ==
- Dubhchobhlaigh
