= Dubhchobhlaigh =

Irish feminine given name

Dubhchobhlaigh, or Dubh Cobhlaigh, was a common Irish language feminine given name during the medieval period. It was first used by members of the royal dynasty of Connacht. Over twenty notable Gaelic women in Ireland between the 10th and 16th centuries had the name.

== People ==
- Dub Chablaigh ingen Cathal, Empress of the Irish, died 1009.
- Dubh Chablaigh ingen Áed, daughter of King Áed in Gai Bernaig, Queen of Munster, died 1088.
- Dubhchobhlaigh ingen Gillai Patraic, Queen of Osraighe, died 1095.
- Dub Coblaig Ní Briain, Princess of Thomond, died 1095
- Dubhchobhlaigh inghen Diarmada, Queen of Ireland, died 1097.
- Dubhchobhlaigh Bean Ua hEaghra, Queen of Luighne Connacht, died 1131.
- Dub Coblaigh Ní Conchobhair, Queen of Cenél Conaill, drowned 1153.
- Dubhcobhlach Ní Maíl Ruanaid, Queen of Connacht, died 1168.
- Dubcobhlaigh Ní Ruairc, Queen of Ireland, died 1181.
- Dubhcobhlaigh Níc Diarmata, died 1231.
- Dubhcobhlaigh Bean Uí Birn, died 1340/43.
- Dubhcoblaigh Ní Raighillaigh, died 1367.
- Dubhcoblaigh Ní Raghnaill, died 1378.
- Dubh Choblaigh Ní Diarmata, died 1381.
- Dubhcobhlaigh Ní Conchobair Failghe, died 1381.
- Dub Choblaigh Níc Uidhir, died 1444.
- Dubhcoblaigh Bean Mac Diarmada Rúaid, died 1532.

== See also ==
- List of Irish-language given names
