= Domnall Ua Ruairc =

Domnall Ua Ruairc (died 1102) was King of Connacht. Not much is known of King Domnall but it is stated that he defeated and slew in battle the previous king Tadg Mac Ruaidrí Ua Conchobair.

Preceded by Tadg mac Ruaidrí Ua Conchobair	Kings of Connacht; 1097–1102	Succeeded by Domnall Ua Conchobair
