= Domnall Ua Conchobair =

Domnall mac Ruaidrí Ua Conchobair (1102–1106) was King of Connacht.

Domnall was the second son of Ruaidrí na Saide Buide to assume the kingship. He deposed Domnall mac Tigernáin Ua Ruairc, been assisted by aid of Muirchertach Ua Briain, who was his father Ruaidrí's brother-in-law. Domnall was the last Ua Ruairc of Breifne to become king of Connacht.

Ua Briain, in 1106, had Domnall deposed by his younger brother, Toirdelbach Ua Conchobair, who was Muirchertach's nephew. Domnall's precise fate is unknown. Toirdelbach would in time go to great lengths to erase the descendants of his uncles and brothers from the genealogical record, leaving the succession open only to Ua Conchobair's descended from himself.

Preceded by Domnall Ua Ruairc	Kings of Connacht; 1102–1106	Succeeded by Toirdelbach Ua Conchobair
