= Treaty of Windsor (1175) =

Short-lived treaty signed during the time of the Norman invasion of Ireland

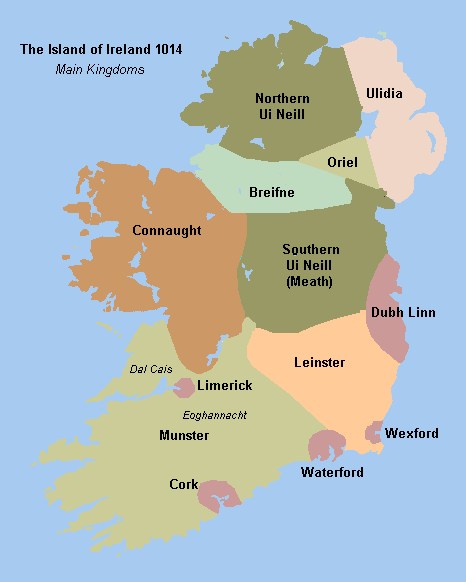
The main kingdoms in Gaelic Ireland.

The Treaty of Windsor (1175) was a territorial agreement made during the time of the Anglo-Norman invasion of Ireland. It was signed in Windsor, Berkshire by King Henry II of England and the Ard Rí or High King of Ireland, Ruaidrí Ua Conchobair (Rory O'Connor).

== Treaty ==
Overall, the agreement left O'Connor with a kingdom consisting of Ireland outside the provincial kingdom of Leinster (as it was then), Dublin and a territory from Waterford Dungarvan, as long as he paid tribute to Henry II, and owed fealty to him. All of Ireland was also subject to the new religious provisions of the papal bull Laudabiliter and the Synod of Cashel (1172).

O'Connor was obliged to pay one treated cow hide for every ten cattle. The other "kings and people" of Ireland were to enjoy their lands and liberties so long as they remained faithful to the kings of England, and were obliged to pay their tribute in hides through O'Connor.

The witnesses were Richard of Ilchester, Bishop of Winchester; Geoffrey, Bishop of Ely; Laurence O'Toole, Archbishop of Dublin; William, Earl of Essex; Justiciar Richard de Luci; Geoffrey de Purtico, Reginald de Courtenea (Courtenay) and three of Henry's court chaplains.

The Annals of Tigernach recorded that: "Cadla Ua Dubthaig came from England from the Son of the Empress, having with him the peace of Ireland, and the kingship thereof, both Foreigner and Gael, to Ruaidhrí Ó Conchobhair, and to every provincial king his province from the king of Ireland, and their tributes to Ruaidhrí." The Annals also listed the ongoing violence in Ireland at the time. The text reveals a misunderstanding of the scope of the treaty and the matters agreed by the two kings that soon proved fatal to the peace of Ireland. Henry saw O'Connor as his subordinate within the feudal system, paying him an annual rent on behalf of all his sub-kings; O'Connor saw himself as the restored High King of Ireland, subject only to a very affordable annual tribute to Henry.

=== Treaty Text ===
"This is the agreement which was made at Windsor in the octaves of Michaelmas [October 6] in the year of Our Lord 1175, between Henry, king of England, and Roderic [Rory], king of Connaught, by Catholicus, archbishop of Tuam, Cantordis, abbot of Clonfert, and Master Laurence, chancellor of the king of Connaught, namely: The king of England has granted to Roderic [Rory], his liegeman, king of Connacht, as long as he shall faithfully serve him, that he shall be king under him, ready to his service, as his man. And he shall hold his land as fully and as peacefully as he held it before the lord king entered Ireland, rendering him tribute. And that he shall have all the rest of the land and its inhabitants under him and shall bring them to account [justiciet eos], so that they shall pay their full tribute to the king of England through him, and so that they shall maintain their rights. And those who are now in possession of their lands and rights shall hold them in peace as long as they remain in the fealty of the king of England, and continue to pay him faithfully and fully his tribute and the other rights which they owe to him, by the hand of the king of Connaught, saving in all things the right and honour of the king of England and of Roderic. And if any of them shall be rebels to the king of England and to Roderic and shall refuse to pay the tribute and other rights of the king of England by his hand, and shall withdraw from the fealty of the king of England, he, Roderic, shall judge them and remove them. And if he cannot answer for them by himself, the constable of the king of England in that land [Ireland] shall, when called upon by him, aid him to do what is necessary. And for this agreement the said king of Connaught shall render to the king of England tribute every year, namely, out of every ten animals slaughtered, one hide, acceptable to the merchants both in his land as in the rest; save that he shall not meddle with those lands which the lord king has retained in his lordship and in the lordship of his bat:ons; that is to say, Dublin with all its appurtenances; Meath with all its appurtenances, even as Murchat Ua Mailethlachlin [Murchadh 0' Melaghlin] held it fully and freely [melius et plenius] or as others held it of him; Wexford with all its appurtenances, that is to say, the whole of Leinster; and Waterford with its whole territory from Waterford to Dungarvan, including Dungarvan with all its appurtenances. And if the Irish who have fled wish to return to the land of the barons of the king of England they may do so in peace, paying the said tribute as others pay it, or doing to the English the services which they were wont to do for their lands, which shall be decided by the judgment and will of their lords. And if any of them are unwilling to return and their lords have called upon the king of Connaught, he shall compel them to return to their land, so that they shall dwell there in peace. And the king of Connaught shall accept hostages from all whom the lord king of England has committed to him, and he shall himself give hostages at the will of the king. The witnesses are Robert, bishop of Winchester; Geoffrey, bishop of Ely; Laurence, archbishop of Dublin; Geoffrey Nicholas and Roger, the king's chaplains; William, Earl of Essex; Richard de Luci; Geoffrey de Portico, and Reginald de Courteney."

== Outcomes ==
However the Treaty was soon broken. The land-hungry Anglo-Norman lords rapidly began expanding. Henry II himself repudiated the Treaty in 1177 and named his son John as Lord of Ireland. However, John never assumed the position of King of Ireland simply because Henry died suddenly in 1189 and John, being the heir apparent to the English throne became King of England, and as the kingship of England at this time carried with it the ancillary title of ‘Lord of Ireland', and as the Treaty of Windsor had been repudiated by his father, John assumed the titles 'King of England' as well as 'Lord of Ireland', which had the further de facto effect of denying any claim he had on the Irish kingship. Meaning subsequent claims by the English monarchy to the kingship of Ireland, such as Henry VIII and later kings claimed, were in the opinion of some, rendered illegitimate.

== See also ==
- List of treaties
