= Ruaidrí na Saide Buide Ua Conchobair =

Ruaidrí na Saide Buide
- King of Connacht
- Reign: 1087–1092
- Predecessor: Áed Ua Ruairc
- Successor: Flaithbertaigh Ua Flaithbertaigh
- Spouse: several, including Mór Ní Briain
- Issue: Niall mac Ruaidrí Ua Conchobair; Tadc; Conchobar mac Ruaidrí Ua Conchobair; Domnall; Toirdelbach; Dubhchobhlaigh Bean Ua hEaghra; Mór Ua Conchobair of Connacht
- Dynasty: O'Conor
- Father: Áed in Gai Bernaig

Ruaidrí Ua Conchobair (died 1118) (anglicised Roderic O'Connor), called Ruaidrí na Saide Buide (Ruaidrí of the Yellow Birch) was King of Connacht, perhaps twice.

== Background ==
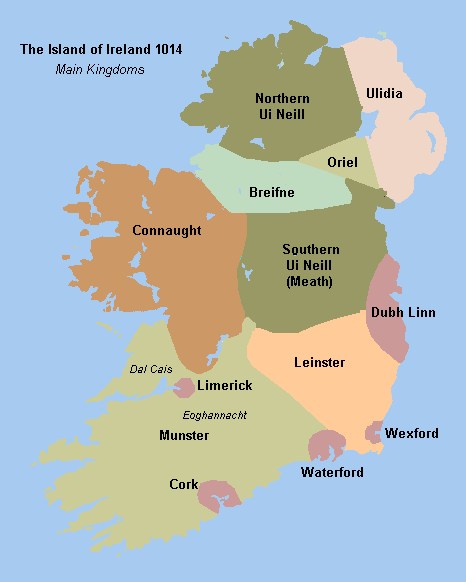
Ireland in the 11th century

Connacht in the 11th century was a region that resembled the modern Irish province. The main difference was that the Kingdom of Breifne, whose rulers sometimes also ruled over Connacht, extended into parts of southern Ulster. The kings of Connacht had, for several hundred years, belong to the Uí Briúin kindred, who traced their descent from a half-brother, Brion, of Niall of the Nine Hostages. Connacht and its kings had been associated with the Uí Néill High Kings of Ireland, descendants of Niall of the Nine Hostages, but as allies rather than as subjects. With the ending of the era of Uí Néill High Kingship at the death of Máel Sechnaill mac Domnaill in 1022, a new era began, one in which the various provincial kings in Ireland attempted to impose themselves as kings of Ireland, emulating Brian Bóruma. In the 1070s, Brian Bóruma's grandson Toirdelbach Ua Briain was the leading king in Ireland, and if he was less powerful than his propagandists then and later would claim, he exercised a significant influence over Connacht.

The Uí Briúin were divided into three major groups by the 11th century. First, the Uí Briúin Aí, led by the descendants of Conchobar mac Taidg Mór, the family of Ua Conchobair (modern O'Connor), whose power-base lay in central Connacht, originally centred on the important royal site of Cruachan. The second group were the family of Ua Ruairc (modern O'Rourke), the kings of Breifne, who first provided a king of Connacht in the 10th century, Fergal Ua Ruairc. The third group were the Uí Briúin Seóla, whose leading family was the Ua Flaithbertaig (modern O'Flaherty), who dominated Iarchonnacht.

== Family ==
Ruaidrí belonged to the Ua Conchobair family. His father, Áed in Gai Bernaig was a descendant in the 8th generation of Conchobar mac Taidg Mór. Although sons rarely directly followed their fathers as provincial kings, each of Ruaidrí's paternal ancestors as far back as Conchobar (died 882) had been reckoned a king of Connacht. His mother was Caillech Cáemgein. She may have belonged to the Clann Uatach of modern County Roscommon.

   Tadg in Eich Gil, died 1030.
   |
   | _______________________________________
   |                                      |
   |                                      |
   Áed in Gai Bernaig, fl. 1046–67.       Tadg Dubhsúileach, d. 1009.
   |
   |____________________________________________________________________________________________________________
   |                             |             |               |                            |                 |
   |                             |             |               |                            |                 |
   Ruaidrí na Saide Buide  Cú Chonnacht Tadg, d. 1062.  Murchad Liathnach, d. 1069.  Cathal, d. 1082.  Niall Odar
   |                                                                                                          d.1105.
   |___________________________________________________________________________________________________________
   |                |               |                   |                  |                  |               |
   |                |               |                   |                  |                  |               |
   Niall, d. 1093.  Tadc, d. 1097.  Conchobar, d.1103.  Domnall,    Mór Ua Conchobair,   Dubhchobhlaigh,      Tairrdelbach,     
                                                        d.1118.     d. after 1118.       died 1131.           1088–1156.

== Early career ==
Áed in Gai Bernaig was killed in battle in 1067, fighting against Áed Ua Ruairc of Breifne. The Annals of Ulster call him "overlord of the province of Connacht, valiant steersman of Leth Cuinn" in the report of his death. Ua Ruairc became king of Connacht following this victory.

== Ridamna Connachta ==
By 1076, when he is first mentioned by the Irish annals, Ruaidrí appears to have replaced Ua Ruairc as provincial overking. The Annals of Innisfallen record that he was captured by Toirdelbach Ua Briain, King of Munster, and released for tribute. He appears to have been deposed by Toirdelbach, and Áed Ua Ruairc restored as king of Connacht, in 1079. In that year Ruaidrí disposed of a rival, Áed Ua Flaithbertaig of Iarconnacht being killed.

== King of Connachta ==
In 1087, with Toirdelbach Ua Briain now dead, Ruaidrí, with the aid of the church of Clonmacnoise, defeated Ua Ruairc in battle and again seized the kingship of Connacht. Toirdelbach's son Muirchertach Ua Briain appears to have been as hostile to Ruaidrí as his father had been. In 1088 Ruaidrí recognised Muirchertach's rival Domnall Ua Lochlainn as king of Ireland and the two invaded Munster, burning Muirchertach's town of Limerick and destroying some part of the Ua Briain's inaugural site at Kincora. The Chronicon Scotorum says that in parts of Munster "they hardly left a cow or man undestroyed". Muirchertach retaliated in 1089, and his men succeeded in inflicting insult by felling a sacred tree in County Galway, but the raid was largely unsuccessful and Ruaidrí retaliated by raiding Munster.

== Usurped ==
Ruaidrí again submitted to Ua Lochlainn in 1090, as did the king of Mide and Ua Briain. In 1092 he was blinded by his own foster-son, Flaithbertaigh Ua Flaithbertaigh, who seized the kingship of Connacht. Ua Flaitbertaig was killed in 1098 by Ruaidrí's kin and may have been deposed as king before his death. Ruaidrí may have retired to the monastery at Clonmacnoise. He died there in 1118.

== Family ==
Ruaidrí was married to four or more women, including Toirdelbach Ua Briain's daughter Mór, who died in 1088. His sons included Niall, killed in 1093, Tadc, killed in 1097, perhaps king of Connacht, Conchobar, murdered in 1103, Domnall, installed as king of Connacht with Muirchertach Ua Briain's aid and then deposed by him in 1106, and lastly Toirdelbach, who was Mór's son, who would be one of the greatest kings in 12th century Ireland. He also had at least two daughters: Mór Ua Conchobair of Connacht. and 1131. Dubhchobhlaigh, daughter of Ruaidhri na Soighe Buidhe Ua Conchobhair, lady of Luighne, died.

Preceded by Áed Ua Ruairc	Kings of Connacht; 1087–1092	Succeeded by Flaithbertaigh Ua Flaithbertaigh
