= Áed Ua Ruairc =

Irish provincial king, 11th century

Áed Ua Ruairc, also known as Áed mac Art Uallach Ua Ruairc, was the King of Connacht from 1067 to 1087. He became king after killing the previous King of Connacht, Áed in Gai Bernaig, in battle in 1067.

Preceded by Áed in Gai Bernaig	Kings of Connacht; 1067–1087	Succeeded by Ruaidrí na Saide Buide
