= Tadg mac Ruaidrí Ua Conchobair =

Tadg mac Ruaidrí Ua Conchobair (died 1097) was King of Connacht.

Tadg was a senior son of Ruaidrí na Saide Buide, who was deposed in 1092 by Flaithbertaigh Ua Flaithbertaigh. The succession became confused, with O'Hynes of Aidhne been made king by Ua Flaithbertaigh. However, by 1097, Tadg had ascended to the kingship only to be killed by Domnall mac Tigernáin Ua Ruairc.

Preceded by Flaithbertaigh Ua Flaithbertaigh	Kings of Connacht; 1095–1097	Succeeded by Domnall Ua Ruairc
