= Laudabiliter =

12th-century papal bull

Laudabiliter was a bull issued in 1155 by Pope Adrian IV, the only Englishman to have served in that office. Existence of the bull has been disputed by scholars over the centuries; no copy is extant but scholars cite the many references to it as early as the 13th century to support the validity of its existence. The bull grants the right to the Angevin King Henry II of England to invade and govern Ireland and to enforce the Gregorian Reforms on the semi-autonomous Christian Church in Ireland. Richard de Clare ("Strongbow") and the other leaders of the Anglo-Norman invasion of Ireland (1169–1171) claimed that Laudabiliter authorised the invasion. These Cambro-Norman knights were retained by Diarmait Mac Murchada, the deposed King of Leinster, as an ally in his fight with the High King of Ireland, Ruaidrí Ua Conchobair.

Successive kings of England, from Henry II (1171) until Henry VIII (1542), used the title Lord of Ireland and claimed that it had been conferred by Adrian's successor, Pope Alexander III (c. 1100/1105 – 1181).

After almost four centuries of the Lordship, the declaration of the independence of the Church of England from papal supremacy and the rejection of the authority of the Holy See required the creation of a new basis to legitimise the continued rule of the English monarch in Ireland. In 1542, the Crown of Ireland Act was passed by both the English and Irish parliaments. The Act established a sovereign Kingdom of Ireland with Henry as King of Ireland. English rule of Ireland was effectively reaffirmed by the Catholic Church in 1555, through Pope Paul IV's bull Ilius, per quem Reges regnant, which bestowed the crown of the kingdom on Philip II of Spain and Mary I of England.

== Text ==
Latin text

Adrianus episcopus servus
servorum Dei carissimo in Christo
filio illustri Anglorum regi salutem et
apostolicam benedictionem.
Laudabiliter et satis fructose de
glorioso nomine propagando in terris
et eterne felicitatis premio cumulando
in celis tua magnificentia cogitat, dum
ad dilatandos ecclesie terminos, ad
declarandam indoctis et rudibus
populis Christiane fidei veritatem et
vitiorum plantaria de agro dominico
exstirpanda, sicut catholicus princeps
intendis, et ad id convenientius
exequendum consilium apostolice
sedis exigis et favorem. In quo facto
quanto altiori consilio et maiori
discretione procedis tanto in eo
feliciorem progressum te, prestante
Domino, confidimus habiturum, eo
quod ad bonum exitum semper et
finem soleant attingere que de ardore
fidei et religionis amore principium
acceperunt. Sane Hiberniam et omnes
insulas quibus sol iustitie Christus
illuxit et que documenta fidei
Christiane ceperunt ad ius beati Petri
et sacrosancte Romane ecclesie quod
tua etiam nobilitas recognoscit non est
dubium pertinere. Unde tanto in eis
libentius plantationem fidelem et
germen gratum Deo inserimus quanto
id a nobis interno examine districtius
prospicimus exigendum. Significasti
siquidem nobis, fili in Christo
carissime, te Hibernie insulam ad
subdendum illum populum legibus et
vitiorum plantaria inde extirpanda
velle intrare et de singulis domibus
annuam unius denarii beato Petro
velle solvere pensionem et iura
ecclesiarum illius terre illibata et
integra conservare. Nos itaque pium
et laudabile desiderium tuum cum
favore congruo prosequentes et
petitioni tue benignum impendentes
assensum gratum et acceptum
habemus ut pro dilatandis ecclesie
terminis, pro vitiorum restringendo
decursu, pro corrigendis moribus et
virtutibus inserendis, pro Christiane
religionis augmento, insulam illam
ingrediaris et que ad honorem Dei et
salutem illius terre spectaverint
exequaris, et illius terre populus
honorifice te recipiat et sicut dominum
veneretur, iure nimirum ecclesiarum
illibato et integro permanente et salva
beato Petro et sacrosancte Romane
ecclesie de singulis domibus annua
unius denarii pensione. Si ergo quod
concepisti animo effectu duxeris
prosequente complendum, stude
gentem illam bonis moribus informare
et agas tam per te quam per illos quos
ad hoc fide, verbo et vita idoneos esse
prospexeris ut decoretur ibi ecclesia,
plantetur et crescat fidei Christiane
religio et que ad honorem Dei et
salutem pertinent animarum per te
taliter ordinentur ut a Deo sempiterne
mercedis cumulum conseque merearis
et in terris gloriosum nomen valeas in
seculis obtinere.

Translation:
English translation by Sebastian Lidbetter, 2019

Adrian the bishop, the servant of the
servants of God, to his dearest son in Christ, the
illustrious king of the English, greeting and
apostolic blessing.
In right praiseworthy fashion, and to
good purpose, your magnificence is
considering how to spread abroad the glorious
name of Christ on earth, and thus store up for
yourself in heaven the reward for eternal bliss,
while striving as a true Catholic prince should,
to enlarge the boundaries of the Church, to
reveal the truth of the Christian faith to peoples
still untaught and barbarous, and to root out the
weeds of vice from the Lord's field; and the
more expeditiously to achieve this end, you
seek the counsel and favour of the Apostolic
See. We are confident that in this matter, with
God's help, you will attain that degree of
success which is in proportion to the loftiness
of your aims and the amount of discretion you
display as you proceed with them. For
enterprises which have their starting point in
burning faith and love of religion are always
ultimately successful in achieving their goal.
That Ireland, and indeed all islands on which
Christ, the sun of justice, has shed His rays, and
which have received the teaching of the
Christian faith, belong to the jurisdiction of
blessed St. Peter and the holy Roman church is
a fact beyond doubt, and one which your
nobility recognises. So we are all the more
eager to implant in those islands the offshoot of
faith, an offshoot pleasing to God, as we realise
that an examination of our own heart sternly
requires of us that we should take this action.
You have indeed indicated to us, dearly beloved
son in Christ, that you wish to enter this island
of Ireland, to make that people obedient to the
laws, and to root out from there the weeds of
vices, that you are willing to pay St. Peter the
annual tax of one penny from each
household, and to preserve the rights of the
churches of that land intact and unimpaired.
We therefore support your pious and
praiseworthy intention with favour which it
deserves and, granting our benevolent consent,
we consider it pleasing and acceptable that you
should enter that island for the purpose of
enlarging the boundaries of the church,
checking the descent of wickedness, correcting
morals and implanting virtues, and encouraging
the growth of the faith in Christ; that you
pursue policies directed towards the honour of
God and the well-being of that land, and that
the people of that land receive you honourably
and respect you as their lord, all this being on
condition that the rights of the church remain
intact and unimpaired, and without prejudice to
the payment to St. Peter and the holy Roman
church of an annual tax of one penny from
every household. Therefore, if you wish to bring
to a successful conclusion the design which you
have thus conceived, take particular care to
instruct that people in right behaviour and, both
in person, and acting through those whom you
consider well-suited for this purpose by reason
of their strong faith, eloquence and Christian
religion may be planted and grow, and that
everything pertaining to the honour of God and
the salvation of men's souls may be so ordered
that you may be deemed worthy to win from
God that crowning reward of everlasting life,
and may obtain on earth glorious name for all
ages.

== Papal bull ==
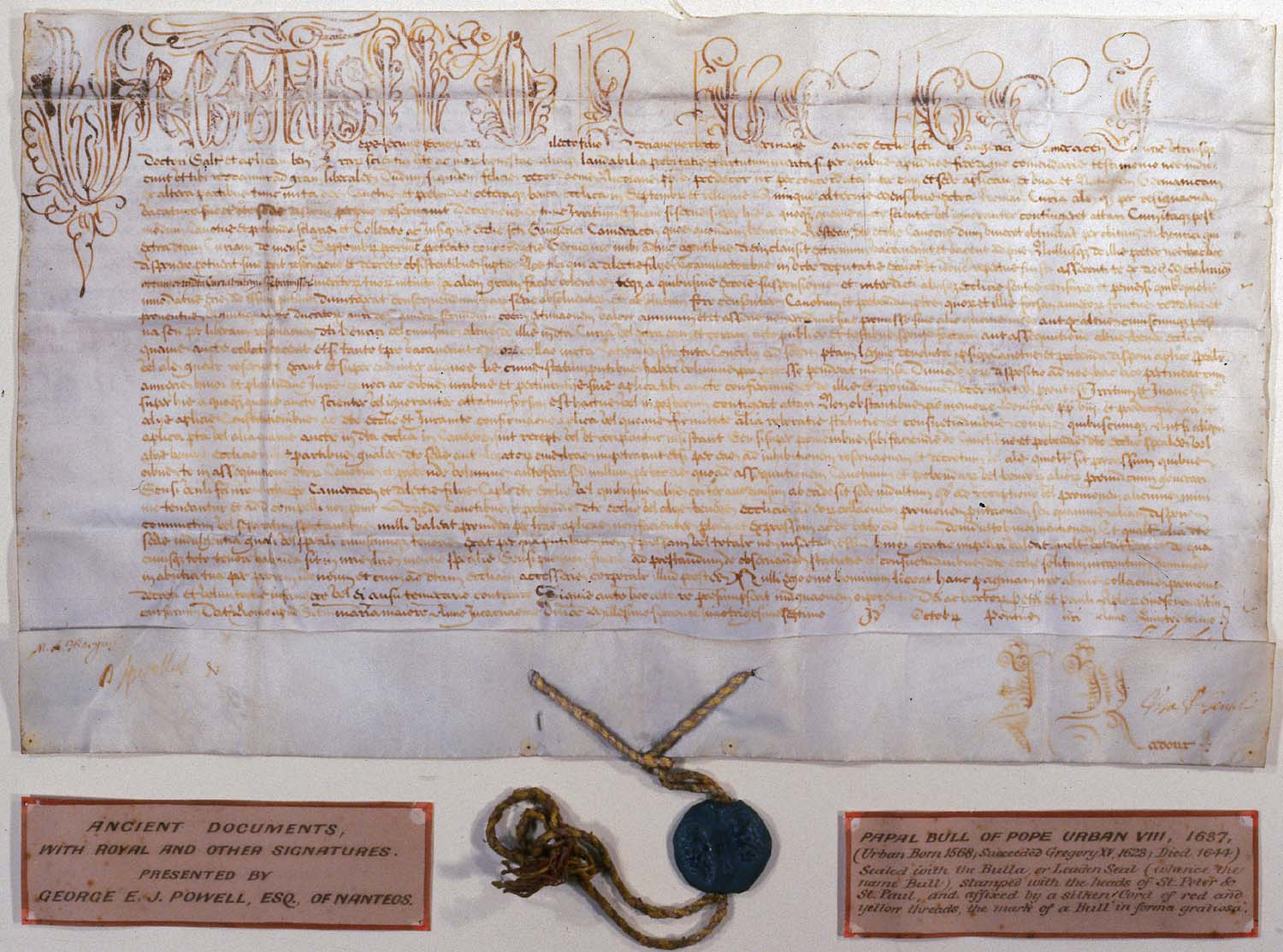
A Papal bull of Pope Urban VIII, 1637, sealed with a leaden bulla.

A bull is a papal letter that takes its name from the leaden seal attached to it. The original bulla was a lump of clay moulded around a cord and stamped with a seal. When dry, the container could not be violated without visible damage to the bulla, thereby ensuring the contents remain tamper-proof until they reach their destination.

Stephen J. McCormick, in his preface to The Pope and Ireland, notes that it was well known that the forgery of both papal and other documents was fairly common in the 12th century. Citing Professor Jungmann, who in the appendix to his Dissertationes Historiœ Ecclesiasticœ, in the fifth volume says, "it is well known from history that everywhere towards the close of the 12th century there were forged or corrupted Papal Letters or Diplomas. That such was the case frequently in England is inferred from the Letters of John Sarisbiensis and of others."

Currently, any attempt at sourcing the original document is impossible as the Vatican says the original Laudabiliter is no longer in existence.

== Background ==
In 1148, Malachy of Armagh died at Clairvaux while on his way to Rome. Shortly thereafter Bernard wrote the Life of Malachy. As an exercise in hagiography rather than history, Bernard presented his friend as a reforming Archbishop, and exaggerated the obstacles Malachy had to overcome: "Never before had he known the like, in whatever depth of barbarism; never had he found men so shameless in regard of morals, so dead in regard of rites, so stubborn in regard of discipline, so unclean in regard of life. They were Christians in name, in fact pagans." Bernard's characterization did much to form the general view of European clerics towards the Irish.

The 21-year-old Henry FitzEmpress came to the throne of England on 19 December 1154, after almost twenty years of civil war between his mother, the Empress Matilda and her cousin, Stephen of Blois. Less than three weeks earlier, an Englishman, Nicholas Breakspear had become Pope taking the name Adrian.

The following September the royal council met at Winchester and discussed invading Ireland and giving it to Henry's youngest brother William. Theobald of Bec was Archbishop of Canterbury. In 1148, he secured from Pope Eugene III, Canterbury's jurisdiction over the bishops of Wales. Theobald exercised a theoretical claim to jurisdiction over Irish sees in consecrating the Bishop of Limerick in 1140. But in 1152, in conjunction with the Synod of Kells, the papal legate appointed the Archbishop of Armagh primate of Ireland. With his metropolitan aspirations frustrated, Theobald was likely one of Henry's advisors who urged the conquest of Ireland.

However, the plans were put aside for the time being when Henry's mother, the Empress Matilda, spoke against it. Henry, had his hands full of domestic troubles with the refractory barons in England, with the Welsh, and with the discordant elements in his French dominions, and could not undertake a military operation like the invasion of Ireland.

In May 1169, Cambro-Norman mercenaries landed in Ireland at the request of Dermot MacMurragh, the ousted king of Leinster, who had sought help in regaining his kingdom. Henry authorised Diarmait to seek help from the soldiers and mercenaries in his kingdom in exchange for an oath of allegiance. In October 1171, Henry landed a large army in Ireland to establish control over both the Cambro-Normans and the Irish.

== Bull Laudabiliter ==
Historians such as Laurence Ginnell, believe the letters written in the 12th century relating to Ireland were never sealed with any seal and are not correctly called bulls but rather privilegia or privileges. J. H. Round says that the grant of Ireland by Adrian is erroneously styled "the Bull Laudabiliter". It has been so long spoken of as a bull, he says, that one hardly knows how to describe it. He suggests that as long as it is realised that it was only a commendatory letter no mistake can arise.

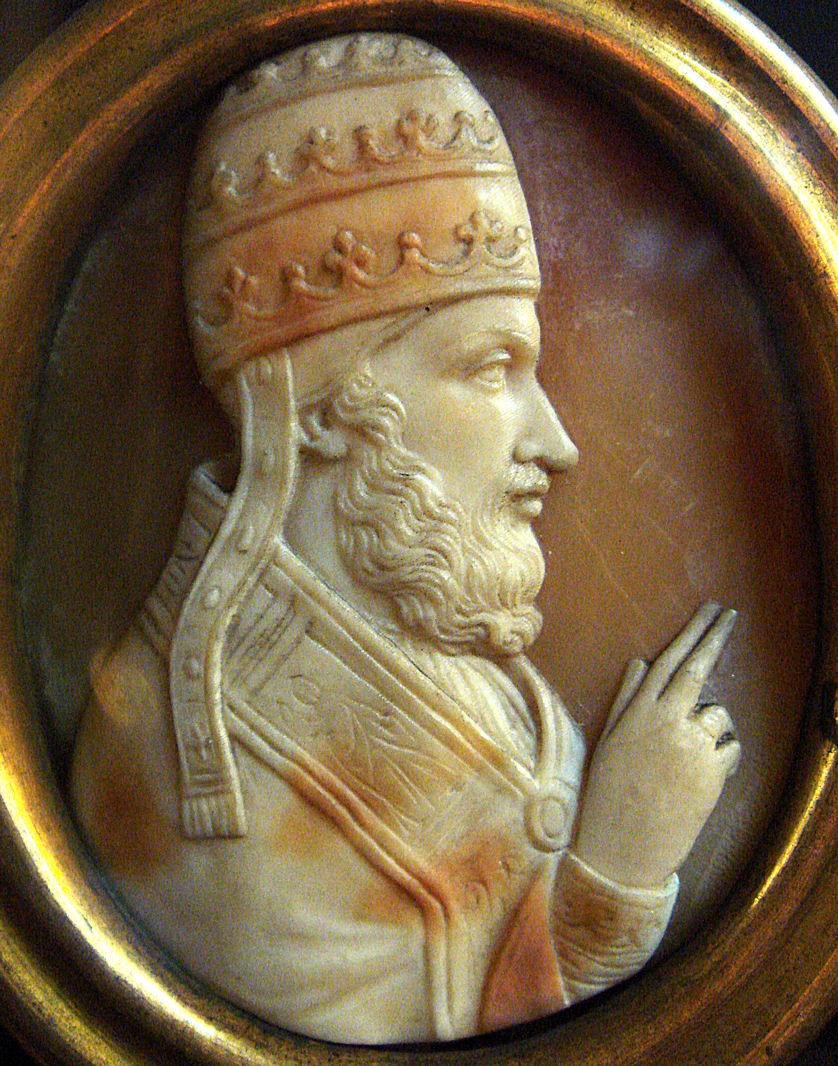
Cameo of Pope Adrian IV

In 1155, Pope Adrian IV issued Laudabiliter. The document supposedly commissioned the King Henry II to intervene in Ireland to assist in the reform of the governance of the Irish Church and the Irish system of governance according to the Latin Church ecclesiastical system. This followed the structural reform of the Church in Ireland as defined shortly before at the 1152 Synod of Kells. The bull derives its title from the Latin word laudabiliter (meaning laudably or in a praiseworthy manner), which is the opening word in the bull, the usual manner in which bulls are named.

John of Salisbury writes, "I recollect a journey I once made into Apulia for the purpose of visiting his Holiness, Pope Adrian IV. I stayed with him at Beneventum for nearly three months". In English Misrule in Ireland: A Course of Lectures in Reply to J. A. Froude, Burke states that Pope Adrian was elected on 3 December 1154 and suggests that it must have taken at least a month in those days before news of the election would have arrived in England, and at least another before John of Salisbury arrived in Rome making his arrival there around March 1155.

In his 1159 Metalogicon, John of Salisbury states that on the occasion of his visit to Adrian IV at Benevento between November 1155 and July 1156, the latter, at his request, granted to Henry II of England the "hereditary possession" of Ireland; he mentioned documentation as well as a ring of investiture, preserved in the public treasury, which he, John, had conveyed from the pope to the king. Alfread H. Tarleton in Nicholas Breakspear (Adrian IV.) Englishman and Pope, suggests that the letter and the ring were deposited at Winchester.

Giraldus Cambrensis incorporated what was purported to be a copy of Laudabiliter in his 1189 Expugnatio Hibernica ("Conquest of Ireland").

== Authenticity debate ==
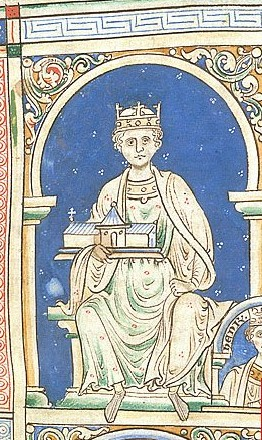
Henry II of England

According to Edmund Curtis, for the text of the Laudabiliter we only have Giraldus Cambrensis' Conquest of Ireland written around 1188, though in it his dating is not accurate, he says he must have had some such "genuine document before him". He suggests that better evidence for the grant of Ireland can be found in John of Salisbury's Metalogicus, written about 1159.

=== John of Salisbury ===
At the beginning of his reign, Henry II sent Rotrodus, Bishop of Evreux, Arnold, Bishop of Lisieux, the Bishop of Le Mans and Robert of Gorham, Abbot of St. Albans as ambassadors to Adrian IV. The date of this mission is the same as that claimed by Salisbury for his visit, 1155. Alfread H. Tarleton gives the date of 9 October, St. Dionysius's day, when the ambassadors set out. L. F. Rushbrook Williams also gives 9 October 1155. While both mention Robert of Gorham assisting in some royal business and being a part of deputation including three bishops selected by Henry neither mention John of Salisbury. However, John D. Hosler thinks "It is clear that John of Salibury did indeed travel to Rome as part of Henry's first embassy to Pope Adrian.

According to L. F. Rushbrook Williams, Abbot Robert of Gorham evidently saw with the elevation of Adrian IV an opportunity of acquiring privileges for St. Albans with the ostensible object of assisting in the settlement of some royal business which was in progress at the curia. Alfread H Tarleton suggests that some historians have stated that John of Salisbury accompanied this mission but this is a mistake, based on a confusion of the fact that John had many interviews with the Pope at Beneventum. The mistake may be due to the fact that the King, hearing John intended to visit the Pope, sent messages and letters through him in addition to employing a regular messenger, in the person of Robert the Abbot.

Gasquet suggests that there is almost conclusively evidence, that while a request of the nature described by Salisbury was made about this time to the Pope, Salisbury was not the envoy sent to make it. John of Salisbury, he notes, claims in Metalogicus to have been the ambassador for Henry II and obtained Laudabiliter for him and gives the year 1155 as the date when it was granted. With Bernard of Clairvaux's Life of Malachy and its description of the Irish as little more than savages, John of Salisbury found a ready audience in Rome when he spoke about the barbaric and impious people of Ireland.

Salisbury finished his work called Polycraticus, written before Metalogicus he dedicated it to Thomas Becket, then Chancellor of England and later a saint, who at this time was with Henry at the siege of Toulouse. This was in 1159; and in that year, Salisbury was presented to Henry apparently for the first time, by Thomas.

==== Metalogicus and Polycraticus ====
According to Stephen J. McCormick, the date that Metalogicus was written is fixed according to the author himself, pointing to the fact that John of Salisbury immediately before he tells us that the news of Pope Adrian's death had reached him his own patron, Theobald of Bec, Archbishop of Canterbury, though still living, was "weighed down by many infirmities." Pope Adrian died in 1159 he says and the death of Archbishop, Theobald of Bec occurred in 1161. Gile and other editors of John of Salisbury's works, without a dissent, refer the Metalogicus to the year 1159, a view shared by Curtis.

John of Salisbury, in his Metalogicus (lib. iv., cap. 42) writes, that while he was in an official capacity at the Papal Court, in 1155, Pope Adrian IV, granted the investiture of Ireland Henry II of England. However, John of Salisbury also kept a diary, later published, entitled Polycraticus and had a detailed account of the various incidents of his embassy to Pope Adrian, yet in it he makes no mention of the Bull, or of the gold ring and its fine emerald, mentioned in Metalogicus or of the grant of Ireland, all of which would have been so important for his narrative in Metalogicus. If Adrian granted this Bull to Henry at the solicitation of John of Salisbury in 1155 there is but one explanation for the silence in Polycraticus, according to McCormick and that this secrecy was required by the English monarch.

J. Duncan Mackie writes that those who desire to do away altogether with Laudabiliter, find in the last chapter of the sixth book of the Metalogicus, an account of the transaction between John and Pope Adrian and in this passage is an almost insurmountable difficulty. It become necessary he says to assume that it is an interpolation, and this can only be done "in the face of all probability."

=== Giraldus Cambrensis ===
John of Salisbury, speaking of the existence of Laudabiliter in the last chapter of the Metalogicus does not give its text and it was at least thirty years after Adrian's death that the Laudabiliter itself first appeared in the Expugnatio Hibernica of Giraldus Cambrensis.

Oliver Joseph Thatcher suggests that the trustworthiness of Giraldus, to whom he says we owe Laudabiliter preservation, has nothing to do with the question of its genuineness, and should be left out of the discussion. However, Thomas Moore says the character of the man himself ought to be taken into account, and Michael Richter says that as no copy of the text survives, the issue becomes the credibility of those authors who recorded it on their works.

According to Thatcher, Giraldus Cambrensis apparently drew a false inference from John of Salisbury's works by saying that John went as the king's ambassador to the pope. Thatcher notes that other historians have since then unthinkingly copied this statement.

Giraldus first published the Expugnatio Hibernica around the year 1188. According to Gasquet every subsequent English chronicler who mentions Laudabiliter has simply accepted it on Giraldus's authority. James F. Dimock notes that some late Irish writers seemed to him to put more faith in Giraldus's history than it really deserves. Dimock, who edited Giraldi Cambrensis Opera, says that the Expugnatione Hiberniae is, in great measure, rather "a poetical fiction than a prosaic truthful history."

=== Date the bull was produced ===
On the question of the date when Laudabiliter was first publicized, most of those who deny its authenticity believe that it was first made known about 1180 according to Ginnell. Ua Clerigh believes Laudabiliter was probably prepared in 1156, but not forwarded at that time because the offer of Adrian was not then acted on, though the investiture was accepted.

According to Burke, in the year 1174 King Henry II produced Laudabiliter which he said he got from Pope Adrian IV, permitting him to go to Ireland. For twenty years, according to McCormick, that is from 1155 to 1175, there was no mention of the gift of Adrian. Henry did not refer to it when authorising his vassals to join Dermot MacMurrough in 1167, or when he himself set out for Ireland to receive the homage of the Irish princes and not even after he assumed his new title and accomplished the purpose of his expedition.

Curtis, however, while accepting that it is true that the Laudabiliter was not published by Henry when in Ireland, that can be explained by his being alienated from Rome over the murder of Thomas Becket, in addition to the Empress Matilda's having protested against this invasion of Ireland. The date, Burke writes, that was on Laudabiliter was 1154, therefore it was consequently twenty years old. During this twenty-year period nobody ever heard of this Laudabiliter except Henry, and it was said that Henry kept this a secret, because his mother, the Empress Matilda, did not want Henry to act on it.

The Synod of Cashel in 1172, McCormick notes was the first Episcopal assembly after Henry's arrival in Ireland. The Papal Legate was present and had Adrian's Bull existed it should necessarily have engaged the attention of the assembled Fathers. However, "not a whisper" as to Adrian's grant he says was to be heard at that Council. Even the learned editor of Cambrensis Eversus Dr. Kelly, while asserting the genuineness of Adrian's Bull, admits "there is not any, even the slightest authority, for asserting that its existence was known in Ireland before the year 1172, or for three years later".

McCormick says that it is extremely difficult, in any hypothesis, to explain in a satisfactory way this silence, nor is it easy to understand how a fact so important to the interests of Ireland could remain so many years concealed, including from those in the Irish Church. Throughout this period he says, Ireland numbered among its Bishops one who held the important office of Legate of the Holy See, and that the Church had had constant intercourse with England and the continent through St Laurence O'Toole and a hundred other distinguished Prelates, who enjoyed in the fullest manner the confidence of Rome.

== Evidence for the bull ==
That an actual bull was sent is not doubted by many and its authenticity has been questioned without success according to P. S. O'Hegarty who suggests that the question now is purely an academic one.

- Radulfus de Diceto, Dean of London, and those of Roger de Wendover and Matthew Paris in which Laudabiliter is cited as a Bull.

In 1331 the Justiciar and Council of Ireland wrote to Pope John XXII asking him to proclaim a crusade against some Irish clans, basing their request on their understanding that "the holy apostolic see in the time of Pope Adrian of blessed memory conceded the land to the illustrious king of the English". The request was refused.

=== Four letters of Pope Alexander III ===
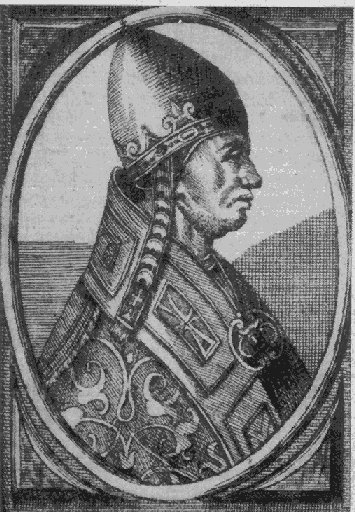
Pope Alexander III

On the conclusion of the Synod of Cashel according to Edmund Curtis, Henry sent envoys to Pope Alexander III asking for a papal privilege for Ireland. Alexander from Tusculum then published three letters on the Irish question. The three letters, according to Thatcher, are numbered 12,162, 12,163, and 12,164 in the Regesta of Jaffé-Loewenfeld, and printed in Migne, Patrologia Latina, Vol, CC, cols. 883 ff. They all have the same date, 20 September, and it is certain, he says, that they were written in 1172. Cardinal Gasquet writes that they were first published in 1728 by Hearne in the Liber Niger Scaccarii, the Black Book of the Exchequer, and are addressed to the Irish Bishops, to the English king, and to the Irish princes. While they all have the same date of 20 September, and are written from Tusculum, he suggest that they are attributed to the year 1170.

In the letter to Henry, according to Thatcher, Alexander beseeches Henry to preserve whatever rights St. Peter already actually exercises in Ireland, and expresses confidence that Henry will be willing to acknowledge his duty. In this letter, Thatcher notes, there is no mention of Adrian IV, or any document issued by him, and there is nothing that can possibly be interpreted as a reference to Laudabiliter.

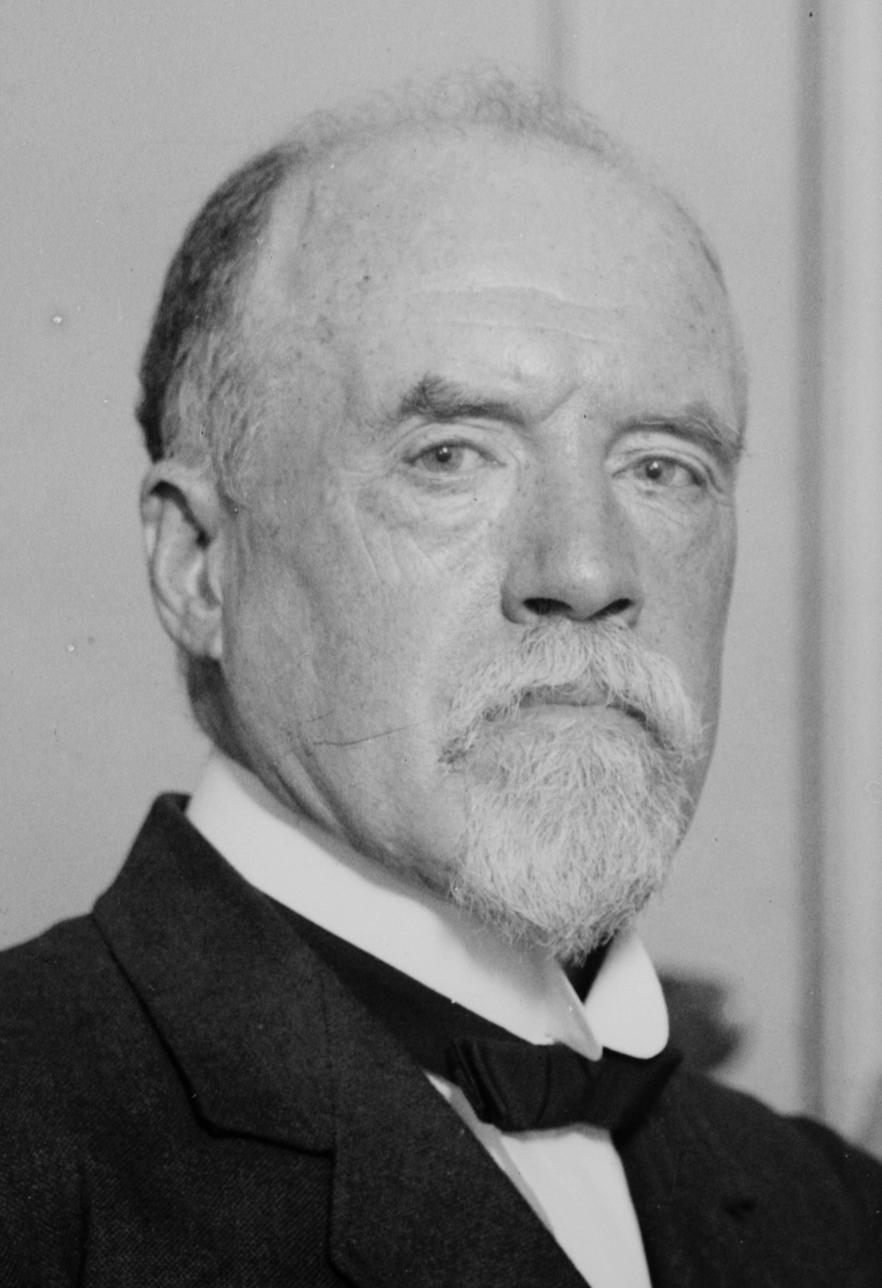
Laurence Ginnell (1854–1923)

On the letters of Alexander III, Cardinal Gasquet cites the editor of the Analecta who notes that they completely ignore the existence of Laudabiliter. The letters, he says, recognise no title or claim of Henry to dominion except "the power of the monarch, and the submission of the chiefs". They do mention the Pope's rights over all islands, and ask Henry to preserve these rights. This proves, he says, that the grant of Adrian was unknown in Rome as completely as it was in England and Ireland. Such a deduction is confirmed, he says, by the action later of Pope John XXII with the Ambassadors of Edward II at the beginning of the 14th century. Although the author of the article in the Analecta does not agree with Dr. Moran as to the authentic character of these documents, he admits that they, at least, form some very powerful arguments against the genuineness of Pope Adrian's grant.

Citing Matthew of Westminster, Father Burke notes that "Henry obliged every man in England, from the boy of twelve years up to the old man, to renounce their allegiance to the true Pope, and go over to an anti-Pope"; and asks whether it was likely that Alexander would give Henry a letter to settle ecclesiastical matters in Ireland. Father Burke, citing Alexander who wrote to Henry, notes that instead of referring to a document giving him permission to settle Church matters in Ireland Alexander said:

Instead of remedying the disorders caused by your predecessors, you have oppressed the Church, and you have endeavored to destroy the canons of apostolic men.

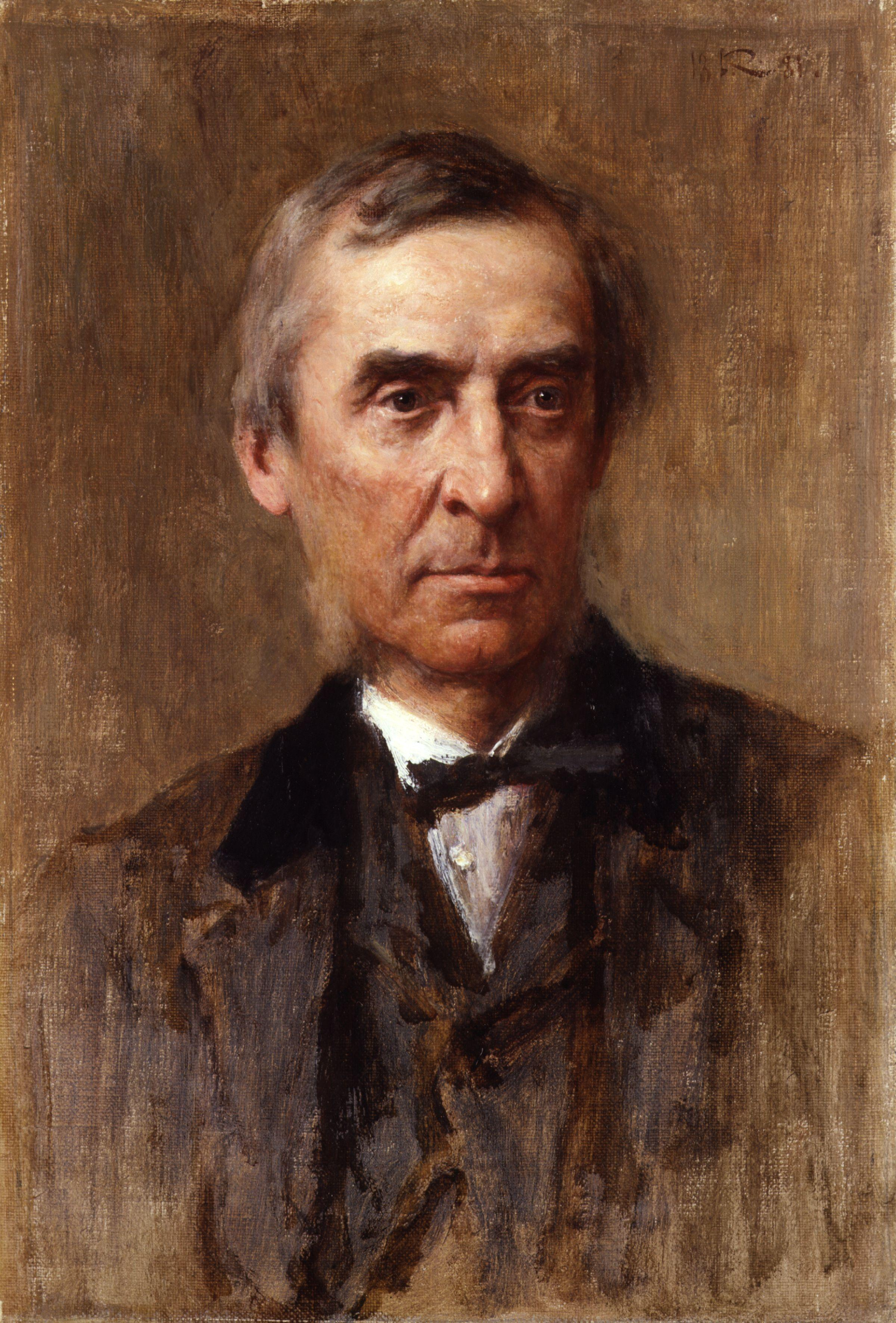
James Anthony Froude

However, Curtis in his History of Ireland suggests that Henry was at this time in May 1172 reconciled with the Papacy. Father Burke notes that Alexander's letter carried the date 1172 and asked whether it is likely that the Pope would have given a letter to Henry, asking him to take care of the Church and put everything in order.

Burke points out that Adrian did not know Henry, but Alexander knew him well. Henry, he says, in 1159 supported the antipope Octavianus against Alexander and opposed him again in 1166, this time supporting the antipope Guido. Father Burke then asks, "is this the man that Alexander would send to Ireland to settle affairs, and make the Irish good children of the Pope?" Responding again to Froude, who then said that "the Irish never loved the Pope till the Normans taught them", Father Burke notes that until "the accursed Normans came to Ireland", the Papal Legate could always come and go as he pleased and that no Irish king obstructed him and that no Irishman's hand was ever raised against a bishop, "much less against the Papal Legate". However, of the very first Legate that came to Ireland after the Norman Invasion, Father Burke writes, in passing through England, Henry "took him by the throat, and imposed upon him an oath that, when he went to Ireland, he would not do anything that would be against the interest of the King". It was unheard of that a bishop, archbishop, or cardinal should be persecuted, Burke says, until the Anglo-Normans brought with them "their accursed feudal system, and concentration of power in the hands of the king".

According to Curtis, the Pope sent another privilege which was published by papal envoys after the Synod of Waterford, which he said conferred on Henry the dominion over the Irish people. Whatever we may think of the so-called Bull of Adrian, says Curtis, there can be no doubt that the letters and privilege of Alexander conferred the lordship of Ireland upon Henry II. Herbert Paul says that James Anthony Froude also maintained that the existence of Laudabiliter was proved by this later letter. However, Father Burke said that he preferred to believe that it was a forgery.

== Controversy ==
The controversy regarding Laudabiliter generally focusses on one of three perspectives: the document is authentic; it is a forgery, or it is a modified version of the original.

=== In favour of authenticity ===
John Lingard, John Lanigan, Stephen J. McCormick, and P. S. O'Hegarty have defended the authenticity of the Laudabiliter, and English writers generally have accepted it as genuine. According to Ginnell, Sylvester Malone, D.D., Vicar General of Killaloe, was the most strenuous upholder of both letters. English historians according to Gasquet, have universally taken the genuineness of the document for granted. Michael Richter concludes the bull is authentic.

Ginnell notes the entire absence of any mention in Scottish Gaelic writings. However, Arthur Ua Clerigh argues in favor of the bull based upon a text of Laudabiliter in the Book of Leinster. To the text of the bull are prefixed the following headings: "Ah! men of the faith of the world, how beautiful [so far Gaelic] when over the cold sea in ships Zephyrus wafts glad tidings" [Latin] a Bull granted to the King of the English on the collation, i.e. grant, of Hibernia, in which nothing is derogated from the rights of the Irish, as appears by the words of the text. Ua Clerigh holds this was almost certainly written, and probably by his old tutor Aedh McCrimthainn, during the lifetime of Diarmaid MacMurchada, who was banished in 1157, and died in 1171.

Irish historians who have accepted John of Salisbury's account of Laudabiliter suggest that Adrian was purposely deceived as to the state of Ireland at the time thus giving rise to the necessity of the English interference by the king, and have regarded the "Bull" as a document granted in error as to the real circumstances of the case.

Eleanor Hull (1860-1935), a.k.a. Eibhlín Ní Choill, accepted in 1931 that there was a debate about the continuing existence of the document, but that the clear intent of the Papacy from at least 1172 onwards was that the Lordship had been assigned to Henri with its consent. She wrote of the critics: "... none of these writers notices the important fact that through the whole of the Middle Ages and up to late times the Bull was accepted without question as genuine both by the Irish nation and by the Vatican. The Privilege of Pope Alexander III, Adrian's successor, confirmed the Bull, and his letters to the King, to the clergy and bishops of Ireland, and to the nobles, enforced obedience to it. A copy existing in the Book of Leinster, on a fly-leaf (p. 342 of the facsimile), shows that in the thirteenth century, to which date this copy is ascribed, it was looked upon as part of the historical material belonging to that province."

Writing about the 1317 Remonstrance (see below), the historian J. R. S. Phillips has said that "it demonstrates that in the early fourteenth century Pope Adrian IV's bull Laudabiliter, in which he had urged Henry II of England to conquer Ireland, was regarded even by enemies of the English as a key element in the English monarchy’s claims to the lordship of Ireland".

=== Against authenticity ===
Goddard Henry Orpen notes that as early as 1615 Laudabiliter was denounced as a forgery by Stephen White, to be followed by John Lynch in 1662 and later still by Abbé Mac Geoghegan. Francis Aidan Gasquet writes that during the residence of the pontifical court at Avignon two Lives of Pope Adrian IV were written. One was composed in 1331 and the second in 1356. In neither is there any mention of this important act of the Pope, although the authors find a place for many less important documents.

Thomas N. Burke O.P., in his English Misrule in Ireland: A Course of Lectures in Reply to J. A Froude, puts forward a number of arguments against both the Bull of Adrian and the letters of his successor, Pope Alexander III. Burke questions the date on Laudabiliter, in addition to the terms contained in it and how it was obtained, questioning also the date in which it was first produced by Henry and why. Patrick Francis Moran also disputed the bull's authenticity in a November 1872 article in the Irish Ecclesiastical Record.

Professor Anne Duggan's research indicates that Laudabiliter is a falsification of an existing letter and that was not in fact Adrian's intention to grant Henry the rights he claimed.

=== In favour of an edited version ===
A number of scholars have drawn a distinction between the letter given to John of Salisbury and the subsequent bull Laudabiliter.

According to Arthur Ua Clerigh, the letter referred to was not Laudabiliter, but a formal letter of investiture, such as was used in the case of Robert Guiscard in Italy. Historian Paul Scheffer-Boichorst regards the donation as indisputable, while rejecting Laudabiliter as a forgery, as does Felix Liebermann. Oliver Joseph Thatcher's Studies Concerning Adrian IV; I. The Offer of Ireland to Henry II reproduces the arguments of Boichorst.

Textual scholar Anne Duggan of King's College, London, is of the opinion that Laudabiliter is a falsification of a genuine letter, now lost. Professor Duggan demonstrated that arranging the paragraphs in a more conventional manner, reveals a more cautious statement that "fits very closely with a known letter of Adrian IV, advising the kings of France and England not to go forward with a planned crusade to Spain unless they consulted the 'princes, churches and people of the region'". Duggan suggests that Adrian IV did not wish to alienate the most powerful prince in Europe, but insisted on the consent of the Irish.

Ginnell has written that those who accept Laudabiliter as authentic can be equally divided on its significance. Some use it with the object of exposing the Papacy's venality, corruption, and "ingratitude towards mankind in general, and towards faithful Ireland in particular" while others cite it as proof that Ireland has always been the object of the "Pope's special paternal care". Another argument, again assuming the authenticity of Laudabiliter, is that it would be tantamount to the Pope having made a shockingly bad choice of an instrument in Henry II for reducing Ireland to law and order.

== Papal copy of Laudabiliter ==
Caesar Baronius, in his work, the Annales Ecclesiastici, groups the Laudabiliter in an appendix of doubtful documents. He indicated that he derived it from the Codex Vaticanus, but in such condition that he could not determine its date. Patrick F. Moran determined that the codex mentioned was a manuscript copy of a history by Matthew of Paris, which he copied from Roger de Wendover's Chronica which included a copy of Giraldus.

Curtis in his A History of Ireland from Earliest Times to 1922 states that there is no original or copy of Laudabiliter in the papal archives. While accepting that there is no copy of Laudabiliter in the papal archives, Mackie suggests that this proves nothing, for there is at Rome no document dealing with the affairs of Ireland before the year 1215.

=== Synod of Waterford 1175 ===
Gerald of Wales asserts the Bulls of Adrian and Alexander were read at a meeting of Bishops in Waterford in 1175, during which Laudabiliter was used by the Papacy as evidence showing the clergy of England and Ireland were solely under papal supremacy.

== Papal letter of 1311 and the Irish Kings' Remonstrance of 1317 ==
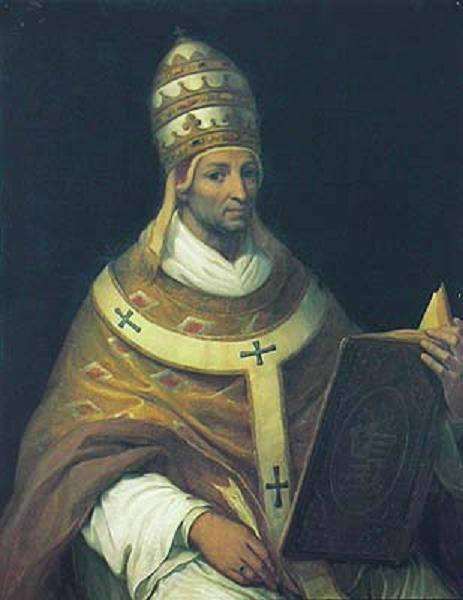
Pope John XXII

Within a century-and-a-half, Norman misrule in Ireland became so apparent that Laudabiliter was to be invoked again, this time in aid of the rights of the Gaelic Irish clans. Pope Clement V had written to Edward II of England in 1311 reminding him of the responsibility that Laudabiliter put upon him to execute government in Ireland for the welfare of the Irish. He warned Edward II that:

... the kings of England ... have in direct violation of [Laudabiliter], for a long period past kept down that people [of Ireland] in a state of intolerable bondage, accompanied with unheard-of hardships and grievances. Nor was there found during all that time, any person to redress the grievances they endured or be moved with a pitiful compassion for their distress; although recourse was had to you ... and the loud cry of the oppressed fell, at times at least, upon your own ear. In consequence whereof, unable to support such a state of things any longer, they have been compelled to withdraw themselves from your jurisdiction and to invite another to come and be ruler over them ...

After the excommunicated Robert the Bruce defeated King Edward II of England at Bannockburn, his younger brother Edward launched an invasion of Ireland, in 1316. Edward's Gaelic allies, before their defeat and the death of the Bruce, at the Battle of Faughart in 1318, enclosed a copy of Laudabiliter on a Remonstrance sent to Pope John XXII, requesting the bull be revoked and the papacy recognise Edward Bruce as King of Ireland. Led by Domnall mac Brian Ó Néill and Tír Eógain, their petition was refused:

... in the year of the Lord 1155, at the false and wicked representation of King Henry of England, under whom and perhaps by whom St. Thomas of Canterbury, as you know, in that very year suffered death for justice and defence of the church, Pope Adrian, your predecessor, an Englishman not so much by birth as by feeling and character, did in fact, but unfairly, confer upon that same Henry (whom for his said offence he should rather have been deprived of his own kingdom) this lordship of ours by a certain form of words, the course of justice entirely disregarded and the moral vision of that great pontiff blinded, alas! by his English proclivities.

One could interpret this to mean that the kings believed that Laudabiliter was the ultimate legal basis for their continuing problems at that time. In the meantime they had misremembered the year of Becket's death (1170, not 1155), but painfully recalled the date of Laudabiliter. In its date, style and contents the Remonstrance argues against the attempts to negate the bull centuries later. It is also clear from these documents that Clement V wanted Edward II to promote a more tolerant administration in Ireland, but without going so far as to revoke the bull of 1155. Given that he was a Pope during the controversial Avignon Papacy, John XXII was not in a position to alienate the support of kings such as Edward II.

== Laudabiliter and the Kingdom of Ireland 1542–1555 ==
Laudabiliter had a continuing political relevance into the 16th century. Henry VIII of England was excommunicated by Pope Paul III on 17 December 1538, causing his opponents to question his continuing claim to be Lord of Ireland, which was based ultimately on Laudabiliter. Henry established the Kingdom of Ireland in 1542, whereby the kingdom was to be ruled in personal union with the Kingdom of England. This was not recognised by Europe's Roman Catholic monarchs. Therefore, in 1555 a further papal bull Ilius, per quem Reges regnant was issued by Pope Paul IV naming Queen Mary and her husband Philip (later Philip II of Spain) as monarchs of Ireland.
