= Domhnall Ua Dubhthaigh =

Domhnall Ua Dubhthaigh, Archbishop of Connacht, died 1136.

The post of Archbishop of Connacht was a precursor to that of Archbishop of Tuam.

His death is noted in the Annals of the Four Masters as follows:

Domhnall Ua Dubhthaigh, Archbishop of Connaught, and successor of Ciaran, head of the wisdom and hospitality of the province, died after mass and celebration at Cluain-fearta-Brenainn.

The Annals of Loch Cé have his obit sub anno 1137, describing him as "Domhnall Ua Dubhthaigh, bishop of Elphin, and comarb of Ciaran of Cluain-mic-Nois."

Preceded by Cathasach Ua Conaill	Archbishop of Connacht; 1117-1136	Succeeded by Muireadhach Ua Dubhthaigh
