= Dub Chablaigh ingen Cathal =

Dub Chablaigh ingen Cathal, (also Dub Choblaig), Empress of the Irish, wife of Brian Boru, died 1009.

== Background ==
Dubh Chablaigh was a daughter of King Cathal mac Conchobar mac Taidg of Connacht, who died in 1010. Her mother's identity is uncertain. Her brothers and half-brothers were Tadg in Eich Gil, Brian, Conchobor, In Cléirech, and Tadhg Díreach.

== Marriage and issue ==
She was a wife of Brian Boru, whom she married sometime after 981, and is thought to have been the mother of his son, Domnall, who died in 1010 or 1011. He was survived by a son, Diarmait, who died in 1051. Brian had three known daughters but it is unknown if Dub Chablaigh was the mother of any of them.

== Title ==
Brian styled himself Emperor of the Irish in 1005 at Armagh, which is the origin of her title.

== See also ==
- Dubhchobhlaigh

== Family tree ==
    Cathal mac Conchobar mac Taidg, d. 1010.     
    |
    |______________________________________________________________________________________________________
    |                     |                            |          |             |                       |
    |                     |                            |          |             |                       |
    Dub Chablaigh   Tadg in Eich Gil, d. 1030.   Brian,     Conchobor,    In Cléirech, fl. 1044.  Tadhg Díreach
   =Brian Boru           =?                           d. 1029      fl. 1029.    |                       |
    |                     |                                                     |_________              |
    |                     |                                                     |        |              An Gilla Lónach
    Domnall?              Áed in Gai Bernaig,                                   |        |
    |                      King of Connacht,                                    Tadg,    Conchobar,
    |                         died 1067.                                       d.1056.    d. 1069.
    Diarmait,              
    d. 1051.
