= Synod of Cashel =

The Synod of Cashel of 1172, also known as the Second Synod of Cashel, (Note: The first being the Synod held at Cashel in 1101.) was assembled at Cashel at the request of Henry II of England shortly after his arrival in Ireland in October 1171. The synod sought to regulate some affairs of the church in Ireland and to condemn some abuses, bringing the church more into alignment with the Roman Rite. As such it can be seen as a continuation and part of the Irish church reform of the twelfth century, with the first synod of Cashel, the Synod of Rathbreasail and the Synod of Kells, slowly embracing the Gregorian Reforms. The extent to which the synod set the direction for the relationship between the English and the Irish church has been the subject of scholarly debate. Stephen J. McCormick described the synod as one of the most important events of this period of Irish history.

The synod is not mentioned in Irish sources, so historians have had to rely on other sources, in particular Giraldus Cambrensis' (Gerald of Wales) account in the Expugnatio Hibernica (Conquest of Ireland). In his account of the synod he lists the "constitutions" of the synods, "verbatim, as they were published".

== The meeting of the Synod ==
Upon his arrival in Ireland, Henry went to Lismore. This was the see of Gilla Críst Ua Connairche (Christianus), who was native papal legate to Ireland. Henry also visited Cashel and Dublin, and thus had the opportunity to meet the archbishops Donnchad Ua hUallacháin of Cashel and Lawrence O'Toole of Dublin. According to Martin Holland, arrangements for a synod to meet at Cashel soon afterwards were put in place through these contacts. Giraldus lists these three bishops, as well as Cadla Ua Dubthaig, Archbishop of Tuam (Note: named as "Catholicus Tuotuenensis archiepisopi" (Expugnatio, XXXIV)) among the clergy of Ireland attending the synod, "with their suffragans and fellow-bishops, together with the abbots, archdeacons, priors, and deans, and many other Irish prelates". Gilla Meic Liac mac Diarmata (Gelasius), Archbishop of Armagh and Primate of Ireland, did not attend. According to McCormick he refused to attend. Giraldus relates that his absence was due to "infirmities and advanced age", and that he afterwards came to Dublin to give his assent "to the royal will in all these matters".

== Acts of the synod ==
Giraldus lists seven acts or "constitutions" of the synod, here given in the translation of William Gouan Todd: (Note: For a different translation, see The Conquest of Ireland, chapter XIV. For the Latin text see Topographia hibernica, et Expugnatio hibernica.)

1. That the faithful throughout Ireland do contract and observe lawful marriages rejecting those with their relations either by consanguinity or affinity.
2. That infants be catechised before the door of the church and baptised in the holy font in the baptismal churches.
3. That all the faithful do pay the tithe of animals corn and other produce to the church of which they are parishioners.
4. That all ecclesiastical lands and property connected with them be quite exempt from the exactions of all laymen. And especially that neither the petty kings nor counts nor any powerful men in Ireland nor their sons with their families do exact, as was usual, victuals and hospitality or entertainments in the ecclesiastical districts or presume to extort them by force and that the detestable food or contributions, which used to be required four times in the year from the farms belonging to churches by the neighbouring counts, shall not be claimed any more.
5. That in case of a murder committed by laymen and of their compounding for it with their enemies clergymen their relatives are not to pay part of the fine (or erick) but that as they were not concerned in the perpetration of the murder so they are to be exempted from the payment of money.
6. That all the faithful lying in sickness do in the presence of their confessor and neighbours make their will with due solemnity dividing in case they have wives and children excepting their debts and servants wages their moveable goods into three parts and bequeathing one for the children and another for the lawful wife and the third for the funeral obsequies. And if haply they have no lawful progeny, let the goods be divided into two parts between himself and his wife. And if his lawful wife be dead, let them be divided between himself and his children.
7. That to those who die with a good confession due respect be paid by means of masses and wakes and a decent burial. Likewise that all divine matters be henceforth conducted agreeably to the practices of the holy Church according as observed by the English Church.

== The seventh act ==
Giraldus lists these seven acts numbered as primo, secundus, etc. until septimus, as related in Todd's translation above. The last part of the seventh act concerns the relationship between the English and Irish Church. According to Marie Therese Flanagan,

some historians have interpreted this as an actual decree of the synod, and have seen in it the origins of a policy of anglicisation of the Irish church pursued by the Angevin kings in Ireland. Thus, the synod of Cashel is often the starting point of any account of episcopal appointments in Ireland after the coming of the Normans and the extension of the electoral procedure of the English church to the Irish church is presumed to derive in principle from this decree.

Flanagan, however, points out that, as it stands in Giraldus' account, this sentence refers only to the liturgical practices of the English church. She also questions whether this part is a part of the decrees of the synod, stating that "it appears to be rather Gerald's own comment on what would be attempted by Irish churchmen. Martin Holland does not include this part in his overview of the enacted decrees, but adds:

It was also decided that in Ireland, all matters relating to religion were to follow the observances of the English church. Some have interpreted this as referring to liturgical practices only; others see it as encompassing more, and therefore being much more fundamental, especially since it is claimed that the Irish bishops swore fealty to Henry at around this time.

== See also ==
- Synod of Rathbreasail (1111)
- Synod of Kells (1152)
- Roman Catholic Archdiocese of Cashel and Emly

== References and notes ==
=== Bibliography ===
- Flanagan, Marie Therese (1996). "Henry II, the council of Cashel and the Irish bishops". Peritia. 10. Brepols Publishers: 184–211. doi:10.1484/J.Peri.3.7. ISSN 0332-1592.
- Flanagan, Marie Therese (1977). "Hiberno-Papal relations in the late twelfth century". Archivium Hibernicum. 34: 55–70. doi:10.2307/25487421. JSTOR 25487421.
- Giraldus Cambrensis (1867). James Francis Dimock (ed.). Topographia hibernica, et Expugnatio hibernica. Vol. V. London: Longmans, Green, Reader, and Dyer.
- Giraldus Cambrensis (2001). Thomas Forester and Thomas Wright (ed.). The Conquest of Ireland (PDF). Cambridge, Ontario: In parentheses Publications.
- Holland, Martin (2005). "Cashel, synod of II (1172)". In Seán Duffy (ed.). Medieval Ireland. An Encyclopedia. Abingdon and New York. pp. 66–67.
- McCormick, Stephen J. (1889). The Pope and Ireland. San Francisco: A. Waldteufel.
- Todd, William Gouan. A History of the ancient church in Ireland. p. Chapter XII.
- Warren, W. L. (1997). "Church and state in Angevin Ireland". Chronicon. 1 (6): 1–17. ISSN 1393-5259.
