= Owen Ó hEidhin =

King of Uí Fiachrach Aidhne

Owen Ó hEidhin (died 1253) was King of Uí Fiachrach Aidhne.

== Background and succession ==
The succession to the rule of Aidhne after the death of Muirgheas Ua hEidhin in 1180 is unclear. The death of Muirgheas's son, Conor, is reported in 1201 but he is not referred to as king. In 1211 "Cugaela Ó hEidhin died", again, without context. "Donough Ó hEidhin was deprived of sight by the son of Cathal Crovderg, without the consent of the O'Conor" in 1212 but again there is no reference to this person ruling the territory.

The years 1222–1224 mention dynastic strife with " Gilla Mo Choinni Ó Cahill, Lord of Kinelea East and West, was slain by Shaughnessy, the son of Gilla na Naemh Crom Ó Seachnasaigh, after having been betrayed by his own people." In 1223 "Seachnasaigh Ó Seachnasaigh, the son of Gilla na Naemh Ó Seachnasaigh, was slain by the Clann-Cuilen, a deed by which the Bachal mor of St. Colman, of Kilmacduagh was profaned." Gilla na Naemh, recorded as Lord of the Western half of Kinelea of Echtge died in 1224.

== The War of 1225 ==
Ó hEidhin is first mentioned as king of Aidhne during the war of 1225.

Aed Meith Ua Neill invaded Connacht to aid Donn Óge Mag Oireachtaigh who had been deprived of his lands by King Aedh Ua Conchobair. The war resulted in Ua Conchobair been usurped by Aedh mac Ruaidri Ua Conchobair, who Ó hEidhin supported.

While these events were taking place:

the inhabitants of the southern side of Connaught ... were not in a state of tranquility at this period, for the English of Leinster and Munster, with Murtough O'Brien, the English of Desmond, and the sheriff of Cork, had made an irruption upon them, and slew all the people that they caught, and burned their dwellings and villages. Hugh, the son of Cathal Crovderg, was displeased at their coming on this expedition; for it was not he that sent for them, but were themselves excited by envy and rapacity, as soon as they had heard what good things the Lord Justice and his English followers had obtained in Connaught at that time. Woeful was the misfortune, which God permitted to fall upon the best province in Ireland at that time! for the young warriors did not spare each other, but preyed and plundered each other to the utmost of their power. Women and children, the feeble, and the lowly poor, perished by cold and famine in this war!

Donough Cairbreach Ó Briain sent some of his people, together with the spoils of battle, ahead of him back to Thomond. However, Aedh mac Ruaidri Ua Conchobair and Owen Ó hEidhin were alerted to this, and "went before them with a few select men, defeated the Momonians, deprived them of their spoils, and detained some of their nobles as hostages."

Aedh Ua Conchobair was restored but soon after his English supporters left the kingdom, Áedh Mór Ó Flaithbheartaigh with "all the other nobles, revolted against him, and joined the sons of Roderic." King Aed obtained aid from the English of Leinster "under the conduct of William Grace and the sons of Griffin."

Aedh sent his brother Felim Ua Conchobair with a mixed force of Irish and English "into Hy-Fiachrach Aidhne, to plunder Owen O'Heyne. These encamped for one night at Ardrahen, with a view to plunder the country early in the morning following."

Ó Flaithbheartaigh and the Ó Conchobair's were en route to join Aedh mac Ruaidri when they received intelligence that

"the English had gone to plunder their sworn partisan, Owen O'Heyne, and were stationed at Ardrahan, did not abandon their friend, but, with one mind and accord, followed the English until they came very close to them. They then held a council, and came to the resolution of sending Tuathal, the son of Murtough O'Conor, and Taichleach O'Dowda, with numerous forces, into the town, while O'Flaherty and the other son of Murtough were to remain with their forces outside Tuathal and Taichleach, with a strong body of their soldiers, marched spiritedly and boldly into the town, and made a powerful attack upon the English there, who were routed east and west. They pursued those who fled eastwards. Tuathal wounded the constable of the English with his first shot; and Taichleach, by another shot, gave him so deep a wound, that he was left lifeless. As to the English who were routed westwards from the town, they were met by O'Flaherty and the other son of Murtough; but it happened, through their evil destiny, that the English routed them immediately. On this occasion Mahon, the son of Hugh, who was son of Conor Moinmoy; Gilchreest Mac Dermot; Niall, the son of Farrell O'Teige (Fearghal Ó Taidg an Teaghlaigh), and others, were slain; but the man who slew Niall O'Teige, i.e. the brother of Colen O'Dempsey, was slain himself also."

== 1232 ==
A Gilla Ceallaigh Ó hEidhin was killed in battle in the Tuathas fighting alongside Connor mac Aedh mac Ruaidhri, but his relationship to Owen is unclear. It was in 1232 that "The kingdom of Connaught was again given to Hugh, the son of Roderic", Owen's lord, and that de Burgh began building the castle of Galway.

== 1235 ==
A major expedition was led into Connacht by Richard Mór de Burgh. At Ardcarne, "the English held a private consultation, at the request of Owen O'Heyne, who wished to be revenged on the Momonians, and on Donough Cairbreach O'Brien." They determined to travel through Uí Maine and Máenmag to enter Thomond in secrecy, where they "committed great depredations."

The English forces were shadowed by King Felim Ua Conchobair, who, with the men of Munster,

came to a pitched battle with the English, and fought manfully. But the English cavalry and infantry, who were clad in armour, finally overcame them. Many were slain on both sides, but the Momonians suffered most loss, through the imprudence of Donough Cairbreach. The Connacians then returned home, and on the next day O'Brien made peace with the English, and gave them hostages.

Returning to Connacht, Owen and the English, now joined by Áedh Mór Ó Flaithbheartaigh, found the kingdom desolate as Fedlim had ordered all its peoples to take themselves and their livestock out of their route. The English invaded Achill, while Ó Flaithbheartaigh and Ó hEidhin "also came round with a great army, having vessels with them, which they carried by land as far as Linan Cinn-mara. These vessels, with their forces, being met by the Lord Justice at Druimni, were brought to the Callow of Inis-Aenaigh."

The joint armies plundered Achill and its surrounding islands, killing all they found upon it. The land around Clew Bay, belonging to the Ó Máille clan, was extensively plundered "both by sea and land". The expedition then raided Domnall Mór Ó Domhnaill in Tír Chonaill and proceeded to raid on their way to Loch Cé. Here the English returned to Mide and the Irish to south and west Connacht.

== 1236 ==
The Lord Justice of Ireland, Mac Maurice, summoned the English of Ireland to meet him at Ath-feorainne, at which meeting Felim, the son of Cathal Crovderg O'Conor, was present. They all yearned to act treacherously towards Felim, although he was the gossip of the Lord Justice; and this was the reason that the meeting had been called. Felim having received intelligence and forewarning of their design, departed from the assembly; and, attended by a few horsemen, proceeded to Roscommon. He was pursued thither and as far as the bridge of Sligo; he fled to O'Donnell for protection. As they did not overtake him they committed great acts of plunder upon Teige O'Conor, and carried away many respectable women into captivity and bondage; they then proceeded to Druim Gregruighe in Moylurg, where the Lord Justice awaited their return. The meeting above mentioned was called immediately after the departure of Richard, the son of William Burke, for England.

Felim, the son of Cathal Crovderg, returned to Connaught, having been invited thither by some of the Connacians, namely, by O'Kelly, O'Flynn, the son of Hugh, who was son of Cathal Crovderg O'Conor, and the son of Art O'Melaghlin; all forming four equally strong battalions. They marched to Rindown, where Brian, the son of Turlough, Owen O'Heyne, Conor Boy, son of Turlough, and Mac Costello, had all the cows of the country. Felim's people passed over the ramparts and ditches of the island recte peninsula, and every chief of a band and head of a troop among them drove off a proportionate number of the cows, as they found them on the way before them; after which they dispersed, carrying off their booty, in different directions, and of the four battalions, leaving only four horsemen with Felim.

When Brian, the son of Turlough, Owen O'Heyne, and their forces, observed that Felim's people were dispersed with their spoils, they set off actively and quickly with a small party of horse and many foot-soldiers to attack Felim and his few men. Conor Boy, son of Turlough, did not perceive his situation until he came up with Rory, son of Hugh, son of Cathal Crovderg, and, mistaking him for one of his own people, he fell by him.

Felim (the King) strained his voice calling after his army, and commanding them to abandon the spoils and rally to fight their enemies. Many of the enemy's forces were killed in this rencounter by Felim and his people, upon the island and outside the island; all excommunicated persons and doers of evil, excepting only Teige, son of Cormac, who was son of Tomaltagh Mac Dermot. As soon as Mac William learned how O'Conor had defeated all who had turned against him, he joined him to reduce them. Dermot, the son of Manus, upon hearing this, went over to Manus, the son of Murtough O'Conor.

After this Mac William proceeded to Tuam da ghualann, without notice or forewarning, and thence to Mayo of the Saxons, and left neither rick nor basket of corn in the large churchyard of Mayo, or in the yard of the church of St. Michael the Archangel, and carried away eighty baskets out of the churches themselves. They afterwards went to Turlagh, on which they inflicted a similar calamity. They then sent a body of men to plunder the people of Dermot, the son of Manus, and these falling in with the people of Conor Roe, and the inhabitants of Turlagh, they plundered them all indiscriminately; and Manus was compelled to expel and banish Dermot's people from him. On the following day Conor Roe went into Mac William's house, made peace with him, and received a restoration of the prey of cows which had been taken from him; and such part of their cattle as the people of the church of Turlagh were able to recognise as their own was restored to them. Dermot, the son of Manus, also went into the house of i.e. submitted to the English, that they might spare such of his people and cattle as were then remaining with him. Mac William proceeded to Balla, where he stopped for one night, and went thence to Tuam da ghualann. He left the province of Connaught without peace or tranquillity, and without food in any church or territory within it.

The following year "The barons of Ireland went to Connaught, and commenced erecting castles there."

== Death ==
"Owen Ó hEidhin, Lord of Hy-Fiachrach Aidhne, died." in 1253.

Preceded by Muirgheas Ua hEidhin	King of Uí Fiachrach Aidhne before 1225–1253	Succeeded by Eoghan Ó hEidhin
