= List of sieges of Galway =

List of sieges and battles in Galway Ireland

Coordinates: 53°16′19″N 9°2′56″W

Ireland and Galway

The city of Galway Ireland was built as a naval base and military fort by Tairrdelbach mac Ruaidri Ua Conchobair in 1124. It was refounded as a military outpost and town by Richard Mor de Burgh in 1230. It has been subjected to a number of battles, sacks and sieges. This article enumerates the history of military conflict in Galway.

== Dun Beal Gallimhe ==
Dun Beal Gallimhe can be translated as "fort at the mouth of the Gallimhe river." It is believed to have been situated on the site of the present Customs House. This building is situated in the heart of the old medieval city between Quay Street to the north, Flood Street to the south, Druid Lane to the east and Quay Lane to the west. Subsequent to the founding of Galway in 1232, a castle and hall were built upon the site. The latter building was known as the Red Earl's hall and was excavated in 1999.

There is some slight evidence for Viking use of the area, at least as a seasonal camp, as the Danes of Limerick made a number of devastating raids in the area in the 9th and 10th centuries, and though the annalistic evidence is ambiguous, seem to have made some sort of semi-permanent camp along the river or in Lough Corrib. Be that as it may, the earliest known building was erected there in 1124 at the instigation of High King Tairrdelbach mac Ruaidri Ua Conchobair.

Both as a naval base and military base Dun Beal Gallimhe offered several advantages. It was surrounded to the north by a number of small islands that, separated from the Dun by large streams and extremely boggy ground, made physical progress difficult and an attack futile. To the south it was bounded by muddy estuary flats and the effects of the tide which made approach from this side just as difficult. The Dun itself was raised at the very end of a thin peninsula of land that could withstand attack by a relatively small number of defenders. Due west was the river, which is one of the fastest-flowing in Europe, and yet almost the only ford on the river. If all was lost, defenders could withdraw to the west bank and flee into Iar Connacht. If, however, the attacking force could still not make the east bank, there were only two other routes to the other side, neither favourable: one was to risk a crossing of Lough Corrib, which however can be treacherous at the best of times to an unskilled sailor; second, the unenviable sixty mile slog north to Cong.

From a naval point of view Gallimhe did not make an especially desirable port, lacking a deep harbour. Up to the early 19th century smaller ships docked at the river quay, while larger ones remained at anchor out in the bay for unloading. Yet in the early days of its existence it offered a way into Lough Corrib and its surrounding landmass, from which an invader could strike deep into the heart of Delbhna Tir Dha Locha or Maigh Seola. Conversely it also offered a route out of the latter kingdom and a means to attack its ruler's enemies. Indeed, it was used in this capacity both in the 1160s and 1590s.

At least some of these factors played a part in subsequent sieges of the settlement. Only much later in its history it would be put to use as the premier merchant port and market of Ireland's west coast. By then it had far outgrown its initial raison d'être as seen by O Conchobair and de Burgh and become "the City of the Tribes" (see Tribes of Galway).

== O Brian's siege of 1132 ==
Naval-based warfare became something of a regular occurrence in early 12th century Ireland. The Annals of Inisfallen note raids of this nature occurring in 1100, 1101, 1119, and 1124. Perhaps this was what led to Tairrdelbach mac Ruaidri Ua Conchobair to build Dún Béal Gallimhe in 1124. It was located in Clan Fergal, the territory of the O Hallorans but was supervised by Ua Conchobair's vassals, the Ua Flaithbheartaigh, who at this time were still based in their homeland of Maigh Seola.

During the summer of 1132, Conchobhair O Brian of Thomond (modern north Munster) invaded Hy-Many where he "plundered ... Maenmhagh ... [and] carried off many cows." This raid was purely of a plundering nature, yet apparently within a very short period of time, he followed it up with a full-scale assault on O Conchobair's new naval base at Dún Béal Gallimhe. The Annals of the Four Masters noted that "The castle of Bun-Gaillmhe was burned and demolished [by] a fleet of the men of Munster." The Munstermen then followed this up with a devastating raid on both Clan Fergal and Magh Seola, for the same annals note that "A great slaughter was made of the Connachtmen by the men of Munster, wherein Conchobhar Ua Flaithbheartaigh, lord of West Connacht" was slain.

Also among the dead were "the two sons of Cathal Ua Mughroin" and Ua Taidhg "an Teaghlaigh". This is significant because the Ua Mughroin were a sept native to Hy-Many, some distance from Gallimhe which was in any case historically based in a different territory, Clann Fergal. Therefore, they must have travelled some distance to be present to fight against the forces from Munster, possibly in a levy raised by Tairrdelbach himself. Ua Taidgh's nickname, An Teaghlaigh, indicates that he was of the household, or indeed the household bodyguard, of Tairrdelbach, who would of necessity have only accompanied the High King. Therefore, the deaths of members of these three vassal clans, as well as his own possible presence at the battle, indicates the importance the High King attached to his "dún" on the Gallimhe. This is underlined by the fact that it was rebuilt, which can be inferred by a further attack in 1149.

== O Brian's siege of 1149 ==
The 1149 siege of Dún Béal Gallimhe was led by Toirdhealbhach O Brían, then King of Thomond. It was a combined raid of plunder (taking the rich pickings of Maigh Seola) and military strategy (destroying the Dún).

In the years immediately prior to 1149, the respective interests of Connacht - still ruled by High King Tairrdelbach mac Ruaidri Ua Conchobair - and of Thomond had were confined to putting down rebellions and civil strife in their kingdoms, as well as maintaining their areas of interest. Ruaidri was frequently at odds with the O Neills in Ulster and Meath, and had a sometime antagonistic relationship with Tighernan O Rúairc, King of Brefine, which was a buffer state carved out of disputed territory between Connacht and Ulster.

Toirdhealbhach O Brían on the other hand was pre-occupied with extending his influence into Leinster (the kingdom whose rejection of tributes had led to his ancestor, Brian Boru's, death in 1014), as well as with putting down rebellion in his native Thomond and with ensuring his vassals of Munster, the MacCarthys, knew their place. Both Kings had in fact ratified a treaty at Terryglass Monastery in 1144, possibly to recognise and respect their spheres of influence.

However the following year Toirdhealbhach was decisively defeated by O Conchobair and his vassals at Feara Ceall in the Sliabh Bloom; O Brian had been en route to Meath to fight O Ruairc but had been intercepted by O Conchobair. O Brian was forced to return home, "without prey, without hostage, without peace, without truce." This brought O Brian and O Conchobhair into open war; O Brian struck within the same year with "an army into Connacht; and they carried off Ua Ceallaigh, i.e. Tadhg, son of Conchobhar, lord of Ui-Maine, and slew Ruaidhri Ua Flaithbheartaigh". The death of Ua Flaithbheartaigh indicates that an attempt may have been made on Gallimhe, but O Brian would have to wait a full four years before he reached this objective.

According to the Four Masters, in 1149 "An army was led by Toirdhealbhach Ua Briain and the men of Munster into Connacht, until they arrived at Magh Ua mBriuin; they carried off a great spoil of cattle, and demolished Dún-Gaillmhe; and Ua Lochlainn, lord of Corca-Modhruadh, was drowned in the (river) Gaillimh." Again, the mention of Magh Ua mBriuin - an alternative name for Maigh Seola - demonstrates the destruction of Gallimhe and its fleet was merely one tactic employed by O Brian. Kinsmen and vassals would only stay loyal as long as a king could deliver the goods to ensure their loyalty, hence the rich plains were plundered of their goods, food and fine cattle. It also had the additional prize of weakening O Conchobair's prime vassal in the area, Ua Flaithbheartaigh.

Ua Lochlainn was of the Corcu Mo Druad, vassals of O Brian, and strategically located across Galway Bay. Thus it is possible that while O Brian led his army by land, Ua Lochlainn sailed across the bay and the two inflicted a sea-and-land siege of Gallimhe; this possibility is obliquely hinted at in the manner of Ua Lochlainn's death. It may even be that, contending for the lordship of Galway Bay - from which plundering raids could be made into Clan Fergal, Maigh Seola, Meadraige and Uí Fiachrach Aidhne - O Brian may have been letting Ua Lochlainn unleash himself against a prime adversary.

In a surprising turn of events, in 1151, O Brian was deposed as King of Munster by his son, Muircheartach. Muircheartach was subsequently captured "by treachery" by "Tadhg son of Diarmaid O Brian and Diarmaid Súgach O Conchobhair" and delivered to his father. However, Tadhg mac Diarmaid O Brian rose against O Brian in rebellion, with the result that "Toirdhealbhach son of Ruaidhrí O Conchobhair came with him to defend the kingship of Munster for him."!

== De Burgh's siege of 1230 ==
Cathal Crobderg Ua Conchobair had owed his position as King of Connacht to King John, and the support of the latter's vassals in Ireland. In addition, he was able to obtain recognition of his son, Aedh mac Cathal Crobdearg Ua Conchobair as his heir.

In the year after Cathal's death in 1224, Aedh had to face a rebellion by Donn Oge Mageraghty of Sil Muirdeag, Aedh Ua Flaithbertaigh of Maigh Seola and an invasion by O Neill of Tir Eoghain from Ulster. O Neill and Aedh's rebellious vassals then crowned Turlough mac Ruaidri O Conchobair King of Connacht in opposition to Aedh, who was supported by only a few vassals such as MacDermott of Moylourg and O Flynn of the Cuirc remaining loyal. With the help of his Norman allies, Aedh was eventually able to suppress the rebellion, though "there was not a church or territory in Connacht at that time that had not been plundered and desolated." The war was made worse by "An oppressive malady raged in the province of Connacht at this time: it was a heavy burning sickness, which left the large towns desolate, without a single survivor."

One incident during the war had given Aedh cause for concern: his erstwhile allies, the Normans of Leinster and Munster, had invaded south Connacht "and slew all the people that they caught, and burned their dwellings and villages." Aedh was furious at this because it was not by his command, and because the Normans "were themselves excited by envy and rapacity, as soon as they had heard what good things the Lord Justice and his English followers had obtained in Connacht at that time." It was a sign of things to come.

Aedh mac Cathal was murdered by the Normans in 1228 and Aedh mac Ruaidri Ua Conchobair was chosen by the Normans and the chiefs of Connacht to take his place. Yet in 1230 Aedh and his vassals turned on the Normans, vowing "they would never own a lord who should bring them to make submission to the Galls. They made then great raids on the Galls, Aed son of Ruaidri and the men of West Connacht plundering the young son of William and Adam Duff, while Donn Oc and the sons of Magnus with the new levies of Sil Murray plundered Mac Gosdelb and Tir Maine as far as Athlone." It was in response to this that Richard Mor de Burgh led an army into Connacht "and desolated a large portion of that country." De Burgh brought with him Felim mac Cathal Crobderg Ua Conchobair whom he intended to make king in place of Aedh. They crossed the Shannon at Athlone and made straight for Gallimhe.

The Dún at Gallimhe was being held and defended by Aedh Ua Flaithbertaig, who still held for Aedh mac Ruaidri (Ua Flaithbertaigh had been exiled into Iar Connacht by Aedh mac Cathal for his rebellion) . Apparently de Burgh was just reaching the Dún (and a highly apprehensive Ua Flaithbertaigh) "when Aed mac Ruaidri came to his help with the Connachtmen, including the sons of Muirchertach O Conchobair." At some point in the fighting Aedh seems to have lost, or ceded possession of, the Dún, because the Annals of Connacht states that "They were on the western bank of the Galway River and the Galls on the eastern." However, this does not seem to have been a decisive factor for de Burgh; as much as a week passed with "much fighting ... between them every day, and in this condition the Galls remained, obtaining neither pledge nor hostage nor submissions from the Connachtmen." Dissatisfied with the inconclusiveness of the conflict, de Burgh cut his losses and left in the direction of Cong "to pursue the cattle and folk which had fled into the mountains and recesses of the countryside and the sea-islands."

But as subsequent events would show, the strategic position of Dún Béal Gallimhe had made an impression upon de Burgh, and he would be back.

== De Burgh's siege of 1232 ==
In 1232 de Burgh returned in force and took Fedhlim O'Conor prisoner, replacing him by Hugh O'Conor. Having taken control of the castle de Burgh made a number of substantial additions to the building.

== O Conchobhair's siege of 1233 ==
When Hugh O'Conor died in 1233 Fedhlim O'Conor regained his freedom and retook the town and castle. He demolished the castle works of de Burgh.

== De Burgh's siege of 1235 ==
Richard de Burgh recovered the town again and made it into the capital of the province, dying there in 1271.

== O Donnell's siege of 1596 ==
During the Nine Years' War Hugh Ruadh O'Donnell, in league with other chieftains, attacked the county of Galway in 1596 and, after burning Athenry, marched to the town of Galway. There they asked for provisions but were refused, retaliating by setting fire to outlying houses on the edge of the town. O'Donnell's forces were then driven off by cannon fire and an armed sally by the defenders and retreated to Mayo.

== Lord Forbes's siege of 1642 ==
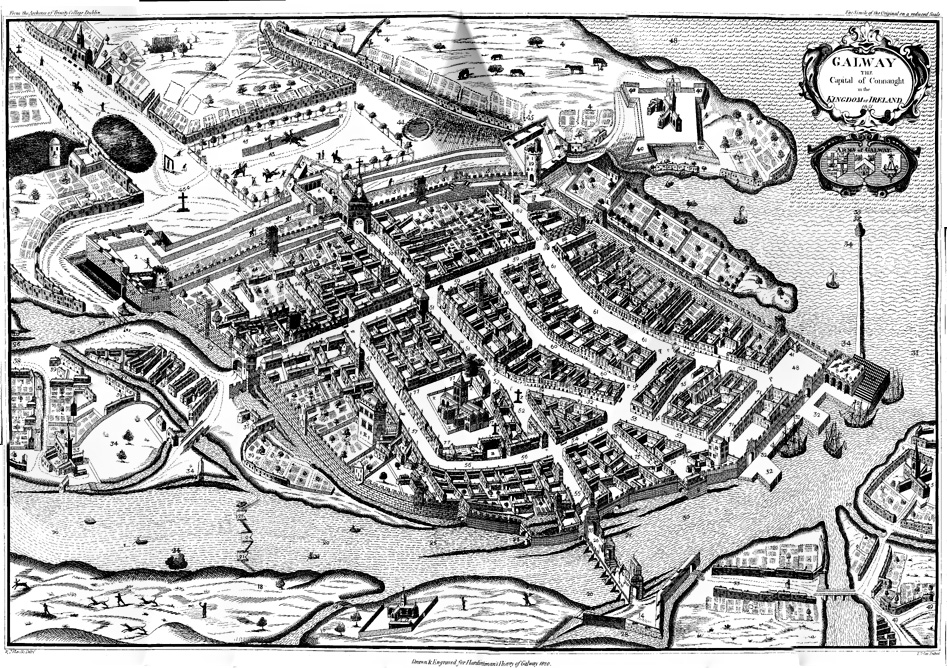
This map of 1651 shows the walled city, the River Corrib, Fort-Hill (the upper right hand corner), and the Claddagh (the lower right hand corner).

On the morning of 7 August 1642, to the "considerable agitation and suspense [of the] town", a naval squadron of seventeen ships appeared in Galway Bay. Led by Alexander, 11th Lord Forbes (died 1671), they had come to relieve the garrison of Forthill at the request of the English Parliament, and which had authorised him, as Lieutenant-General, to waste the coasts of Ireland. Launching long boats from the ship, Forthill was resupplied with food, arms and ammunition. Forbes then sent a messenger with a letter for Mayor Walter Lynch fitz James, ordering them to "confess themselves to have been rebels, and humbly submitting to beg his majesty's intercession for them to the parliament of England, and to declare they would admit such governors as the king and state should appoint, and until then put themselves under the protection of Lord Forbes."

Mayor Lynch and the town council utterly refused the terms, to the surprise and anger of Lord Forbes. They instead made representations to the Earl of Clanricarde - who was at the time a neutral - for protection. Clanricarde in turn communicated to Forbes that, should he make war against the town, it would be both a breach of the peace and endanger the country by bringing yet another area into the war. Furthermore, he made it clear that, should the citizens become actively hostile against Forbes, there would be nothing he could do to influence them.

According to James Hardiman " ... Forbes, stimulated by Willoughby and Ashley" - captains of the besieged Forthill - "and governed by the advice of Hugh Peters, whom he brought with him as his chaplain ... was entirely deaf to every remonstrance of reason or discretion." Being unable to directly assault the town itself, Forbes landed men west of the town and took possession of St. Mary's Church. All of the town's surrounding suburbs and villages were burned and destroyed; dozens of locals were killed, assaulted and raped. St. Mary's Church was badly defaced. Coffins in the St. Mary's graveyard were dug up and Lord Forbes's troops searched the bodies for rings, gold chains and the like.

Forbes placed "two pieces of ordnance", or cannons, at St. Mary's and used them to bombard the city. However, they had little effect and by early September Forbes's men were becoming irritated at both their lack of progress and lack of payment. On 4 September he cut his losses and sailed for Limerick. Forthill was once more under siege and on its own, Clanricarde's political stock had plummeted as he had been unable to prevent the sacking, and any waverers among the people of Galway were now solidly on the Irish Confederate side.

== Confederate siege of Fort-Hill 1642–1643 ==
The siege of Fort-Hill by the Confederates began immediately after the departure of Lord Forbes on 4 September 1642 and continued until the surrender of Captain Willoughby on 20 June 1643.

== Coote's siege 1651–1652 ==
The Parliamentary siege took place from August 1651 to May 1652 during the Cromwellian conquest of Ireland. Galway was the last city held by Irish Catholic forces in Ireland and its fall signalled the end to most organised resistance to the Parliamentarian conquest of the country.

== Ginkel's siege of 1691 ==
This short siege took place during the Williamite Wars. After his success at the nearby Battle of Aughrim on 12 July 1691 (O.S.) the Dutch Williamite General Godert de Ginkell in command of the English forces decided to capture the town of Galway before advancing on Limerick.

Galways's defences were depleted but food supplies were adequate and reinforcements had been promised. The town's Governor, Lord Dillon, and the military commander, Lieutenant-General D'Ussone, decided to hold out rather than surrender. On 20 July 1691 a column of 14,000 Williamite troops surrounded the town and occupied an outlying fort. Other troops cut off the route by which reinforcements would arrive. Under pressure from the townspeople the Governor surrendered and the treaty was signed the following day, under the terms of which the town would be surrendered on 26 July with free passage to anyone who wished to leave and free pardon to those who stayed.

The Governor and the garrison forces were escorted to Limerick and Sir Henry Belasyse appointed as the new Governor.

== General references ==
- Annála Connacht.
- Annals of the Four Masters.
- Clanricarde, Earl of (1757). Memoirs and Letters. London.
- Letter Book of the Earl of Clanricarde. Dublin. 1984.
- Mac Carthaigh's Book.
- O'Sullivan, Mary Josephine Donovan (1942). Old Galway: The History of a Norman Colony in Ireland. W. Heffer And Sons Limited.
