= Felim O'Connor =

Felim O'Connor may refer to the following individuals:

- Felim O'Connor (d. 1260), king of Connacht, Ireland, died 1260.
- Felim McHugh O'Connor, king of Connacht, Ireland, died 1316.
