= Fearghal Ó Taidg an Teaghlaigh =

Fearghal Ó Taidg an Teaghlaigh, Chief of the Name, Marshal and bodyguard of King Cathal Crobhdearg Ua Conchobair of Connacht and his successor, Aedh, died 1226.

== Background ==
Ó Taidg was a descendant of King Tadg mac Cathal of Connacht (reigned 925–956), and was thus distant related to the Ua Conchobair (O'Conor) ruling dynasty. His family were one of a number of septs of the Síol Muireadaigh, which included clans such as Geraghty (Mac Airechtaig), Moran, Flanagan, Mulrooney, and MacDermot.

Two early members of the family are listed in the Annals of the Four Masters sub anno 965 and 1048:

- 965: The battle of Formaeil, at Rath-beg, was gained by the Cinel-Eoghain over the Cinel-Conaill, where Maelisa Ua Canannain, lord of Cinel-Conaill, and Muircheartach Ua-Taidhg, royal heir to Connaught, were slain, together with many others.
- 1048: A predatory excursion was made by the royal heirs or chieftains of Ui Maine into Delbhna, where the royal chieftains were all slain, namely, Ua Maelruanaidh, Ua Flannagain, An Cleireach Ua Taidhg, and Mac Buadhachain, royal heir of Dealbhna Nuadhat.

The Ó Taidg family ruled an area in mid-County Galway, which was called Clann Taidg after them. It appears to have come into existence during a wave of expansion by the Uí Briúin in the middle decades of the 10th century. Previously part of Uí Briúin Seóla, the Ó Taidg's are believed to have become its lords sometime in the mid-12th century. By 1241 much of the area was seized by Meyler de Bermingham, who made Athenry the seat of his lordship.

== An Teaghlaigh ==
By the early 12th century the family added the suffix an Teaghlaigh to their surname. It derived from the fact that the family were household chiefs and bodyguards of the Kings of Connacht. The earliest record of the term occurred in 1132, when

The castle of Bun-Gaillmhe (Galway) was burned and demolished by a fleet of the men of Munster; and a great slaughter was made of the people of West Connaught, together with Ua Taidhg an Teaghlaigh, and many other noblemen.

== King Cathal ==
Fearghal's lord and king was Cathal Crobhdearg Ua Conchobair, who fought for the kingship of Connacht from the 1180s, succeeding in becoming undisputed king in 1202. As both his bodyguard and chief of his household – much like a royal Marshal such as John Marshal (c. 1105–1165) – Feargal would have been at Cathal's side for many years, especially when on campaign.

== The war of 1225 ==
Cathal died in 1224, and succeeded by his son Aedh who was almost immediately beset with problems. Donn Óge Mag Oireachtaigh had been deprived of his lands by Aedh, and now sought the help of Domnall Óg Ó Néill of Tír Eógain. In 1225 Ó Néill invaded and set up a new king. Only a few of the Síol Muiredaig namely, Mac Dermot, David O'Flynn, &. stayed loyal to Aedh.

Aedh then resolved to repair to the English to the Court of Athlone; for it happened, fortunately for him, that the chiefs of the English of Ireland were at that very time assembled there, and the greater part of them were friendly to him, on his father's account as well as on his own, for both had paid them wages for military services, and had been bountiful towards them. The English received him with joy, and kept him among them with much affection for some time afterwards. He then engaged in his cause the Lord Justice, and as many of the chiefs of the English of Ireland as he considered necessary, together with Donough Cairbreach O'Brien, and O'Melaghlin, with their forces.

In the warfare that followed engagements occurred all over Connacht, from Turlough in County Mayo to Meelick in County Galway. Coolcarney was plundered, after which some of its people fled to Duvconga, but the greater part of these were drowned; and the baskets of the fishing weirs were found full of drowned children.

== Restoration and the death of Niall ==
Aedh was eventually restored, but the price was giving to the English the chiefs of his people, as hostages for the payment of their wages, as Flaherty, O'Flanagan, Farrell O'Teige (i.e., Fearghal) and others of the chiefs of Connaught, who were subsequently obliged to ransom themselves.

No sooner had the English left than the sons of Ruaidri O Connor rose up in revolt again. In the subsequent Battle of Ardrahan Niall, the son of Farrell O'Teige, and others, were slain; but the man who slew Niall O'Teige, i.e. the brother of Colen O'Dempsey, was slain himself also.

Eventually, a truce was declared, of which the annals say

This was a necessary tranquillity, for there was not a church or territory in Connaught at that time that had not been plundered and desolated. An oppressive malady raged in the province of Connaught at this time: it was a heavy burning sickness, which left the large towns desolate, without a single survivor.

== Death ==
Despite this, warfare continued again next year. Fearghal was killed in County Sligo by Donslevy O'Gara, who had been forced to make peace with King Aedh the year before.

King Aedh was killed in 1228 and succeeded by his cousin, Aedh mac Ruaidri Ua Conchobair.

== Descendants ==
Of Fearghal's family there are few notices in the subsequent annals. A bald statement for 1251 state Muiredach O Taidc died.. In 1429 it was noted that Melaghlin, son of Conor Anabaidh O'Kelly, who was the son of the Lord of Hy-Many, was slain with one cast of a javelin, by John Cam O'Teige, one of O'Conor's people. After this, the family fade from history.

== Sources ==
- Early Irish Kingship and Succession, Bart Jaski, 2000. ISBN 1-85182-488-X
- Medieval Ireland: Territorial, Political and Economic Divisions, Paul MacCotter, Four Courts Press, 2008, pp. 134–135. ISBN 978-1-84682-098-4
