= Henry Butler, Lord of Umallia =

Henry Butler, Lord of Umallia, founder of Burrishoole, died 1272.

== Ancestry ==
Butler was a descendant of Theobald Walter, 1st Baron Butler, founder of the Butler dynasty of Ireland.

Theobald Butler, 4th Chief Butler of Ireland was a close relation. A later kinsman was James Butler, 1st Earl of Ormond.

== Founder of Burrishoole ==
Butler participated in the invasion of Connacht under either Richard Mór de Burgh, 1st Baron of Connaught or his son, Walter de Burgh, 1st Earl of Ulster. In 1238 his is referred to as lord of Umhall ("the Owles").

In 1272 he and Hosty ap Meurig were slain by Cathal, son of Conor Roe, and by the Clann-Murtough O'Conor. The latter Gaelic family, the Clan Muircheartaigh Uí Conchobhair, then tenants of Butler in Umhaill, had previously been lords over the territories, but their uprising led to their expulsion within two years. In 1281 a John Butler held the manor of Ballycroy in neighbouring Erris also formerly held by the Clan.

In 1333, another John Butler or le Botiller, son of a Peter, held Henry's estates. In 1380 his son Thomas, Lord of Achill and Owles, is attested in a transfer of land in Co. Cork. After this date the family disappears from history. In the late 1500s, however, the then Earl of Ormond obtained the rights to Henry's estates by unknown means.

== Annalistic reference ==
The Annals of the Four Masters state:

- 1272. Henry Butler, Lord of Umallia, and Hosty Merrick, were slain by Cathal, son of Conor Roe, and by the Clann-Murtough O'Conor.
