= Áed na nGall =

King of Connacht
- Reign: June 1265 – 3 May 1274
- Predecessor: Felim Ua Conchobair
- Successor: Eógan mac Ruaidri Ua Conchobair
- Born: Unknown; Connacht, Ireland
- Died: 3 May 1274; Connacht, Ireland
- Burial: Monastery of the Preaching Friars, Roscommon
- House: Ó Conchubhair Donn
- Father: Felim Ua Conchobair, King of Connacht

Áed mac Felidlimid Ua Conchobair (English: Hugh McFelim O'Connor), known as Áed na nGall (Áed of the foreigners/Hebrideans), was king of Connacht alongside his father Felim from 1258 reigning solely from 1265 until his own death in 1274. He is credited with turning the tide on Norman expansion in Connacht at the Battle of Áth an Chip. Aed took a different approach from his father when dealing with English crown authority in Ireland, placing his faith in alliances with the Gaelic speaking world and becoming the chief supporter of Brian Ua Neill's bid to revive the high kingship of Ireland. His byname na nGall (of the foreigners/Hebrideans) comes from his marriage in 1259 to a daughter of Dubhghall mac Ruaidri King of the Hebrides which brought him 160 gallowglass commanded by Dubhghall's younger brother Ailéan as a dowry.

== Early life ==
Aed's father Felim was king of Connacht from 1230. In 1249 a son of Felim, assumed to be Aed, is recorded ambushing a retinue of young Anglo-Norman nobles on their way to Sligo Castle, killing seven of them. They were being escorted by a member of the de Bermingham family of Athenry, and afterwards Aed raided their lands with his followers. One of his companions was captured by a member of the family called Geroitin, prompting Aed to pursue them until he managed to kill Georoitin and free his companion, who later died of his wounds. In response Maurice Fitzgerald 2nd Lord Offaly raised an army and marched into Connacht forcing Aed and his father Felim to gather their movable wealth and retreat into Breifne and the north of Ireland, while Maurice installed Toirrdelbach son of Aedh Ua Conchobair as king.

However Toirrdelbach's power was badly weakened when his warlike sons, against the advice of Toirrdelbach, initiated the First Battle of Athenry, and were badly defeated. The next year Felim marched into Connacht from Tir Eoghain at the head of an army, forcing Toirrdelbach to flee to his erstwhile allies for support. They instead made peace with Felim and re-recognized him as king. In 1253 the O'Reillys, increasingly independent of Connacht's traditional vassal state of Breifne, teamed up with Felim's rival Cathal O Conchobair who had been banished from the kingdom by him in 1250. They pillaged Muintir Eolias until Aed arrived and 'utterly routed them'. In 1255 Aed traveled north to Tir Eoghain and made peace with Connacht exiles who were hiding there out of fear of his father. They marched together back to Connacht while the descendants of Ruadhrí, rival claimants to the throne, and their Anglo-Norman allies watched but according to the annals dared not attack.

In 1256 civil war in the Kingdom of Breifne came to a head between the traditional O'Rourke (Ó Ruairc) kings and the O'Reillys (Ó Raghallaigh). Walter de Burgh 1st earl of Ulster raised an army and marched into Mayo and plundered the region, though he failed to meet up with his O'Reilly allies. Aed in alliance with Conchobar O'Ruairc king of Breifne raised his own army and met the forces of the O'Reillys at the Battle of Magh Slecht. O'Rourke's army was initially beaten back three times by the forces of O'Reilly until the army of Connacht came to the fore with Aed at their head and crushed them killing that day 'all their nobles'. Aed distinguished himself in the battle as the annals relate;

''They ranged themselves in a burning, blazing, active, fiery throng, a phalanx stout and stable, round Aed mac Fedlim, that strong sturdy prince, and on that day the high-king's son showed a ruler's fury, a champion's endurance, a lion's prowess. A fierce furious felling fight was joined then between the two hosts, many were killed and wounded on either side.''

He also flew into a berserker like rage so that;

''the witnesses of this great battle say that neither the warriors of these bands, nor the champions of the great victory, could gaze at the face of the arch-prince, for there were two broad-eyed, enormous, royal torches flaming and rolling in his head; and every one feared to address him at the time, for he was as far as the voice could reach before the hosts, advancing against the battalions of the Uí-Briuin. And he raised aloud his battle cry of a chief king, and his champion's shout, in the middle of the great battle, and desisted not from this career and onset until the battalion of the Uí-Briuin was routed.''

The O'Reillys dispersed and attempted to regroup some of their forces, but were pursued by the O'Rourkes who routed them in a follow-up skirmish and killed a further 36 men. The O'Reillys then sent further envoys to de Burgh asking him to waste Connacht so he and his armies plundered churches around Keshcorran but would not link up with the army of their allies for fear of giving battle to Aed. The two armies thus separated Aed decided to launch a surprise attack on the remaining O'Reilly force, travelling on foot with no armor and a small following to cross the east bank of the river Shannon again defeating the O'Reillys and taking many of their severed heads to present to his father. Soon afterwards a new justicar, Alan la Zouche, arrived from England. Aed meet with him independently of his father and was given guarantees by la Zouche that there would be no more diminishing of him or his father's territory while la Zouche held office. Before the end of the year the O'Rourkes made a separate peace with the Anglo-Normans, unacceptable to Aed and his father as they should have represented them as their overlords or at least given permission for such a truce. This led to a short period of conflict and raiding by Aed but by the start of 1257 peace was concluded between them.

As part of Breifne's submission to Aed he was given the stone castle at Cherry Island in Garadice Lough and garrisoned it with his troops. In 1257 he blinded his cousins and rivals Cathal Cuircech (the Hairy or Tufted) son of Aedh Ua Conchobair and a grandson of the same Aedh, Aed son of Conchobar in violation of his guarantees not to harm them. In the same year more conflict is recorded with the O'Rourkes, his castle on Cherry Island was raised though its garrison was allowed to march away unharmed. Aed in retaliation deposed Conchobar O'Ruairc king of Breifne replacing him with a man called Sitrecc, only for him to be soon afterwards killed by Conchobar's son Domnall. Later in the year he again raided the country, plundering the church at Fenagh while some of his followers also pillaged the lands of the MacShamradain (McGovern).

== King by the side of his father 1258-1265 ==
By 1258 Aed was ruling as king by the side of his father, this as Simm's has pointed out, meant Aed was for all practical purposes also a king. During this co-rule with his father he became the effective overlord of Breifne and pursued his own policies as a result. He captured Domnall son of Conchobar, held him as hostage but later released and installed him as king in Breifne. Its also in this year that he traveled, without his father, to Cáel Uisce with Tadhg O'Briain heir to Thomond and recognized Brian Ua Neill as High King of Ireland, handing over the hostages of Connacht to him to signal this. In return Brian ensured all the hostages of the O'Reillys and O'Rourkes were handed over to Aed, thereby recognizing his control of Breifne This doubled the size of the territory under Aed and Felim's control. Soon after Aed and the men of Breifne deposed Domnall, for he had outraged his subjects by killing the chieftain of Tellach Dunchada, and replaced him with Art mac Cathail Ua Ruairc. In 1259 Aed married a daughter of Dubhghall mac Ruaidri King of the Hebrides which brought him 160 gallowglass as a dowry. He imprisoned Art mac Cathail for an unknown reason and at a meeting arbitrated by Brian Ua Neill, made peace with the former king Domnall and allowed him to resume his kingship.

In 1260 Aed was present at the Battle of Down where Brian Ua Neill was defeated and killed by the English of Ulster. Aed managed to escape but de Burgh ravaged Roscommon in revenge, while Aed and his father raised an army in the north of the province, prompting de Burgh to make peace and withdraw. His sub king Domnall died in the same year and in 1261 Art mac Cathail escaped to Breifne, rallied a force together and burned one his strongholds defeating a raiding party of Aed's too. Aed decided to make peace with Art after this and even agreed to give his son in fosterage to him. The next year an army under de Burgh, the Justicar and John de Verdun laid waste to Roscommon. Felim sent his cattle herds north into Tir Chonaill while Aed traveled to the now unguarded lands of his enemies in Mayo and south Connacht burning towns and killing many. In response the army under de Burgh made peace with Felim and Aed and both Aed and de Burgh shared one room and one bed that night in a sign of their newfound good relations.

This was not to prove long lasting and the next year Aed again began raiding English territories, so de Burgh marched into Roscommon once more but failed to engage Aed's forces and left the land after suffering casualties from constant skirmishing attacks. At Athlone the following year more peace negotiations were held, with Aed and his father arriving with a large army as a show of strength, so that peace was quickly concluded between them the Justicar, the Earl of Ulster and the other chief Anglo-Norman lords.

== Sole king of Connacht 1265-1274 ==
In 1265 Aed's father Felim died and he assumed sole rule, launching a spectacular raid on the Fitzgeralds in Offaly and destroying several of their castles in north Connacht. He also blinded his kinsman and rival Cathal O'Conchobar who died from his wounds soon after. In 1266 he deposed Art O'Ruairc and installed Conchobar Buide in his place and took hostages from all the chieftains of Breifne. Aed's followers also slaughtered many Leinstermen and Welsh settlers in west Connacht bringing him 31 severed heads. In 1267 Aed's death was reported throughout Ireland after he came down with a serious illness and de Burgh raided his lands while he lay incapacitated. He had recovered by the next year and was summoned to Athlone by the Anglo-Normans but refusing to attend raised an army and defeated a force of them at the Battle of the Faes. In 1269 a trusted officer of Aed, Imar O'Birn is recorded retiring to a monastery while Aed again fell sick so that the new Justicar from England managed to erect a castle in Roscommon without opposition.

In 1270 Walter de Burgh and his ally the Justicar of Ireland raised a large army and marched into Roscommon where they encamped for two nights. They decided to cross to the east bank of the river Shannon and left a small force of the Justicar's men behind. Aed rallied his own army and sent a force to attack a party of the Earl's men in the forest of Conmaicne. The Anglo-Norman lords under de Burgh advised him to make peace with Aed so that Uilliam Oc son of Richard Mór de Burgh and some of his followers were sent to Aed's camp to negotiate but Aed instead simply took him prisoner and killed two of his followers. When Walter de Burgh learned of this he pulled back to Áth an Chip but Aed launched guerrilla attacks as their army marched, as the annals relate; ''for on these two nights O Conchobair (Aed) was ranging about them, as a fierce rending mighty lion prowls about his foes and slays them, so that he did not allow them to eat or rest.'' When de Burgh's forces did finally arrive the Battle of Áth an Chip began when Aed's forces fell upon de Burgh's army routing their vanguard and dislodging their rear. Toirrdelbach O Briain was slain single-handedly by the Earl but his army was defeated leaving behind many knights and soldiers dead on the field along with a great bounty of 100 horses. Uilliam Oc was killed in captivity afterwards in revenge for the slaying of Toirrdelbach and the castles of Ath Angaile, Sliab Luga and Kilcolman were razed with several towns such as Roscommon also burned.

Walter de Burgh died in Galway the next year and Aed demolished castles at Sligo, Templehouse and Athleague. In 1272 he destroyed Roscommon castle and plundered Meath as far as Granard before, like a pre-invasion high-king of Ireland, putting a fleet of ships on Lough Ree that spoiled the surrounding lands.

== Death and legacy ==
Aed died two years later on 3 May 1274. The Annals of Connacht give his death notice and a poem;

''Aed son of Fedlimid son of Cathal Crobderg O Conchobair, king of Connacht for nine years, died on the third day of May this year, a Thursday and the feast of the Invention of the Holy Cross; a king who wasted and desolated Connacht in fighting the Galls (Anglo-Normans) and Gaels (Irish) who opposed him; a king who inflicted great defeats on the Galls and pulled down their palaces and castles; a king who took the hostages of the Ui Briuin and the Cenel Conaill; the destroyer and healer of Ireland was he; the king most dreaded and triumphant of all the kings of Ireland in his day, as the poet says: ‘For nine years did this Aed Engach defend the Family of Tara—no feeble forrayer was he—against Gall and Gael.’''

There is no mention of Aedh's sons in the annals and he was succeeded by Eógan grandson of Aedh Ua Conchobair who reigned for just three months before he was killed by his cousin Ruadhri. He was in turn succeeded by Cathail Dall another grandson of Aedh Ua Conchobair who reigned just a fortnight before he too was killed, with a poet relating in the annals; ''‘Aed son of Cathal, fierce was his rule; he fought for the province of Connacht; after that, Crede's descendant was the spouse of Cruachu for a fortnight.’'' Yet another grandson of Aedh, Tadc son of Toirrdelbach then became king until his death in 1278 at the hands of the sons of the lord of Magh Luirg, after which Aed's bastard brother Aedh Muimnech became king.

Aed's lack of clear successor meant his kingdom was plunged into turmoil upon his death. Between 1274 and 1315 there were thirteen Kings of Connacht; nine of these kings were killed by a brother or cousin and two were deposed. The throne was a bone of contention for several factions and several outsiders where able to claim the kingship in this period of chaos. As a result, Aed's successors failed to build upon his achievements as king.

Preceded by Felim mac Cathal Crobderg Ua Conchobair	King of Connacht; 1265–1274	Succeeded by Eógan mac Ruaidri Ua Conchobair
