= Magnus O'Conor =

King of Connacht

Magnus McConnor Roe O'Conor (Irish: Maghnus mac Conchobair Ruadh Ua Conchobair) was king of Connacht in Ireland. He was a member of the Clan Murtagh O'Conor. He ousted his brother.

== Family ==
Maghnus had a daughter, Fionnghuala (d.1306). Before she was married, Fionnghuala had a poem dedicated to her by Tadhg Mór Ó hÚigínn, her father's tutor and a member of the famous O'Higgins poetic family. She then married Brian ‘Breaghach’ Mág Samhradháin, chief of the McGovern Clan of Tullyhaw, County Cavan, from 1272 to 3 May 1294. Their children were Giolla Íosa (d. 1322), Ferghal Ruadh (d.1322) and a daughter Gormlaidh who married Matha O’Reilly (d.1304). Fionnghuala died in 1306 according to the Annals of Ulster- Finnghuala, daughter of Maghnus Ua Concobuir, died. The Annals of the Four Masters give her death as 1310- Finola, daughter of Manus O'Conor, died. The Annals of Connacht 1310 state- Findguala daughter of Magnus O Conchobair rested in Christ. The Annals of Loch Cé 1310 state Finnghuala, daughter of Maghnus O'Conchobhair, quievit in Christo.

Preceded by Cathal mac Conchobair Ruadh Ua Conchobair	King of Connacht; 1288–1293	Succeeded by Aedh mac Eoghan Ua Conchobair
