= Felim McHugh O'Connor =

Felim McHugh O'Connor Feidhlimid Ó Conchobair
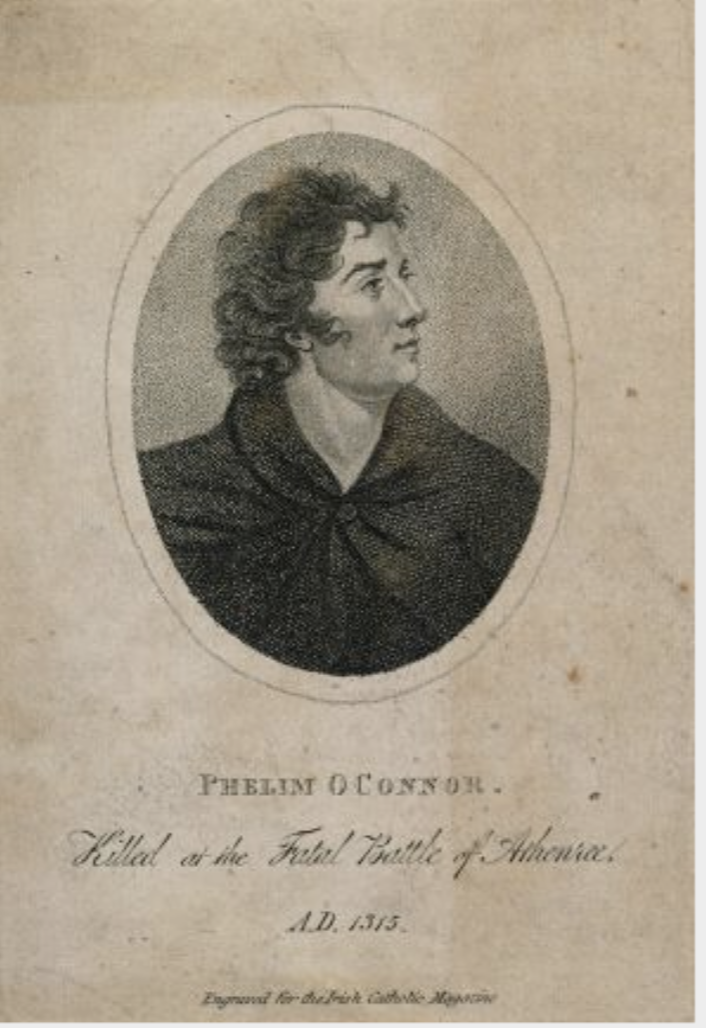
- 1808

King of Connacht
- Reign: 1310 – 10 August 1316
- Born: 1293; Connacht, Ireland
- Died: 10 August 1316 (aged 22–23); Athenry, Connacht, Ireland
- House: O'Connor Roe (Ó Conchubhair Ruadh)
- Father: Hugh McOwen O'Conor

Felim McHugh O'Connor (Irish: Feidhlimid mac Aedh Ó Conchobair, 1293–1316) was king of Connacht in Ireland from January 1310 to 10 August 1316. The beginning of his kingship saw a revival in the ancient form of inauguration performed for the Kings of Connacht after a period of apparent lapse in the practice. His reign took place against the background of a Gaelic recovery following the Anglo-Norman invasion and the disputed High Kingship of Edwurd Bruce. He was the last King of Connacht to truly hold power over the entire province and his death halted the gains that had been made following the Anglo Norman invasion, by his kingdom. His foster father Maelruanid Mac Diarmata King of Magh Lurg would play an instrumental role in his reign.

O'Connor was killed at the Second Battle of Athenry at the head of a massive Irish army thought to comprise at least two and a half thousand men, mainly from Connacht, with allies from Munster, Breifne, Mide and Ulster. A son, Aedh Ó Conchobair (Hugh O'Conor), would later become king of Connacht, as would his grandson, Toirdelbach Ó Conchobair (Turlough O'Conor).

== Life and Reign ==
His father, Aedh Ó Conchobair, was killed in battle at Coill an Clochain by Aed Breifnech Ua Conchobair. Afterwards the 'three tuatha', that is three sub kingdoms of Connacht, submitted to Aed Breifnach. However, Maelruanid Mac Diarmata King of Magh Luirg marched with Feidhlimid, his foster son, to Sil Murray with an army to ensure that any agreements Aed Breifnach made with the chieftains and sub kings of Connacht would not be ratified. Instead this show of strength by his foster father ensured Sil Murray and its chieftains submitted to Feidhlimid, and they allied themselves with William Burke of the Hiberno-Norman Burke dynasty. Aed Breifnach retaliated the next year in the 'Raid of the Burning' on Clogher killing many of Mac Diarmata's kin including women and children. Feidhlimid's problems with Aed Breifnach would come to an abrupt end soon after however when he was killed by a mercenary captain serving him named Seonac Mac Uidili in a plot organised by William Burke.

On news of his demise Burke and Mac Diarmata retaliated against those who had supported Aed with raids across Connacht. A rift however soon developed between the former allies with William Burke enforcing over lordship over Sil Murray by billeting his forces throughout the country. It was in response to this in 1310 that O'Connor was installed as king of Connacht with the backing of his foster father as explained by the Annals of Connacht,

''Maelruanaid Mac Diarmata, seeing the exclusion of his foster-son from his patrimony and the heavy exactions on each tuath about him, and much resenting the action of the Galls (Burke) in restricting and diminishing his power—for the Galls felt sure that if this one man were weak the whole province of Connacht would be in their own hands—determined, like the warrior he was, to take his foster-son boldly and make him king by force.''

In 1311 he made a raid on his rivals the Clan Murtagh O'Conor killing several. In 1315 O'Connor was marching in Richard Og de Burgh, the 2nd Earl of Ulster's army against Edwurd Bruce's forces in Ulster ravaging the land as they went. Edwurd Bruce then secretly sent messengers to O'Connor offering him all of the ancient kingdom of Connacht undivided if he would recognize Bruce as High King of Ireland and fight beside him, to which O'Connor agreed. It was at this time that Ruaidri (Rory) son of Cathal Ruad (Cathal Roe) O'Conor a rival claimant to Felim O'Connor also approached Bruce submitting to him and promising that he would drive the English from Connacht, which Bruce consented to provided Ruaidri refrained from attacking O'Connor. Ruaidhri however, having plundered many of the English possessions in Connacht had himself installed as king demanding Mac Diarmata recognize him, which was refused. O'Connor on hearing this hurried back to Connacht being attacked the whole way by allies of Ruaidri until his company was defeated somewhere in modern county Longford.

After this defeat O'Connor appears crestfallen dismissing the chieftains and sub kings who still followed him and advising they submit to Ruaidri rather than lose their positions with him. He returned to his former ally William Burke hoping for his support but Burke instead sought peace with Ruaidri in order to recover his lands in Connacht. He instead teamed up with some kinsmen who had been raiding against the Clan Murtagh O'Conor and his foster father Mac Diarmata killed Conchobar Ruad son of Aed Brefnech and carried great plunder back to O'Connor at Leyney. Soon after they were forced to flee when Ruaidri lead an army against them and had his ally Diarmait Gall Mac Diarmata installed as king of Magh Luirg in opposition to Feidhlimid's foster father. Looking for allies they submitted to the English of West Connacht and in the following year with their support they marched on Ruaidri and defeated him at the Battle of Tochar killing both him and Diarmait Gall, with Maelruanid Mac Diarmata being wounded in the fighting.

O'Connor afterwards recovered his kingship and turned on his former allies the English of West Connacht killing many knights, and rallying a large army consisting of his own forces from Connacht as well as armies from the Kingdoms of Thomond, Breifne and Meath to oppose William Burke and the other Galls (foreigners) of Connacht. They meet at the Second Battle of Athenry where the Irish forces were defeated and O'Connor killed, being at the time only twenty three and described in the Annals of Connacht as ''entitled to become King of Ireland''.

== Aftermath of Death ==
He was succeeded by Ruaidri na Fed son of Ruaidri O Conchobair, who was later deposed by Mac Diarmata after a reign of only a quarter of a year. Wiliam Burke followed up his victory by gaining submission of all the lords of Sil Muray, save Mac Diarmata who would be as active as ever in the kingship of Connacht until his death in 1322. None of O'Connor's descendants would be able to wield power comparable to that of O'Connor or his predecessors and the kingship of Connacht become a more symbolic title as the land and resources of the kings waned as their vassals power increased.

== Inauguration ==
The Annals of Connacht, in there entry for 1310 of O'Connor's inauguration, imply it was the first time in many years that the traditional rite of inauguration for a King of Connacht was carried out. The reason for this is believed to stem from the Norman invasion of Ireland and the political decline of the Irish kingdoms. Feidhlimid's inauguration, then, can be seen to be a symptom of the Gaelic recovery underway in the time of his reign and a throwback to times where his predecessors wielded power throughout the island of Ireland. The entry itself states:

''and he, Fedlimid mac Aeda meic Eogain, was proclaimed in a style as royal, as lordly and as public as any of his race from the time of Brian son of Eochu Muigmedoin till that day. And when Fedlimid mac Aeda meic Eogain had married the Province of Connacht his foster-father waited upon him during the night in the manner remembered by the old men and recorded in the old books; and this was the most splendid kingship-marriage ever celebrated in Connacht down to that day.''

The wording hear clearly implies a symbolic marriage between O'Connor and the kingdom of Connacht. This can be seen as tying into the concept of sacral kingship for the early Irish period and the idea of the sovereignty goddess with the land as a woman whom, when the rightful King marries her, brings fertility and bounty. However the fact that the annalist also mentions the old 'remembered' nature of the ceremony could imply this was how O'Connor and his contemporaries saw the ceremony in 1310, rather than it being outright evidence of the kings inauguration as a sacred marriage between him and the land being the Irish norm. The throwback nature of the inauguration implies O'Connor and his supporters were hearkening back to the past for legitimacy with this inauguration after the long lapse in the kingship prior to his accession.

Preceded by Ruaidri mac Cathal Ua Conchobair	King of Connacht; 1310–1316	Succeeded by Rory na-bhFeadh mac Donough Ua Conchobair
