= Ruaidri mac Cathal Ua Conchobair =

Ruaidri mac Cathal Ua Conchobair was King of Connacht in Ireland.

Preceded by Aedh mac Eoghan Ua Conchobair	King of Connacht; 1309–1310	Succeeded by Felim mac Aedh Ua Conchobair
