= Hugh McOwen O'Conor =

King of Connacht

Hugh McOwen O'Conor (Irish: Aedh mac Eoghan Ó Conchobair) was king of Connacht in late medieval Ireland. He is the person addressed in the poem Cóir Connacht ar chath Laighean and in the poem An tu aris a raith Theamhrach by Aonghus Ruadh Ó Dálaigh.

Aedh Ó Conchobair was the son of Eoghan mac Ruaidri Ó Conchobair. In 1288 Magnus O'Conor, son of Conchobair Ruadh mac Muirchertaig Ó Conchobair, deposed his brother, Cathal O'Conor as king of Connacht. Upon the death of Magnus in 1293, Cathal briefly reclaimed the kingship, but some months later was killed. Aedh then became king.

In 1293 John FitzThomas FitzGerald, 4th Lord of Offaly built a castle at Sligo. The next year, it was levelled by O'Conchobair. In 1309 O' Conchobair was killed by Aedh Breifnech, of the Clan Murtagh O'Conor, who held the kingship for one year.

== Sources ==
- Annals of Ulster at at University College Cork
- Annals of the Four Masters at at University College Cork
- Chronicum Scotorum at at University College Cork
- Byrne, Francis John (2001), Irish Kings and High-Kings, Dublin: Four Courts Press, ISBN 978-1-85182-196-9
- Gaelic and Gaelised Ireland, Kenneth Nicols, 1972.
- The Second Battle of Athenry, Adrian James Martyn, East Galway News & Views, 2008–2009

Preceded by Maghnus mac Conchobair Ruadh Ua Conchobair	King of Connacht; 1293–1309	Succeeded by Ruaidri mac Cathal Ua Conchobair
