= Clan Murtagh O'Conor =

Descendants of Tairrdelbach Ua Conchobair

The Clan Murtagh O'Conor (Irish: Clan Muircheartaigh Uí Conchobhair) were descendants of Irish High-King Toirdelbach Ua Conchobair, through his son, Murtogh Moynagh O'Conor (died 1210), tánaiste of Connacht. They have been defined by Katherine Simms as:

"... the earliest, most aristocratic and best documented example of increasing nomadism in the northern half of Ireland in the late middle ages. ... In spite of the fact that they were a very numerous branch of the O'Conor family, who supplied five kings to the throne of Connacht, they seem to have vanished away in the early fifteenth century, never to be heard of again."

== Clan Murtagh kings of Connacht ==
- Cathal McConnor Roe O'Conor, reigned 1280–1288
- Magnus McConnor Roe O'Conor, reigned 1288–1293
- Hugh Breifnech O'Conor (i.e., of Breifne), reigned 1309–1310
- Rory O'Connor, reigned 1315–1316
- Hugh McHugh Breifne O'Conor, reigned 1342–1343, died 1350

== Short history ==
The family held a position of overlordship in south Mayo prior to the Norman occupation of Connacht by Richard Mór de Burgh. Their area of control was likely conterminous with the Diocese of Mayo recognised at the Synod of Kells in 1152, but which had not existed in 1111. After the Norman take-over in 1235, a section came to an accommodation with the Butler dynasty in Umhaill and then Erris, part of their former overlordship, until finally being expelled in 1274 following the killing of Henry Butler, Lord of Umallia. Others moved east to the King's Cantreds in the 1240s and cooperated with resistance to further Norman conquest. They supported Áed na nGall in kings' sons formations of horse-borne raiding parties. They attempted thereafter with short periods of success to contest for the title of the rump-Kingdom of Connacht with their cousins, the descendants of Cathal Crobhdearg Ua Conchobair. Increasingly excluded from power after the reign of Magnus O'Conor, they left Machaire Connacht and by the 1290s their main base of activity was in Breifne O'Rourke where they developed formations of landless nomadic creaghts following their cattle-herds. A creaght was a grouping of families that in one body followed a herd, depending on it for their pastoralist existence. After the 1360s their standing was greatly reduced as former allies and enemies combined against their disruptive presence in Fermanagh and both East and West Breifne. They then removed to County Roscommon as supporters of the O'Conor Roe, gradually fading into obscurity.

The last annal entry concerning them comes from the Annals of Connacht, 1474, when:

Donnchad son of Muirchertach son of Aed O Conchobair of the remnant of the Clann Muirchertaig [i.e. d'iarsma Clainni Murcertuig] died at Toberelva in Mag nAi.

== Family tree (simplified) ==
- Kg. = King of Connacht

                        Tairrdelbach, King of Connacht & Ard Rí na hÉireann, 1088–1156.
                                  |
    ______________________________|____________________________________________
   |                              |                                           |
   |                              |                                           |
   Ruaidrí			Muirchertach Muimnech	       Cathal Crobhdearg, 1153–1224,
 c.1115-1198  	      		Tainiste of Connacht		      Kg. 1202–1224
 King of Connacht,              died 1210                       Ancestor of Ó Conchubhair Ruadh & Ó Conchubhair Donn          			
 & Ard Rí na hÉireann    	   |                      	
    	   	                   |
				Conor Ruad, died 1245
    ______________________________|____________________________________________
    |                                                                         |
    |                                                                         |
    Cathal Ruad							           Maghnus
    Kg. Conn. 1280–88; 1293                                              Kg. Conn 1288–1293
    |
    |________________________________________________________
    |                               |                       |
    |                               |                       |
    Conor Ruad  		 Aodh Breifnech   	  Ruaidri
    claimant. 1296	         Kg. Conn. 1309-10	  Kg. Conn. 1315–16                      	
    				    |
        ____________________________|_____________________
        |                          |                     |
      Aodh	                Cathal                 Ruaidri
   Kg. Conn. 1342-43            Tainiste              Tainiste
    died 1350                   died 1366             died 1380
