= Roscommon Abbey =

Ruined Dominican abbey in Roscommon, Ireland

- Mainistir Ros Comáin
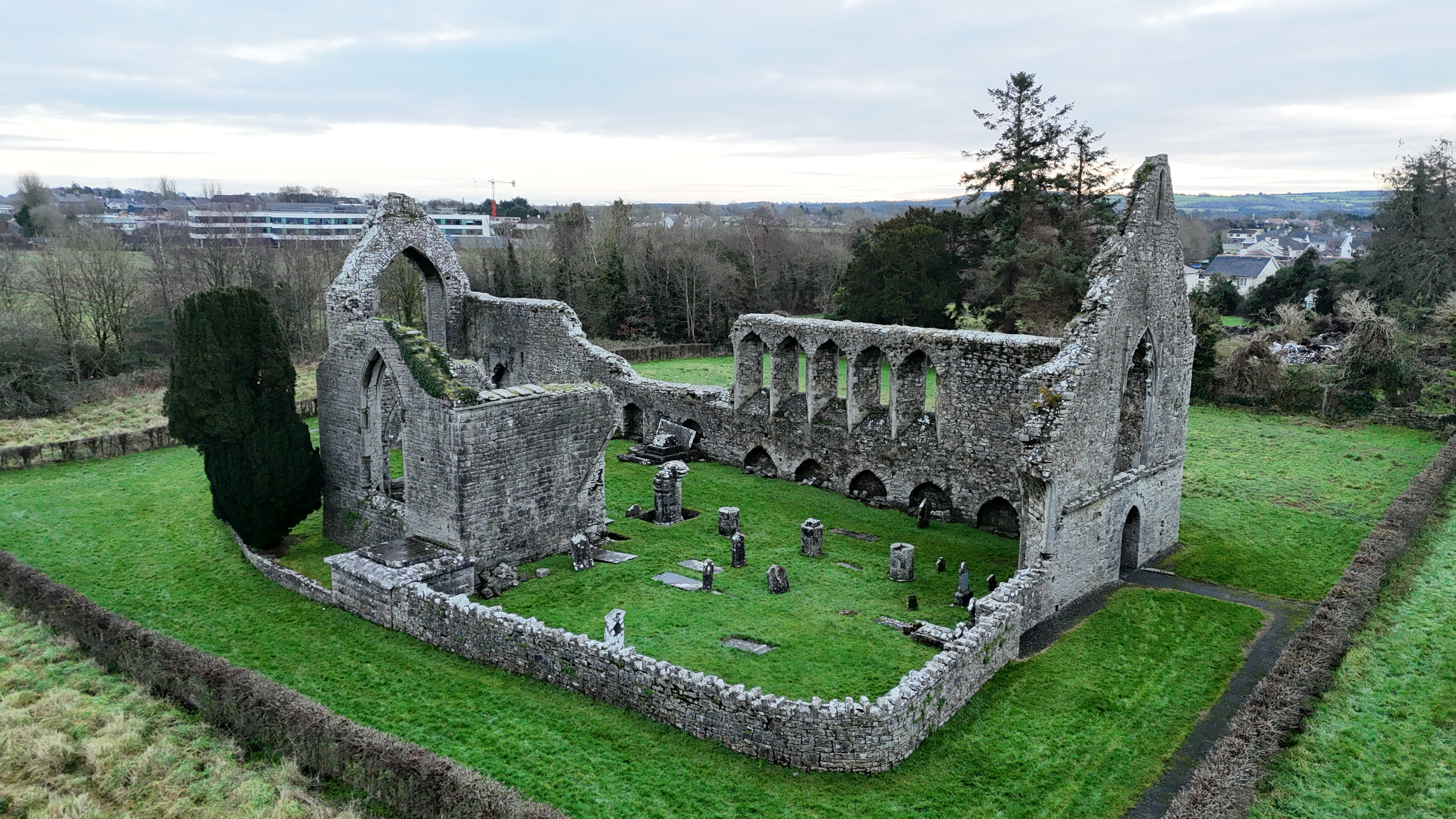
- Roscommon Abbey in 2024

- Location within Ireland
- Interactive map of Roscommon Abbey

Monastery information
- Other names: Ros-comain; Ros-chomon; Ros-camain; Ros-coman
- Order: Canons Regular of Saint Augustine/Dominicans
- Established: 1140
- Disestablished: 1578
- Diocese: Elphin

Architecture
- Status: ruined
- Style: Norman

Site
- Location: Ballypheasan, Roscommon, County Roscommon
- Coordinates: 53°37′29″N 8°11′30″W
- Public access: yes

Roscommon Abbey is a former Dominican Priory and National Monument located in Roscommon, Ireland.

== History ==
Roscommon Abbey was a Dominican priory founded in 1253 by Fedlim Ó Conchobair, king of Connacht. It was plundered by Mac William de Burgo 1260. It was hit by fire in 1270 and lightning in 1308.

Roscommon Abbey was dissolved before 1578; granted to Sir Nicholas Malby in 1578 and to Francis Annesley, 1st Viscount Valentia in 1615.

== Building ==
Roscommon Friary is located in the southern part of Roscommon town, The church consisted of a single long aisle with nave and choir; the northern transept was added in the fifteenth century.

On his death in 1265 Fedlim Ó Conchobair was interred in the abbey and his tomb was covered by an effigial slab which can still be seen in a niche in the north-east corner of the church. The effigy was carved between 1290 and 1300 and is one of only two Irish royal effigies surviving from this period.

=== Gallery ===
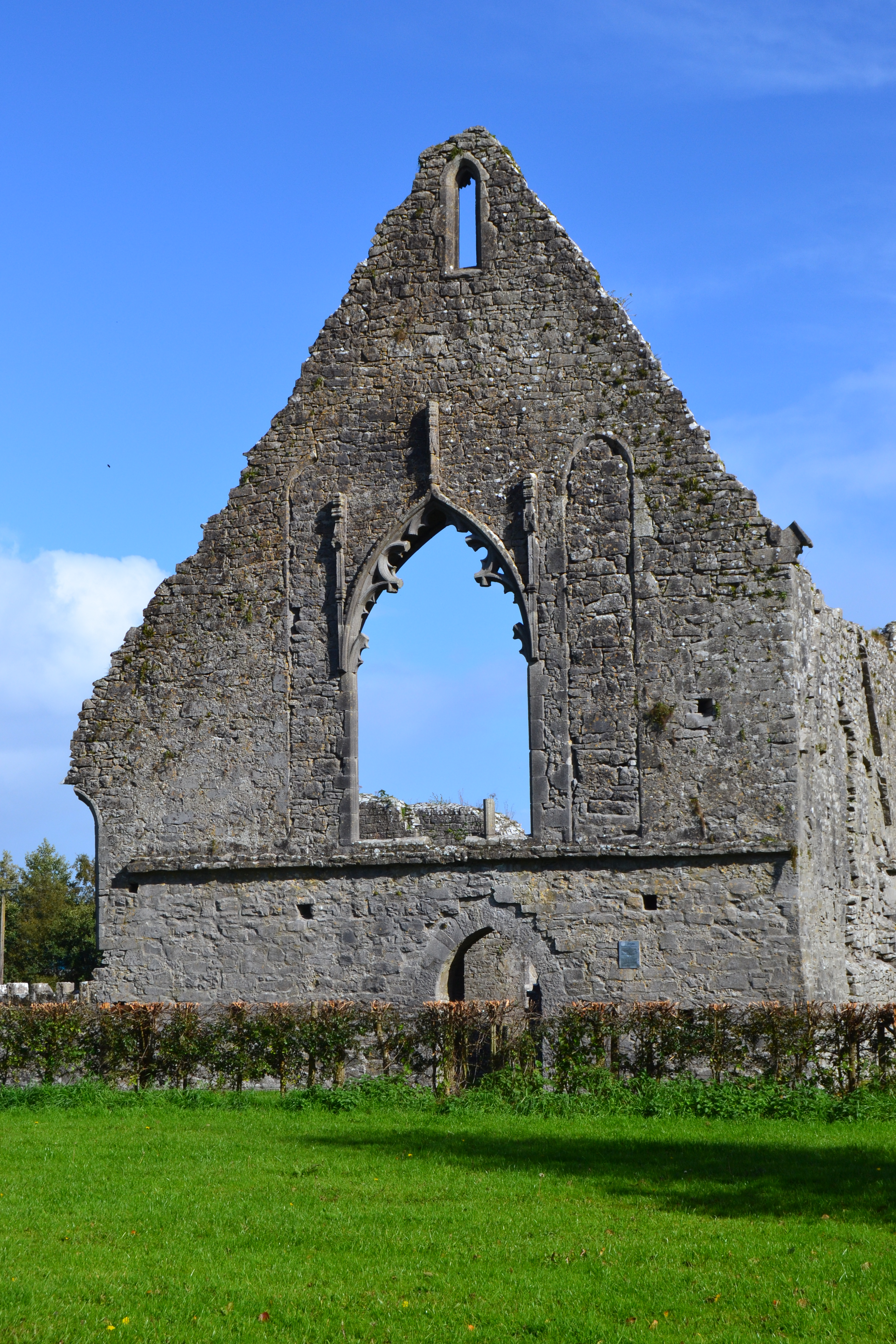
Great east window

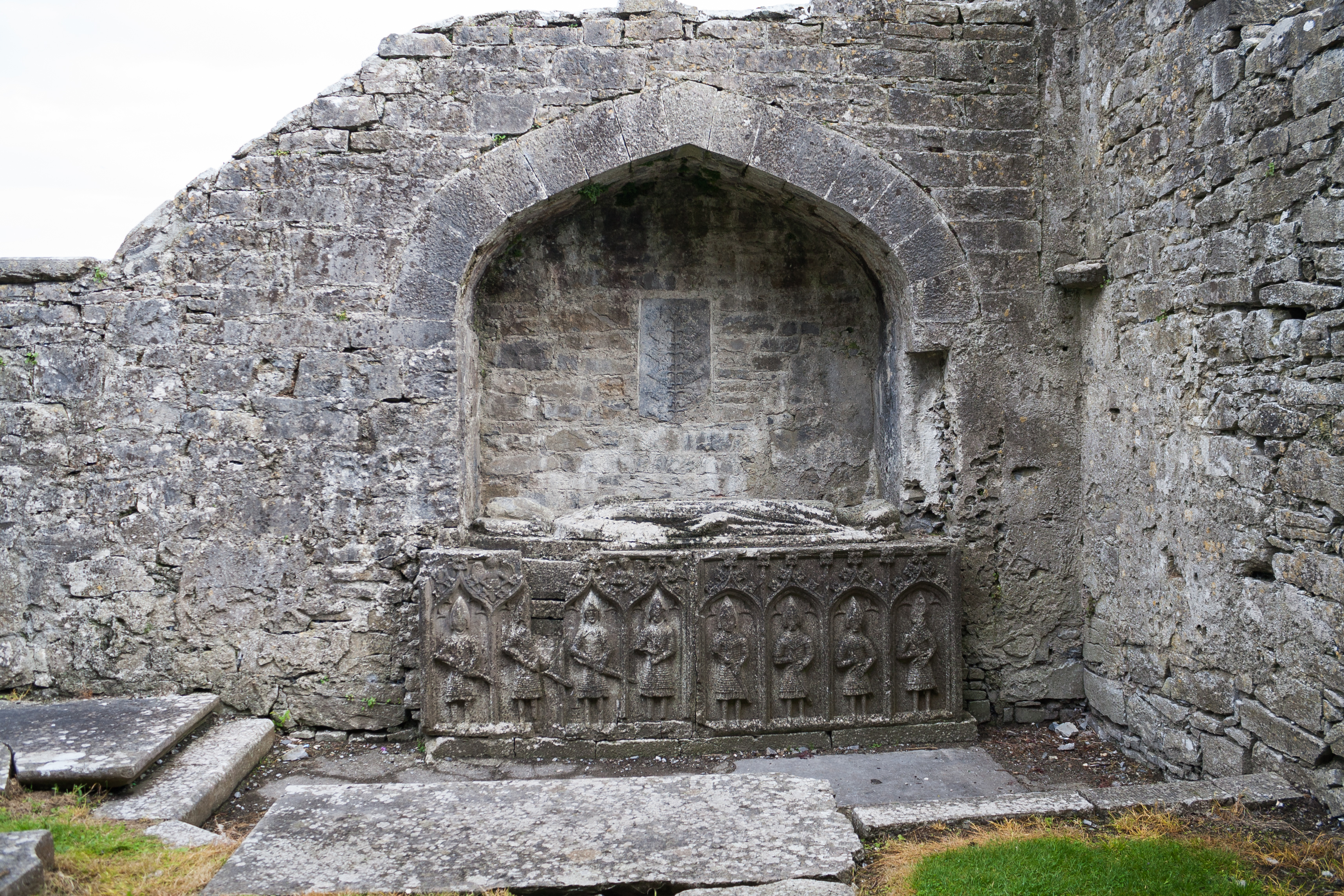
Choir tomb

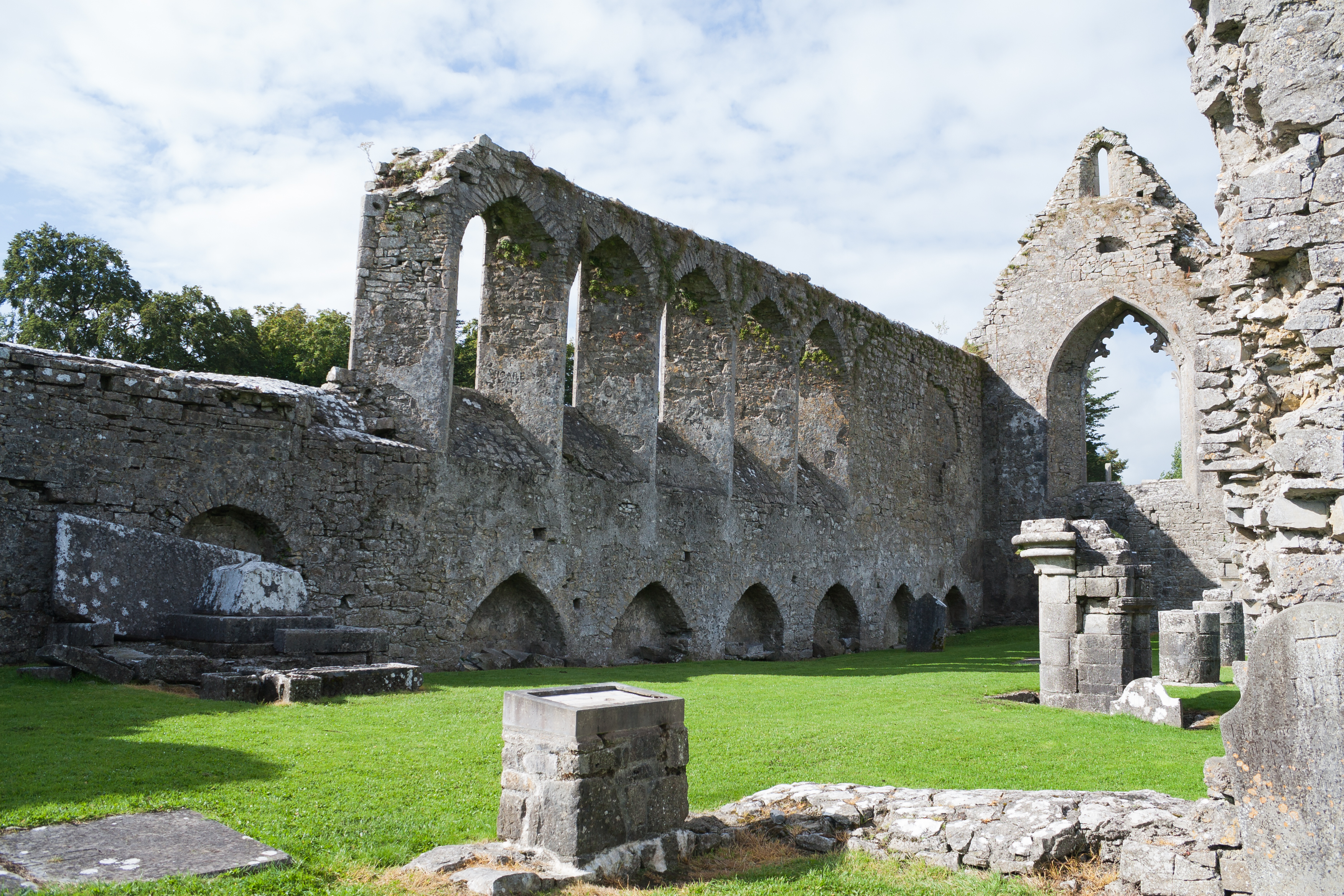
Nave seen from transept

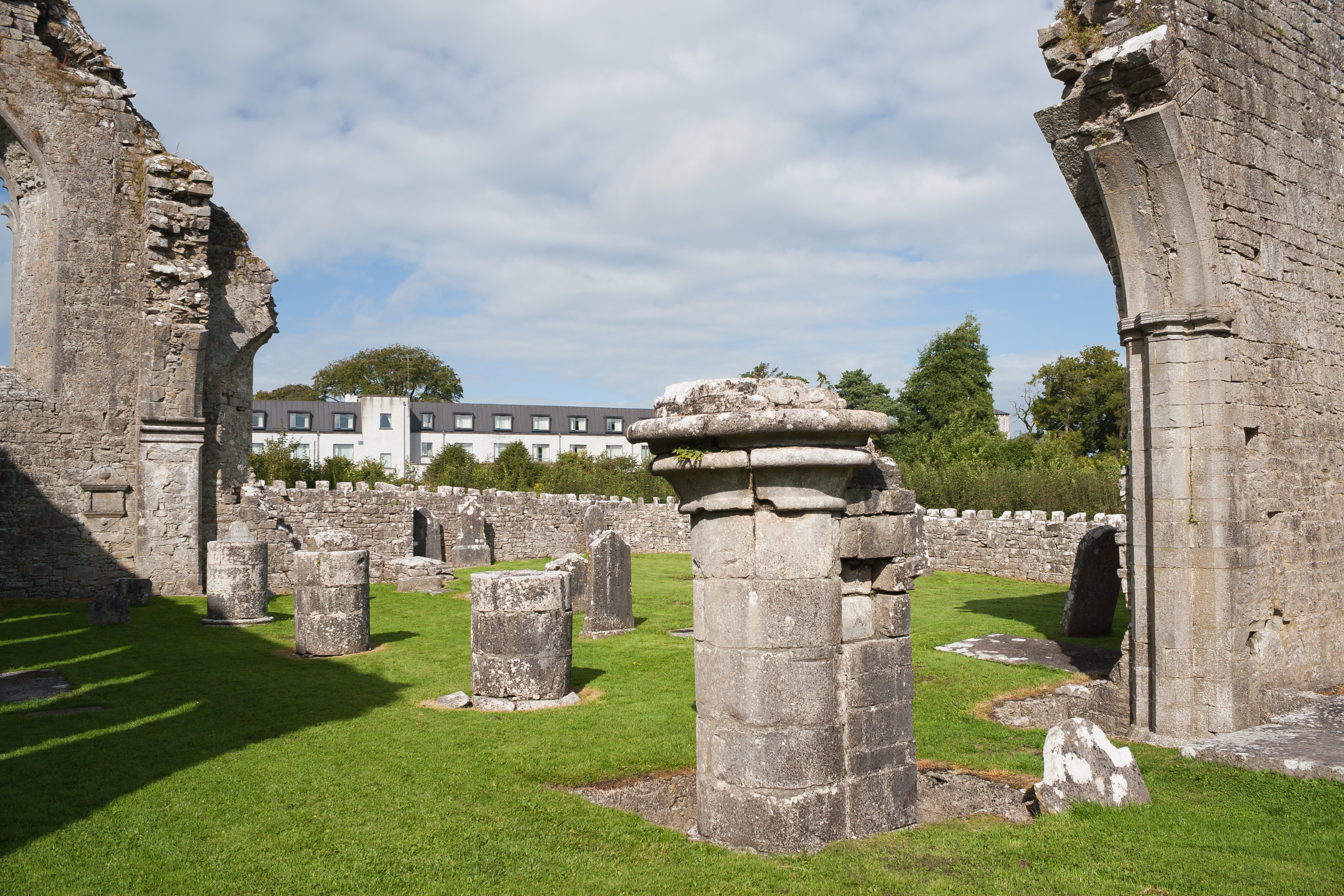
North aisle

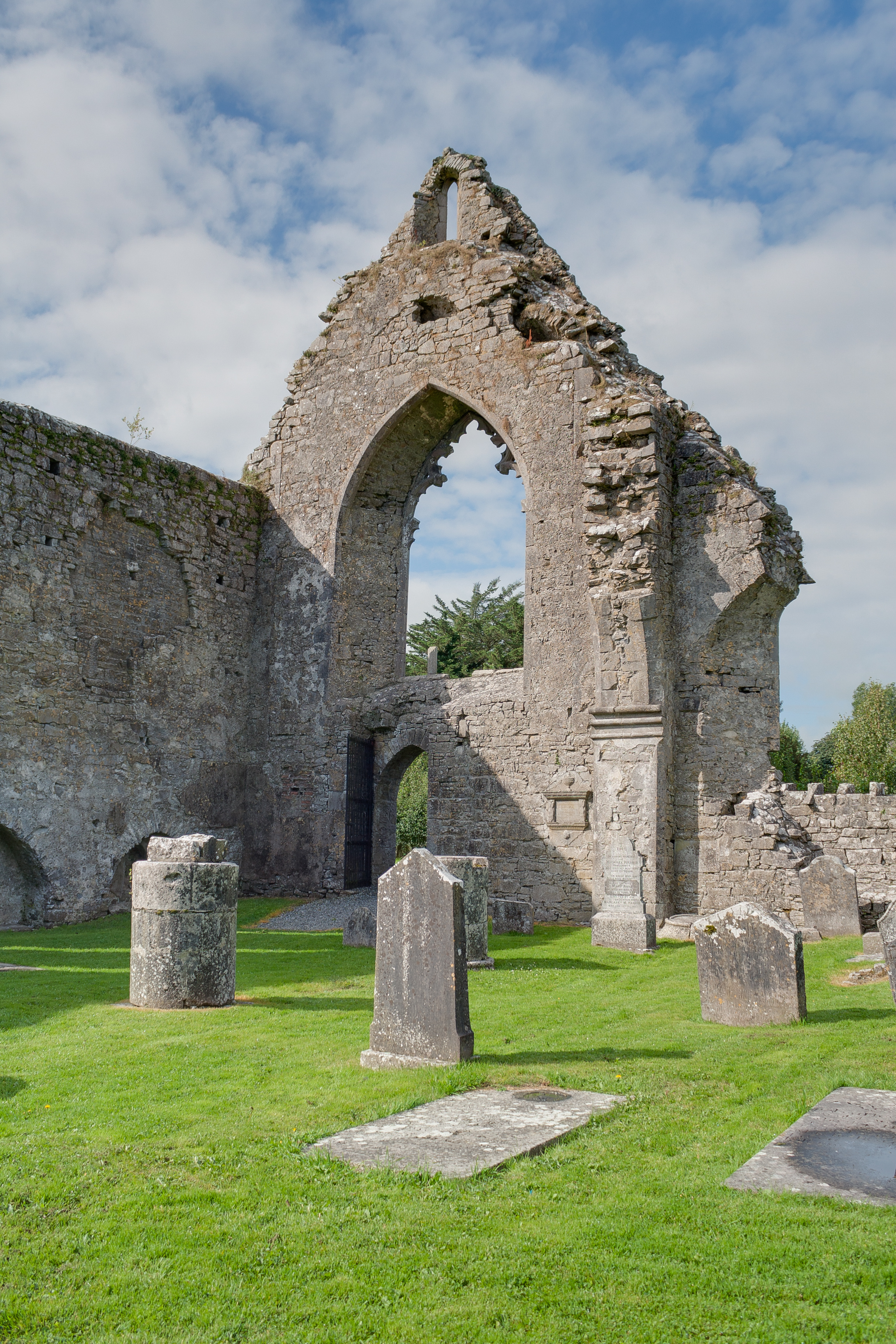
West gable
