= Muirgheas Ua hEidhin =

Muirgheas Ua hEidhin (died 1180) was King of Uí Fiachrach Aidhne.

Preceded by Gilla Cheallaigh Ua hEidhin	King of Uí Fiachrach Aidhne; 1153–1180	Succeeded by Owen Ó hEidhin
