= Felim O'Connor (d. 1265) =

Felim Ua Conchobair
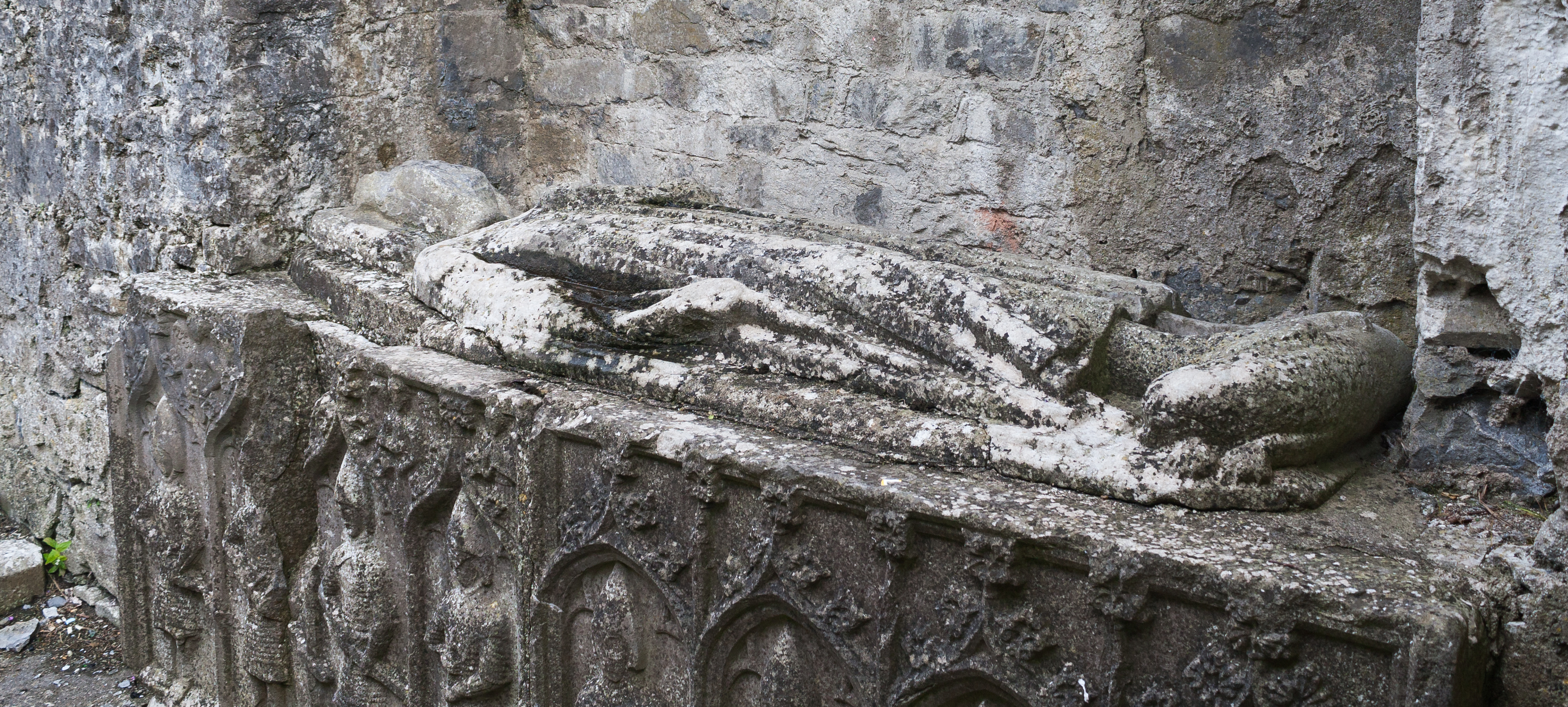
- 13th-century effigy of a tomb in the Dominican Priory of St. Mary in Roscommon that supposedly depicts Felim Ua Conchobair who founded the priory in 1253.

King of Connacht
- Reign: 1233-1265
- Predecessor: Aedh mac Ruaidri Ó Conchobair
- Successor: Aedh mac Felim Ó Conchobair
- Born: Unknown; Connacht, Ireland
- Died: Early 1265; Connacht, Ireland
- Burial: Tulsk Abbey, County Roscommon
- Consort: Identity Unknown
- Issue: Aedh na nGall; Aedh Muimnech; Fionnuala Ni Conchobair
- House: Ó Conchubhair Donn
- Father: Cathal, King of Connacht

Felim O'Connor (Irish: Feidlim Ua Conchobair) was king of Connacht in Ireland, having been proclaimed king by Richard Mór de Burgh in 1230, he reigned proper from 1233 until 1265. Felim died in that year and was buried in the Dominican Priory (present-day Roscommon Abbey) in Roscommon which he founded in 1253. On his accession Felim inherited many problems from his predecessors, having his territory limited to essentially County Roscommon and having to deal with an increase of English and Welsh settlers in the kingdom. Felim attempted to maintain both a loyal and personal relationship with Henry III King of England, hoping he would limit the influence of de Burgh and other powerful Anglo-Norman magnates in Connacht, but this policy of appeasement produced few concrete results. During Felim's reign the lands of the Ua Conchobair became limited to the five 'royal cantreds', essentially County Roscommon. Felim notably adopted aspects of Anglo-Norman culture as seen in his English style effigy and seal.

He was succeeded by his eldest son Hugh McFelim O'Connor, who adopted a more militant stance against English authority in Ireland than his father. Among his other offspring were Aed Muimhnech O Conchobair king from 1274 to 1280, and a daughter, Fionnuala Ní Conchobair who died in 1301 as abbess of Kilcreevanty, Clonfert. Having married while his brother Aedh Ua Conchobair was designated heir, he more than likely married someone of non-noble birth and thus her name does not appear in the annals.

== Life and Reign ==
Since the late 12th century there had been an intensification of Anglo-Norman power and presence in Connacht, exemplified by the leading role the de Burgh family played in the making of the kings of Connacht since the reign of Felim's father Cathal Crobhdearg. As a result, the power the kings of Connacht were able to wield had been reduced considerably and most now relied on the de Burgh's backing to claim the kingship as Felim would do in 1230. In that year Richard Mór de Burgh lead a hosting into the province forcing its then king Aedh mac Ruaidri Ó Conchobair into exile in Tir Eoghain, and bestowing the kingship on Felim. The annals of Ulster make no mention of Felim at all and the wording of both the annals of Loch Ce and Connacht imply Felim was gifted the kingship as a subordinate to Richard. In fact in contrast to both his predecessors and successors there is never a mention of Felim being inaugurated as king at Carnfree in the traditional manner and it may be he never underwent this ceremonial inauguration at all.

In 1231 for unknown reasons William imprisoned Felim at Meelick despite the guarantees of what the annals call the 'principal foreigners of Ireland' (Anglo-Normans). In the following year William made peace with the exiled Aedh, who resumed his kingship, and afterwards released Felim who went on to make a grant of Kilmore to the Augustinian cleric Cond Craidbheach O Flannacain. In the following year Felim received the backing of Cormac King of Magh Luirg the chief Irish vassal of Connacht. They attacked and killed Aedh plus many of his kin before razing numerous castles built by de Burgh in a sign of Independence from his overlordship. It is in this year that Felim truly assumed government of the Kingdom of Connacht. The next year in response to de Lacy encroachment on Felim's over lordship of Breifne he sacked several towns.

In 1235 Richard led a large Anglo-Norman army consisting of forces of Maurice FitzGerald Justicar of Ireland, Hugh de Lacy Earl of Ulster, the Anglo-Normans of Leinster as well as Munster into Felim's heartland of Roscommon ravaging the land to force his submission. Felim shadowed this army as they proceeded to Thomond in order to gain revenge and aid his ally Donnchadh Cairbreach O Briain. This led to a great battle between the forces of the Anglo-Norman lords on one side and the forces of the kingdoms of Connacht and Thomond on the other. The forces of the Irish kings were overwhelmed by the heavily armored infantry and cavalry of the Anglo-Normans but Felim managed to execute a fighting retreat, sustaining few casualties as compared to his ally Donnchadh whose army was decimated and himself forced to sue for peace. Felim returned to Connacht gathered all his movable wealth and followers and engaged in scorched earth tactics while retreating further north to seek refuge in the Kingdom of Tir Chonaill. The forces of Richard laid waste to Connacht and raided into Tir Chonaill but later in the year Felim made peace with Maurice the Justicar, promising to pay rent as vassal for the kings five cantreds, and would go on to raise Meelick castle where he had previously been imprisoned probably with Maurice's approval.

By 1236 this tenuous peace broke down and Felim again sought refuge in Tir Chonaill while Maurice installed Brian son of Toirdhealbhach Ó Conchobhair as ruler of the Irish in Connacht. De Burgh, who had been in England, rose on behalf of Felim and he was invited from exile by the chiefs O'Floinn, O'Cellaigh and the sons of Aedh Ua Conchobair to regain his rule. This army Felim was able to muster initially consisted of four battalions but when they came across unguarded cow herds simply abandoned the king for this plunder while he tried in vain to rally them, as the Annals of Connacht relate;

Like fierce furious forceful foemen they crossed the bawn and the moat of the island, where were all the cows of the territory, and then each captain of a company and each leader of an army made for the cows, and they were driving them off wherever they came upon them. A pitiful act, their lord, their honour and their valour were abandoned for booty and cattle which profited them nought, and they deserted their lord until out of the four battalions which had been under him he had but four single horsemen left, and the High-king's voice was broken in trying to recall and rally them.

Brian saw this disorganization in Felim's now scattered force and pursued and slayed many. Despite this embarrassing setback, at the Battle of Cluain Catha later that year Felim defeated an army of Brian's kinsmen and killed the son of his previous ally Cormac King of Magh Luirg, who had submitted to Brian. In 1237 Felim raised an army in Breifne and engaged Brian in battle at an unknown location. Brian's army consisted heavily of the justicar's troops, possibly as mercenaries, who were routed soon after the start of the battle when Felim ordered an immediate headlong charge at their lines that took them by surprise. Brian fled the field and Felim imposed his authority on Connacht, putting a fleet on Loch Ce and deposing Cormac King of Magh Luirg. After this show of strength Maurice made peace and renounced his right to tribute from the king.

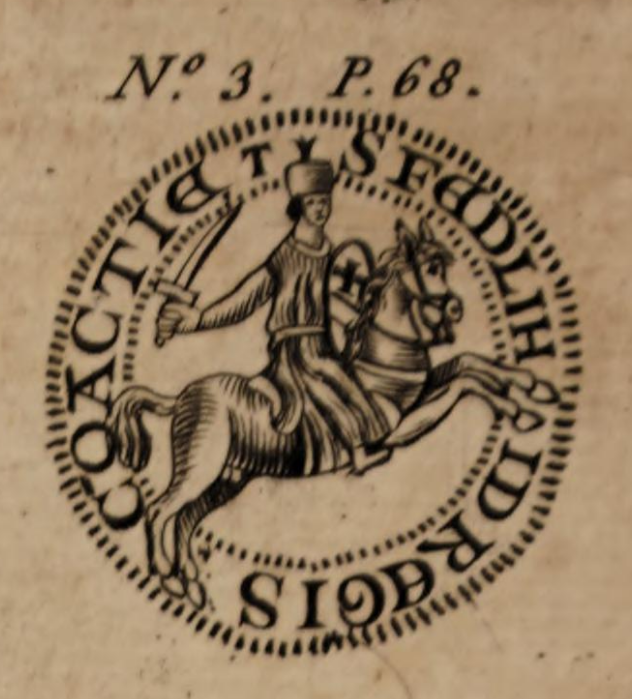
Seal of Felim King of Connacht as attached to his letters to Henry III

In 1240 Felim made an unprecedented move for a reigning Gaelic Irish king and traveled to the court of Henry III where he was received, according to the Annals of Ulster, with great honor. While there he complained of both Henry's English subjects and various Gaelic Irish lords harassing his position, returning home content with the meeting and the discussions between himself and Henry. In 1245 he was ordered by Maurice to construct Sligo Castle at his own expense showing clearly he was once more in a subordinate position to the Lord of Offaly. He also traveled to Wales in the same year with a contingent of perhaps 3000 infantry to serve Henry III in his campaign against Dafydd ap Llywelen Prince of Gwynedd and was again pleased with his reception by the English king. In 1248 he conferred Rathnarovanagh to the canons of Kilmore in the presence of notable Connacht nobles, the same religious group he had sponsored in 1232.

By 1249 Felim's son Hugh began to take an increasingly independent and militant line, coming into conflict with Maurice forcing Felim to gather his wealth and flee to Breifne in order to avoid Maurice's army. In his absence Maurice again installed another pretender, Toirdhelbach son of Aedh Ua Conchobair over Connacht. This wouldn't last long however and the next year with the aid of the King of Tir Eoghain Felim defeated Toirdhelbach and made peace with Maurice who again recognized Felim. Five years later Felim dispatched further envoys to Henry III for unknown reasons perhaps relating to his position with Breifne which would lead to conflict with de Burgh by 1256. The conflict seemed to relate to the territory of Muintir Raigillig lying within the kingdom of Breifne which was becoming increasingly independent with backing from the Anglo-Normans. Its status led to Felim and his son making war in alliance with the King of Breifne, their traditional vassal, against the Muintir Raigillig heavily defeating them. They made peace with de Burgh in 1257 and Felim received a charter confirming his rights in Roscommon from Henry III. By now Felim's son seems to be ruling if not as superior then as equal partner with his father and acts as effective overlord of Breifne. Aed traveled himself in 1258, without his father, to recognize Brian Ua Neill as High King of Ireland and installed Conchobar O Ruairc as a client king in Breifne. He was also present at the Battle of Down the next year where Brian was killed fighting the English of Ulster after which Aed's over lordship of Breifne came to an end temporarily.

Further conflict is recorded between Aed and the English in 1263 and de Burgh lead an unsuccessful expedition into Connacht taking heavy losses. In 1264 at Athlone de Burgh, Maurice and the Earl of Ulster decided to make peace with Felim and Aed after the two showed up to the negotiations with a large army as a show of strength. In the following year Felim died and was succeeded immediately by his son Aed who engaged in a more militant reign than his father. Felim's death obit as given by the Annals of the Four Masters extols his virtues and alludes to both his private and public obligations as a Gaelic Irish king.

''Felim, son of Cathal Crovderg O'Conor, the defender and supporter of his own province, and of his friends on every side; the expeller and plunderer of his foes, —a man full of hospitality, prowess, and renown; the exalter of the clerical orders and men of science; a worthy materies of a King of Ireland for his nobility, personal shape, heroism, wisdom, clemency, and truth, died, after the victory of Extreme Unction and penance, in the monastery of the Dominican Friars, at Roscommon, which he himself had granted to God and that order. Hugh O'Conor, his own son, was inaugurated king over the Connacians, as his successor.''

== Ó Conchubhair Donn ==
Years indicate reign as King of Connacht

Tairrdelbach; 1106–1156
Cathal Crobhdearg; 1189–1224	Ruaidrí; 1156–1189
Áed; 1224–1228	Feidlim; 1233–1265	Aedh Mac Ruaidri; 1228–1233
Áedh na nGall; 1265–1274	Áed Muimnech; 1274–1280

Preceded by Aedh mac Ruaidri Ua Conchobair	King of Connacht; 1233–1265	Succeeded by Aedh mac Felim Ua Conchobair
