= Toirdhealbhach mac Ruaidhrí Ó Conchobhair =

King of Connacht, Ireland

Toirdhealbhach Ó Conchobhair
- Died: 1239
- Occupation: King of Connacht

Toirdhealbhach Ó Conchobhair (died 1239) was a King of Connacht.

Toirdhealbhach (Turlough) was a son of Ruaidhrí Ó Conchobhair, King of Connacht. A daughter of Toirdhealbhach, Bean Mhídhe, seems to have married Maol Mhuire an Sparáin, son of Murchadh Mac Suibhne. The record of this union appears to be evidence that Toirdhealbhach utilised overseas military support from Clann Suibhne in his bid to claim the kingship of Connacht. In 1225, Toirdhealbhach attained the kingship with the aid of Aodh Méith Ó Néill, and was inaugurated at Carnfree. Three years later, in 1228, Toirdhealbhach was expelled from the kingship and replaced by his younger brother, Aodh, who was likewise inaugurated at Carnfree.

== Annalistic references ==
From the Annals of the Four Masters:

- 1190 - Melaghlin O'Naghtan and Gilla-Barry O'Slowey were slain by Turlough, the son of Roderic O'Conor.
- 1202 - Turlough, the son of Roderic O'Conor, escaped from confinement; and Cathal Crovderg made peace with him, and gave him land. He afterwards expelled him, but, at the intercession of the English, made peace with him at once.
- 1207 - Meyler Oge, Murtough O'Brien, and Turlough, the son of Roderic O'Conor, made a predatory incursion into Tir-Fachrach Aidhne, and plundered fifteen ballys (townlands).
- 1210 - Turlough, the son of Roderic O'Conor, took a prey in Moylurg, and carried it with him to Seghais the Curlieus, to his brother Dermot. Hugh, the son of Cathal, pursued him; but Turlough fled before him to the North.
- 1225 - ...Thence he proceeded to Carnfree, where Turlough, the son of Roderic, was inaugurated...
- 1239 - Turlough, the son of Roderic O'Conor (King of Connaught), died.
