= Donn Óge Mag Oireachtaigh =

Donn Óge Mag Oireachtaigh (died 1230) was the lord of Clann Taidg.

== Biography ==
Mag Oireachtaigh had been dispossessed of his lands by King Aedh Ua Conchobair and to regain them enlisted the aid of King Aed Meith Ua Neill of Tír Eógain. This resulted in the deposition of King Aedh in 1225, and a war which great loss of life took place.

However, intervention by English allies of Aedh led to his restoration, with the result that Mag Oireachtaigh was forced to flee.

He was killed during an invasion of Connacht by Richard Mór de Burgh in 1230.

== Annalistic references ==
The Annals of the Four Masters record the deaths of two of his sons:

- 1260: Manus, the son of Hugh Mageraghty, was slain by Donnell O'Flahiff.
- 1266: Dermot Roe, son of Conor, the son of Cormac Mac Dermot, and Donncahy, son of Donn Oge Mageraghty, were blinded by Hugh O'Conor.

== Descendants ==
Anglicised Geraghty, descendants of the family are still found in large numbers in County Galway, County Mayo, County Roscommon, County Sligo and among the Irish diaspora.

== See also ==
- War in Connacht (1225)
- Siege of Galway (1230)
