= Aedh Muimhnech Ó Conchobair =

Aedh Muimhnech mac Felim Ua Conchobair was King of Connacht in Ireland from 1274 to 1280.

Preceded by Aedh mac Felim Ua Conchobair	King of Connacht; 1274–1280	Succeeded by Cathal mac Conchobair Ruadh Ua Conchobair
