= Aedh mac Ruaidri Ó Conchobair =

Aedh mac Ruaidrí Ua Conchobair was King of Connacht from 1228 to 1233. He was one of the sons of the last fully recognized High King of Ireland Ruaidrí Ua Conchobair, and claimed the kingship of Connacht after deposing his brother Toirdhealbhach Ó Conchobhair, after the death of their rival, cousin and former king Aedh Ua Conchobair. In 1233 he was killed in battle by the supporters of his cousin and successor Felim O'Connor. He was the last descendant of Ruaidrí to hold the kingship.

== Life and reign ==
Aedh is first mentioned in the annals in 1225, when with his brother Toirdhealbhach, he invaded Connacht in order to claim its throne from Aedh Ua Conchobair. He and his brother were invited by Aedh's disgruntled vassals Donn Oc MacAirechtaig the lord of Siol Muireadaigh and Aed O Flaithbertaig lord of Iar Connacht. They received the backing of the powerful king of Tir Eoghain Aodh Méith and Toirdhealbhach was made king with Aedh Ua Conchobair retreating to Athlone in order to secure aid from the Anglo-Norman lords there. He was successful in obtaining their backing as well as that of Donnchadh Cairbreach Ó Briain King of Thomond and the Clann Cholmáin Chief of Meath. Its with this force Aedh, his brother Toirdhealbhach and their O'Neill allies were forced to contend, and after a brief fight they disbanded their forces in the anticipation that the allies of Aedh Ua Conchobair would soon leave the province and leave the king exposed once more. Aedh mac Ruaidrí managed to distinguish himself soon after when he intercepted the advance force of Donnchadh Cairbreach Ó Briain, who had been sent on ahead with the plunder and payment they had received, defeating them, taking their plunder and receiving a promise, on pain of excommunication, from Donnchadh to not march against Aedh and his brothers again. Aedh mac Ruaidrí meanwhile retained only a small mercenary force of Anglo-Normans, and so after his allies departure the rebellion simply flared up once more until his allies returned and forced Aedh and his brother to seek refuge once more with Aodh Méith. The author of the Annals of Connacht notes bitterly that the rebellion ''resulted in nothing but the wasting and ruining of a countryside which before had been completely peaceful and prosperous.''

In 1227 Aedh and his brother tried their luck once more with the backing of Richard Mór de Burgh, 1st Baron of Connaught, who expected to become their overlord on victory through his grant from the English king of the province of Connacht. On this hosting they burned Inishmaine Abbey, took hostages and plundered the province. In the next year Aedh Ua Conchobair was dead, apparently through the intrigues of the de Lacy family. Aedh and his brother immediately began a civil war of their own for the kingship destroying the province between them, with Aedh managing to come out on top though he shared power with at least some of his brothers. At a great assembly hosted by Richard Mór de Burgh, who had been recently made Justiciar of Ireland, Aedh was elected king by both the Anglo-Normans and the Irish lords of the province in a compromise demonstrating the influence the two groups wielded in choosing the king. Aedh was appointed king despite the fact Toirdhealbhach, as the senior was better qualified according to traditional Irish succession law, the practical power of de Burgh's backing simply taking precedence. He was inaugurated at the traditional royal site of Carnfree. During the inauguration two of Toirdhealbhach's sons took cattle in raids and Aedh sent men after them who retrieving the cattle and killed one of his nephews Maelsechlainn in the process.

In 1230 Aedh, persuaded by his old ally Donn Oc, decided to turn against Richard Mór and the other Anglo-Normans proclaiming they would never again accept a king who was a vassal of the English and began plundering the lands held by them in Connacht. Richard assembled a large force consisting of large numbers of the Anglo-Normans of Ireland plus many Irish chiefs and marched into west Connacht fighting daily with Aedh's forces as they attempted to install a new claimant Felim O'Connor as king. Aedh decided not to engage them in pitched battle instead moving about the province with his cattle herds and followers. Donn Oc disagreed and with a force of men sought out engagements with the Anglo-Norman forces on their western flank until he was slain along with Brian son of Toirdhealbhach and the forces he had routed fleeing towards Aedh's position. When the routed forces and their pursuers came to the kings position he began to flee killing one of his attackers by thrusting a javelin through him and escaping. The forces of Richard looted the province following their victory and installed Felim as their vassal king, while Aedh fled to the court of Aed Meith again.

Felim was imprisoned for unknown reasons by Richard the next year and in 1232 Aedh made peace with the Justiciar and resumed the kingship of Connacht. His son Conchobar was seemingly a hostage of Richard but managed to escape only to die soon after on an expedition against the men of the Tuatha. In 1233 his old rival and cousin Felim again invaded the province, this time with the support of some of Aedh's chief vassals and pursued him and his supporters to give battle. Aedh, two of his brothers and several of his nephews were killed decimating the power of Ruaidri's descendants who never again held the kingship of Connacht. The author of the Annals of Loch Ce composed a poem on his death;

Aedh, son of Ruaidhri, of the quick onset

Was five years over the province,

Until fell, a loss to every feast,

This man by Fedhlimidh.

| Preceded by Aedh mac Cathal Crobdearg Ua Conchobair / Toirdhealbhach Ó Conchobhair | King of Connacht; 1228–1233 | Succeeded by Felim mac Cathal Crobderg Ua Conchobair |
