= Cathal O'Conor =

Irish king

Cathal McConnor Roe O'Connor (Irish: Cathal mac Conchobair Ruadh Ua Conchobair) was king of Connacht in Ireland. He was son of Connor Roe O'Connor and a member of the Clan Muircheartaigh Uí Conchobhair.

Preceded by Aedh Muimhnech mac Felim Ua Conchobair	King of Connacht; 1280–1288	Succeeded by Maghnus mac Conchobair Ruadh Ua Conchobair
