= Carnfree =

Bronze-age mound in Ireland

Carnfree (Irish Carn Fraoich, Fráech's cairn) is a site south of the village of Tulsk in Roscommon that also lies close to the more celebrated ancient landscape of Rathcroghan. The chief feature here is the bronze-age mound of Carnfree itself, believed to be the cairn of the Connacht warrior Fráech, that was used as an inauguration place up to late medieval times. It also encompasses an area known as Selc featuring Duma Selga (The mound of Selc) and the ecclesiastical site where Saint Patrick baptised the Ui Brian princes of Connacht, who according to the saint's biography may have resided in or administrated from this area.

== Mythology ==
=== Carnfree ===
This mound and area is associated with the Connacht champion Fráech, commonly known as the lover of Queen Medbs daughter Findabair, who is believed to reside in the mound. The Dindshenchas poem on Carn Fraoich actually credits the naming of the mound and area to two different figures called Fráech. The first Fráech mentioned lived after the time of Medb during an unstable period before Ireland's division into Conns half and Moghs Half. He was the son of Conall who ruled both Cruachan and Tara, and was reared with his brothers in the Western capital. Cruachan was attacked by the Munster king Eoghan Taidlech who had his own champion called Fráech and the two great warriors of the same name fought in single combat with Fráech of Cruachan losing the fight. He had however inspired his comrades who eventually overcame and routed the Munsterman in a glorious victory and to honour their fallen brother they buried him in the mound previously called Cnoc na Dala. The second Fráech credited with the mound was the man who wooed Medb's daughter and because of his was persuaded to take part in the Táin Bó Cúailnge where he was drowned by Cuchulain during single combat and beheaded. After the Connacht men's mourning his body was carried off by Sidhe women and taken to the mound that now bears his name.

=== Duma Selga ===
The Dinshenchas also featured the naming of Duma Selga, the mound of the hunt, that was named after the burial of the heads of swine that were originally the foster children of Derbrenn, a daughter of Eochu Feidlech. The foster sons and their wives had eaten nuts from the wood of Caill Aicad that had been enchanted by the men's birth mother and transforming the six of them into red swine. Óengas of the Sidhe was the lover of Derbrenn and took care of them, first making them the responsibility of Leinster king Buichet until his wife craved their meat and Óengas had to watch over them himself. The pigs still had feelings and human speech, begging Óengas to change them back but he could only advise them to first shake the tree of Tarbga and then eat the salmon of Inver Umaill. After making it to the magic tree they were spotted by Medb who desiring the swine, caught and killed them before they got a chance to reach the salmon. The leftover heads were then buried in the mound previously known as Ard Cain.

=== Carn Lámha ===
Carn Lámha translates to mound of the hand. There were later versions of the Carn Fraoich tale that mention a mound nearby where the warriors hand was buried.

== History ==
Carnfrees' importance is documented in the Annals of Connacht that records a number of kingship ceremonies occurring here during medieval times. The main record is that of the inauguration of Felim O'Connor in 1310 which tells how he was made king of Connacht,: and he, Fedlimid mac Aeda meic Eoghoin, was proclaimed in a style as royal, as lordly and as public as any of his race from the time of Brian, son of Eocha Muigmedoin till that day... and this was the most splendid kingship-marriage ever celebrated in Connacht down to that day. His ceremony took place on the mound being joined there by a noble who gave him the rod of kingship and another noble who kept the keys of the mound. Kings from all over Connacht were present there as were twelve bishops who were the successors of the bishops that were there when Saint Patrick ordained the sons of Brion. The eighth century biography of St. Patrick by Tirechan tells how the Saint came to an area called Selc the location of the 'halls of the sons of Brion' and brought twelve bishops with him writing their names on the stones nearby where they camped. It was here that Patrick converted the Uí Briúin princes and baptised them in a nearby lake. While this biography of Patrick is very fictional its possible that it signifies the switching of inauguration rites from Rathcroghan to Carnfree however there are a number of ring barrows in the area indicating that it was already a site of some importance and of course the mounds of Carnfree and Duma Selga showed it was a focus point back in the Bronze Age. Duma Selga is believed to be the mound that is surrounded by the conjoined ring monuments very similar to those at the peak of the hill of Tara (one ring surrounding a mound) with this maybe illustrating the links between Connacht and Tara that occur in both legend and history, the ringfort section very likely to be the seat of the O'Briens.

== Main Sites ==
=== Carnfree Mound ===
It is a small mound about one and a half meters high that sinks slightly at the top and is covered on one side by a dressing of stone. Up until the mid-nineteenth century a proclamation stone stood nearby that featured two sunken footprints, the stone now resides at Clonalis House near Castlerea.

=== Duma Selga ===
The location of this mound has been disputed. A Bronze Age mound, unaltered and perfectly round with a diameter of 21 metres, was believed to be the site. However it is now seen to be the mound that's included in a conjoined earthwork. This mound dished at the top is surrounded by a wide bank joined to a ringfort. It is again very similar to the central feature at the hill of Tara and is a likely location for the royal place of the Uí Briúin. The round topped mound originally believed to be Duma Selga may in fact be Carn Lámha.

=== Ecclesiastical site (Patricks base at Selc) ===
Believed to be the campsite where Patrick and his clergy slept while meeting the Ui Brion. Now there are remains of the base of a rectangular building thought to be a medieval church as well as a circular enclosure also dating from this period.

=== Cloch Fada na gCarn (The long stone of Cairns) ===
There are a number of ring barrows in this region, the most prominent being this one that is a large ring barrow with a standing stone that's nearly 3m high. The diameter of the monument is 36m and there is also a fallen stone nearby that's over 3 and a half meters long. Other ring barrows measure between 9 and 20 meters.

== Sources ==
- "Rathcroghan and Carnfree", Michael Herity, 1991.
- "The Prehistoric Archaeology of Ireland", John Waddell, 1998.
- "Royal inauguration in Gaelic Ireland c. 1100–1600: a cultural landscape study", Elizabeth Fitzpatrick, 2004.
- "The Metrical Dindshenchas Volume 3-Poem 64, edited and translated by Edward J. Gwynn
- "The Prose Tales from the Rennes Dindshenchas Part 2-Poem 71, edited and translated by Whitley Stokes
- "The Metrical Dindshenchas Volume 3-Poem 70, edited and translated by Edward J. Gwynn
