= Aedh Ua Conchobair =

13th-century Irish king

Aedh mac Cathal Crobdearg Ua Conchobair (reigned 1224–1228) was King of Connacht with opposition alongside his uncle Toirdhealbhach mac Ruaidhrí Ó Conchobhair. Aedh succeeded his father Cathal Crobhdearg upon his death in 1224 but struggled to assert control over the entire province. His reign closely mirrored the early years of his father's reign, with two rival claimants, backed by outside powers, fighting an indecisive civil war lasting several years.

== Biography ==
When his father Cathal died in 1224, Aedh initially succeeded him smoothly because, as the Annals of Connacht note, "he had been king in effect by the side of his father and already held all the hostages of Connacht. And God granted him this kingdom, for no crime was committed in Connacht at the moment of his accession save one robbery on the road to Cruach, and the hands and feet of the robber were cut off, and the violation of one woman by O Mannachan's son, who was blinded forthwith for the offence." His accession is celebrated in the poem Congaibh rom t'aghaidh, a Aodh, in which he is said to be the prophesied Aodh who will drive the English 'usurpers' from Ireland.

His first major act as king was to join an expedition against the de Lacy family by the majority of Irish and Norman lords from the south of Ireland on behalf of the King of England. This brought these lords into conflict with the de Lacys' ally Aodh O'Neill, King of Ailech, and ended in a stalemate due to reluctance to attack O'Neill's superior defensive position.

Perhaps as a result of this aggression, O'Neill in the following year marched an army into Connacht and installed Toirdhealbhach as king. He received the backing of Aedh's major discontented vassals, Donn Oc MacAirechtaig, the lord of Siol Muireadaigh, as well as the Ó Flaithbheartaigh lords of western Connacht, whom Aedh had confiscated lands from. Only his hereditary marshal Cormac Mac Diarmata, King of Moylurg, remained loyal. Looking for allies among the Normans of Meath, Aedh proceeded to Athlone and there promised them payment and gifts if they would back him as king, as his father had previously done years earlier. They agreed and with another ally, Donnchadh Cairbreach Ó Briain, King of Thomond, drove both Toirdhealbhach and his O'Neill allies from Connacht.

Aedh thereafter received the submission of his rebellious vassals and guarantees to no longer support his rivals, the sons of Ruadhri. However, they were merely biding their time until Aedh's Norman allies dispersed, and promptly rebelled again in 1225 when their armies left the kingdom. Aedh's only response was to recall his allies once more who again answered his call eagerly as they were permitted to plunder the province as payment. Toirdhealbhach and his followers were again forced to seek refuge in Ulster with the O'Neill's and in 1226, many hostages, including Aedh's own son and daughter, were given to the Normans as guarantee of future payment for their support. In 1227 Aedh was summoned to attend court in Dublin by the English where they were apparently plotting his capture or death. Only the intervention of his friend William Marshal, the 2nd Earl of Pembroke, allowed him to escape. He later burned Athlone in revenge, killing its constable and freeing the hostages he had previously handed over.

After this he proceeded to the court of the King of Tir Chonaill, likely to try and win his support, but seems to have come away empty-handed, with his wife being captured by Toirdhealbhach's followers on the return journey and handed over to the English. The next year, having been expelled from Connacht by his own subjects once again, he was murdered at the court of Geoffrey de Mareys, according to the Annals of Connacht by a carpenter working on behalf of the de Lacys.

Aedh's reign was mostly a failure marred by conflicts with his vassals and the use of foreign troops to impose his authority, something which in itself was not uncommon for later kings of Connacht. His rival Toirdhealbhach mac Ruaidhrí Ó Conchobhair was deposed in the same year as his death by his own younger brother Aedh mac Ruaidri Ó Conchobair, who was in turn killed and succeeded by Aedh's younger brother Felim O'Connor in 1233.

== Offspring ==
Aedh had five sons and a daughter, including:

- Ruaidrí Ó Conchobair, grandfather of Aedh Ó Conchobair
- Una Ní Conchobair, wife of Robert de Gernon

Preceded by Cathal Crobderg Ua Conchobair	King of Connacht; 1224–1228	Succeeded by Aedh mac Ruaidri Ua Conchobair
