= Cathal Crobhdearg Ua Conchobair =

Thirteenth-century king of Connacht, Ireland

- King of Connacht
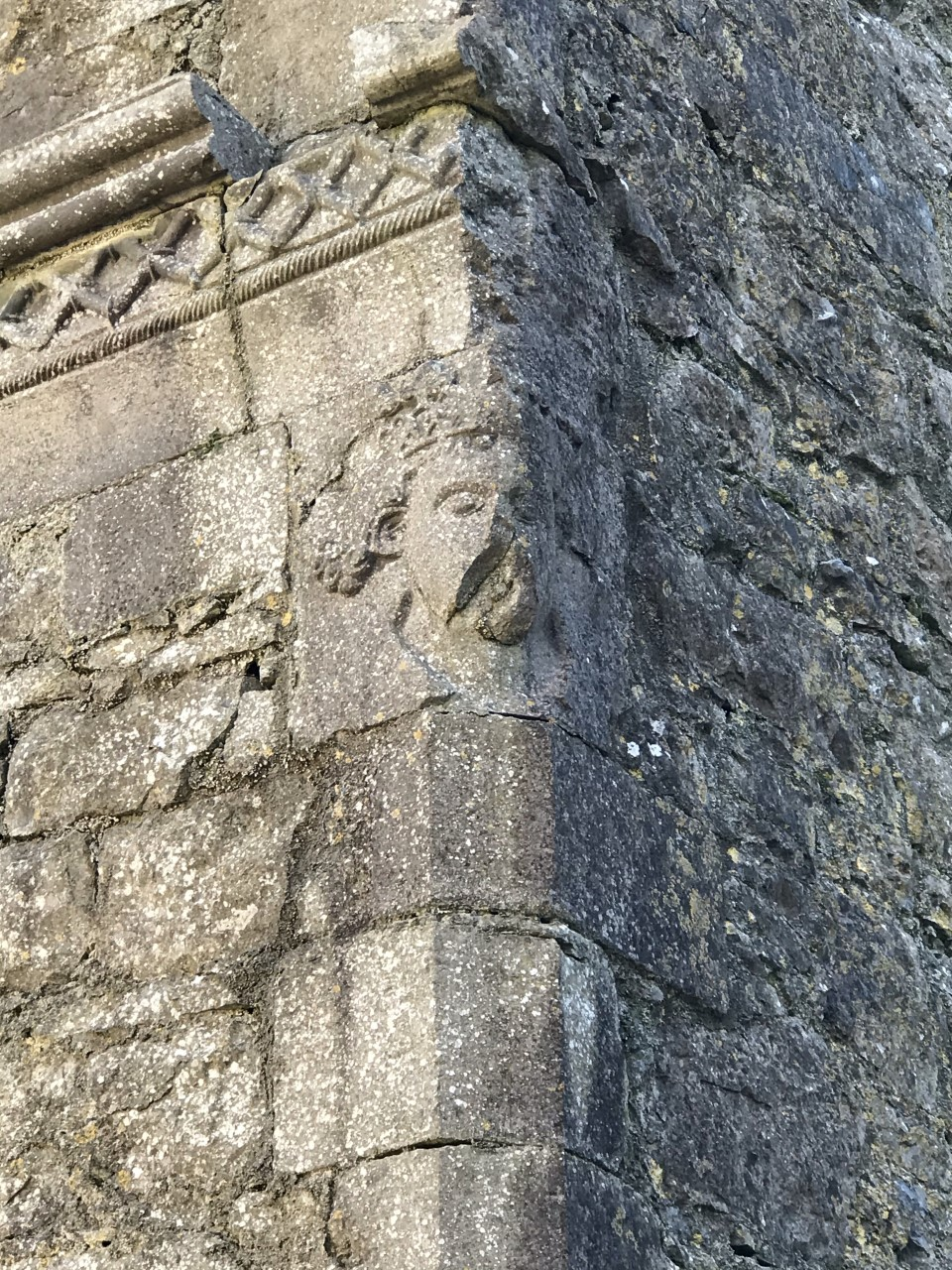
- Possible depiction of Cathal Crobhdearg Ua Conchobair, Abbeyknockmoy
- Born: 1153
- Died: 1224 (aged 70–71)

Cathal Crobhdearg Ua Conchobair (Anglicised as Cathal O'Connor/O'Conor and Cathal the Red-handed O'Conor) (1153–1224), was a king of Connacht. He was the youngest son of the High King of Ireland Tairrdelbach Ua Conchobair and brother to the last fully recognized High King Ruadri Ua Conchobair. His own sons Aedh Ua Conchobair and Feidhlimidh Ua Conchobair were kings of Connacht after him.

His reign was a troubled one dominated by internal feuds and the outside influence of powerful Anglo-Norman lords. From his base west of the river Shannon, he was forced to deal with the Norman invaders and was a competent leader despite his problems, avoiding major conflicts and winning minor skirmishes. Ua Conchobair attempted to make the best of the new situation with Ireland divided between Norman and Gaelic rulers. His long reign was perhaps a sign of relative success. He is the subject, as Cáhal Mór of the Wine Red Hand, of the poem A Vision of Connaught in the Thirteenth Century by the 19th-century Irish nationalist James Clarence Mangan.

== Biography ==
He was king of Connacht with opposition from 1189 to 1202 with Cathal Carragh Ua Conchobair, son of the previous king Conchobar Maenmaige Ua Conchobair, Crobhdearg's nephew. In 1190 a meeting was held at Clonfert to try and establish peace between the two claimants but was unsuccessful. Crobhdearg narrowly escaped drowning soon after when his ship was wrecked in a storm on Lough Ree, himself and six others being the only survivors, thirty-six others perishing. In 1195 he led a hosting into Munster destroying several castles and towns. By 1197 conflict had flared up between him and Rory O'Flaherty lord of west Connacht whereupon he was taken prisoner by Crobhdearg after having fled from him the previous year by sea to Thomond. In 1199 Crobhdearg made peace with Cathal Carragh granting him lands in Connacht, seemingly gaining recognition as undisputed king in return. In the same year he raided lands of the Normans in Connacht and the next year the foreigners of Meath with Rory O'Flaherty lord of west Connacht dying in his service on this expedition. Crobhdearg then turned on Cathal Carragh who managed to flee beforehand to the woods and defeat an army sent to pursue him by the king. Carragh then approached the Norman lord William de Burgh giving up his son to them as a guarantee of payment for their aid. They marched on Connacht with allies from Leinster, Thomond, Limerick and Dublin gaining the submission of many of the lords of Connacht forcing Crobhdearg to flee north first to Fermanagh, then the court of the O'Neill's gaining their backing for the kingship.

Crobhdearg didn't retaliate until 1201 when with O'Neill and the king of Firmanach he made an expedition into Connacht, only for them to part ways with Crobhdearg after laying waste to Moylurg because of disagreements about the course of the campaign. Crobhdearg had wanted to engage William de Burgh and Carragh but his allies refused and turned back north only to be caught up with and defeated by the very army they had sought to avoid. Soon after he gained the aid of John de Courcy who marched against Carragh on his behalf only to be defeated as well, with Crobhdearg taken prisoner by the Normans of Meath as he could no longer pay their promised wages, but released the same year and re-inaugurated on the stone at Clonalis. Now it was Crobhdearg who solicited the aid of William de Burgh and in 1202 they marched into Connacht killing Carragh. In return, Crobhdearg accepted William's overlordship and billeted his troops throughout Connacht only for the people of Connacht to turn on them en masse massacring most after hearing a false rumour of de Burghs demise. This put a dent in de Burghs ambitions and he soon after returned to Munster.

In 1205 one of Crobhdearg's sons Teige died of sickness at Clonmacnoise. The annals are more silent for the rest of his reign though this perhaps denotes more stability in the kingdom following the decades of civil war. When John King of England arrived in Ireland in 1210 Crobhdearg submitted to him and was part of his hosting against Hugh de Lacy. John told him to bring his son Aedh to a subsequent meeting the two were to have so that he could be granted a royal charter for lands in Connacht. Crobhdearg's council however advised against this and when Crobhdearg arrived without his son John took some of his leading followers as hostages to England including the king of Moylurg. He founded Ballintubber Abbey in 1216. His wife, Mór Ní Briain, a daughter of king Domnall Mór Ua Briain of Thomond, died in 1218.

In 1224 Cathal wrote to Henry III as Lord of Ireland, again asking that his son and heir Od (Aedh) be granted all of Connacht, in particular those parts, Breifne, owned by William Gorm de Lacy. He died in the same year and was succeeded by his son, Aedh mac Cathal Crobdearg Ua Conchobair ''for he had been king by the side of his father (rí ri láim a athar) and already held all the hostages of Connacht. And God granted him this kingdom, for no crime was committed in Connacht at the moment of his accession save one robbery on the road to Cruach, and the hands and feet of the robber were cut off, and the violation of one woman by O Mannachan's son, who was blinded forthwith for the offence.'' The Annals of Connacht give his death obit as,

- The King most feared and dreaded on every hand in Ireland, the king who carried out most plunderings and burnings against Galls and Gaels who opposed him, the king who was the fiercest and harshest towards his enemies that ever lived; the king who most blinded, killed and mutilated rebellious and disaffected subjects; the king who best established peace and tranquility of all the kings of Ireland; the king who built most monasteries and houses for religious communities; the king who most comforted clerks and poor men with food and fire on the floor of his own habitation; the king whom of all the kings in Ireland God made most perfect in every good quality; the king on whom God most bestowed fruit and increase in crops; the king who kept himself to one consort and practiced continence before God from her death till his own; the king whose wealth was partaken by laymen and clerics, infirm men, women and helpless folk, as had been prophesied in the writings and the visions of saints and righteous men of old, the king who suffered most mischances in his reign, but God raised him up from each in turn; the king who with manly valour and by the strength of his hand preserved his kingship and rule. And it is in the time of this king that tithes were first levied for God in Ireland. This righteous and upright king, this prudent, pious, just champion, died in the robe of a Grey Monk, after a victory over the world and the devil, in the monastery of Knockmoy, which with the land belonging to it he had himself offered to God and the monks, on the twenty-seventh day of May as regards the solar month and on a Monday as regards the week-day, and was nobly and honourably buried, having been for six and thirty years sole monarch of the province of Connacht.

== Inauguration ==
An account of Cathal Crobhdearg's inauguration has been preserved, written down by Donogh Bacach Ó Maolconaire, the son of O'Connor's very inaugurator Tanaide Ó Maolconaire, who was also his historian and recorded all tributes due to O'Connor. Among those present was his door-keeper, O'Feenaghty, his physician Mac Tully, and Mac Aodhagáin, his brehon.

== Family tree ==
- Kg. = King of Connacht

  Tairrdelbach, King of Connacht & Ard Rí na hÉireann, 1088–1156
   |
   |_____________________________________________________________________________
   |                                              |
   |                                              |
  Ruaidrí, last Ard Rí na hÉireann, c.1115–1198.  Cathal Crobhdearg, 1153–1224
                                                 =Mor Muman Ní Briain, d. 1218
                                                  |
    ______________________________________________|___________________________
    |                                                                         |
    |                                                                         |
    Áed, Kg. Conn. 1224–28.                                               Fedlimid, Kg. Conn 1230–31; 1233–65. died 1265.
    |                                                                         |
    |________________________________ __________|___________
    |            |                  |                               |                    |
    |            |                  |                               |                    |
    Cathal Dall Ruaidrí Toirrdelbach, Kg. 1249–50.          Áed, kg. 1265–74.  Áed Muimnech, Kg. 1274–80.
    |            |                  |
    |            |                  |
    Áed, Éoghan, Kg. 1274 Tadg Ruad, Kg. 1274–8.
  Kg. 1274.      |
    _____________|___________________
    |                               |
    |                               |
    Donnchad Áed, Kg. 1293–1309.
    |                               |
    |                               |__________________________________________________
    Ruaidrí na Fed                  |                                |                |
   Kg. 1316;d. 1321.                |                                |                |
                                    Fedlimid, Kg.1310–15;16.  Cathal na bhFeadh Toirredlbach, Kg 1317–18;24–42;43–45.
                                    |                             died 1361.          |
                                    |                                                 |
                             Ó Conchubhair Ruadh Ó Conchubhair Donn

| Preceded by Cathal Carragh Ua Conchobhair | King of Connacht; 1202–1224 | Succeeded by Aedh mac Cathal Crobdearg Ua Conchobair |
