= Brian Breifneach Ua Conchobair =

Brian Breifneach Ua Conchobair, Prince of Connacht, fl. 1156.

Brian Breifneach was one of some twenty-two sons of King Tairrdelbach Ua Conchobair of Connacht (1088-1156. His nickname, Breifneach, indicates that he was fostered in Breifne, probably by King Tigernan Ua Ruairc.

Upon the death of Tairrdelbach at Dunmore, County Galway in spring 1156, Brian was apparently considered a very creditable successor to the kingship. Other candidates were his brothers Ruaidri Ua Conchobair, Brian Luighneach and Muirchertach Muimneach.

To prevent this, Ruaidri arrested Brian Breifneach, Brian Luighneach and Muircheartach Muimneach. As an extra precaution, he had Brian blinded, preventing him from becoming an active contender. Ruaidhri went on to serve as king of Connacht from 1156, and King of Ireland from 1166, till he was deposed in 1183.
