= Mór Ní Conchobair =

Mor Ni Conchobair, Princess of Connacht and Queen of Munster, died 1190.

Mor was the only full sister of King Ruaidhri Ua Conchobair of Connacht. Their parents were Tairrdelbach Ua Conchobair and Caillech De Ni hEidhin of Aidhne. She went on to marry King Tairdelbach Ua Briain (died 1167), who had sons

- Muirchertach - succeeded his father but died in 1168
- Brian of Slieve Bloom - blinded 1169, his son Muirchertach contested the kingdom of Thomond
- Domnall Mor Ua Briain - reigned 1168-1194 as last King of Munster

Mor herself died in 1190. Her brother Ruaidhri died in 1198.
