= Tommaltach Ua Conchobair =

Tommaltach Ua Conchobair, bishop of Elphin and archbishop of Armagh, lived from c. 1150–1201.

== Family background ==
Ua Conchobair was a grandson of King Tairrdelbach Ua Conchobair of Connacht (1088–1156) via his son, Aed. However, Tairrdelbach had two sons of that name, one of whom, Aedh Dall Ua Conchobair, was blinded by Tairrdelbach for rebellion in 1136.

Tommaltach was nephew to Ruaidhri, King of Ireland (reigned 1156–1183) and King Cathal of Connacht, (reigned 1202–1224); first cousin to Rose, wife of Hugh de Lacy, Lord of Meath (died 1186), and associate of archbishop of Dublin, Lorcan Ua Tuathail (died 1180).

== Early career ==
He became bishop of Elphin about 1174, and may have travelled to Rome to receive confirmation. He may have been responsible for the founding of a Cistercian house at Athlone. In 1179 he attended Ua Tuathail's council in Dublin, giving the latter's reforms his support. Ua Conchobair travelled with the archbishop to Armagh early in 1180 to settle the diocese's succession dispute; Ua Tuathail, at the time the Papal Legate to Ireland, appointed Ua Conchobair to the position.

== Archbishop of Armagh ==
However, he was not fully accepted by the local clergy on his own terms until 1181. In 1184, there was an attempt to replace him with a member of the ruling dynasty of the kingdom of Airgialla, bishop Mael Isu Ua Cerbaill of Clogher, with Ua Conchobair unable to fully regain his see until 1186.

He appears to have maintained good relations with Hugh de Lacy, Lord of Meath, and King John during the latter's visit to Ireland in 1185. Later he was assisted by de Courcy in commissioning a life of Saint Patrick to advance Armagh's claim to the primacy of Ireland, against that of Dublin.

At the 1192 Synod of Dublin, he successfully regained for Armagh control of the diocese of Louth, which had been claimed by King Donnchadh Ua Cearbaill of Airgialla in the 1150s.

Ua Conchobair spent the last five years of his life in Drogheda. Much of his correspondence and diocesan documents have been lost, but those that survive include letters from Innocent III concerning disputed elections, support for canons of the Arrouasian order and the canonical position of women.

He died in 1201 while travelling to Armagh, and was buried at the Cistercian abbey of Mellifont.
