= Brian Luighnech Ua Conchobhair =

Prince of Connacht (died 1181)

Brian Luighneach Ua Conchobhair (died 23 May 1181) was a prince of Connacht.

== Family background ==
Ua Conchobhair was one of at least twenty-three children of King Tairrdelbach Ua Conchobair of Connacht (reigned 1106–1156). His mother's name is uncertain.

== Early life ==
Brian's nickname, Luighnech, is taken from the territory of Luigne in what is now County Sligo. Its ruling family were the O hEaghra (O'Hara).

In 1156, his father died at Dunmore, County Galway. His brother, Ruaidhri, immediately moved to neutralise any opposition to his succession as king by arresting and imprisoning three of his brothers, including Brian, all considered credible candidates for succeeding Tairrdelbach. Brian seems to have come to terms with Ruaidhri and was released. One of the brothers, Aedh Dall Ua Conchobair, was not so lucky; Ruaidhri had him blinded.

== Crich Coipre ==
Brian became lord of Cairbre Drom Cliabh (barony of Carbury in what is now County Sligo. During the late 1170s, King Ruaidhri's power as both King and High King of Ireland was under severe strain from both Gaelic-Irish and Anglo-Norman alike.

This encouraged King Flaithbertaigh of Tyrconnell to mount raids into northern Connacht, an area over which the Cineál Chonaill had long claimed jurisdiction. Brian assembled a force and met him in battle on the Saturday before Whitsuntide, joined by his son, Donogh, his brother Maghnus Ua Conchobair, and members of leading Connacht gentry such as Aed Ó Ceallaigh, Eachmarcach Ó Muireadhaigh, Giolla Críst Ó Roduibh, and many others.

The Annals of the Four Masters said of the battle:

Flaherty O'Muldory, Lord of Tirconnell, defeated the sons of the King of Connacht ... Sixteen of the sons and chieftains were slain by the Kinel Connell, as well as many others, both of the nobles and the plebeians. They held the Connacians under subjection for a long time after this battle ... slain by Flaherty ... were Brian and Manus, two sons of Turlough More; and Mulrony; and .... two sons of Hugh O'Connor.

The list of dead included Brian's son, Donogh; Ó Cellaigh, Ó Muireadhaigh, Ó Roduibh, and members of the O'Mulrenin and Mac Giolla Buidhe clans.

== Descendants ==
Brian was of ancestor of the O Connor Sligo dynasty. Only one member of the family ever succeeded to the kingship of Connacht, but they were Lords of Cairbre until the mid-17th century.

== Ó Conchobhair Sligigh Family Tree ==
 Brian Luighneach Ó Conchobhair, k. 1181.
 |
 |
 Aindrais
 |
 |
 Brian
 |
 |
 Tadhg, died 1313
 |
 |
 Domhnall, died 1307
 |
 |_____________________________________________________________
 |          |                                      |
 |          |                                      |
 Ruaidhrí, Cathal Muircheartach
 died 1316.    |                                      |
            |___________________                   | 
            |      |          |                 Domhnall
            |      |          |                    | 
         Maghnus Ruaidhrí   Cathal Óg            | 
            |                 |                    | 
            |                 |                    |
          Tadhg Tadhg                |
                                                   |
 __________________________________________________|_______________
 |                      |                    |                    |
 |                      |                    |                    |
 Muircheartach Bachach Brian Eoghan Toirdhealbhach Carrach
 |                      |                    |                    |
 |__________            |___________         |___________         |_______
 |         |            |         |          |          |         |      |
 |         |            |         |          |          |         |      |
 Ruaidhrí  Domhnall Maghnus Ruaidhrí   Domhnall Tadhg Aodh Ruaidhrí
 Bachach                |                    |                    |  
 |                      |                    |                    |
 |                      Feidhlimidh Cathal Óg Tadhg
 Ruaidhrí Óg            |                    |                    | 
                        |                    |                    |
                        Ruaidhrí             Tadhg Tadhg Óg
                                             |
                        _____________________|______________________
                        |                    |                     |
                        |                    |                     | 
                        Sir Domhnall Cathal Óg Eoghan  
                                             |
                        _____________________|_______________________
                        |                    |                      |  
                        |                    |                      |
                        Sir Donnchadh Domhnall Tadhg Og
                                             |
                        _____________________|_______________________
                        |                                           |
                        |                                           |
                        Sir An Calbhach Donnchadh
