= Máel Ísa Ua Conchobair =

Irish royal figure and abbot, died 1223

Mael Isa Ua Conchobair, Prince of Connacht and Abbot of Roscommon, died 1223.

== Family background ==
Mael Isa was a son of King Tairrdelbach Ua Conchobair of Connacht by one of his six wives.

He is listed as having two full-brothers (Jaski, EIKS, p. 152 n44) - Aedh Dall Ua Conchobair (died 1194) and Tadg Alainn (died 1143/1144), all by Tairrdelbach's primary wife. He had twenty half-brothers, products of Tairrdelbach's marriages and relationships with at least six other women.

== Abbot of Roscommon ==
Mael Isa is recorded as a generous benefactor to Coman's monastery. His father had bestowed upon it a relic known as An Bachall Buidhe, which contains a portion of the True Cross brought to Ireland in 1123. It is now known as the Cross of Cong.

Though Gaelic clerics could and did marry, it is not known for certain if Mael Isa had any offspring.
