= Donnell Mor Mideach Ua Conchobair =

Irish regional prince

Donnell Mor Mideach Ua Conchobair, Prince of Connacht, fl. 1144 to 1176.

Donnell was a son of King Tairrdelbach Ua Conchobair of Connacht (1088-1156 and Derbforgaill Ni Lochlainn (died 1151. Derbforgaill was the daughter of King Domnall Mac Lochlainn of Ailech, and one of Tairrdelbach's six wives. Domnall's full siblings were Aed Dall Ua Conchobair (blinded 1136) and Cathal Migaran (died 1152. He was nicknamed Mideach because he was fostered in Mide, possibly by King Murchad Ua Mael Sechlainn (died 1153.

His demesne lands were the Corran in what is now County Sligo, and appears to have ruled Breifne for his father. He succeeded his brother, Conchobar Ua Conchobair, as tainiste of Connacht upon the latter's assassination in 1144 but was opposed by another brother, Ruaidhri Ua Conchobair. Domnall led military campaigns on behalf of his father between 1145 and 1148, but in 1152 was imprisoned by his full-brother, Cathal Migaran. He seems to have subsequently fallen from favor with his father, who replaced him as tainiste with Ruaidhri, who would become king in 1156.

Domnall died in 1176 as lord of north Connacht. He was buried in Mayo Abbey. He had sons Conchobair, and Donnchad (alive 1181. Dubhaltach Mac Fhirbhisigh preserves the following notice of him:

Clann Bhriain an Bhuid in An Corran was from Domnall Mor of An Cheis s.[son] of Tiordhealbach Mor.
