= Cong Abbey =

Historic site in County Mayo, Ireland

Cong Abbey Cúnga Fheichín
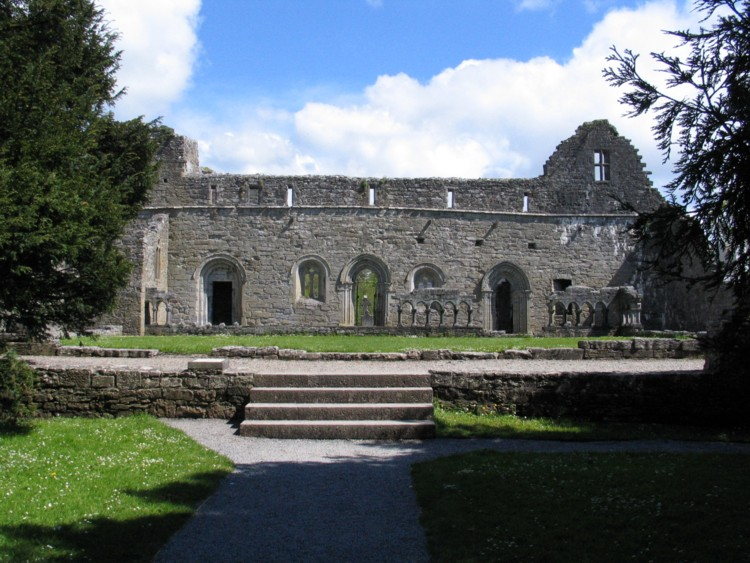
- View of the remains of Cong Abbey

- Location within Ireland

Monastery information
- Order: Augustinian canons
- Established: 7th century (original structure), 12th century
- Disestablished: 1542
- Diocese: Archdiocese of Tuam

People
- Founder: Saint Feichin

Architecture
- Heritage designation: National Monument
- Style: early Gothic

Site
- Location: Cong, County Mayo, Ireland
- Coordinates: 53°32′25″N 9°17′12″W
- Visible remains: church building, cloisters, monks' fishing house
- Public access: Yes

Cong Abbey also known as the Royal Abbey of Cong, is a historic site located at Cong, County Mayo, in Ireland's province of Connacht. The ruins of the former Augustinian abbey mostly date to the 13th century and have been described as featuring some of finest examples of medieval ecclesiastical architecture in Ireland.

== History ==
In the early 7th century, a church was built at this site, reportedly by Saint Feichin. A later building was destroyed by fire in 1114. Within the next twenty years or so, Turlough Mor O’Connor, the High King of Ireland, refounded the abbey. Raiders from Munster destroyed the buildings in 1137 but they were rebuilt by King Turlough. The Abbey was refounded as an Augustinian settlement in 1138. It was one of the earliest Augustinian settlements south of Armagh, which was founded in 1126.

In 1198, his son, Ruaidrí Ua Conchobair (Rory O'Connor), Ireland's last High King, constructed new buildings and also lived the last 15 years of his life at the abbey. He died here and was reportedly briefly buried in the abbey before being exhumed and re-interred at Clonmacnoise.

Cong Abbey was also closely associated with the O'Duffy family from at least 1097 to 1501. The Annals of the Four Masters record that in 1150, Muireadhach Ua Dubhthaigh, Archbishop of Connacht, died at Cong aged 75. His name is inscribed upon the processional Cross of Cong.

In the 1307 the abbey was reconstructed and dedicated to St Mary. Cong Abbey was suppressed sometime after 1542 and later fell into ruins.

The last (nominal) abbot was Father Patrick Prendergast, parish priest of Cong from 1795 until his death in 1829. He was the preserver of the Cross of Cong. After his death, the cross was bought by James MacCullagh for the Royal Irish Academy.

The first restoration of the abbey was started by Benjamin Guinness in 1855, soon after he had bought nearby Ashford Castle in 1852.

== Architecture ==
The remains of Cong Abbey have been praised as featuring some of the finest examples of early gothic architecture and masonry in Ireland. The present church, and possibly the fragmentary cloister where the monks worked and prayed, belong to the rebuilding of the early 13th century. The north doorway of the church, and the elaborate doorways that open onto the cloister from the east range of the monastery, may pre-date the attack by William de Burgo. The doorway with two fine windows on either side belongs to the chapter house, where the monastery's daily business was conducted as well as a chapter of the rule being read each day. This was also where the community gathered to confess their sins publicly. The sculpture in the abbey, which is some of the finest in Ireland, suggests links to French styles of the period.

The grounds of the abbey also contain a monks' fishing house, probably built in the 15th or 16th century, on an island in the River Cong leading towards nearby Lough Corrib. The house is built on a platform of stones over a small arch which allows the river to flow underneath the floor. There is a trapdoor in the floor in which the fish may have been kept fresh. According to local tradition, a line was connected from the fishing house to the monastery kitchen to alert the cook to fresh fish.

== Today ==
Cong Abbey is a national monument in the care of the Commissioners for Public Works.

== Gallery ==
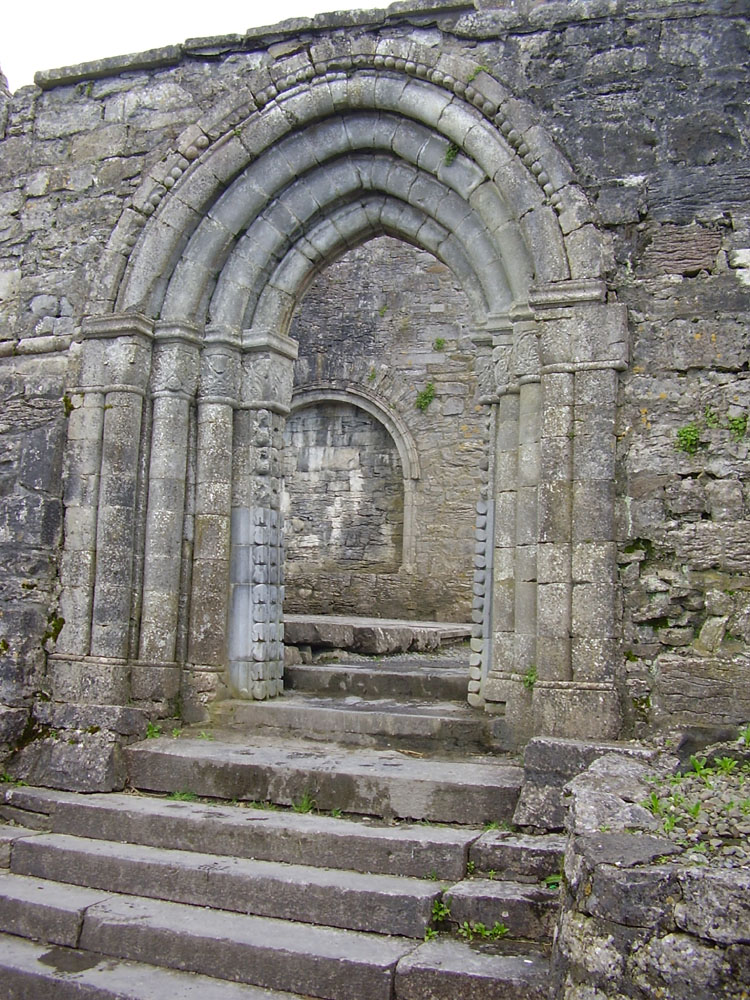
The North doorway

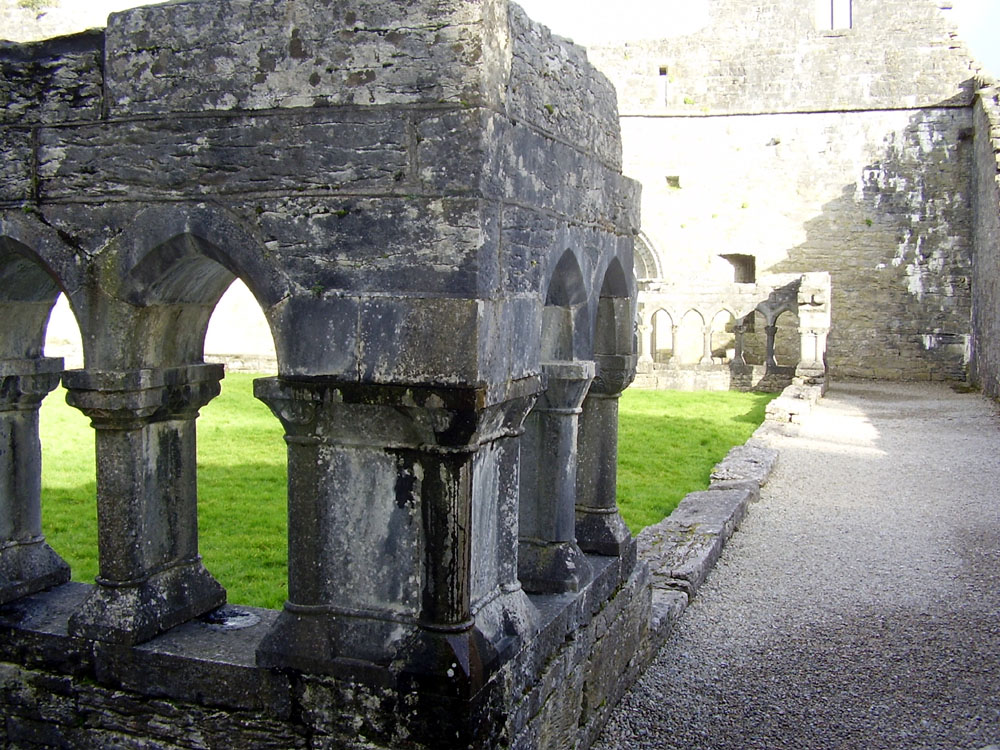
Cong Abbey cloisters

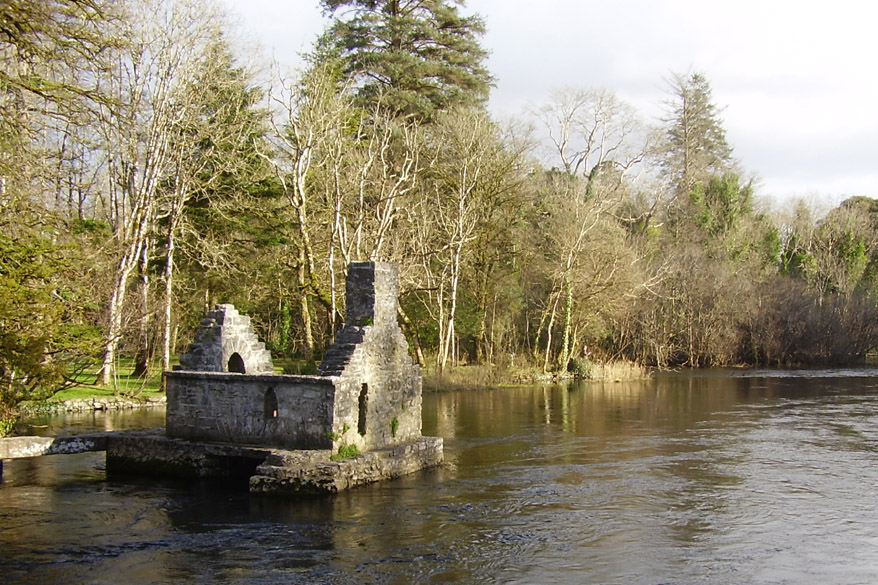
Monks' Fishing House

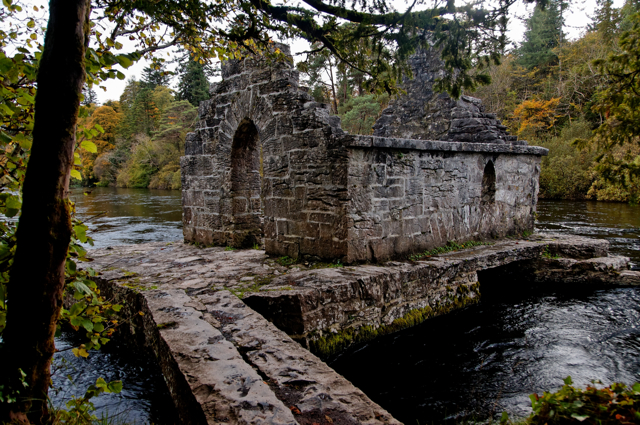
Monks' Fishing House Closeup

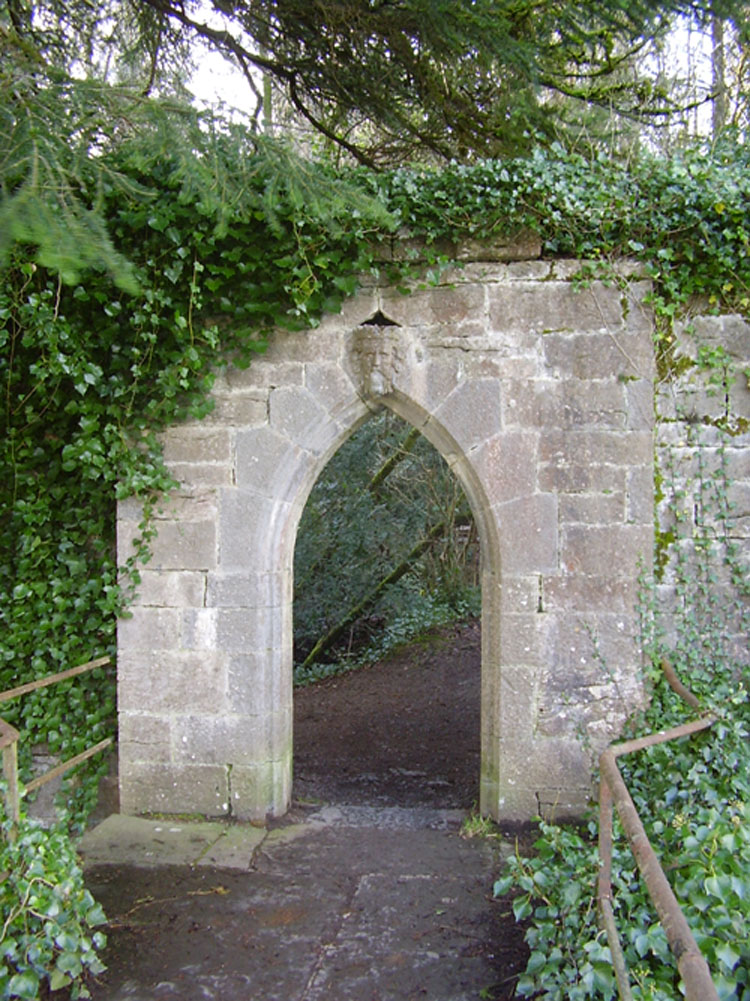
Doorway in Cong Abbey grounds with carving of Rory O’Connor

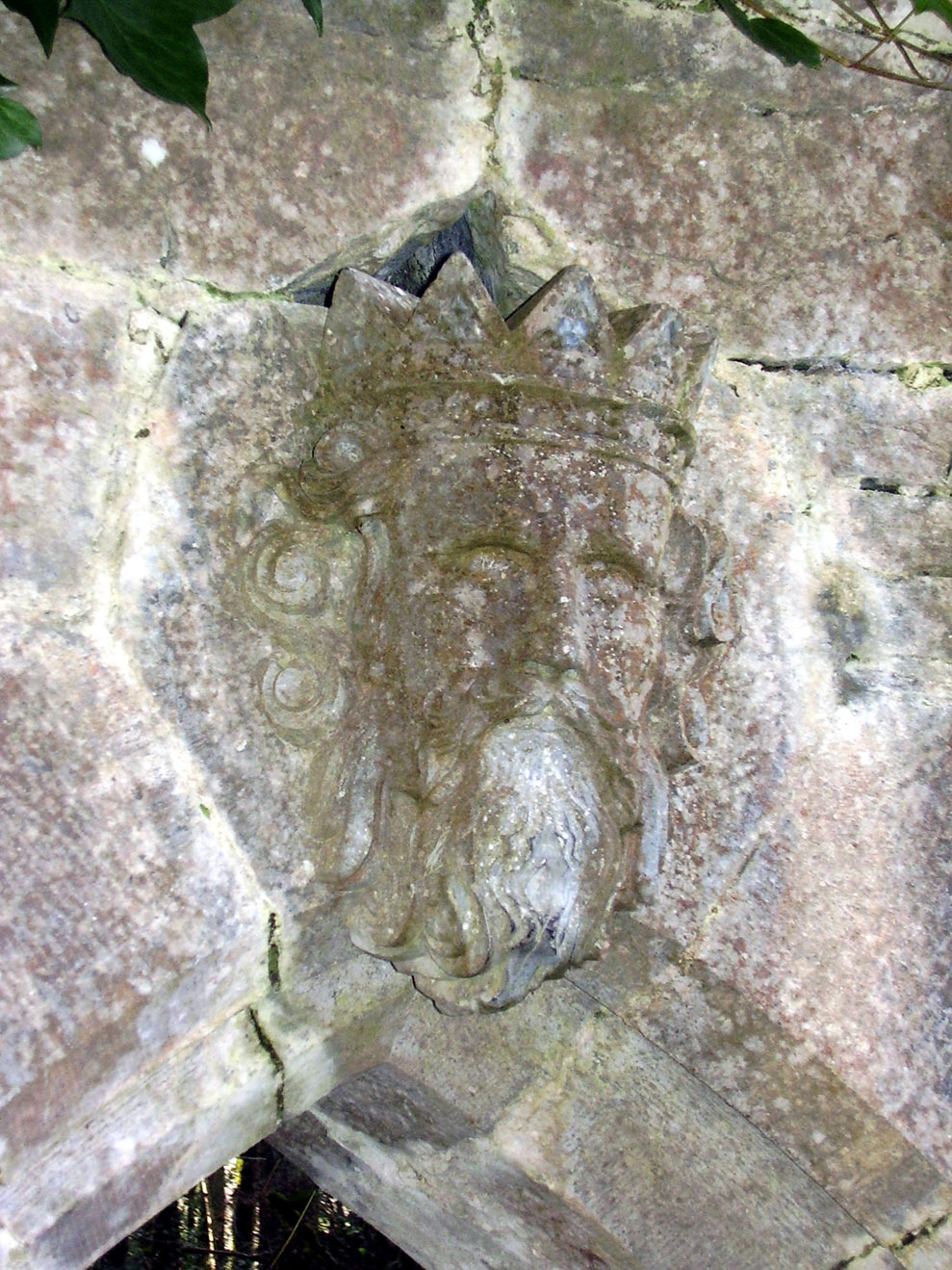
Closeup of stone carving of Rory O’Connor

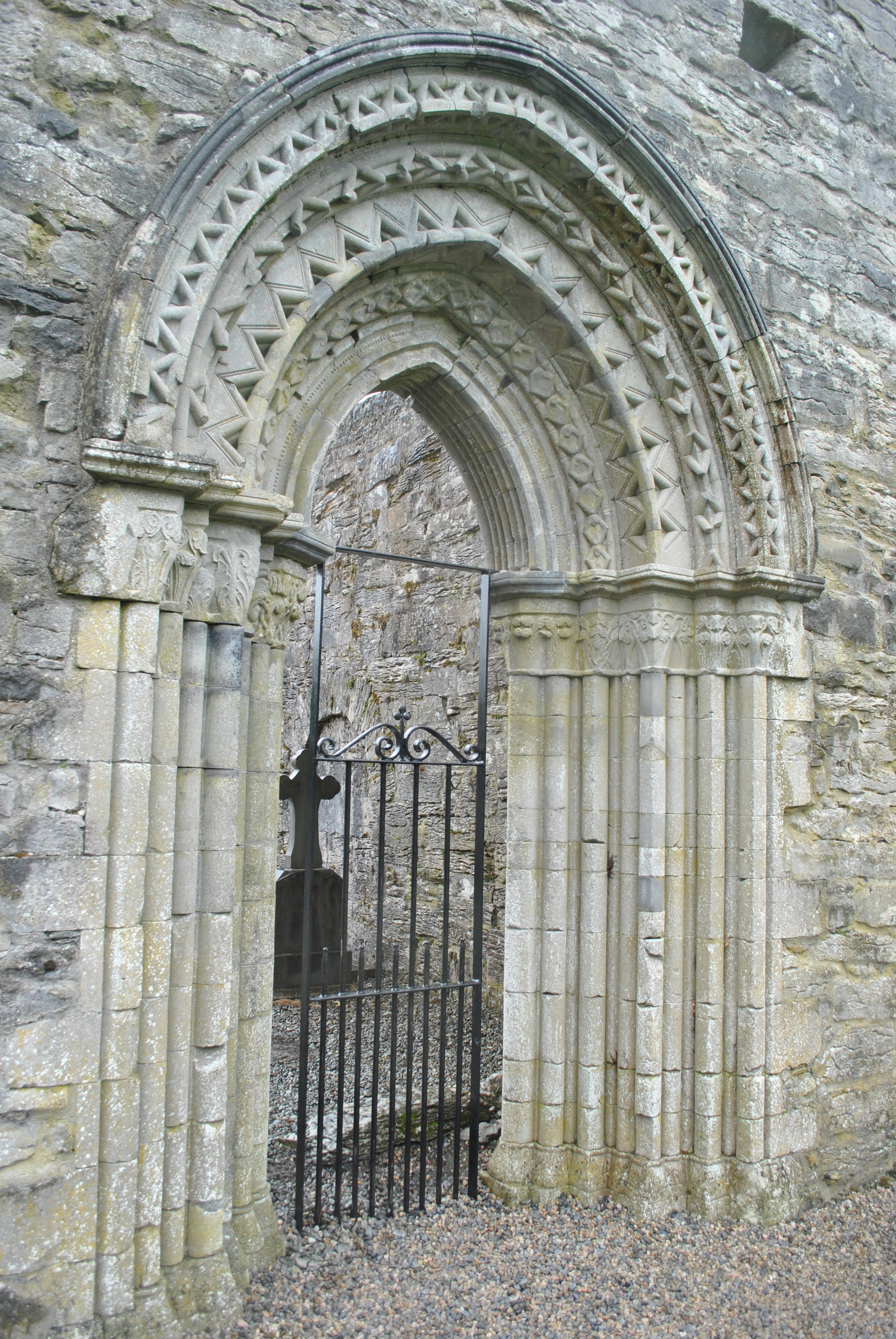

== See also ==
- List of abbeys and priories in Ireland (County Mayo)
