= Patrick Prendergast =

Patrick Prendergast may refer to:

- Patrick Prendergast (academic), Provost of Trinity College, Dublin
- Patrick Prendergast (abbot) (c. 1741–1829), last Abbot of Cong and guardian of the Cross of Cong
- Patrick Eugene Prendergast (1868–1894), assassin of Chicago mayor Carter Harrison Sr.

== See also ==
- Paddy Prendergast (disambiguation)
