= Muirghis Cananach Ua Conchobhair =

Muirghis Cananach Ua Conchobhair, Prince of Connacht, died 1224.

Muirghis was one of the children of the last Gaelic King of Ireland, Ruaidrí Ua Conchobair. He became a monk and was a noted poet and singer.

His death is noted in the Annals of Lough Ce:

'Muirghes Cananach, son of Ruaidhri O'Conchobhair, the most expert man that ever came of the Gaeidhel in reading, and in psalm-singing, and in versemaking, died in this year, and was interred in Cunga-Feichin (Cong), after the triumph of unction and penitence.
