= Diarmait Ó Conchobair =

Diarmait mac Ruaidrí Ó Conchobair, Prince of Connacht, died 1221.

Diarmait was one of the younger sons of King of Ireland, Ruaidrí Ua Conchobair (died 1198).

The Annals of the Four Masters, sub anno 1203, say of him:

- Murtough the Teffian, son of Conor Moinmoy, who was the son of Roderic O'Conor, was slain by 'Dermot, the son of Roderic, and Hugh, the son of Roderic, namely, by his own two paternal uncles, on the green of Kilmacduagh.

The Annals of Lough Ce give an account of Diarmait's death:

Diarmaid, son of Ruaidhri, son of Toirdhelbhach Mór O'Conchobhair, was slain by Thomas Mac Uchtraigh as he was coming from Insi-Gall, whilst collecting a fleet for the purpose of acquiring the sovereignty of Connacht; and this was a great pity, viz.:—the materies of a king of Erinn to fall so before his time.

Insi Gall was either the Hebrides or the Isle of Man, both of which compromised the Kingdom of the Isles, ruled in 1221 by Rǫgnvaldr Guðrøðarson, King of the Isles (1187–1226).

Diarmait's recorded children were sons Diarmait (fl. 1237), Donnchad (fl. 1237), Muirchertach (k. 1237) and Cormac.
