= Aedh Dall Ua Conchobair =

Aedh Dall Ua Conchobair, Prince of Connacht, died 1194.

Aedh was the eldest child of King Tairrdelbach Ua Conchobair (1088–1156). His mother's identity is uncertain - Tairrdelbach had six wives - but his full brothers were Tadhg Alainn (died 1143 or 1144) and Abbot Máel Ísa of Roscommon (died 1223).

Despite his seniority, Aedh's half-brother, Conchobar Ua Conchobair was favoured by their father. In 1135, during a political low-point in Tairrdelbach's career, Aedh, in concert with his half-brother Ruaidrí, staged a rebellion.

Their attempt failed. Ruaidrí was protected by the Archbishop of Connacht, but Aedh, together with his confederate Uada Ua Con Ceanainn, was blinded by Conchobair, and Dairmait Ua Mail Ruanaid.

He died in 1194. He was the father or uncle of Tommaltach Ua Conchobair, Archbishop of Armagh 1180 to 1201.

== Annalistic references ==
- 1136. Aedh, son of Toirdhealbhach Ua Conchobhair was blinded by Toirdhealbhach himself.
- 1194.Hugh Dall (the Blind), the son of Turlough O'Conor, died. (from the Annals of the Four Masters)
- 1136. Aedh, son of Toirdhelbhach Ua Conchobhair, was blinded by his own brother. (from the Annals of Lough Cé
