= Aed mac Ruaidrí Ua Conchobair =

Aed mac Ruaidrí Ua Conchobair (died 1159) was Crown Prince of Connacht.

Aed was one of at least two sons of King Ruaidrí Ua Conchobair by different women. The Annals of Tigernach contain references to Aed's death, sub anno 1159:

Sluaiged la Ruaidhrí h-Úa Concobair co Condachtaib & co cath Tuadhmuman lais co h-Ath Luain. Tucsad Fir Teftha debaid doib iman ath, cor' buailedh righdamna Connacht and .i. Aedh mac Ruaidhrí, co n-erbailt de./A hosting by Ruaidri Ua Conchobair with the Connachtmen and a battalion of Thomond to Athlone. The men of Teffa (Tethbae) delivered battle to them at the ford, and the crown prince of Connacht, Aed, son of Ruaidri, received a blow there, of which he died.

A more detailed account is given towards the end of the same year, which states that Aed was killed by a single shot of a stone, on the wicker-work of the bridge of Athlone by a lad of the men of Teffa.

There are two, possibly three, sons of Ruaidri, known to have been called Aed or Aedh:

- Aed, Crown Prince, killed 1159.
- King Aedh mac Ruaidri Ó Conchobair, died 1233.
- Aedh Muimhnech, whose son, Conchobair, was alive in 1236.

Aedh Muimhneach may be identical with Crown Prince Aed, or yet another son.
