= Paddy Prendergast =

Paddy Prendergast may refer to:

- Paddy Prendergast (racehorse trainer) (1910–1980), Irish trainer
- Paddy Prendergast (Gaelic footballer) (1925-2021), Irish Gaelic footballer
- Paddy Prendergast (hurler) (born 1958), Irish retired hurler

== See also ==
- Patrick Prendergast (disambiguation)
