= Maghnus Ua Conchobair =

Prince of Connacht, died 1181

Maghnus Ua Conchobair, Prince of Connacht, died 1181.

== Family background ==
Maghnus was a son of King Tairrdelbach Ua Conchobair (1088-1156) and one of his six wives.

== Crich Coirpre ==
Maghnus and his brother, Brian Luighnech Ua Conchobhair, were killed at the battle of Crich Coirpre in County Sligo by King Flaithbertaigh of Tyrconnell. The battle occurred "on the Saturday before Whitsuntide", "Sixteen of the sons of the lords and chieftains of Connacht were slain by the Kinel Connell, as well as many others, both of the nobles and the plebeians".

As a result of this battle, "They (the Cenel Conaill) held the Connacians under subjection for a long time." Among the notable dead were two sons of Aed Ua Conchobair, Aed mac Conchobair Ua Cellaigh, Gilla Crist Ua Roduibh, Eachmarchach Ua Murray, a son of Mortough Ua Conchobair, "three of the O'Mulrenins; the two Mac Gillaboys; and Hugh, son of Hugh, who was the son of Roderic, together with many others of the nobility".

Brian Luighneach's son, Donogh, was also killed.

== Children and descendants ==
Maghnus's descendants were known as the Clann Maghnusa (LNG, pp. 398–99), which Jaski identifies as Mac Magnusa of Tir Tuathail (EIKS, p. 316). This would place them in County Roscommon. Today, some families named McManus, MacManus, McMannes, Mannus, Mannis and MacManners trace their heritage back to the sons of Maghnus. However, like many surnames in Ireland, other unrelated clans and clients also carried this name.

Magnus had the following known offspring:

- Muircheartach - alive 1230
- Diarmaid - His son Manus was killed in 1237. Another son, son Conchobair, was killed in 1279
- Domnall - A great-grandson, Teige, a man distinguished for his hospitality, was slain [in 1307) by Cathal, the son of Donnell, son of Teige O'Conor.
- Riocaird - In Leabhar na nGenealach, Dubhaltach MacFhirbhisigh states that a clann Riocaird is from Riocard s. Maghnus s. Toirdhealbhach Mor; from him it was first named, i.e., it was called Clann Riocaird, for it was by (?) and from that Clann Riocard that Meic Cathail Leithdheirg came. Riocaird does not appear in the annals.
