= Ruaidrí Ua Conchobair =

High King of Ireland (c. 1116 – 1198)

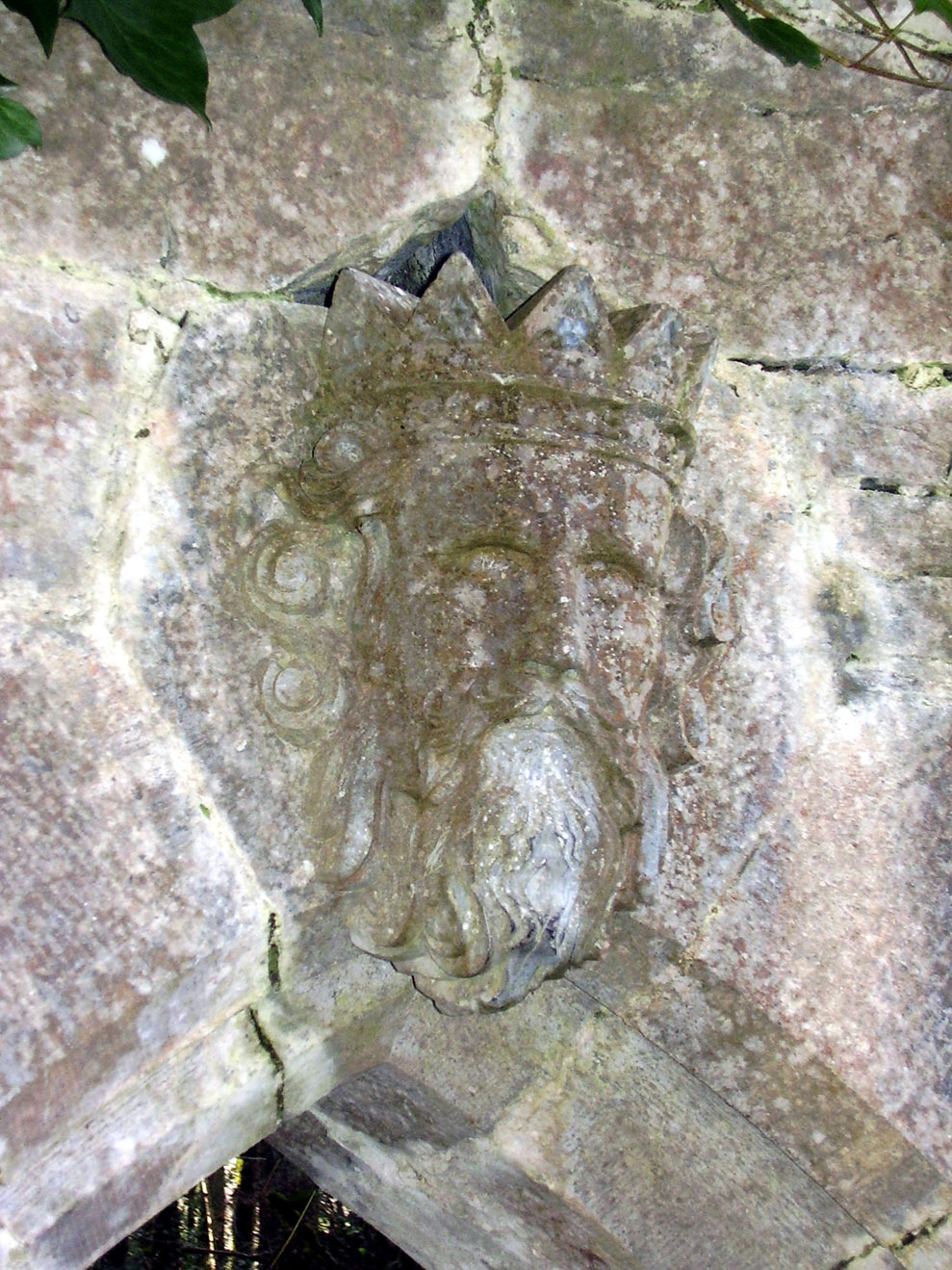
- Stone carving, Cong Abbey

High King of Ireland
- Reign: 1166–1198
- Predecessor: Muirchertach Mac Lochlainn
- Successor: Brian Ua Néill (disputed)
- Born: c. 1116; Tuam, Kingdom of Connacht
- Died: 2 December 1198; Galway, Kingdom of Connacht
- Burial: Clonmacnoise, County Offaly
- Spouse: Six (including Dubhchobhlaigh Ní Ruairc)
- Issue Detail: Conchobar Ua Conchobair; Muirchertach Ua Conchobair; Aedh mac Ruaidri Ó Conchobair; Domnall Mór Ua Conchobair; Rose Ní Conchobair
- Dynasty: O'Conor dynasty
- Father: Toirdelbach Ua Conchobair
- Mother: Caillech De Ní hEidhin
- Religion: Roman Catholicism

Ruaidrí mac Tairrdelbach Ua Conchobair (Modern Irish: Ruairí Ó Conchúir; anglicised as Rory O'Conor) (c. 1116 – 2 December 1198) was King of Connacht from 1156 to 1186, and High King of Ireland from 1166 to 1198. He was the last High King of Ireland before the Anglo-Norman invasion. (Note: Brian Ua Néill and Edward Bruce both claimed the title with opposition in later years but their claims were considered illegitimate.)

== Early life ==
Ruaidrí was one of over twenty sons of King Tairrdelbach Ua Conchobair (1088–1156). He and his sister Mór were Tairrdelbach's only children from his third wife, Cailech Dé Ní Eidin of Aidhne.

== Rigdamna Connachta ==
Ruaidrí was not a favourite of his father, his brother Conchobar Ua Conchobair being Tairrdelbach's tánaiste and designated heir. In 1136, he and his brother Aedh (died 1195) took advantage of a low in Tairrdelbach's fortunes to stage a rebellion. Aedh was blinded by Conchobar on Tairrdelbach's orders but Ruaidrí was protected by the Archbishop of Connacht, Muireadhach Ua Dubhthaigh. In 1143, he staged another rebellion. He was arrested by Conchobar and Tighearnán Ua Ruairc.

Ruaidhri, was taken by Toirdhealbhach Ua Conchobhair, in violation of laity and clergy, relics and protection. These were the sureties: Muireadhach Ua Dubhthaigh, with the clergy and laity of Connacht; Tadhg Ua Briain, lord of Thomond; Tighearnan Ua Ruairc, lord of Breifne; and Murchadh, son of Gilla-na-naemh Ua Fearghail, lord of Muintir-Anghaile. The clergy of Connacht, with Muireadhach Ua Dubhthaigh, fasted at Rath-Brenainn, to get their guarantee, but it was not observed for them.

After a year's imprisonment, Archbishop of Armagh Gilla Meic Liac mac Diarmata sought his release by April 1144, along with his confederates Domnall Ua Flaithbertaig and Cathal Ua Conchobair. However, Tairrdelbach only acquiesced upon the assassination of Conchobar in Mide, later that year.

== Tánaiste ==
Tairrdelbach now chose another son, Donnell Mor Mideach Ua Conchobair, as tánaiste, but Ruaidrí improved his status with raids against Tighearnán Ua Ruairc in 1146 and capturing and killing Tairrdelbach's nephew and opponent, Domnall Ua Conchobar, in 1150. Donnell Mór Mideach began to lose favour in 1147 and his fate was sealed when he was arrested in 1151, making solid Ruaidrí's claim as his father's heir. In that year, Ruaidrí successfully raided Thomond, where Tairrdelbach won a great victory at the Battle of Móin Mór.

== Dearbhforgaill's alleged abduction ==
In 1152, Muirchertach Mac Lochlainn travelled into Mide, compelling hostages of Tairrdelbach. "They divided Meath into two parts on this occasion; ... On this occasion Dearbhforgaill, daughter of Murchadh Ua Maeleachlainn, and wife of Tighearnan Ua Ruairc, was brought away by the King of Leinster" (Dermot MacMurrough). This account was written more than 500 years after the events took place. More contemporary accounts suggest that the 'abduction' may have been closer to an elopement where Dearbhforgaill abandoned her ageing husband for someone closer to her own age.

== Activity to 1156 ==
Ruaidrí remained active in suppressing the Ua Briains of Munster, burning Croome, dividing Munster in half (Thomond to Tadhg Ua Briain, Desmond to Diarmaid MacCartaigh), expelling Toirrdelbach mac Diarmata into Ailech. This gave reason for Mac Lochlainn to travel south with an army in 1153. Tairrdelbach was beaten off by Mac Lochlainn, leaving Ruaidrí and his men exposed at Fordruim, (now in County Westmeath):

Ruaidhri, son of Toirdhealbhach, and the battalion of West Connacht, and the recruits of Sil-Muireadhaigh, came to Fordruim; but as they were pitching their camp there, the heroes of the North poured upon them without previous notice, and numbers of the Connachtmen were slain by them, and among the rest Gillacheallaigh Ua hEidhin, lord of Aidhne, and his son, Aedh; Brian Ua Dubhda, lord of Ui-Fiachrach of the North; Muircheartach, son of Conchobhar (who was son of Toirdhealbhach) Ua Conchobhair; Domhnall Ua Birn; Domhnall, son of Cathal Ua Conchobhair; and Sitric Mac Dubhghaill.

The Ua Conchobairs brought "the fleets of Dun-Gaillmhe, of Conmhaicne-mara, of the men of Umhall, of Ui-Amhalghadha, and Ui-Fiachrach" north and defeated Mac Lochlainn at Inis Eoghain, but the latter was strong on land, forcing them to respond to incursions in east Connacht and Breifne, along with attempted settlements in Mide in 1155. The latter led to "The castle of Cuileanntrach [being] burned and demolished by Ruaidhri."

== King of Connacht ==
Tairrdelbach died at his capital of Dunmore, County Galway. Ruaidri became king of Connacht "without any opposition". As a precaution, he arrested three of his twenty-two brothers, "Brian Breifneach, Brian Luighneach, and Muircheartach Muimhneach" to prevent them from usurping him; Brian Breifneach was blinded.

On learning of Tairrdelbach's death, Mac Lochlainn assumed the High Kingship and began a war of attrition in Leinster and Osraige, using their regional allies against one another.

Over the winter of 1156–57, he positioned a fleet on the River Shannon in anticipation of an attack from Aileach. Yet Mac Lochlainn successfully imposed his own client king in Mide, took hostages from Dermot MacMurrough, evicted the kings of Loígis, Uí Failghe and Osraige, all of whom fled to Connacht. He then subdued all Munster and captured Luimneach. Forced to attack or lose face, Ruaidrí responded by plundering and burning areas around Strabane and Derry. Then, while Mac Lochlainn was returning home to counter him, Ruaidrí entered Munster and overturned Mac Lochlainn's political settlement.

== High King of Ireland ==
After the death of Mac Lochlainn in 1166, Ruaidrí rode to Dublin where he was inaugurated as High King of Ireland, arguably the first without opposition. He then celebrated Óenach Tailten, a recognised prerogative of the High Kings, in which he made a number of charitable donations and gifts.

One of Ruaidrí's first acts as King was to invade Leinster and expel its king, Dermot Mac Morrough. He then received hostages from all the major lordships and kings of Ireland to show their submission. However, his power base was still in his home province of Connacht. Dublin was under the rule of Ascaill mac Ragnaill who had submitted to Ruaidrí.

Ruaidrí's position in Ireland remained strong until the Norman invasion of Ireland, who had come to aid Dermot mac Morrough regain his throne as king of Leinster. Ruaidrí experienced mixed success fighting the Norman and their rebellious Irish allies, losing much of Leinster, along with the Norse-Gael cities of Waterford and Wexford.

He was, however, able to unite much of the Irish military forces, something not seen since the days of Brian Boru. He allegedly led a massive army of sixty thousand men and a fleet of 30 ships during a campaign to retake the land they had lost to the Normans, in particular Dublin. He drove the Normans out of Kildare and Meath, burning Norman castles at Trim and Kells. This led to the siege of Dublin in 1171. However, the King was defeated after the Normans sallied out to Ruaidrí's camp and killed many of the Irish soldiers as they were resting and bathing. After this defeat, Ruaidrí's army withdrew.

This army was part of a massive counter-offensive led by the High King which pushed the Normans out of the Midlands and towards Dublin and the east coast. Despite the defeat at Dublin, Ruaidrí managed to keep control of the Midlands.

The Normans managed to conquer northern and southern Leinster, and parts of eastern Munster. However, this was arguably the limit of their expansion during Ruaidrí's reign. A Norman expedition into Munster was wiped out by Ruaidrí at the Battle of Thurles, while the northern kings of Oriel and Northern Uí Néill repelled attacks on their kingdoms and raided and plundered much of northern Leinster.

He signed the Treaty of Windsor with King Henry II of England. Whether he was unable or unwilling to, Henry did not or could not control the Norman barons, who continued conquering Irish territory, while Ruaidrí could not control the lesser Irish kings. This led to further conflict which would continue for centuries. Ruaidrí abdicated in 1183, but returned to rule briefly twice after that. Ruaidrí died in the year 1198. He would be the last Gaelic king of Ireland, except for perhaps Brian Ua Néill (died 1260).

== Children and descendants ==
The last of Ruaidrí's descendants to hold the kingship of Connacht, Aedh mac Ruaidri Ua Conchobair, died in 1233. The Annals of Connacht give the following reason for this:

Aed mac Ruaidri had been five years King of Connacht, as the poet said: "Aed mac Ruaidri of the swift onslaught, five years his rule over the province, till he fell—a loss on every frontier—by the hand of Fedlimid." Here ends the rule of the children of Ruaidri O Conchobair, King of Ireland. For the Pope offered him the title to [the kingship of] Ireland for himself and his seed for ever, and likewise six wives, if he would renounce the sin of adultery henceforth; and since he would not accept these terms God took the rule and sovranty from his seed for ever, in punishment for his sin.

The annals and genealogies list thirteen children fathered by Ruaidrí. There may have been more.

- Conchobar Ua Conchobair
- Muirchertach Ua Conchobair
- Aedh Muimhnech Ua Conchobair. Had a son, Conchobar, alive in 1236.
- Domnall Mór Ua Conchobair. Had a son, Niall, killed in 1242.
- Aed mac Ruaidrí Ua Conchobair, died 1159.
- The daughter of Ruaidrí Ua Conchobair, wife of [F]laithbertach Ua Maeldoraidh, was killed by the sons of Ua Cairella[i]n in 1176.
- Rose Ní Conchobair, married Hugh de Lacy, Lord of Meath about 1180, and had descendants.
- Conchobar Máenmaige Ua Conchobhair, died 1189.
- Diarmait mac Ruaidrí Ó Conchobair, died 1221. Had sons Diarmait (fl. 1237), Donnchad (fl. 1237), Muirchertach (k. 1237) and Cormac.
- Muirghis Cananach Ua Conchobhair, died 1224.
- Nuala Ní Conchobair, died 1226.
- Aedh mac Ruaidri Ó Conchobair, died 1233.
- Toirdhealbhach mac Ruaidhrí Ó Conchobhair, died 1239. Had sons Conchobar Buide and Brian.
- M1211.8. Raghnailt and Caillech De, two daughters of Roderic O'Conor, died.

All of Ruaidrí's large number of male progeny faded into obscurity in the first half of the 13th century. The last to be mentioned in the Gaelic-Irish annals was his grandson, Niall son of Domnall Mór, who was killed in 1242.

The result is that there are no demonstratable male-line descendants of Ireland's last high-king recorded after the 1240s. All kings of Connacht from 1233 descended from Ruaidrí's much younger brother, Cathal Crobhdearg Ua Conchobair. The Ó Conchubhair Donn, the senior member of the entire Síol Muireadaigh dynasty, likewise descends from Cathal Crobhdearg.

Only two of Ruaidrí's descendants have ever attempted to claim the Irish High Kingship:

- Brian Ua Néill from 1258 to 1260
- Edward Bruce from 1315 to 1318

== Footnotes ==
Regnal titles
Preceded by Toirdhealbhach Ua Conchobhair	King of Connacht; 1156–1183; 1186	Succeeded by Conchobar Maenmaige Ua Conchobhair
Preceded by Muirchertach MacLochlainn	High King of Ireland; 1166–1198	Succeeded by Brian Ua Néill
New title	King of Ireland; 1166–1198	Vacant Title next held by Henry VIII in 1542
