= Tairrdelbach Ua Conchobair =

Toirdhealbhach Ua Conchobair
- King of Connacht; High King of Ireland

High Kings of Ireland
- Reign: 1119–1156
- Predecessor: Muircheartach Ua Briain
- Successor: Muircheartach Mac Lochlainn
- Burial: Clonmacnoise
- Spouse: 6 known
- Issue: 26
- Dynasty: O'Conor
- Father: Ruaidrí na Saide Buide
- Mother: Mór Ua Briain

Toirdhealbhach Mór Ua Conchobhair (old spelling: Tairrdelbach Mór Ua Conchobair; 1088 – 1156) anglicised Turlough Mór O'Conor, was King of Connacht (1106–1156) and High King of Ireland (ca. 1120–1156).

== Family background and early life ==
Toirdelbhach was born in the year 1088. He was the youngest son of Ruaidrí na Saide Buide (died 1118), and his mother was Mór, daughter of Toirdelbach Ua Briain (1009–14 July 1086). Therefore, through his mother, his great-great-grandfather was Brian Boru. His brothers were Niall (killed 1093), Tadc (killed 1097), Conchobar (murdered 1103), and Domnall, King of Connacht (deposed 1106). There was at least one sister, Dubhchobhlaigh Bean Ua hEaghra of Luighne Connacht (died 1131). Ruaidrí was married to four or more women.

According to the Annals of Tigernach, Toirdelbach's mother died the year he was born, suggesting his birth may have been arduous. In 1092, King Ruaidrí was blinded by Flaithbertaigh Ua Flaithbertaigh, an incident which led to the domination of Connacht by the Dál gCais of Munster, led by Tairrdelbach's uncle, the brother of Tairrdelbach's mother, Muirchertach Ua Briain, High King of Ireland, who possibly took Tairrdelbach into his household to groom him for the day when he would be king of Connacht. (p. 471, MIAE 2005)

However this would not occur until 1106; until then, Connacht endured a prolonged period of civil strife between different factions of the Uí Conchobair, Uí Ruairc of Bréifne as well as more minor families of the Uí Briúin and Síol Muireadaigh, including the long-displaced Ui Fiachrach Aidhne. Tairrdelbach's brothers Tadc and Domnall both gained the kingship at different times, but depended upon the support of Muircherteach Ua Briain.

== Early reign ==
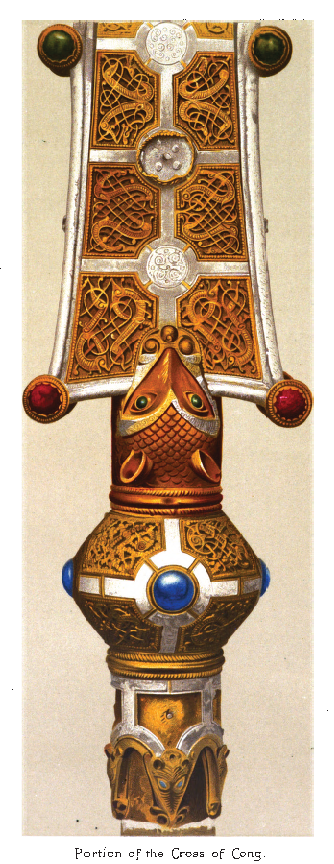
The Cross of Cong, a reliquary and processional cross that contains a piece of the True Cross, was commissioned by Toirdelbach and made at Roscommon.

In 1106, with the support of his uncle Muirchertach Ua Briain, eighteen-year-old Tairrdelbach deprived his older brother Domnall of the kingship of Connacht.

"Tairrdelbach carefully maintained his alliance with Ua Briain, sending troops to aid the High King against the Ui Ruaric of Bréifne in 1109. But he was also determined to defend his kingdom against predators such as Domnall Mac Lochlainn of the Uí Néill (d. 1121), king of the north of Ireland."

In 1110, Mac Lochlainn raided Connacht, carrying off herds of cattle and captives. While this raid rattled Toirdelbach, he demonstrated that he was not weak by attacking the Conmaicne and Breifne, with mixed fortunes; he defeated the former at Mag Na, but his army was defeated by the men of Breifne at Mag Brenair. He attacked the Northern Uí Néill the next year in 1111, plundering Termonn Dabeoc in Tír Chonaill and ravaging modern County Fermanagh as far as Lough Erne.

Domnall, Toirdelbach's brother who he had taken the Kingship of Connacht from would remain in Connacht, however, and contested Toirdelbach's claim to the throne of the Kingdom, but he was finally expelled southward to Munster by Toirdelbhach several years later in 1114. A year later in 1115, an attempt to assassinate him was made by some of his nobles who were discontent with his rule at Ath Bo, but they were unsuccessful.

Although much of his time and resources during his early reign were spent in Munster, he was also involved in campaigns elsewhere. In 1115, his wife Orlaith of the Kingdom of Meath died, ending the alliance between Toirdelbach and Murchad Ia Mael Sechnaill, King of Meath. Toirdelbach defeated their forces on both land and on the River Shannon, gaining the submission of Meath. He later married Connacht noblewoman Cailleach De, daughter of Ua hEidin, who was the mother of future High King Ruaidrí Ua Conchobair, Toirdelbach's son. At the end of 1115, he bestowed gifts upon the church at the monastery at Clonmacaoise, including a drinking horn and chalice.

A tactic Toirdelbhach used throughout his career in politics and as High King was divide and rule. This can be seen in several instances, most notably the partition of Munster, which at the time, under the rule of the Ua Briain (O'Brien dynasty) was the most powerful kingdom in Ireland and had controlled the High Kingship for over a century, since the death of Brian Boru.

== Partition and war in Munster ==
In 1114, Toirdelbhach took advantage of political turmoil in the Kingdom of Munster, which at the time was ruled by his uncle, Muircherteach Ua Briain, King of Munster and High King of Ireland, who had previously often supported Toirdelbach as he reigned in Connacht and was the one who backed him to take the Kingship from his brother, had become "sick to the point of a living Skeleton". It was at this point that Diarmuid, brother of Muircherteach, took the Kingship and banished Muircherteach.

Tairrdelbach had been scheming against Munster with Muircherteach's enemies, mainly Domnall mac Lochlainn in Ulster and Murchad Ua Máel Sechnaill of the Kingdom of Meath to his east, and they supported Diarmuit's claim to the throne, but Diarmuit soon rose in rebellion against Toirdelbhach. In response, Toirdelbach attacked Munster, ravaging Thomond and expelling Diarmuit.

A year later in 1115, Muircherteach Ia Briain regained his strength and led campaigns against his brother to regain the Kingship, with backing from Toirdelbach and other powerful kings, in an attempt to restore order in the province. However, this war would remain a stalemate for several years, and allowed others both within and outside the Kingdom to scheme and form their own plans against Munster. In 1118, Muircherteach and, with backing from Toirdelbach, Ua Máel Sechnaill, and Aéd Ua Ruairc of the Kingdom of Breifne, attacked Tadgh Mac Carthaigh of the MacCarthy Mór dynasty.

But they turned against Muircherteach at Glanmire in County Cork, allying with the MacCarthys to remove the High King from power once and for all. At the same time, Toirdelbach's forces attacked Leinster, Osraige and Dublin, which were still held by the Ua Briain's, removing Domnall Ua Briain as governor of Dublin, and forcing the forces of the three kingdoms to join Toirdelbach in his campaigns against Munster. Toirdelbach even went as far as destroying the Ua Briain palace at Kincora, Killaloe.

Meanwhile, in southwest Munster, in modern Counties Cork and Kerry, the Mac Carthaigh (MacCarthys), another royal dynasty of Munster who had been living under the rule of the Ua Briain rebelled. Toirdelbach, eager to further destabilize Munster, backed this revolt. Toirdelbach then resolved the issue he had created by partitioning Munster in 1118. The province was partitioned into the Kingdoms of Thomond, under the rule of the Ua Briain Dynasty, the Kingdom of Desmond, under the rule of the Mac Carthaigh Mór Dynasty, and finally the short-lived Kingdom of Osraige, under the rule of the Kennedy Dynasty, though the latter kingdom was small in comparison to the other two and were rarely involved in the politics or struggles for the Kingship of Munster.

But it was around this point that Muircherteach finally managed to successfully topple his brother Diarmuid from power and retook the Kingship, however, he was now only King of Thomond, not the whole of Munster. He would die a year later in 1119 at Lismore. Toirdelbach had successfully divided Munster, and a year later he annexed the Ua Briain homeland of County Clare into the Kingdom of Connacht, leading to the further decline of the Ua Briain dynasty.

Toirdelbach had now defeated and partitioned the Kingdom of Munster, gained the submission of several other kings, and notably ended the Ua Briain's hold of the High Kingship which had lasted since 1002. In 1120 he celebrated the Oneach Titleann, an event meant to signify one's holding of the High Kingship of Ireland. However, this attracted the attention of Domnall mac Lochlainn of Ulster. The two kings met at Athlone where they agreed to a "false peace". Although Mac Lochlainn remained a threat to Toirdelbach he died in 1121, leaving Toirdelbach the most powerful man in Ireland. He immediately subdued unrest in Munster, causing the "people to cry aloud".

== Innovation and political strategies ==
Toirdelbhach spent much of his career modernising and improving various aspects of Ireland, particularly in his home province of Connacht. Tairrdelbach constructed Dún Gaillimhe in 1124, for use as a fort and naval base, from which the King's fleets could attack all along the west coast of Ireland. A small settlement grew up around this fort and eventually this developed into Galway city. Although the town was destroyed or burned many times over the next few centuries it continued to grow into a prosperous city.

He also created a new supply of water for settlements in eastern Connacht when he constructed a six-mile-long canal which redirected the River Suck around a castle and towards nearby towns and villages. The route of this damn probably began near the modern town of Ballinasloe which was built on the river later.

A political strategy often utilised successfully by Toirdelbhach was the appointment of relatives or loyal nobles as rulers or governors of towns, cities and other lesser regions or kingdoms. This allowed him to keep control of every area in the country and avoid rebellions or alliances against him.

This can be seen in 1126 when Toirdelbhach appointed one of his sons, Conchobhair, as king of Laigin (Leinster) and the city-state of Dublin. Toirdelbhach realized the political and military importance of Dublin as the city had become more or less the capital of the country. It was also one of the main trading ports of the country. Therefore, control of Dublin was crucial to a successful High Kingship of Ireland. Conchobhair would also be given the Kingship of the province of Mide (Meath) later in 1143, however, this move would backfire when he was assassinated a year later.

In the year 1129, Toirdelbach reputedly built the first stone castle in Ireland, on the River Shannon in Athlone. Toirdelbach would build several more of these throughout Connacht, notably in Dún Gallimhe, Dún Mór and Ballinasloe, strengthening the defences of the province. Athlone was a strategic location as it guarded one of the few crossings over the Shannon and guarded the area against any invasions via ships sailing up or down the river, especially from Munster whom Toirdelbhach was involved in an ongoing war with at the time.

Toirdelbach was also known to have constructed or rebuilt several churches, cathedrals and monasteries, notably the Cong Abbey. This increased his power as he would often have the Catholic Church on his side in any political or military conflicts later in his career which was crucial given to the importance of religion in Ireland at the time, though notably, the church protected the King's son Ruadhrí from Toirdelbach after failed rebellions against him in both 1136 and 1143.

The Cross of Cong, made at the behest of Tairrdelbach was designed to be placed on top of a religious staff or crosier. It was made for the Cathedral church at Tuam. The cross was subsequently moved to Cong Abbey. He is also believed to have refounded Cong Abbey ca. 1135.

Tairrdelbach's successful and innovative reign as High King of Ireland has been summed up as follows:

"[he] was fifty years King of Connacht, one of the longest reigns of any European monarch. He dominated Irish politics .. leading armies and navies all over Éire ... subjugating entire kingdoms. A superb military commander by any standards, his victory at Móin Mór in 1151 was among the most decisive in Irish history, inflicting 7000 enemy casualties ... An innovative tyrant, his creation of castles was novel in Éire ... as was his apparent wish to introduce male primogeniture ... Commercial and political networks connected him with fellow-rulers in Britain, Francia, and Scandinavia. He reorganised lordships and kingdoms as suited him, carving out a well-defended personal domain within Connacht, an imperium that he would have span all Éire. Dún Mór was its caput, Tuaim Dá Ghualann the seat of its archbishop, and Dún Gaillimhe its main port – military and merchant. Quite an achievement for what is perceived as the 'timeless' western 'fringe' of twelfth-century Europe, but was a dynamic society ruled as aggressively as those in 'feudal' Europe." (Martyn, 2016, p. 35)

== Rebellion and heirs ==
Since Toirdelbach's accession to the High Kingship, his long-designated heir had been Conchobar Ua Conchobair, who was Toirdelbach's Tánaiste, and whom he had appointed as his governor of the Kingdom of Laigin (Leinster) and city–state of Dublin within it, and later the province and kingdom of Mide.

However, many of Toirdelbach's twenty other sons were very discontented with this situation. Two of them, Ruadhrí and Aedh, staged a rebellion against Toirdelbach in 1136 at a low point in the High King's fortunes. They were defeated by Toirdelbhach and Aedh was captured and blinded– however, Ruadhrí escaped punishment by fleeing to an Archbishop, who protected him from the King.

As Toirdelbach did not want any tension between himself and the Catholic church in Ireland, eventually the family briefly reconciled before Ruadhrí again rebelled against his father in the year 1143, and was defeated yet again. This time, he was captured and imprisoned by Toirdelbhach, however, the archbishop again intervened by preventing the King from punishing Ruadhrí. Ruadhrí was released after a year in prison.

However, it was at this point, in the year 1144, that Conchobar, the heir to the throne, was assassinated while governing the kingdom of Mide. He was killed by a Meath lord or noble who had deemed him unfit or unworthy to govern the province. Toirdelbach did not make the same mistake twice or risk the life of another of his sons and instead divided the kingdom of Meath between three kings loyal to him; modern County Westmeath was given to the Northern Uí Néill, and 'East Meath' was divided between the Ua Ruaircs of Breifne (modern counties Leitrim and Cavan) and the third are was given to the King of Leinster.

Toirdelbhach selected another son, Domhnall Mór mac Tairrdelbach, to be his Tánaiste and heir to the throne of Connacht and Ireland. Ruadhrí however, attempted a new approach in securing the Kingship by instead attempting to gain his father's favour. He conducted raids against the Ua Ruaircs (O'Rourkes) in the late 1140s, and was also involved in the capture of one of Toirdelbach nephews who was rebelling against him. He was also involved in raids against the O'Briens of Thomond in the prelude to the battle of Mhóin Mór.

Meanwhile, Domhnall Mór was beginning to fall out of favour with Toirdelbach and his fate was sealed later when he was arrested. This secured Ruadhrí's position as sole heir to the throne. Ruadhrí became the Tánaiste and succeeded Toirdelbach as king following his death.

== Later reign and battles ==
Battle of Móin Mór

Despite giving hostages to Muirchertach Mac Lochlainn in 1150, and thereby ceasing to be King of Ireland, Tairrdelbach was still capable of active overlordship in southern Ireland. In 1151 he and his allies – King Diarmaid Mac Murchadha of Leinster, Maelseachlainn son of Murchadh Ó Maelseachlainn of the Kingdom of Mide, King Tighearnán Ó Ruairc of the Kingdom of Breifne – met the forces of King Toirdhealbhach Ó Briain of Thomond at Móin Mór near Glanmire.

In what was one of the most decisive battles ever fought in Ireland, Tairrdelbach defeated the forces of Toirdelbach Ó Briain, killing "7000" enemy soldiers. The Annals of Tigernach describe the battle and victory of Toirdelbach Ua Conchobhair here:

"Until sand of sea and stars of heaven are numbered, no one will reckon all the sons of the kings and chiefs and great lords of the men of Munster that were killed there, so that of the three battalions of Munster that had come thither, none escaped save only one shattered battalion."

This event, along with the partition of Munster earlier in Toirdelbach's reign, practically destroyed the power of the Ua Briain dynasty in Munster, and secured Tairrdelbach as the undisputed High King of Ireland and as overlord of Munster and Connacht. Toirdelbach's military forces and his excellent capabilities as a commander were a crucial aspect of his success as High King, similar to the reign of his great‐grandfather, King Brian Boru.

Naval battle off Inishowen

In the year 1156, Toirdelbhach organised a massive fleet gathered from all over western Connacht including men and ships from Dún Gaillimhe, Clew Bay on the coast of County Mayo (likely the seafaring Uí Mháille (O'Malley) clan and Connemara in western County Galway among others. The fleet was commanded by one of Toirdelbach's admirals, as by now the High King himself was almost seventy years of age. This fleet sailed north to plunder the lands of the O'Donnell Dynasty in Tír Chonaill (County Donegal) which was then part of the Northern Uí Néill, and went as far north as Inis Eoin (the Inishowen Peninsula).

The Northern Uí Néill were alarmed by these attacks on the province of Ulster and decided to take action to assist the O'Donnells. Muircherteach Mac Lochlainn (who would later succeed Toirdelbach as High King of Ireland), who was a member of the Cenel Eoghain branch of the Ui Néill Dynasty, decided to request the assistance of the Viking Norse-Gaels who inhabited the Norse Kingdom of the Isles in the modern Hebrides and Western Isles of Scotland.

The Norse-Gaels were excellent sailors and possessed a large and advanced naval force. Mac Lochlainn sent a representative to request assistance in defeating Toirdelbach's fleet, which was granted. The Vikings, under the command of a man by the name of Mac Scelling, sailed from western Scotland and the two fleets met in a battle off the peninsula of Inishowen.

According to the Annals of the Four Masters, the battle lasted all day from the morning until late in the evening. The Annals state that the battle was "fiercely and spiritedly" fought and that there was a "great slaughter" and a great number of the High King's sailors were killed. However, the Irish fleet prevailed and the Norse-Gaels were slaughtered. Many of them abandoned ship and were subsequently captured by the Irish fleet. The Norse commander, Mac Scelling, apparently lost his teeth in the battle, but survived. However, the heavy casualties suffered by the High Kings forces appear to have severely weakened his power in the north and allow Mac Lochlainn to put more pressure on Ua Conchobhair in his ambition to secure the High Kingship.

== Death and legacy ==
Toirdelbach Ua Conchobhair died in the year 1156. His reign had lasted 50 years, one of the longest in Ireland and Europe up to that point in history. He was succeeded as King of Connacht by his son Ruadhrí mac Tairrdelbach Ua Conchobhair, who had previously been his Tánaiste.

He was succeeded as High King of Ireland by Muircherteach mac Lochlainn of the Northern Uí Néill, who would reign for ten years before being assassinated by his own nobles in the year 1166.

He was initially interred at the Cong Abbey, the very monastery he had rebuilt earlier in his reign. However he was later buried in Clonmacaoise, where many members of the ruling Ua Conchobhair royal bloodline would be buried. Toirdelbach's reforms, advances and military prowess in Ireland would be remembered for many years as arguably the greatest King of Ireland since the reign of his great-great-grandfather Brian Boru.

One of Toirdelbach's twenty sons, Ruadhrí, would become High King of Ireland following the death of Muircherteach mac Lochlainn, despite him rebelling against his father earlier in his life. He became High King of Ireland completely unopposed in the year 1166, and was crowned in Dublin. He would enjoy a period of relative peace in his High Kingship during the period of 1166–1169, however, Ireland would again be thrown into conflict when the Anglo–Norman invasion of Ireland occurred in 1169. This would begin eight hundred years of conflict and political tension with England and later, Britain.

== Wives and children ==
Tairrdelbach had the following known wives:

- Caillech Dé Ní Eidin
- Órfhlaith Ní Mailshechlainn, died 1115
- Mór Ní Lochlainn, died 1122
- Tailltiu Ní Mailshechlainn, sister of Órfhlaith, died 1127
- Derbforgaill Ní Lochlainn, died 1151.
- Dubhcobhlach Ní Maíl Ruanaid, died 1168.

Dubhaltach Mac Fhirbhisigh, writing in 1649, wrote the following account of Tairrdelbach's family (219.16 – 220.13, pp. 486–489):

" Toirdhealbhach Mor s. Ruaidhri, high-king of Ireland, had many sons; Ruaidhri, king of Ireland also, Cathal Croibhdhearg, king of Connacht, Domhnall Mor, tainst of Connacht (to him was finally granted the hundredfold increase) were his three sons by his wife; Maol Iosa, coarb of Coman, was the eldest of his family (and his heir), and Aodh Dall and Tadhg Alainn and Brian Breifneach and Brian Luighneach, Maghnus and Lochlainn, Muircheartach Muimneach, Donnchadh, Maol Seachlainn, Tadhg of Fiodhnacha, Cathal Mioghran, two [sons named] Conchabhar, Diarmaid, Domhnall, Muirgheas, Tadhg of Dairean, Murchadh Fionn."

1. – Conchobar Ua Conchobair, fl. 1126–1144
2. – unnamed daughter, wife of Murchadh Ua hEaghra, murdered 1134
3. – Aedh Dall Ua Conchobair, fl. 1136–1194
4. – Ruaidrí Ua Conchobair, fl. 1136–1198
5. – Tadhg Alainn Ua Conchobair, died 1143/1144
6. – Cathal Migarán Ua Conchobair, died 1151 or 1152
7. – Cathal Crobdearg Ua Conchobair, 1152–1224
8. – Donnell Mor Mideach Ua Conchobair, died 1176
9. – Brian Breifneach Ua Conchobair, fl. 1156
10. – Brian Luighnech Ua Conchobhair, fl. 1156–1181
11. – Maghnus Ua Conchobair, died 1181
12. – Mór Ní Conchobair, died 1190
13. – Muirchertach Muimhnech Ua Conchobair, died 1210
14. – Máel Ísa, Abbot of Roscommon, died 1223
15. – Muirgheas the Canon, died 1224
16. – Aedh
17. – Maghnus
18. – Lochlann
19. – Donchadh
20. – Maol Seachlainn
21. – Tadhg Fiodhnacha
22. – Conchobair
23. – Diarmaid
24. – Tadhg Dairean
25. – Murchadh Finn
26. – Uran

Via his son, Brian Luighnech O Conchobhair, descended the dynasty of the Ó Conchobhair Sligigh, and from Cathal Crobdearg Ua Conchobair both the O Conchobhair Ruadh and the Ó Conchubhair Donn.

== Family tree ==
Uí Conchobair, Kings of Connacht.	Dal gCais, Kings of Munster.
Aed in Gai Bernaig (d. 1067)	Toirdelbach Ua Briain (1009–1086)
Ruaidrí na Saide Buide Ua Conchobair (d. 1118)	Mór (d. 1088)	Tadc (d. 1086)	Diarmait (1060–1118)	Muirchertach (d. 1119)
Niall (d. 1093)	Tadc	Conchobar (d. 1103)	Domnall	Dubhchobhlaigh (d. 1131)	Tairrdelbach, 1088–1156.	Toirrdelbach	Conchobar	Tadg Glae	Donnchad
Cathal	Aed	Domnall Kings of Connacht.	Kings of Munster and Thomond.
Domnall (d. 1153.)	Ruaidri (d. 1151.)

Preceded by Domnall Ua Conchobair	King of Connacht; 1106–1156	Succeeded by Ruaidri Ua Conchobair
Preceded by Muircheartach Ua Briain	High King of Ireland; 1119–1156	Succeeded by Muirchertach Mac Lochlainn
