= Cross of Cong =

12th-century Irish Christian cross

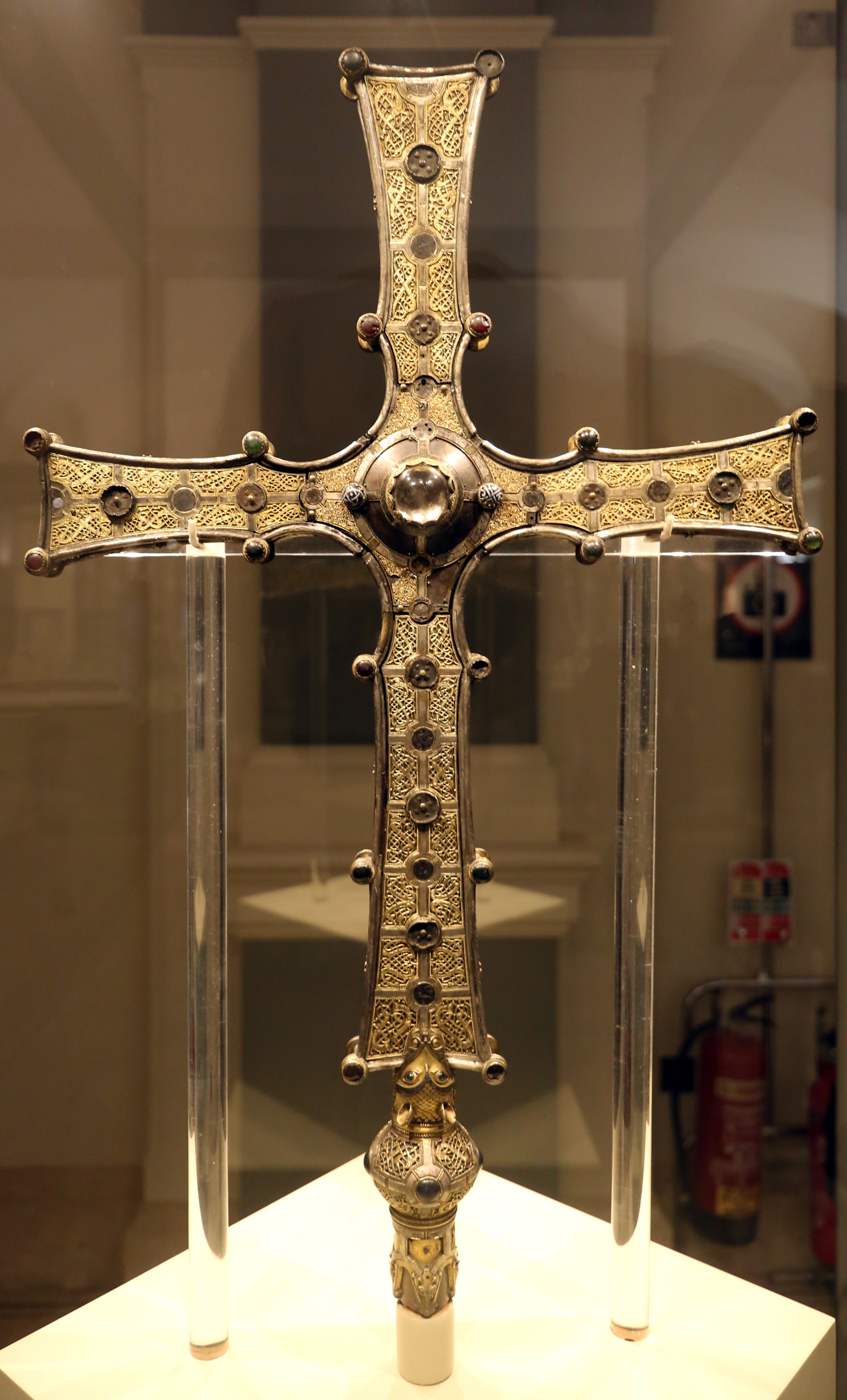
- The Cross of Cong
- Material: Various (incl. gold, silver, niello & copper).
- Created: High Middle Ages (c. 1123 – 1127 AD)
- Present location: National Museum of Ireland, Dublin

The Cross of Cong (Irish: Cros Chonga, "the yellow baculum") is an early 12th-century Irish Christian ornamented cusped processional cross, which was, as an inscription says, made for Tairrdelbach Ua Conchobair (d. 1156), King of Connacht and High King of Ireland to donate to the Cathedral church of the period that was located at Tuam, County Galway, Ireland. The cross was subsequently moved to Cong Abbey at Cong, County Mayo, from which it takes its name.

Designed to be placed on top of a staff, it embeds a reliquary which originally held a purported piece of the True Cross. This gave it additional importance as an object of reverence and was undoubtedly the reason for the object's elaborate beauty.

The cross is displayed at the National Museum of Ireland, Dublin, having previously been in the Museum of the Royal Irish Academy, Dublin. It is considered one of finest examples of metalwork and decorative art of its period in Western Europe.

== Description ==
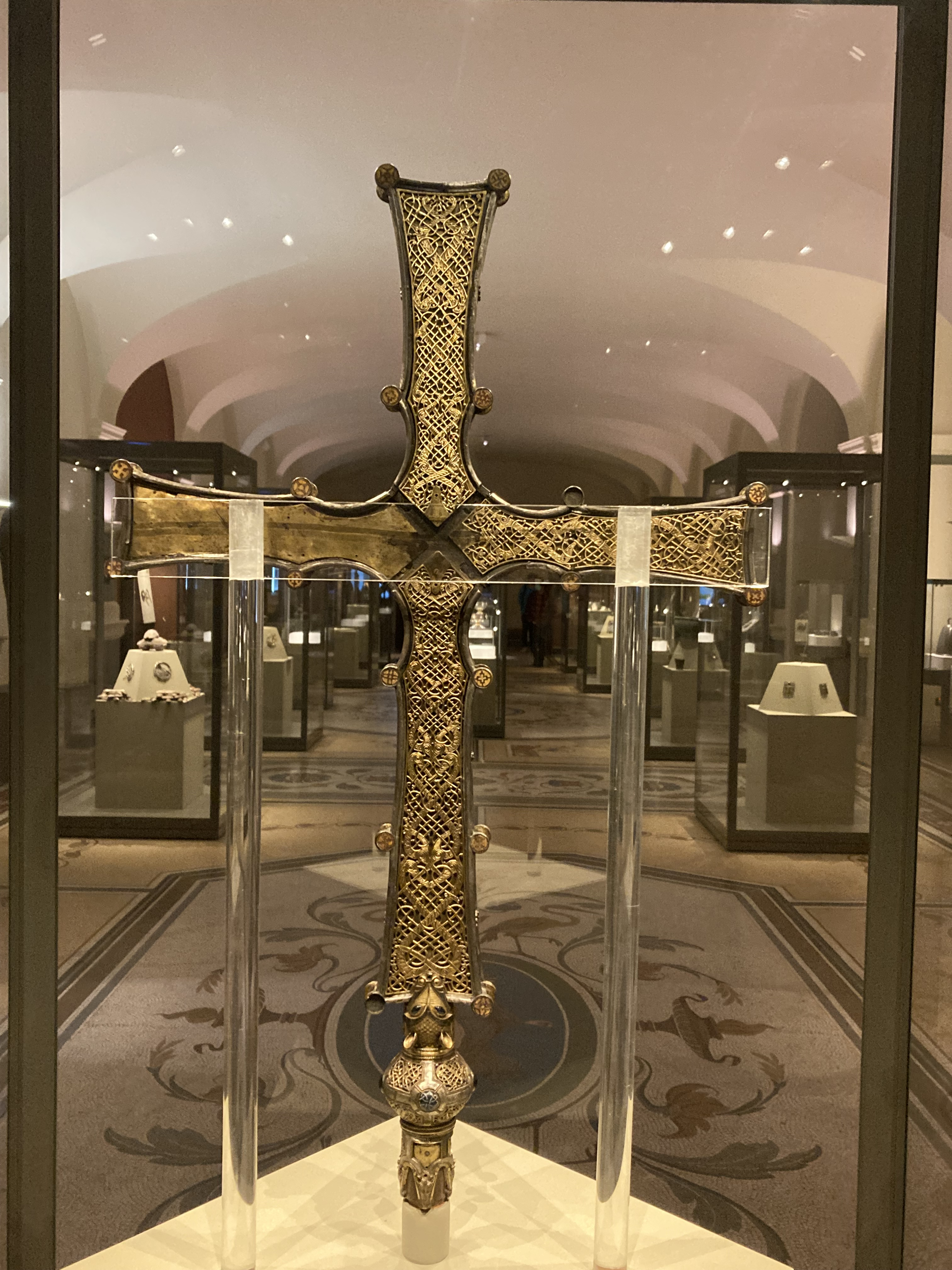
Reverse side of the cross

The Cross of Cong consists of an oak cross, covered in gold, silver, niello, copper, bronze, brass, enamel, coloured glass, and other ornamentation. In addition to traditional Irish design features from Insular art, the cross also displays some Viking and Romanesque influences, including 'strapwork' decoration in the Urnes style. It has been suggested that the older Insular stylistic elements may be deliberate revivalism. The decoration includes minute golden filigree work in an intertwined pattern called on front and back. From the base heads of beasts on each side grip the cross in their mouth, a feature also found in German crosses. The overall shape of the cross was thought to be Romanesque, but recent discoveries have shown very similar shapes in much earlier Irish pieces. Some of the original precious stones and glass pieces that studded the cross are now missing.

There is a large polished piece of rock crystal in the centre of the cross. Under this was placed the relic (sent from Rome around the year A.D. 1123) of what at the time was believed to be the True Cross. The relic is since lost, and was a small fragment of wood only. The crystal is semi-transparent, once enabling the relic to be partially seen by the viewer.

The cross is 30 inches (76 cm) high and the arms are 18.75 inches (47.6 cm) in breadth.

As a processional cross, the cross was carried mounted on its staff at the head of a religious procession by one of the officiating clergy or altar-servers. Often such crosses were then removed from their staff and placed on the altar during the ceremony.

The reincarnation of centuries-old Irish metalworking techniques, such as the juxtaposition of red and yellow enamel, is seen on the Cross of Cong and Manchan shrine.

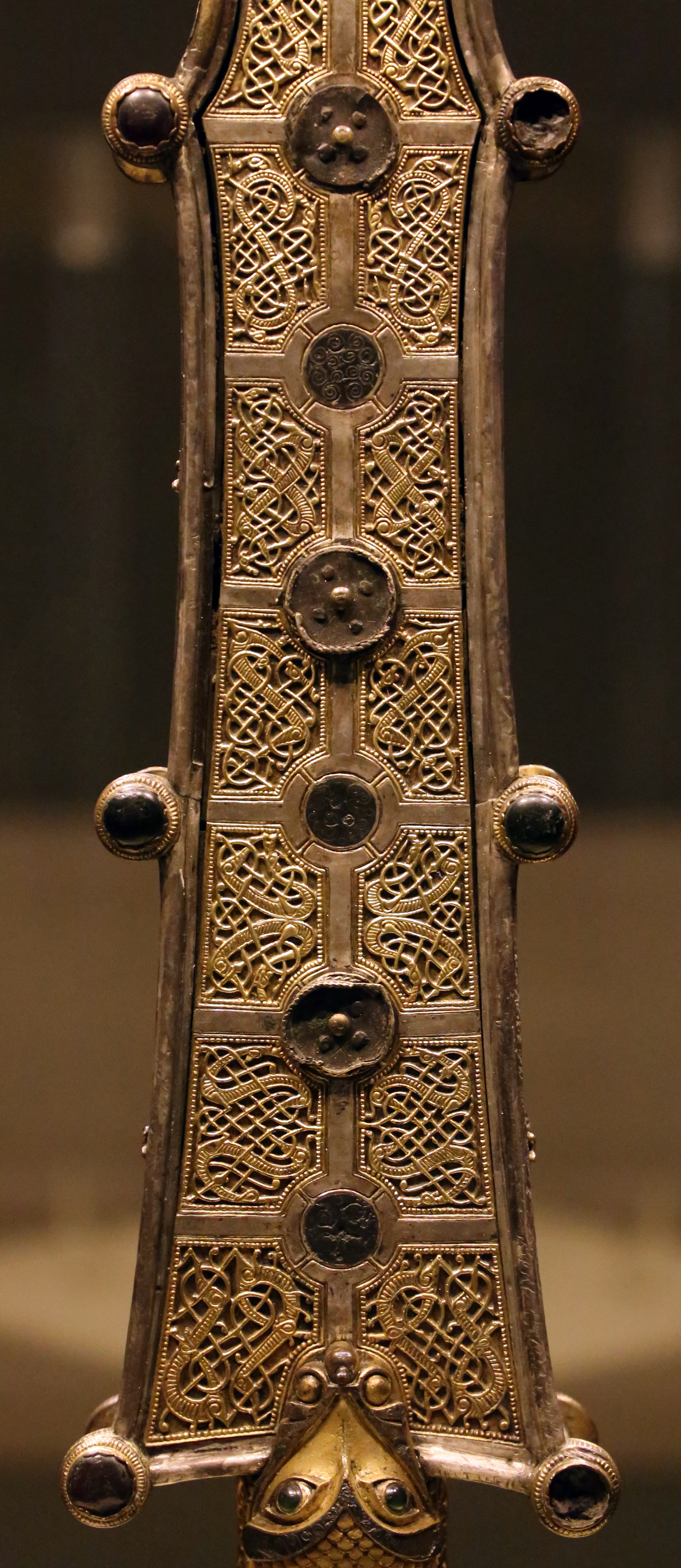
Upper panels

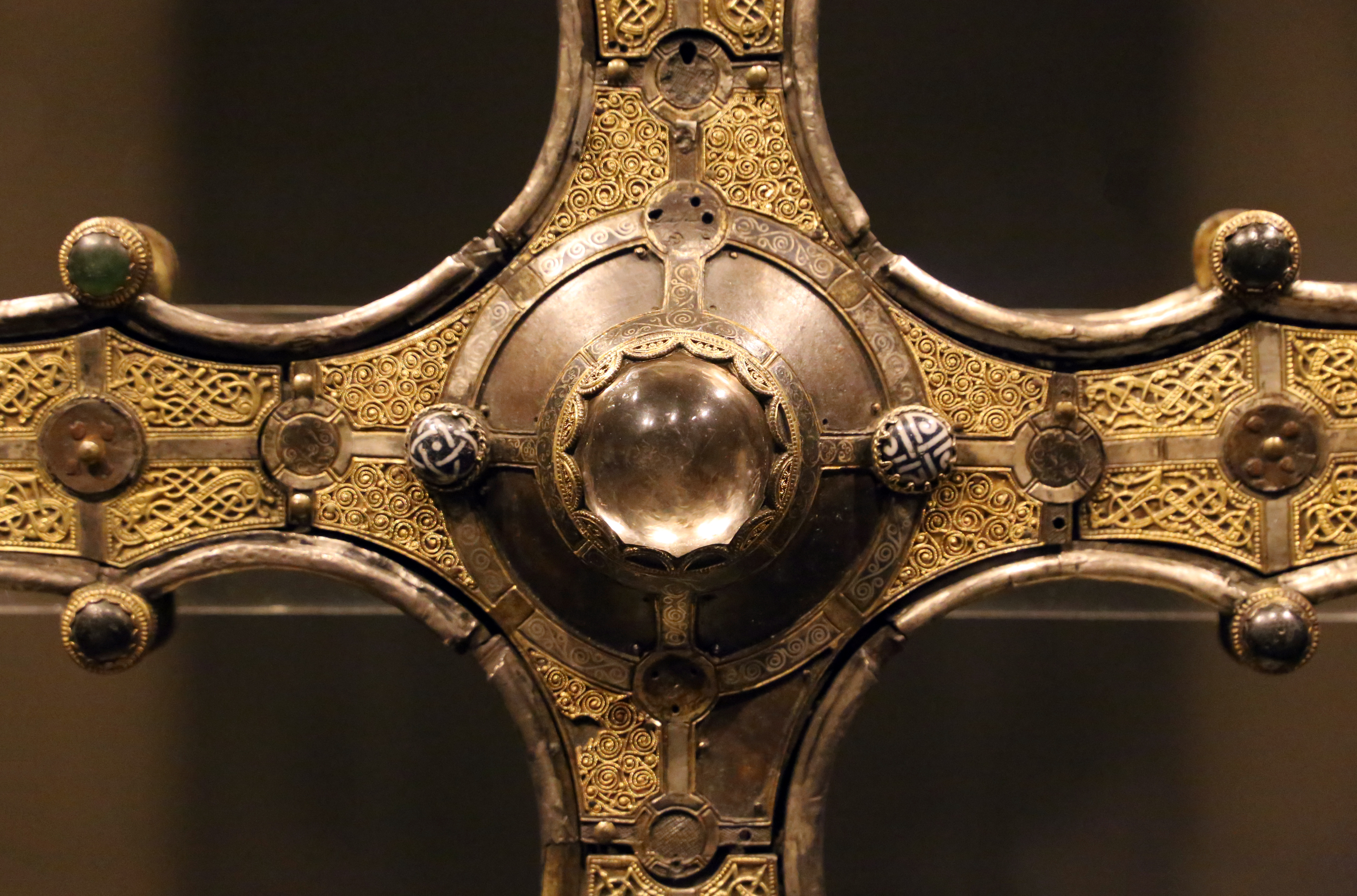
Central rock crystal

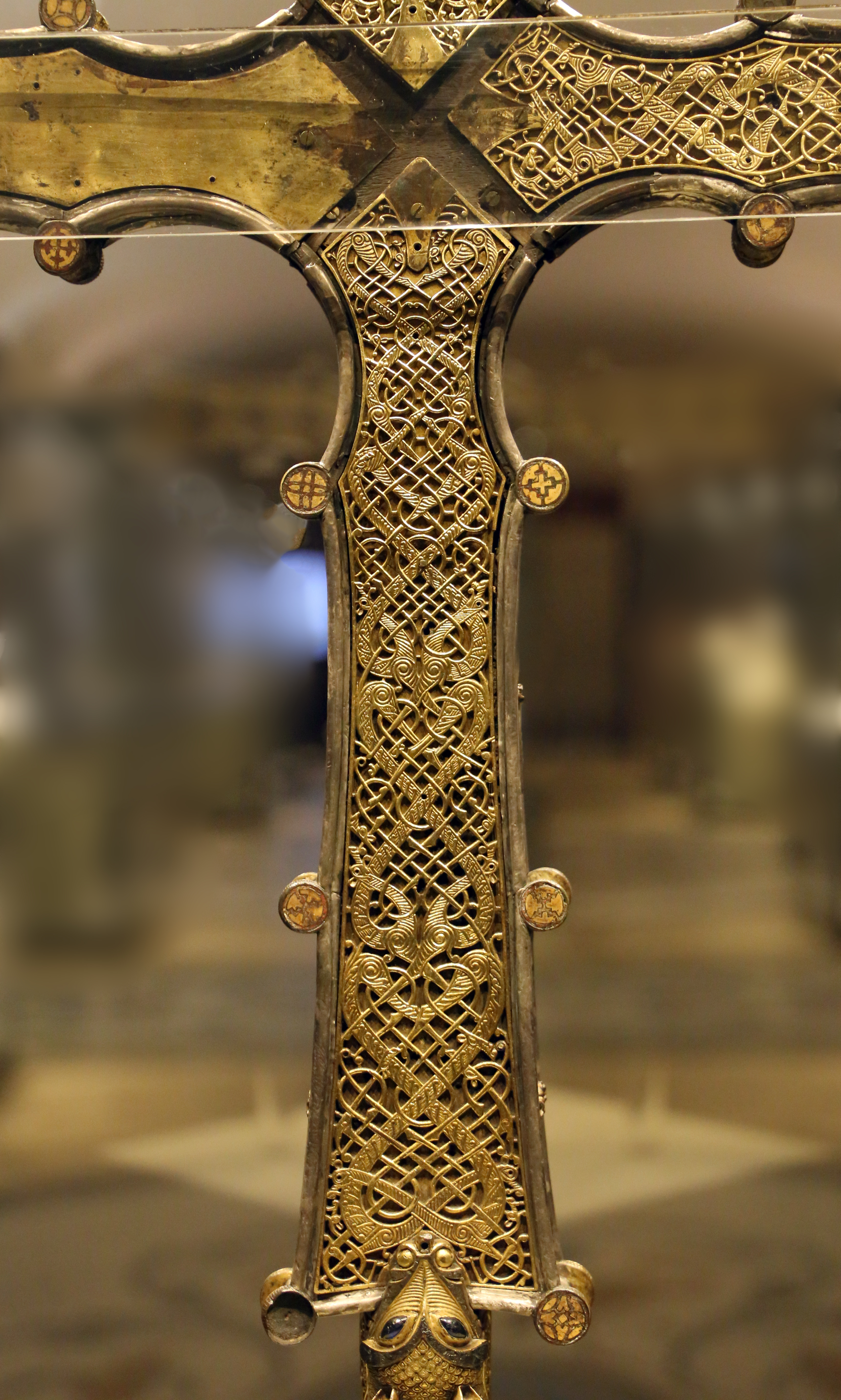
Detail of the reverse

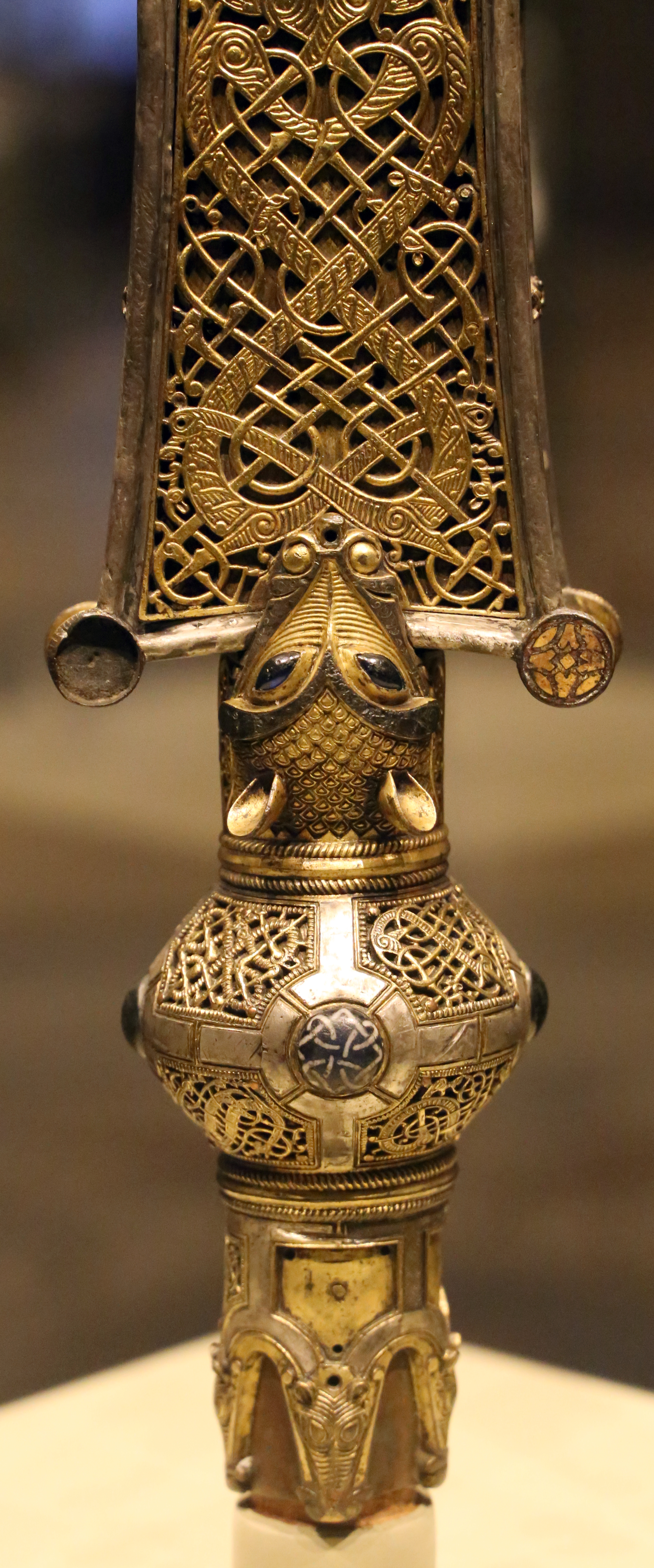
Knope at base of the cross

== Inscriptions ==
The cross has inscriptions on it, – all of which are in the Irish language, with the exception of one which is in Latin.

The translated Irish language inscriptions read as follows: "A prayer for Tairrdelbach Ua Conchobair, for the King of Ireland, for whom this shrine was made. Pray for Muireadhach Ua Dubhthaigh, the Senior of Erin. Pray for Domnall mac Flannacáin Ua Dubthaig, Bishop of Connacht and Comarb [Successor] of [Saints] Comman and Ciaran, under whose superintendence the shrine was made. Pray for Mael Isu mac Bratdan O Echan, who made this shrine".

The Latin inscription occurs twice – once on each side of the shaft – in one case the letters of the sixth word are PAHUS, and in the other, PASUS; it should read PASSUS. A facsimile engraving (taken from a rubbing) of one of these inscriptions is shown to the right. In standard Latin this is rendered as "Hāc cruce crux tegitur quā pas[s]us conditor orbis", which has been translated as "With this cross is covered the cross on which suffered the Maker of the World." or, with similar meaning, as "In this cross is preserved [or conserved] the cross on which the Founder of the world suffered." The inscription forms a line of dactylic hexameter.

== Creation and dating ==
The technical and stylistic similarities to the "Cross of Cong group", (Note: The 'Cross of Cong', 'the Aghadoe crosier', ' shrine of the Book of Dimma' and the 'Shrine of Manchan' are grouped as originating at the same Roscommon workshop. The Smalls Sword (c. 1100), recently discovered in Wales, has similar Urnes ornamentation.) confirms without doubt the Cross of Cong was crafted in twelfth century county Roscommon. The cross was likely commissioned by Bishop "Domnall mac Flannacain Ui Dubthaig", of Elphin, one of the richest episcopal see's in Medieval Ireland, and created by the master gold-craftsman named Irish: Mael Isu Bratain Ui Echach ("Mailisa MacEgan"), whom O'Donovan says was Abbot of Cloncraff, in county Roscommon, though firm evidence for this identification is lacking.

The founder and patron Saint of this workshop might have been St. Assicus of Elphin.

== Origin and provenance ==
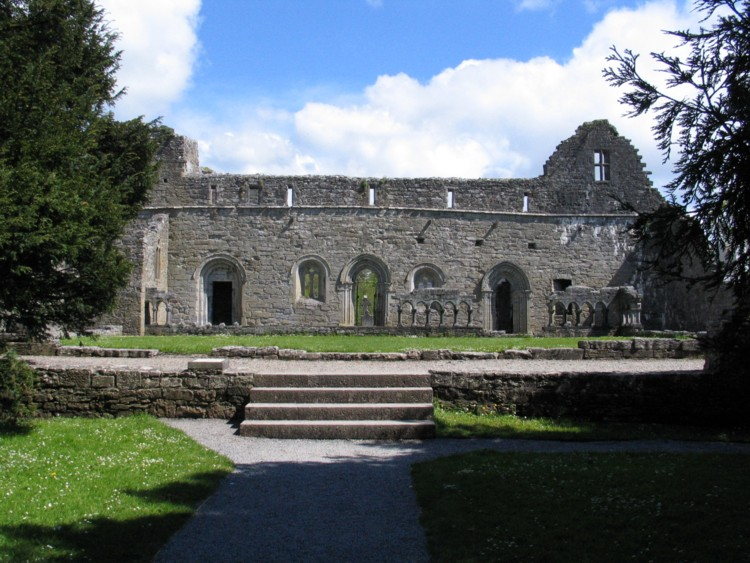
Ruins of Cong Abbey, County Mayo

According to Irish annals, supported by the inscriptions on the cross itself (which refer to known historical personages), the cross was made in County Roscommon. In the annals, the cross is sometimes called in the Irish language "an Bacall Buidhe", which translates as "the yellow staff" – a reference to its golden colour. The inscription on the side of the cross states that it was commissioned by King Tairrdelbach Ua Conchobair (King of Connacht) and made by the craftsman Mael Isu. According to the Irish annals, a small piece of the purported True Cross arrived in Ireland in 1123 and was enshrined at Roscommon. (Note: The Annals of Tigernach note the arrival of "Christ's Cross", from which Toirdhealbhach Ó Conchobhair requested a piece. Historians, however, almost universally dismiss such claims that pieces of the True Cross were ever found. Most Medieval relics are considered not to be genuine, though many Medieval chroniclers doubtless considered them to be so.) The cross then appears to have moved to Tuam. At an early date, probably in the mid-12th century, the cross was moved from Tuam to Cong Abbey, an abbey founded by the Augustinians on a much earlier Christian site. In later centuries, the exact location of the cross in the Cong area is uncertain but it appears to have been hidden by locals and ecclesiastics in their homes because of religious persecution against Catholics, which reached its peak in Ireland under the penal laws.

In 1680, Ruaidhrí Ó Flaithbheartaigh, the historian from County Galway, saw the cross (which he referred to as the "Abbot of Cong's Cross") and copied inscriptions from it. Edward Lhuyd of Wales, (Note: (Petrie 1850) mistakenly calls him Humphrey Lloyd and incorrectly gives the publication date as 1709. Petrie stated that he thought that the cross must have been seen by Lloyd (meaning Lhuyd) on a tour he made of Connacht at the beginning of the 18th century. However, it appears that it was Ruaidhrí Ó Flaithbheartaigh who supplied Lhuyd with the details for his book by sending him copies of his own notes that he had made in 1680.) Ó Flaithbheartaigh's friend, recorded this fact in his "Archaeologia Britannica", published in 1707.

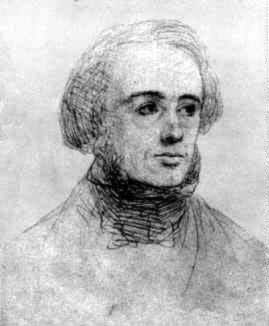
James MacCullagh (1809–1847).

In the 19th century, George Petrie, the Irish antiquarian, was aware that Lhuyd's book mentioned the cross, though he partly misinterpreted the details. In 1822, Petrie had seen the cross himself when he passed through Cong on a tour he made of Connacht. Petrie told his friend, Professor James MacCullagh (of Trinity College Dublin), about the cross and of its historical value. MacCullagh, using his own money, though not a rich man, afterwards purchased the cross from the Parish Priest of Cong – Fr. Michael Waldron. (Note: He paid 100 guineas for it.) Fr. Waldron had succeeded Fr. Patrick Prendergast as Parish Priest of Cong, when Fr. Prendergast died in 1829, and discovered the cross amongst his belongings. Fr. Patrick Prendergast, an Augustinian, was also considered to be the last Abbot of Cong Abbey. Fr. Prendergast had discovered the cross hidden in an old oak chest kept in a house in the village, where it was said to have been kept since about the mid-17th century (the time of the Cromwellian conquest of Ireland). Fr. Prendergast then kept the cross in his house, named 'Abbotstown', located on a farm in the townland of Ballymagibbon (or Ballymacgibbon), which is close to Cong. William Wilde, who was from this part of Ireland, had seen the cross in his childhood in Fr. Prendergast's possession and stated that at that time (the early 19th century) the cross was used at Cong chapel at the festivals of Christmas and Easter, when it was placed on the altar during mass. MacCullagh presented the cross in 1839 to the Royal Irish Academy, where it was for a long period one of its most treasured artefacts.

About 1890, the cross was transferred to the newly opened National Museum of Science and Art, Dublin, which was the predecessor of the National Museum of Ireland, and remained in the same building when the National Museum of Ireland was founded in 1925. Today, the cross remains in the National Museum of Ireland, although it was on display in the National Museum of Ireland – Country Life, Turlough Park, Castlebar, from 31 March 2010 for one year, while the Dublin museum was being renovated. This was the first time the cross had left Dublin since the 1830s.
