= Patrick Prendergast (abbot) =

Irish Catholic abbot

Father Patrick Prendergast (c. 1741–1829) was the last Roman Catholic Abbot of Cong and guardian of the Cross of Cong.

Prendergast may have been a seminarian at St Omer, which was suppressed in 1791. A Patricius Prendergast of the diocese of Tuam is noted as having graduated Bachelor in utroque jure from Paris in June 1783.

Prendergast was appointed parish priest of Cong in 1795, and was the last titular abbot of the Augustinian Abbey, holding that position until his death (the decision being made to not appoint a successor). Sir William Wilde described him as "a very fine, courteous, white-haired old man".

Prendergast not only re-discovered the Cross of Cong, he appears to have been responsible for the return to Ireland of the Cathach of St. Columba from Belgium in the early 19th century.

Prendergast died in 1829 and was succeeded by Fr. Patrick Waldron.
