= Conchobar Ua Conchobair =

Irish noble

Conchobar Ua Conchobair (Anglicised as Conor O'Conor), served as tánaiste of Connacht, fl. 1126–1144.

== Background ==
Conchobar was one of over twenty sons sired by Tairrdelbach Ua Conchobair, and his first chosen heir.

== King of Dublin ==
1126. An army was led by Toirdhealbhach Ua Conchobhair, and he gave the kingdom of Ath-cliath and Leinster to his own son, Conchobhar; he afterwards proceeded to the South, and defeated Cormac Mac Carthaigh, and burned his camp at Sliabh-an-Caithligh.

== King of Mide ==
Following Tairrdelbach's kidnapping of the king of Mide in 1143, "the kingdom of Meath was given by Toirdhealbhach to his own son, Conchobhar." However, the strategy backfired as the annals for 1144 record:

Conchobhar, son of Toirdhealbhach Ua Conchobhair, heir apparent to the monarchy of Ireland, was killed at Bealach Muine-na-Siride, by Ua Dubhlaich, lord of Feara-Tulach, for he considered him as a stranger in sovereignty over the men of Meath. Toirdhealbhach Ua Conchobhair gave West Meath to Donnchadh, son of Muircheartach Ua Maeleachlainn; and he divided East Meath equally between Tighearnan Ua Ruairc, lord of Breifne, and Diarmaid Mac Murchadha, King of Leinster, and they remained thus under the protection of the Connaughtmen.

Later that year, "four hundred cows were given by the men of Meath to Toirdhealbhach Ua Conchobhair, as eric for his son, Conchobhar."

Conchobar's death resulted in the released of his half-brother, Ruaidhri, who would eventually insinuate himself as his father's Tánaiste.

== Children and descendants ==
Brian Mainech, son of Conchobhar, son of Toirrdhelbach was killed at the battle of Ath na caisberna in 1159, a significant defeat of Connacht by Aileach. He appears to be the only child of Conchobar recorded in either the annals or genealogies. If Conchobair had any further issue, they are unknown.
